= Six Days of Ghent =

Cycling race

Coordinates: 51.03874°N 3.72102°E

Race details
- Date: November
- Region: Ghent, Belgium
- Local name: Zesdaagse Vlaanderen-Gent (in Dutch)
- Discipline: Track
- Type: Six-day racing
- Web site: lottozesdaagse.be/nl/

History
- First edition: 1922
- Editions: 84 (as of 2025)
- First winner: Marcel Buysse (BEL); Oscar Egg (SUI)
- Most recent: Benjamin Thomas (FRA); Fabio Van den Bossche (BEL)

The Six Days of Ghent (Dutch: Zesdaagse Vlaanderen-Gent) is a six-day track cycling race held annually in Ghent, Belgium.

It takes place in the Kuipke velodrome in Ghent's Citadelpark.

The 66th running of this event from 21 to 26 November 2006 was marred by the death of one of the riders. During the fifth day's racing, Isaac Gálvez of Spain rode into the barrier edging the outside of the track and died on his way to hospital.

The event includes the Memorial Patrick Sercu madison, named after the former race director at Ghent and holder of the world record for number of six-day victories, Patrick Sercu, who died in 2019.

The 69th running took place from 24 to 29 November 2009. A Danish team formed by Alex Rasmussen and his companion Michael Mørkøv won with a 3-point difference. The previous year's winner, Iljo Keisse, ended second.

The 70th running was held from 23 to 28 November 2010.

The track used for the event, the Kuipke, is measured at 166.66 m, with steep side banks surrounding the track.

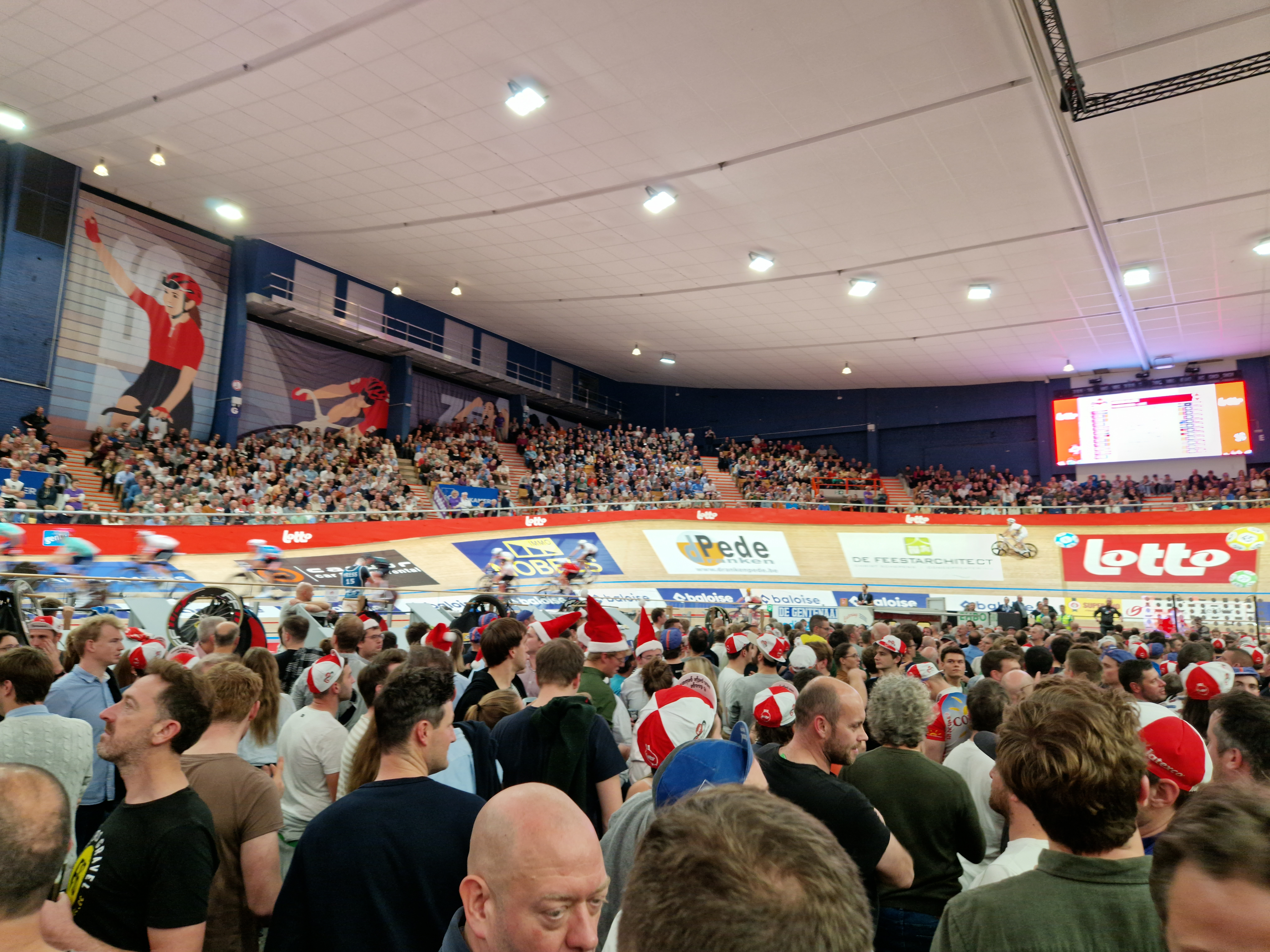
2023 Six Days of Ghent

== List of winning teams ==
Year	Winners	Second	Third
1922	(Belgium) Marcel Buysse (Switzerland) Oscar Egg	(Belgium) Lucien Buysse (Belgium) Henri Van Lerberghe	(Belgium) Henri Wynsdau (Belgium) Théodore Wynsdau
1923	(Belgium) Lucien Buysse (Belgium) Victor Standaert	(Belgium) Henri Frederickx (Belgium) John Van Ruysseveldt	(France) André Narcy (France) Camille Narcy
1924	(Belgium) Aloïs Persijn (Belgium) Jules Verschelden	(Belgium) Lucien Buysse (Belgium) Jules Van Hevel	(Belgium) Kamiel De Clercq (Belgium) Julien Delbecque
1925	(Belgium) César Debaets (Belgium) Jules Van Hevel	(Belgium) Aloïs Persijn (Belgium) Jules Verschelden	(Belgium) Lucien Buysse (Belgium) Emile Thollembeek
1926	(Belgium) César Debaets (Belgium) Emile Thollembeek	(Belgium) Victor Standaert (Belgium) René Vermandel	(Belgium) Louis Maes (Belgium) Isidoor Méchant
1927	(Belgium) Maurice Dewolf (Belgium) Hilaire Hellebaut	(Belgium) Oscar Daemers (Belgium) Albert Maes	(Belgium) Raphaël Fonteyne (Belgium) Karel Clapdorp
1928-1935	No race		
1936	(Belgium) Albert Billiet (Belgium) Camile Dekuysscher	(Netherlands) Kees Pellenaars (Netherlands) Frans Slaats	(Germany) Gustav Kilian (Germany) Heinz Vöpel
1937	No race		
1938	(Netherlands) Kees Pellenaars (Netherlands) Frans Slaats	(Belgium) Albert Billiet (Belgium) Albert Buysse	(Netherlands) Frans van den Broek (Netherlands) Louis van Schijndel
1939-1946	No race due to World War II		
1947	(Netherlands) Gerrit Boeijen (Netherlands) Gerrit Schulte	(Belgium) Robert Naeye (Belgium) Rik Van Steenbergen	(Belgium) Camile Dekuysscher (Belgium) Albert Sercu
1948	(Belgium) Achiel Bruneel (Belgium) Camile Dekuysscher	(Belgium) René Adriaenssens (Belgium) Albert Bruylandt	(Belgium) Albert Sercu (Belgium) Fernand Spelte
1949	(Netherlands) Gerrit Boeijen (Netherlands) Gerrit Schulte	(Belgium) Marcel Kint (Belgium) Rik Van Steenbergen	(Australia) Reginald Arnold (Australia) Alfred Strom
1950	(Netherlands) Gerrit Peters (Netherlands) Gerrit Schulte	(Belgium) Robert Naeye (Belgium) Rik Van Steenbergen	(Belgium) Achiel Bruneel (Belgium) Albert Bruylandt
1951	(Belgium) René Adriaenssens (Belgium) Albert Bruylandt	(Belgium) Achiel Bruneel (Belgium) Rik Van Steenbergen	(Australia) Reginald Arnold (Australia) Alfred Strom
1952	(Switzerland) Walter Bucher (Switzerland) Armin Von Bueren	(Belgium) Gérard Buyl (Belgium) Valère Ollivier	(Belgium) Arthur Mommerency (Belgium) Henri Tytgat
1953	(Belgium) Achiel Bruneel (Belgium) Arsène Rijckaert	(Australia) Reginald Arnold (Australia) Alfred Strom	(Netherlands) Gerrit Peters (Netherlands) Gerrit Schulte
1954	(Belgium) Stan Ockers (Belgium) Rik Van Steenbergen	(Belgium) Lucien Acou (Belgium) Achiel Bruneel	(Luxembourg) Lucien Gillen (Italy) Ferdinando Terruzzi
1955 (1)	(Luxembourg) Lucien Gillen (Italy) Ferdinando Terruzzi	(France) Dominique Forlini (France) Georges Senfftleben	(Belgium) Stan Ockers (Belgium) Rik Van Steenbergen
1955 (2)	(Belgium) Emile Severeyns (Belgium) Rik Van Steenbergen	(Belgium) Stan Ockers (Italy) Ferdinando Terruzzi	(Australia) Reginald Arnold (Belgium) Fred De Bruyne
1956	(Australia) Reginald Arnold (Italy) Ferdinando Terruzzi	(Belgium) Emile Severeyns (Belgium) Rik Van Steenbergen	(Switzerland) Walter Bucher (Switzerland) Jean Roth
1957	(Belgium) Fred De Bruyne (Belgium) Rik Van Steenbergen	(Australia) Reginald Arnold (Italy) Ferdinando Terruzzi	(Netherlands) Gerrit Schulte (Belgium) Willy Vannitsen
1958	(Australia) Reginald Arnold (Belgium) Rik Van Looy	(Belgium) Emile Severeyns (Belgium) Rik Van Steenbergen	(Netherlands) Gerrit Schulte (Italy) Ferdinando Terruzzi
1959	(Belgium) Fred De Bruyne (Belgium) Rik Van Steenbergen	(France) André Darrigade (Netherlands) Gerrit Schulte	(Australia) Reginald Arnold (Belgium) Michel Van Aerde
1960	(Netherlands) Peter Post (Belgium) Rik Van Looy	(Belgium) Emile Severeyns (Belgium) Rik Van Steenbergen	(Australia) Reginald Arnold (Belgium) José Denoyette
1961	(Netherlands) Peter Post (Belgium) Rik Van Looy	(Belgium) Emile Severeyns (Belgium) Rik Van Steenbergen	(West Germany) Klaus Bugdahl (Belgium) Arthur De Cabooter
1962-1964	No editions due to the destruction of the Sportpaleis Gent by a fire and the construction of 't Kuipke		
1965	(Belgium) Eddy Merckx (Belgium) Patrick Sercu	(Netherlands) Peter Post (United Kingdom) Tom Simpson	(Belgium) Emile Severeyns (Belgium) Rik Van Steenbergen
1966	(Switzerland) Fritz Pfenninger (Netherlands) Peter Post	(West Germany) Klaus Bugdahl (Belgium) Patrick Sercu	(West Germany) Rudi Altig (West Germany) Sigi Renz
1967	(Belgium) Eddy Merckx (Belgium) Patrick Sercu	(Denmark) Freddy Eugen (Denmark) Palle Lykke Jensen	(Switzerland) Fritz Pfenninger (Netherlands) Peter Post
1968	(Netherlands) Leo Duyndam (Netherlands) Peter Post	(Belgium) Patrick Sercu (Belgium) Rik Van Looy	(Switzerland) Fritz Pfenninger (Switzerland) Louis Pfenninger
1969	(West Germany) Rudi Altig (West Germany) Sigi Renz	(Belgium) Patrick Sercu (France) Alain Van Lancker	(Netherlands) Peter Post (Belgium) Norbert Seeuws
1970	(Belgium) Jean-Pierre Monseré (Belgium) Patrick Sercu	(Belgium) Roger De Vlaeminck (Netherlands) Peter Post	(Australia) Graeme Gilmore (Belgium) Julien Stevens
1971	(Belgium) Roger De Vlaeminck (Belgium) Patrick Sercu	(Belgium) Ferdinand Bracke (Netherlands) Peter Post	(Belgium) Julien Stevens (Belgium) Théo Verschueren
1972	(Belgium) Patrick Sercu (Belgium) Julien Stevens	(Belgium) Norbert Seeuws (France) Alain Van Lancker	(Australia) Graeme Gilmore (Belgium) Walter Godefroot
1973	(Australia) Graeme Gilmore (Belgium) Patrick Sercu	(Netherlands) Leo Duyndam (Netherlands) René Pijnen	(Netherlands) Cees Stam (Belgium) Théo Verschueren
1974	(Australia) Graeme Gilmore (Belgium) Julien Stevens	(West Germany) Sigi Renz (Belgium) Patrick Sercu	(Netherlands) René Pijnen (Netherlands) Roy Schuiten
1975	(Belgium) Eddy Merckx (Belgium) Patrick Sercu	(Australia) Graeme Gilmore (Belgium) Julien Stevens	(West Germany) Klaus Bugdahl (France) Alain Van Lancker
1976	(Australia) Donald Allan (Australia) Danny Clark	(Belgium) Patrick Sercu (Belgium) Ferdi Van Den Haute	(Australia) Graeme Gilmore (Belgium) Julien Stevens
1977	(Belgium) Eddy Merckx (Belgium) Patrick Sercu	(Australia) Danny Clark (Belgium) Freddy Maertens	(West Germany) Albert Fritz (West Germany) Wilfried Peffgen
1978	(Netherlands) Gerrie Knetemann (Belgium) Patrick Sercu	(Australia) Danny Clark (Belgium) Ferdi Van Den Haute	(Liechtenstein) Roman Hermann (Belgium) Stan Tourné
1979	(Australia) Donald Allan (Australia) Danny Clark	(Belgium) Patrick Sercu (Belgium) Stan Tourné	(Netherlands) René Pijnen (Belgium) Michel Vaarten
1980	(West Germany) Albert Fritz (Belgium) Patrick Sercu	(Australia) Donald Allan (Australia) Danny Clark	(Belgium) Willy Debosscher (Netherlands) René Pijnen
1981	(Denmark) Gert Frank (Belgium) Patrick Sercu	(Australia) Danny Clark (Belgium) Etienne De Wilde	(Belgium) Willy Debosscher (Netherlands) René Pijnen
1982	(Australia) Donald Allan (Australia) Danny Clark	(Switzerland) Robert Dill-Bundi (Switzerland) Urs Freuler	(Belgium) Roger De Vlaeminck (Belgium) Patrick Sercu
1983	(Belgium) Etienne De Wilde (Netherlands) René Pijnen	(West Germany) Albert Fritz (West Germany) Dietrich Thurau	(Belgium) Romain Costermans (Belgium) Michel Vaarten
1984	(Denmark) Gert Frank (Denmark) Hans-Henrik Ørsted	(Belgium) Etienne De Wilde (Belgium) Stan Tourné	(Australia) Danny Clark (United Kingdom) Anthony Doyle
1985	(Belgium) Etienne De Wilde (Belgium) Stan Tourné	(United Kingdom) Anthony Doyle (Belgium) Michel Vaarten	(Belgium) Rudy Dhaenens (Liechtenstein) Roman Hermann
1986	(Australia) Danny Clark (United Kingdom) Anthony Doyle	(Belgium) Etienne De Wilde (Belgium) Stan Tourné	(Denmark) Gert Frank (Belgium) Michel Vaarten
1987	(Australia) Danny Clark (Belgium) Etienne De Wilde	(Liechtenstein) Roman Hermann (Belgium) Stan Tourné	(Italy) Pierangelo Bincoletto (Denmark) Hans-Henrik Ørsted
1988	(Switzerland) Urs Freuler (Liechtenstein) Roman Hermann	(Belgium) Etienne De Wilde (Belgium) Stan Tourné	(Australia) Danny Clark (United Kingdom) Anthony Doyle
1989	(Belgium) Etienne De Wilde (Belgium) Stan Tourné	(Australia) Danny Clark (Soviet Union) Konstantin Khrabtsov	(Switzerland) Urs Freuler (Switzerland) Hans-Rüdi Märki
1990	Danny Clark (AUS); Roland Günther (FRG)	Marat Ganeev (URS); Konstantin Khrabtsov (URS)	Urs Freuler (SUI); Hansruedi Märki (SUI)
1991	Etienne De Wilde (BEL); Tony Doyle (GBR)	Urs Freuler (SUI); Peter Pieters (NED)	Roland Günther (GER); Rik Van Slycke (BEL)
1992	Etienne De Wilde (BEL); Jens Veggerby (DEN)	Urs Freuler (SUI); Peter Pieters (NED)	Bruno Risi (SUI); Rik Van Slycke (BEL)
1993	Kurt Betschart (SUI); Bruno Risi (SUI)	Urs Freuler (SUI); Werner Stutz (SUI)	Johan Bruyneel (BEL); Etienne De Wilde (BEL)
1994	Danny Clark (AUS); Etienne De Wilde (BEL)	Urs Freuler (SUI); Carsten Wolf (GER)	Jimmi Madsen (DEN); Peter Van Petegem (BEL)
1995	Etienne De Wilde (BEL); Andreas Kappes (GER)	Jimmi Madsen (DEN); Jens Veggerby (DEN)	Silvio Martinello (ITA); Marco Villa (ITA)
1996	Kurt Betschart (SUI); Bruno Risi (SUI)	Adriano Baffi (ITA); Etienne De Wilde (BEL)	Andreas Kappes (GER); Carsten Wolf (GER)
1997	Etienne De Wilde (BEL); Matthew Gilmore (AUS)	Jimmi Madsen (DEN); Jens Veggerby (DEN)	Silvio Martinello (ITA); Marco Villa (ITA)
1998	Silvio Martinello (ITA); Marco Villa (ITA)	Etienne De Wilde (BEL); Andreas Kappes (GER)	Tayeb Braikia (DEN); Jimmi Madsen (DEN)
1999	Jimmi Madsen (DEN); Scott McGrory (AUS)	Adriano Baffi (ITA); Silvio Martinello (ITA)	Etienne De Wilde (BEL); Matthew Gilmore (BEL)
2000	Matthew Gilmore (BEL); Silvio Martinello (ITA)	Brett Aitken (AUS); Scott McGrory (AUS)	Adriano Baffi (ITA); Frank Corvers (BEL)
2001	Matthew Gilmore (BEL); Scott McGrory (AUS)	Kurt Betschart (SUI); Bruno Risi (SUI)	Etienne De Wilde (BEL); Andreas Kappes (GER)
2002	Kurt Betschart (SUI); Bruno Risi (SUI)	Matthew Gilmore (BEL); Bradley Wiggins (GBR)	Jimmi Madsen (DEN); Marty Nothstein (USA)
2003	Matthew Gilmore (BEL); Bradley Wiggins (GBR)	Robert Slippens (NED); Danny Stam (NED)	Kurt Betschart (SUI); Bruno Risi (SUI)
2004	Robert Slippens (NED); Danny Stam (NED)	Andreas Beikirch (GER); Iljo Keisse (BEL)	Gerd Dörich (GER); Andreas Kappes (GER)
2005	Matthew Gilmore (BEL); Iljo Keisse (BEL)	Robert Slippens (NED); Danny Stam (NED)	Andreas Beikirch (BEL); Kurt Betschart (SUI)
2006	No winners Note: Robert Bartko and Iljo Keisse were leading when Isaac Gálvez crashed and died during the fifth day. Due to his death, the race was abandoned and no winners declared.		
2007	Robert Bartko (GER); Iljo Keisse (BEL)	Franco Marvulli (SUI); Bruno Risi (SUI)	Robert Slippens (NED); Danny Stam (NED)
2008	Robert Bartko (GER); Iljo Keisse (BEL)	Leif Lampater (GER); Erik Zabel (GER)	Andreas Beikirch (GER); Kenny De Ketele (BEL)
2009	Michael Mørkøv (DEN); Alex Rasmussen (DEN)	Iljo Keisse (BEL); Roger Kluge (GER)	Franco Marvulli (SUI); Bruno Risi (SUI)
2010	Iljo Keisse (BEL); Peter Schep (NED)	Kenny De Ketele (BEL); Leif Lampater (GER)	Michael Mørkøv (DEN); Alex Rasmussen (DEN)
2011	Robert Bartko (GER); Kenny De Ketele (BEL)	Peter Schep (NED); Wim Stroetinga (NED)	Marc Hester (DEN); Morgan Kneisky (FRA)
2012	Iljo Keisse (BEL); Glenn O'Shea (AUS)	Kenny De Ketele (BEL); Gijs Van Hoecke (BEL)	Robert Bartko (GER); Silvan Dillier (SUI)
2013	Jasper De Buyst (BEL); Leif Lampater (GER)	Iljo Keisse (BEL); Wim Stroetinga (NED)	Kenny De Ketele (BEL); Gijs Van Hoecke (BEL)
2014	Jasper De Buyst (BEL); Kenny De Ketele (BEL)	Mark Cavendish (GBR); Iljo Keisse (BEL)	Silvan Dillier (SUI); Leif Lampater (GER)
2015	Iljo Keisse (BEL); Michael Mørkøv (DEN)	Kenny De Ketele (BEL); Gijs Van Hoecke (BEL)	Jasper De Buyst (BEL); Otto Vergaerde (BEL)
2016	Mark Cavendish (GBR); Bradley Wiggins (GBR)	Kenny De Ketele (BEL); Moreno De Pauw (BEL)	Iljo Keisse (BEL); Elia Viviani (ITA)
2017	Kenny De Ketele (BEL); Moreno De Pauw (BEL)	Morgan Kneisky (FRA); Benjamin Thomas (FRA)	Yoeri Havik (NED); Wim Stroetinga (NED)
2018	Iljo Keisse (BEL); Elia Viviani (ITA)	Kenny De Ketele (BEL); Robbe Ghys (BEL)	Jasper De Buyst (BEL); Tosh Van der Sande (BEL)
2019	Kenny De Ketele (BEL); Robbe Ghys (BEL)	Jasper De Buyst (BEL); Tosh Van der Sande (BEL)	Roger Kluge (GER); Theo Reinhardt (GER)
2020	No race due to COVID-19 pandemic in Belgium		
2021	Kenny De Ketele (BEL); Robbe Ghys (BEL)	Jasper De Buyst (BEL); Roger Kluge (GER)	Lasse Norman Hansen (DEN); Michael Mørkøv (DEN)
2022	Lindsay De Vylder (BEL); Robbe Ghys (BEL)	Yoeri Havik (NED); Fabio Van Den Bossche (BEL)	Jasper De Buyst (BEL); Iljo Keisse (BEL)
2023	Lindsay De Vylder (BEL); Robbe Ghys (BEL)	Yoeri Havik (NED); Jan-Willem van Schip (NED)	Fabio Van Den Bossche (BEL); Jules Hesters (BEL)
2024	Benjamin Thomas (FRA); Fabio Van Den Bossche (BEL)	Lindsay De Vylder (BEL); Robbe Ghys (BEL)	Aaron Gate (NZL); Jules Hesters (BEL)
2025	Fabio Van Den Bossche (BEL); Lindsay De Vylder (BEL)	Yoeri Havik (NED); Jules Hesters (BEL)	Jasper De Buyst (BEL); Elia Viviani (ITA)

== See also ==
- Six Days of Brussels
- Six Days of Amsterdam
- Six Days of Grenoble
- Six Days of New York
