= Six Days of Münster =

1950–1981 Münster cycling race

- 1973 Six Days of Münster race

Race details
- Region: Münster, Germany
- Local name(s): Sechstagerennen von Münster (in German)
- Discipline: Track
- Type: Six-day racing

History
- First edition: 1950
- Editions: 34
- Final edition: 1988
- First winner: Gustav Kilian (LUX); Jean Roth (SUI)
- Most wins: Jean Roth (SUI) (5)
- Final winner: Anthony Doyle (GBR); Danny Clark (AUS)

The Six Days of Münster was a six-day track cycling race held annually in Münster, Germany from 1950 to 1988. Gustav Kilian, who had become renowned for his successes at other six-day races, entered as favourite and ended up winning the 1950 race.

In 1987 and 1988, the organizers tried unsuccessfully to relaunch the Six Days.

Jean Roth won in five editions.

== Winners ==
Year	Winner	Second	Third
1950	(Luxembourg) Gustav Kilian (Switzerland) Jean Roth	(Netherlands) Cor Bakker (Netherlands) Henk Lakeman	(Germany) Ludwig Hörmann (Germany) Jean Schorn
1951 (1)	(Italy) Ferdinando Terruzzi (Italy) Severino Rigoni	(Germany) Ludwig Hörmann (Germany) Hans Hörmann	(Germany) Rudi Mirke (Switzerland) Jean Roth
1951 (2)	(Italy) Ferdinando Terruzzi (Italy) Severino Rigoni	(France) Émile Carrara (France) Guy Lapebie	(Belgium) Robert Naeye (Belgium) Ernest Thyssen
1952	(Switzerland) Walter Bucher (Switzerland) Jean Roth	(Italy) Ferdinando Terruzzi (Italy) Severino Rigoni	(Australia) Reginald Arnold (Australia) Alfred Strom
1953	(Switzerland) Walter Bucher (Switzerland) Jean Roth	(Germany) Werner Holthöfer (Germany) Hans Preiskeit	(Germany) Waldemar Knocke (Germany) Heinz Zoll
1954	(Germany) Ludwig Hörmann (Germany) Hans Preiskeit	(Luxembourg) Lucien Gillen (Italy) Ferdinando Terruzzi	(Switzerland) Walter Bucher (Switzerland) Jean Roth
1955	(Netherlands) Gerrit Peters (Netherlands) Gerrit Schulte	(Germany) Valentin Petry (Germany) Walter Schurmann	(Switzerland) Walter Bucher (Switzerland) Jean Roth
1956	(Germany) Manfred Donike (Germany) Edi Gieseler	(France) Dominique Forlini (France) Georges Senfftleben	(Germany) Valentin Petry (Germany) Walter Schurmann
1957	(Switzerland) Armin von Büren (Switzerland) Jean Roth	(Germany) Heinz Scholl (Germany) Günther Ziegler	(Germany) Herbert Weinrich (Germany) Heinz Zoll
1958	(Switzerland) Fritz Pfenninger (Switzerland) Jean Roth	(Germany) Valentin Petry (Germany) Klaus Bugdahl	(Denmark) Even Klamer (Denmark) Knud Lynge
1959	(Luxembourg) Lucien Gillen (Netherlands) Peter Post	(Germany) Hans Junkermann (Italy) Ferdinando Terruzzi	(Switzerland) Fritz Pfenninger (Italy) Mino De Rossi
1960	(Germany) Hans Junkermann (Switzerland) Fritz Pfenninger	(Germany) Manfred Donike (Germany) Rolf Roggendorf	(Switzerland) Walter Bucher (Switzerland) Oskar Plattner
1961	no edition		
1962	(Germany) Rudi Altig (Germany) Hans Junkermann	(Belgium) Emile Severeyns (Belgium) Rik Van Steenbergen	(Germany) Klaus Bugdahl (Switzerland) Fritz Pfenninger
1963	(Denmark) Freddy Eugen (Denmark) Palle Lykke	(Netherlands) Peter Post (Switzerland) Fritz Pfenninger	(Germany) Dieter Kemper (Germany) Horst Oldenburg
1964	(Germany) Dieter Kemper (Germany) Horst Oldenburg	(Germany) Klemens Grossimlinghaus (Germany) Rolf Roggendorf	(Denmark) Freddy Eugen (Denmark) Palle Lykke
1965	(Denmark) Freddy Eugen (Denmark) Palle Lykke	(Germany) Klaus Bugdahl (Germany) Klaus May	(Germany) Hans Junkermann (Germany) Horst Oldenburg
1966	(Germany) Dieter Kemper (Germany) Horst Oldenburg	(Germany) Klaus Bugdahl (United Kingdom) Tom Simpson	(Germany) Klemens Grossimlinghaus (Germany) Wilfried Boelke
1967	(Germany) Klaus Bugdahl (Belgium) Patrick Sercu	(Germany) Dieter Kemper (Germany) Horst Oldenburg	(Germany) Hans Junkermann (Germany) Wolfgang Schulze
1968	(Germany) Rudi Altig (Germany) Klaus Bugdahl	(Germany) Dieter Kemper (Germany) Horst Oldenburg	(Denmark) Freddy Eugen (Denmark) Palle Lykke
1969	(Germany) Wolfgang Schulze (Germany) Horst Oldenburg	(Germany) Wilfried Boelke (Germany) Wilfried Peffgen	(Denmark) Freddy Eugen (Germany) Albert Fritz
1970	(France) Alain Van Lancker (Germany) Klaus Bugdahl	(Germany) Rudi Altig (Germany) Albert Fritz	(Germany) Wolfgang Schulze (Germany) Wilfried Peffgen
1971	(Germany) Dieter Kemper (Germany) Klaus Bugdahl	(Germany) Wolfgang Schulze (Germany) Wilfried Peffgen	(France) Alain Van Lancker (Germany) Jürgen Tschan
1972	(Germany) Wilfried Peffgen (Germany) Albert Fritz	(Germany) Wolfgang Schulze (Germany) Jürgen Tschan	(Netherlands) Leo Duyndam (Netherlands) René Pijnen
1973	(Germany) Wilfried Peffgen (Germany) Albert Fritz	(Germany) Dieter Kemper (Germany) Klaus Bugdahl	(Germany) Günther Haritz (Germany) Udo Hempel
1974	(Germany) Wolfgang Schulze (Germany) Jürgen Tschan	(Germany) Dieter Kemper (Germany) Klaus Bugdahl	(Germany) Günther Haritz (Germany) Udo Hempel
1975	(Germany) Günther Haritz (Netherlands) René Pijnen	(Germany) Wolfgang Schulze (Germany) Jürgen Tschan	(Germany) Dieter Kemper (Germany) Udo Hempel
1976	(Germany) Günther Haritz (Netherlands) René Pijnen	(Germany) Wilfried Peffgen (Germany) Albert Fritz	(Germany) Wolfgang Schulze (Germany) Jürgen Tschan
1977	(Australia) Donald Allan (Australia) Danny Clark	(Germany) Günther Haritz (Netherlands) René Pijnen	(Germany) Wilfried Peffgen (Germany) Albert Fritz
1978	(Germany) Wilfried Peffgen (Germany) Albert Fritz	(Liechtenstein) Roman Hermann (Germany) Horst Schütz	(Germany) Günther Schumacher (Germany) Udo Hempel
1979	(Germany) Wilfried Peffgen (Germany) Albert Fritz	(Germany) Günther Schumacher (Germany) Udo Hempel	(Denmark) Gert Frank (Switzerland) René Savary
1980	(Australia) Donald Allan (Australia) Danny Clark	(Liechtenstein) Roman Hermann (Germany) Horst Schütz	(Germany) Wilfried Peffgen (Germany) Albert Fritz
1981	(Denmark) Gert Frank (Netherlands) René Pijnen	(Liechtenstein) Roman Hermann (Germany) Horst Schütz	(Germany) Wilfried Peffgen (Germany) Albert Fritz
1982-1986	no edition		
1987	(Liechtenstein) Roman Hermann (Germany) Josef Kristen	(Germany) Dietrich Thurau (Australia) Danny Clark	(Germany) Dieter Giebken (Netherlands) René Pijnen
1988	(United Kingdom) Anthony Doyle (Australia) Danny Clark	(Germany) Volker Diehl (Germany) Roland Günther	(Liechtenstein) Roman Hermann (Germany) Dietrich Thurau
