= Six Days of Copenhagen =

Cycling race

Race details
- Region: Copenhagen, Denmark
- Discipline: Track
- Type: Six-day racing
- Web site: www.6dageslob.dk

History
- First edition: 1934
- Editions: 57 (as of 2019)

The Six Days of Copenhagen is a six-day track cycling race held annually in Copenhagen, Denmark. The event was first held in 1934. The event is held at the Ballerup Super Arena since it was opened in 2001.

== Winners ==
Year	Winners	Second	Third
1934 (1)	Willy Funda (GER); Hans Pützfeld (GER)	Willy Hansen (DEN); Willy Rieger (GER)	Albert Billiet (BEL); René Martin (BEL)
1934 (2)	Willy Hansen (DEN); Viktor Rausch (GER)	Adolphe Charlier (BEL); Mogens Danholt (DEN)	Willy Funda (GER); Hans Pützfeld (GER)
1935	Not raced		
1936 (1)	Albert Billiet (BEL); Werner Grundahl Hansen (DEN)	Adolphe Charlier (BEL); Roger Deneef (BEL)	Willy Hansen (DEN); Cor Wals (NED)
1936 (2)	Jan Pijnenburg (NED); Frans Slaats (NED)	Albert Billiet (BEL); Kamiel Dekuysscher (BEL)	Werner Grundahl Hansen (DEN); Cor Wals (NED)
1937	Kees Pellenaars (NED); Frans Slaats (NED)	Albert Billiet (BEL); Albert Buysse (BEL)	Louis van Schijndel (NED); Frans van den Broeck (NED)
1938	Not raced		
1939	Karel Kaers (BEL); Omer De Bruycker (BEL)	Werner Grundahl Hansen (DEN); Bjorn Stieler (DEN)	Kees Pellenaars (NED); Frans Slaats (NED)
1940-50	Not raced		
1951	Kay Werner Nielsen (DEN); Oscar Plattner (SUI)	Alvaro Giorgetti (FRA); Ove-Claus Hansen (DEN)	Emile Gosselin (BEL); Evan Klamer (DEN)
1952	Lucien Gillen (LUX); Kay Werner Nielsen (DEN)	Alvaro Giorgetti (FRA); Ib Laursen (DEN)	Marcel Bareth (FRA); Otto Olsen (DEN)
1953	Lucien Gillen (LUX); Ferdinando Terruzzi (ITA)	Evan Klamer (DEN); Kay Werner Nielsen (DEN)	Lucien Acou (BEL); Achiel Bruneel (BEL)
1954	Lucien Gillen (LUX); Ferdinando Terruzzi (ITA)	Evan Klamer (DEN); Kay Werner Nielsen (DEN)	Sid Patterson (AUS); Alfred Strom (AUS)
1955	Evan Klamer (DEN); Kay Werner Nielsen (DEN)	Dominique Forlini (FRA); Georges Senfftleben (FRA)	Lucien Gillen (LUX); Ferdinando Terruzzi (ITA)
1956 (1)	Dominique Forlini (FRA); Georges Senfftleben (FRA)	Gerrit Peters (NED); Gerrit Schulte (NED)	Evan Klamer (DEN); Kay Werner Nielsen (DEN)
1956 (2)	Lucien Gillen (LUX); Gerrit Schulte (NED)	Reginald Arnold (AUS); Ferdinando Terruzzi (ITA)	Evan Klamer (DEN); Kay Werner Nielsen (DEN)
1957	Fritz Pfenninger (SUI); Jean Roth (SUI)	Reginald Arnold (AUS); Ferdinando Terruzzi (ITA)	Lucien Gillen (LUX); Kay Werner Nielsen (DEN)
1958	Emile Severeyns (BEL); Rik Van Steenbergen (BEL)	Palle Lykke Jensen (DEN); Kay Werner Nielsen (DEN)	Fritz Pfenninger (SUI); Jean Roth (SUI)
1959	Palle Lykke Jensen (DEN); Kay Werner Nielsen (DEN)	Emile Severeyns (BEL); Rik Van Steenbergen (BEL)	Reginald Arnold (AUS); Ferdinando Terruzzi (ITA)
1960	Emile Severeyns (BEL); Rik Van Steenbergen (BEL)	Walter Bucher (SUI); Fritz Pfenninger (SUI)	Palle Lykke Jensen (DEN); Kay Werner Nielsen (DEN)
1961-75	Not raced		
1976	Graeme Gilmore (AUS); Dieter Kemper (FRG)	Albert Fritz (FRG); Wilfried Peffgen (FRG)	Günther Haritz (FRG); René Pijnen (NED)
1977	Ole Ritter (DEN); Patrick Sercu (BEL)	Albert Fritz (FRG); Wilfried Peffgen (FRG)	Roman Hermann (LIE); René Pijnen (NED)
1978	Donald Allan (AUS); Danny Clark (AUS)	Wilfried Peffgen (FRG); Ole Ritter (DEN)	Gert Frank (DEN); René Pijnen (NED)
1979	Gert Frank (DEN); René Pijnen (NED)	Donald Allan (AUS); Danny Clark (AUS)	Patrick Sercu (BEL); Kim Gunnar Svendsen (DEN)
1980	Albert Fritz (FRG); Patrick Sercu (BEL)	Kim Gunnar Svendsen (DEN); Danny Clark (AUS)	Roman Hermann (LIE); Horst Schütz (FRG)
1981	Albert Fritz (FRG); Patrick Sercu (BEL)	Gert Frank (DEN); Hans-Henrik Ørsted (DEN)	Roman Hermann (LIE); René Pijnen (NED)
1982	René Pijnen (NED); Patrick Sercu (BEL)	Albert Fritz (FRG); Dietrich Thurau (FRG)	Gert Frank (DEN); Hans-Henrik Ørsted (DEN)
1983	Gert Frank (DEN); Patrick Sercu (BEL)	Danny Clark (AUS); Hans-Henrik Ørsted (DEN)	Albert Fritz (FRG); René Pijnen (NED)
1984	Albert Fritz (FRG); Dietrich Thurau (FRG)	Gert Frank (DEN); Hans-Henrik Ørsted (DEN)	Josef Kristen (FRG); René Pijnen (NED)
1985	Gert Frank (DEN); Hans-Henrik Ørsted (DEN)	Danny Clark (AUS); René Pijnen (NED)	Josef Kristen (FRG); Henry Rinklin (FRG)
1986	Danny Clark (AUS); Tony Doyle (GBR)	Gert Frank (DEN); René Pijnen (NED)	Roman Hermann (LIE); Hans-Henrik Ørsted (DEN)
1987	Danny Clark (AUS); Tony Doyle (GBR)	Roman Hermann (LIE); Josef Kristen (FRG)	Jørgen Vagn Pedersen (DEN); Jesper Worre (DEN)
1988	Roman Hermann (LIE); Hans-Henrik Ørsted (DEN)	Danny Clark (AUS); Tony Doyle (GBR)	Jørgen Vagn Pedersen (DEN); Jesper Worre (DEN)
1989 (1)	Danny Clark (AUS); Urs Freuler (SUI)	Tony Doyle (GBR); Michael Marcussen (DEN)	Dan Frost (DEN); Roman Hermann (LIE)
1989 (2)	Danny Clark (AUS); Jens Veggerby (DEN)	Volker Diehl (GER); Roland Günther (GER)	Sigmund Hermann (LIE); Michael Marcussen (DEN)
1990	Not raced		
1991	Danny Clark (AUS); Jens Veggerby (DEN)	Pierangelo Bincoletto (ITA); Bruno Holenweger (SUI)	Adriano Baffi (ITA); Rolf Sørensen (DEN)
1992	Danny Clark (AUS); Urs Freuler (SUI)	Etienne De Wilde (BEL); Constant Tourné (BEL)	Pierangelo Bincoletto (ITA); Jens Veggerby (DEN)
1993	Rolf Sørensen (DEN); Jens Veggerby (DEN)	Danny Clark (AUS); Tony Doyle (GBR)	Pierangelo Bincoletto (ITA); Etienne De Wilde (BEL)
1994	Kurt Betschart (SUI); Bruno Risi (SUI)	Jens Veggerby (DEN); Etienne De Wilde (BEL)	Urs Freuler (SUI); Bjarne Riis (DEN)
1995	Danny Clark (AUS); Jimmi Madsen (DEN)	Rolf Sørensen (DEN); Jens Veggerby (DEN)	Etienne De Wilde (BEL); Urs Freuler (SUI)
1996	Kurt Betschart (SUI); Bruno Risi (SUI)	Silvio Martinello (ITA); Marco Villa (ITA)	Jimmi Madsen (DEN); Jens Veggerby (DEN)
1997	Jimmi Madsen (DEN); Jens Veggerby (DEN)	Silvio Martinello (ITA); Marco Villa (ITA)	Danny Clark (AUS); Matthew Gilmore (BEL)
1998	Silvio Martinello (ITA); Marco Villa (ITA)	Jimmi Madsen (DEN); Jens Veggerby (DEN)	Kurt Betschart (SUI); Bruno Risi (SUI)
1999	Tayeb Braikia (DEN); Jimmi Madsen (DEN)	Etienne De Wilde (BEL); Andreas Kappes (GER)	Silvio Martinello (ITA); Jesper Skibby (DEN)
2000-01	Not raced		
2002	Matthew Gilmore (BEL); Scott McGrory (AUS)	Jimmi Madsen (DEN); Michael Sandstød (DEN)	Kurt Betschart (SUI); Bruno Risi (SUI)
2003-04	Not raced		
2005	Jimmi Madsen (DEN); Jakob Piil (DEN)	Robert Slippens (NED); Danny Stam (NED)	Matthew Gilmore (BEL); Marco Villa (ITA)
2006	Robert Slippens (NED); Danny Stam (NED)	Kurt Betschart (SUI); Franco Marvulli (SUI)	Giovanni Lombardi (ITA); Jimmi Madsen (DEN)
2007	Franco Marvulli (SUI); Bruno Risi (SUI)	Jakob Piil (DEN); Alex Rasmussen (DEN)	Peter Schep (NED); Danny Stam (NED)
2008	Franco Marvulli (SUI); Bruno Risi (SUI)	Michael Mørkøv (DEN); Alex Rasmussen (DEN)	Iljo Keisse (BEL); Danny Stam (NED)
2009	Michael Mørkøv (DEN); Alex Rasmussen (DEN)	Peter Schep (NED); Danny Stam (NED)	Franco Marvulli (SUI); Bruno Risi (SUI)
2010	Michael Mørkøv (DEN); Alex Rasmussen (DEN)	Robert Bartko (GER); Iljo Keisse (BEL)	Franco Marvulli (SUI); Bruno Risi (SUI)
2011	Michael Mørkøv (DEN); Alex Rasmussen (DEN)	Marc Hester (DEN); Jens-Erik Madsen (DEN)	Léon van Bon (NED); Danny Stam (NED)
2012	Marc Hester (DEN); Iljo Keisse (BEL)	Michael Mørkøv (DEN); Alex Rasmussen (DEN)	Robert Bartko (GER); Leif Lampater (GER)
2013	Lasse Norman Hansen (DEN); Michael Mørkøv (DEN)	Leif Lampater (GER); Luke Roberts (AUS)	Franco Marvulli (SUI); Jesper Mørkøv (DEN)
2014	Robert Bartko (GER); Marcel Kalz (GER)	Michael Mørkøv (DEN); Alex Rasmussen (DEN)	Marc Hester (DEN); Leif Lampater (GER)
2015	Michael Mørkøv (DEN); Alex Rasmussen (DEN)	Christian Grasmann (GER); Jesper Mørkøv (DEN)	Leif Lampater (GER); Marcel Kalz (GER)
2016	Jesper Mørkøv (DEN); Alex Rasmussen (DEN)	Kenny De Ketele (BEL); Moreno De Pauw (BEL)	Andreas Graf (AUT); Andreas Müller (AUT)
2017	Lasse Norman Hansen (DEN); Michael Mørkøv (DEN)	Kenny De Ketele (BEL); Moreno De Pauw (BEL)	Yoeri Havik (NED); Wim Stroetinga (NED)
2018	Kenny De Ketele (BEL); Michael Mørkøv (DEN)	Moreno De Pauw (BEL); Yoeri Havik (NED)	Marc Hester (DEN); Leif Lampater (GER)
2019	Kenny De Ketele (BEL); Moreno De Pauw (BEL)	Michael Mørkøv (DEN); Oliver Wulff (DEN)	Matias Malmberg (DEN); Yoeri Havik (NLD)
