= Six Days of Zürich =

Cycling race

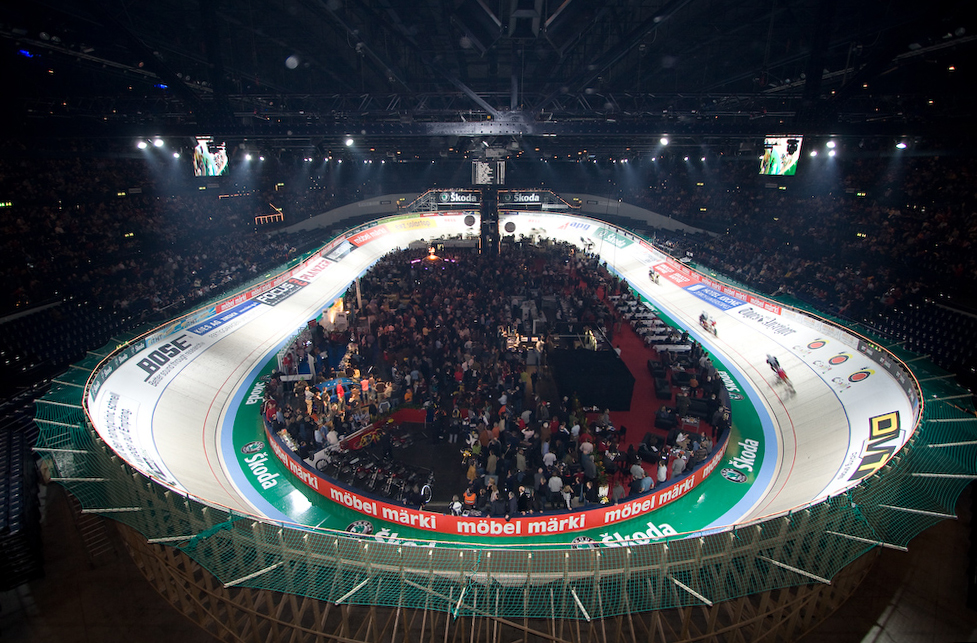
- Six days Zürich

Race details
- Region: Zürich, Switzerland
- Discipline: Track
- Type: Six-day racing
- Web site: www.sixdays-zuerich.ch

History
- First edition: 1954
- Final edition: 2014
- First winner: Hugo Koblet (SUI); Armin von Büren (SUI)
- Final winner: Mark Cavendish (GBR); Iljo Keisse (BEL)

The Six Days of Zürich was a six-day track cycling race held annually in Zürich, Switzerland. The event was first held in 1954 and the final edition was held in 2014.

== Winners ==
Year	Winners	Second	Third
1954	Hugo Koblet (SUI); Armin von Büren (SUI)	Walter Bucher (SUI); Jean Roth (SUI)	Gerrit Peters (NED); Gerrit Schulte (NED)
1955	Walter Bucher (SUI); Jean Roth (SUI)	Gerrit Peters (NED); Gerrit Schulte (NED)	Dominique Forlini (FRA); Georges Senfftleben (FRA)
1956	Key-Werner Nielsen (DEN); Gerrit Schulte (NED)	Walter Bucher (SUI); Jean Roth (SUI)	Reginald Arnold (AUS); Ferdinando Terruzzi (ITA)
1957	Gerrit Schulte (NED); Armin Von Büren (SUI)	Emile Severeyns (BEL); Rik Van Steenbergen (BEL)	Walter Bucher (SUI); Jean Roth (SUI)
1958	Fritz Pfenninger (SUI); Jean Roth (SUI)	Emile Severeyns (BEL); Rik Van Steenbergen (BEL)	Reginald Arnold (AUS); Ferdinando Terruzzi (ITA)
1959	Emile Severeyns (BEL); Rik Van Steenbergen (BEL)	Reginald Arnold (AUS); Walter Bucher (SUI)	Peter Post (NED); Gerrit Schulte (NED)
1960	Palle Lykke Jensen (DEN); Key-Werner Nielsen (DEN)	Walter Bucher (SUI); Fritz Pfenninger (SUI)	Reginald Arnold (AUS); Ferdinando Terruzzi (ITA)
1961	Emile Severeyns (BEL); Rik Van Steenbergen (BEL)	Klaus Bugdahl (FRG); Fritz Pfenninger (SUI)	Peter Post (NED); Rik Van Looy (BEL)
1962	Klaus Bugdahl (FRG); Fritz Pfenninger (SUI)	Rudi Altig (FRG); Sigi Renz (FRG)	Freddy Eugen (DEN); Palle Lykke Jensen (DEN)
1963	Fritz Pfenninger (SUI); Peter Post (NED)	Klaus Bugdahl (FRG); Sigi Renz (FRG)	Rik Van Looy (BEL); Rik Van Steenbergen (BEL)
1964	Fritz Pfenninger (SUI); Peter Post (NED)	Emile Severeyns (BEL); Rik Van Steenbergen (BEL)	Freddy Eugen (DEN); Palle Lykke Jensen (DEN)
1965	Fritz Pfenninger (SUI); Peter Post (NED)	Freddy Eugen (DEN); Palle Lykke Jensen (DEN)	Rudi Altig (FRG); Dieter Kemper (FRG)
1966	Rudi Altig (FRG); Sigi Renz (FRG)	Fritz Pfenninger (SUI); Peter Post (NED)	Klaus Bugdahl (FRG); Patrick Sercu (BEL)
1967	Freddy Eugen (DEN); Palle Lykke Jensen (DEN)	Klaus Bugdahl (FRG); Patrick Sercu (BEL)	Fritz Pfenninger (SUI); Peter Post (NED)
1968	Klaus Bugdahl (FRG); Fritz Pfenninger (SUI)	Peter Post (NED); Patrick Sercu (BEL)	Dieter Kemper (FRG); Horst Oldenburg (FRG)
1969	Klaus Bugdahl (FRG); Dieter Kemper (FRG)	Louis Pfenninger (SUI); Peter Post (NED)	Patrick Sercu (BEL); Alain van Lancker (FRA)
1970	Fritz Pfenninger (SUI); Erich Spahn (SUI); Peter Post (NED)	Rudi Altig (FRG); Albert Fritz (FRG); Louis Pfenninger (SUI)	Sigi Renz (FRG); Jürgen Schneider (SUI); Patrick Sercu (BEL)
1971	Klaus Bugdahl (FRG); Dieter Kemper (FRG); Louis Pfenninger (SUI)	Albert Fritz (FRG); Sigi Renz (FRG); Fritz Pfenninger (SUI)	Wilfried Peffgen (FRG); Wolfgang Schulze (FRG); Erich Spahn (SUI)
1972	Albert Fritz (FRG); Wilfried Peffgen (FRG); Graeme Gilmore (AUS)	Sigi Renz (FRG); Wolfgang Schulze (FRG); Erich Spahn (SUI)	Klaus Bugdahl (FRG); Dieter Kemper (FRG); Louis Pfenninger (SUI)
1973	Léo Duyndam (NED); Piet de Wit (NED)	Albert Fritz (FRG); Cees Stam (NED)	Louis Pfenninger (SUI); Erich Spahn (SUI)
1974	Klaus Bugdahl (FRG); Graeme Gilmore (AUS)	Léo Duyndam (NED); Louis Pfenninger (SUI)	Günther Haritz (FRG); Udo Hempel (FRG)
1975	Günther Haritz (FRG); Patrick Sercu (BEL)	Udo Hempel (FRG); René Savary (SUI)	René Pijnen (NED); Roy Schuiten (NED)
1976	Albert Fritz (FRG); Wilfried Peffgen (FRG)	Günther Haritz (FRG); René Pijnen (NED)	Klaus Bugdahl (FRG); Patrick Sercu (BEL)
1977	Eddy Merckx (BEL); Patrick Sercu (BEL)	Daniel Gisiger (SUI); René Pijnen (NED)	Udo Hempel (FRG); René Savary (SUI)
1978	René Pijnen (NED); René Savary (SUI)	Donald Allan (AUS); Danny Clark (AUS)	Albert Fritz (FRG); Wilfried Peffgen (FRG)
1979	Albert Fritz (FRG); Patrick Sercu (BEL)	René Pijnen (NED); René Savary (SUI)	Donald Allan (AUS); Danny Clark (AUS)
1980	Roman Hermann (LIE); Horst Schütz (FRG)	Albert Fritz (FRG); Udo Hempel (FRG)	Gert Frank (DEN); Jørgen Marcussen (DEN)
1981	Albert Fritz (FRG); Dietrich Thurau (FRG)	Urs Freuler (SUI); René Savary (SUI)	René Pijnen (NED); Patrick Sercu (BEL)
1982	Robert Dill-Bundi (SUI); Urs Freuler (SUI)	Danny Clark (AUS); Patrick Sercu (BEL)	Albert Fritz (FRG); Henry Rinklin (FRG)
1983	Urs Freuler (SUI); Daniel Gisiger (SUI)	Gert Frank (DEN); Hans-Henrik Ørsted (DEN)	Albert Fritz (FRG); Dietrich Thurau (FRG)
1984	Urs Freuler (SUI); Daniel Gisiger (SUI)	Josef Kristen (FRG); Henry Rinklin (FRG)	Tony Doyle (GBR); Gary Wiggins (AUS)
1985	Gert Frank (DEN); René Pijnen (NED)	Urs Freuler (SUI); Daniel Gisiger (SUI)	Roman Hermann (LIE); Sigmund Hermann (LIE)
1986	Urs Freuler (SUI); Daniel Gisiger (SUI)	Stan Tourné (BEL); Etienne De Wilde (BEL)	Joaquim Schlaphoff (FRG); Dietrich Thurau (FRG)
1987	Urs Freuler (SUI); Dietrich Thurau (FRG)	Tony Doyle (GBR); Roman Hermann (LIE)	Volker Diehl (FRG); Roland Günther (FRG)
1988	Daniel Gisiger (SUI); Jörg Müller (SUI)	Adriano Baffi (ITA); Pierangelo Bincoletto (ITA)	Urs Freuler (SUI); Roman Hermann (LIE)
1989	Adriano Baffi (ITA); Pierangelo Bincoletto (ITA)	Daniel Gisiger (SUI); Jörg Müller (SUI)	Acácio da Silva (POR); Sigmund Hermann (LIE)
1990	Adriano Baffi (ITA); Pierangelo Bincoletto (ITA)	Urs Freuler (SUI); Hansruedi Maerki (SUI)	Stephan Joho (SUI); Werner Stutz (SUI)
1991	Stephan Joho (SUI); Werner Stutz (SUI)	Etienne De Wilde (BEL); Bruno Holenweger (SUI)	Kurt Betschart (SUI); Bruno Risi (SUI)
1992	Kurt Betschart (SUI); Bruno Risi (SUI)	Adriano Baffi (ITA); Pierangelo Bincoletto (ITA)	Urs Freuler (SUI); Peter Pieters (NED)
1993	Kurt Betschart (SUI); Bruno Risi (SUI)	Etienne De Wilde (BEL); Jens Veggerby (DEN)	Adriano Baffi (ITA); Pierangelo Bincoletto (ITA)
1994	Urs Freuler (SUI); Carsten Wolf (GER)	Kurt Betschart (SUI); Bruno Risi (SUI)	Adriano Baffi (ITA); Etienne De Wilde (BEL)
1995	Kurt Betschart (SUI); Bruno Risi (SUI)	Silvio Martinello (ITA); Marco Villa (ITA)	Etienne De Wilde (BEL); Andreas Kappes (GER)
1996	Kurt Betschart (SUI); Bruno Risi (SUI)	Silvio Martinello (ITA); Marco Villa (ITA)	Andreas Kappes (GER); Carsten Wolf (GER)
1997	Silvio Martinello (ITA); Marco Villa (ITA)	Kurt Betschart (SUI); Bruno Risi (SUI)	Adriano Baffi (ITA); Joan Llaneras (ESP)
1998	Kurt Betschart (SUI); Bruno Risi (SUI)	Silvio Martinello (ITA); Marco Villa (ITA)	Jimmi Madsen (DEN); Scott McGrory (AUS)
1999	Kurt Betschart (SUI); Bruno Risi (SUI)	Matthew Gilmore (AUS); Scott McGrory (AUS)	Andreas Kappes (GER); Jimmi Madsen (DEN)
2000	Kurt Betschart (SUI); Bruno Risi (SUI); Markus Zberg (SUI)	Adriano Baffi (ITA); Joan Llaneras (ESP); Pascal Richard (SUI)	Tayeb Braikia (DEN); Jimmi Madsen (DEN); Beat Zberg (SUI)
2001	Matthew Gilmore (AUS); Scott McGrory (AUS); Daniel Schnider (SUI)	Niki Aebersold (SUI); Andreas Beikirch (GER); Jimmi Madsen (DEN)	Kurt Betschart (SUI); Bruno Risi (SUI); Markus Zberg (SUI)
2002– 2005	Not raced		
2006	Franco Marvulli (SUI); Bruno Risi (SUI)	Robert Bartko (GER); Iljo Keisse (BEL)	Guido Fulst (GER); Leif Lampater (GER)
2007	Franco Marvulli (SUI); Bruno Risi (SUI)	Robert Bartko (GER); Iljo Keisse (BEL)	Michael Mørkøv (DEN); Danny Stam (NED)
2008	Bruno Risi (SUI); Danny Stam (NED)	Joan Llaneras (ESP); Franco Marvulli (SUI)	Alexander Äschbach (SUI); Leif Lampater (GER)
2009	Franco Marvulli (SUI); Bruno Risi (SUI)	Christian Grasmann (GER); Leif Lampater (GER)	Alexander Äschbach (SUI); Tristan Marguet (SUI)
2010	Robert Bartko (GER); Danilo Hondo (GER)	Alexander Äschbach (SUI); Franco Marvulli (SUI)	Léon van Bon (NED); Danny Stam (NED)
2011	Iljo Keisse (BEL); Franco Marvulli (SUI)	Silvan Dillier (SUI); Glenn O'Shea (AUS)	Robert Bartko (GER); Danilo Hondo (GER)
2012	Kenny De Ketele (BEL); Peter Schep (NED)	Danilo Hondo (GER); Roger Kluge (GER)	Tristan Marguet (SUI); Franco Marvulli (SUI)
2013	Silvan Dillier (SUI); Iljo Keisse (BEL)	Jasper De Buyst (BEL); Kenny De Ketele (BEL)	David Muntaner (ESP); Albert Torres (ESP)
2014	Mark Cavendish (GBR); Iljo Keisse (BEL)	Silvan Dillier (SUI); Leif Lampater (GER)	Jasper De Buyst (BEL); Kenny De Ketele (BEL)
