= Six Days of Aarhus =

Cycling race

Race details
- Region: Aarhus, Denmark
- Local name(s): Seksdagesløbet i Århus (in Danish)
- Discipline: Track
- Type: Six-day racing

History
- First edition: 1954
- Editions: 9
- Final edition: 1961
- First winner: Georges Senfftleben (FRA); Roger Godeau (FRA)
- Most wins: Kay Werner Nielsen (DEN) (3 wins)
- Final winner: Palle Lykke (DEN); Kay Werner Nielsen (DEN)

The Six Days of Aarhus was a short-lived six-day track cycling race held annually in Aarhus, Denmark.

Kay Werner Nielsen holds the record of victories, winning 3 times.

== Winners ==
Year	Winner	Second	Third
1954 (feb)	(France) Georges Senfftleben (France) Roger Godeau	(Switzerland) Jean Roth (Switzerland) Walter Bucher	(Switzerland) Oscar Plattner (Netherlands) Arie Van Vliet
1954 (nov)	(Australia) Alfred Strom (Australia) Sydney Patterson	(Denmark) Kay Werner Nielsen (Denmark) Evan Klamer	(Germany) Heinz Zoll (Germany) Herbert Weinrich
1955	(Denmark) Kay Werner Nielsen (Denmark) Evan Klamer	(Germany) Heinz Zoll (Germany) Herbert Weinrich	(France) Pierre Iacoponelli (Italy) Ferdinando Terruzzi
1956	(Switzerland) Jean Roth (Switzerland) Walter Bucher	(France) Dominique Forlini (France) Georges Senfftleben	(Denmark) Kay Werner Nielsen (Denmark) Keld Leveau
1957	(Switzerland) Oscar Plattner (Switzerland) Fritz Pfenninger	(Denmark) Kay Werner Nielsen (Denmark) Evan Klamer	(Italy) Ferdinando Terruzzi (Germany) Herbert Weinrich
1958	(Denmark) Kay Werner Nielsen (Denmark) Palle Lykke	(Switzerland) Jean Roth (Switzerland) Fritz Pfenninger	(Italy) Ferdinando Terruzzi (Denmark) Knud Linge
1959	(Italy) Ferdinando Terruzzi (Denmark) Knud Linge	(Denmark) Kay Werner Nielsen (Denmark) Palle Lykke	(Switzerland) Jean Roth (Switzerland) Fritz Pfenninger
1960	(Belgium) Rik Van Steenbergen (Belgium) Emile Severeyns	(Denmark) Kay Werner Nielsen (Denmark) Palle Lykke	(Denmark) Bendy Pedersen (Denmark) Hans Andresen
1961	(Denmark) Kay Werner Nielsen (Denmark) Palle Lykke	(Switzerland) Oscar Plattner (Germany) Klaus Bugdahl	(Belgium) Rik Van Steenbergen (Belgium) Emile Severeyns
