= Kay Werner Nielsen =

Danish cyclist

Personal information
- Full name: Kay Werner Nielsen
- Born: 18 May 1921 Aarhus, Denmark
- Died: 13 March 2014 (aged 92) Copenhagen, Denmark

Cycling career
- Sport: Cycling
- Discipline: Track
- Role: Rider

Professional teams
- 1951–1953: Harthiner
- 1954–1956: Crescent

Kay Werner Nielsen (28 May 1921 in Aarhus – 13 March 2014 in Copenhagen) was a Danish cyclist.

== Major results ==
1948
1st National Individual Pursuit Championships
1949
1st National Individual Pursuit Championships
1950
1st National Individual Pursuit Championships
1951
1st National Individual Pursuit Championships
1st Six Days of Copenhagen (with Oscar Plattner)
3rd World Individual Pursuit Championships
1952
1st National Individual Pursuit Championships
1st Six Days of Copenhagen (with Lucien Gillen)
1953
1st National Individual Pursuit Championships
2nd World Individual Pursuit Championships
1954
1st National Individual Pursuit Championships
1955
1st National Individual Pursuit Championships
1st Six Days of Copenhagen (with Evan Klamer)
1st Six Days of Aarhus (with Evan Klamer)
1956
1st National Individual Pursuit Championships
1st Six Days of Zurich (with Gerrit Schulte)
1st Six Days of Frankfurt (with Evan Klamer)
3rd World Individual Pursuit Championships
1957
1st National Individual Pursuit Championships
3rd European Madison Championships (with Evan Klamer)
1958
1st National Individual Pursuit Championships
1st Six Days of Aarhus (with Palle Lykke)
1st Six Days of Dortmund (with Palle Lykke)
1959
1st National Individual Pursuit Championships
1st Six Days of Copenhagen (with Palle Lykke)
1st Six Days of Frankfurt (with Palle Lykke)
1st Six Days of Berlin (with Palle Lykke)
2nd European Madison Championships (with Palle Lykke)
1960
1st National Individual Pursuit Championships
1st Six Days of Zurich (with Palle Lykke)
1st Six Days of Frankfurt (with Palle Lykke)
1961
1st Six Days of Aarhus (with Palle Lykke)
