= Lucien Gillen =

Luxembourgish cyclist

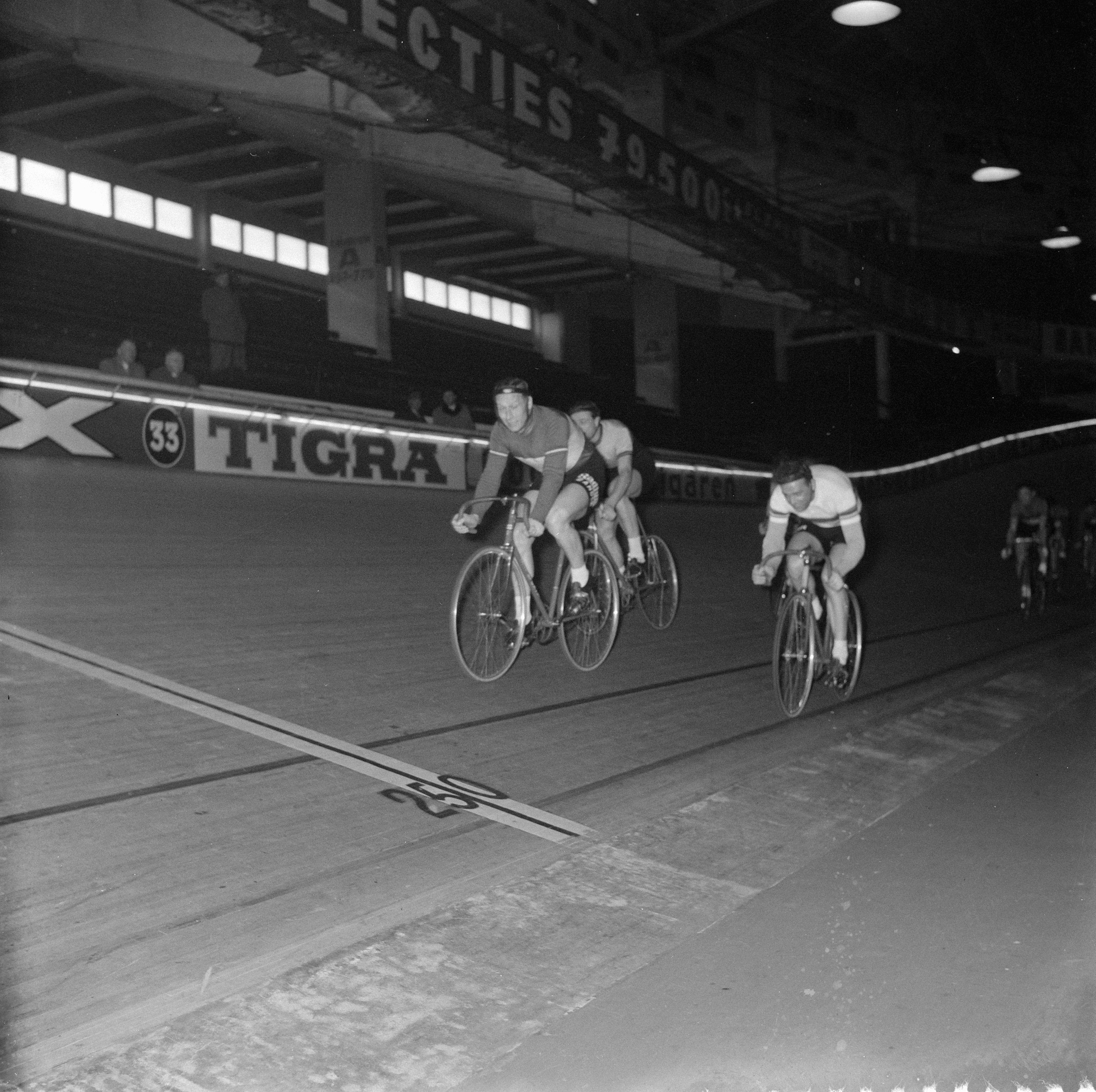
- Gillen (white shirt), 1958

Personal information
- Nickname: Lull
- Born: 7 October 1928 Luxembourg City
- Died: 11 August 2010 (aged 81) Luxembourg City
- Height: 187 cm (6 ft 2 in)

Cycling career
- Sport: Cycling
- Disciplines: Track, Road
- Role: Rider

Professional teams
- 1948–1951: Gillen
- 1952–1954: La Perle
- 1955–1956: Gillen
- 1957: Bertin
- 1958: Faema
- 1960: La Captivante
- 1960–1966: Ruberg

Lucien Gillen (7 October 1928 in Luxembourg City – 11 August 2010 in Luxembourg City) was a Luxembourgish cyclist.

Gillen followed in the footsteps of his father, Maurice Gillen, who worked as a train driver but also competed as a cyclist at the 1924 Summer Olympics. Although he competed on the road, his most significant successes were on the track: in the World Championship individual pursuit, which he competed in 19 times, he took the silver medal in 1949 behind Fausto Coppi, and took two bronze medals in 1952 and 1954. In 1955 Gillen also set a new world record for the 5 km individual pursuit at the opening of the Palazzo dello Sport in Milan, where he took two seconds off the old record held by Rolf Graf, recording a time of 6:19.2. He also competed in 143 six-day races, making his debut in 1948 at the Six Days of New York, where he and team-mate Mett Clemens finished second. He took a total of 11 six-day wins between 1953 and 1964. He retired from international competition in April 1966. After his cycling career, he worked in banking. He also served as President of Panathlon Luxembourg.

== Major results ==
=== Road ===
1948
3rd National Road Race Championships
1953
1st Stage 3 Tour de Luxembourg
1955
1st Overall Tour de l'Oise

1st Stage 1

1963
2nd National Road Race Championships

=== Track ===
1948
1st National Pursuit Championships
1st National Sprint Championships
1949
1st National Pursuit Championships
1st National Sprint Championships
2nd World Individual Pursuit Championships
1950
1st National Pursuit Championships
1st National Sprint Championships
1951
1st National Pursuit Championships
1st National Sprint Championships
1952
1st National Pursuit Championships
1st National Sprint Championships
1st Six Days of Copenhagen (with Kay Werner Nielsen)
3rd World Individual Pursuit Championships
1953
1st Six Days of Copenhagen (with Ferdinando Terruzzi)
1st Six Days of Dortmund (with Ferdinando Terruzzi)
1st Six Days of Saint-Étienne (with Ferdinando Terruzzi)
1954
1st Six Days of Copenhagen (with Ferdinando Terruzzi)
3rd World Individual Pursuit Championships
1955
1st National Pursuit Championships
1st National Sprint Championships
1st Six Days of Berlin (with Ferdinando Terruzzi)
1st Six Days of Ghent (with Ferdinando Terruzzi)
1956
1st National Pursuit Championships
1st National Sprint Championships
1st Six Days of Copenhagen (with Gerrit Schulte)
1959
1st Six Days of Münster (with Peter Post)
1964
1st National Pursuit Championships
1st National Sprint Championships
1st Six Days of Montreal (with Robert Lelangue)
1st Six Days of Quebec (with Emile Severeyns)
