= Six Days of Quebec =

Track cycling race

Race details
- Region: Quebec, Canada
- Local name(s): Six Jours de Québec (in French)
- Discipline: Track
- Type: Six-day racing

History
- First edition: 1964
- Editions: 3
- Final edition: 1966
- First winner: Emile Severeyns (BEL); Lucien Gillen (LUX)
- Most wins: Emile Severeyns (BEL) (2 wins)
- Final winner: Fritz Pfenninger (SUI); Sigi Renz (DEU)

The Quebec Six Days was a short-lived six-day track cycling race held in Quebec, Canada.

Only three editions were organized, from 1964 to 1966.

== Winners ==
Year	Winner	Second	Third
1964	(Belgium) Emile Severeyns (Luxembourg) Lucien Gillen	(Italy) Mino De Rossi (Italy) Ferdinando Terruzzi	(France) Roger Gaignard (France) André Retrain
1965	(Belgium) Emile Severeyns (Belgium) Rik Van Steenbergen	(Luxembourg) Lucien Gillen (Belgium) Robert Lelangue	(Switzerland) Fritz Pfenninger (West Germany) Sigi Renz
1966	(Switzerland) Fritz Pfenninger (West Germany) Sigi Renz	(Denmark) Freddy Eugen (Italy) Leandro Faggin	(Belgium) Emile Severeyns (Belgium) Robert Lelangue
