= Gerrit Schulte =

Dutch cyclist (1916–1992)

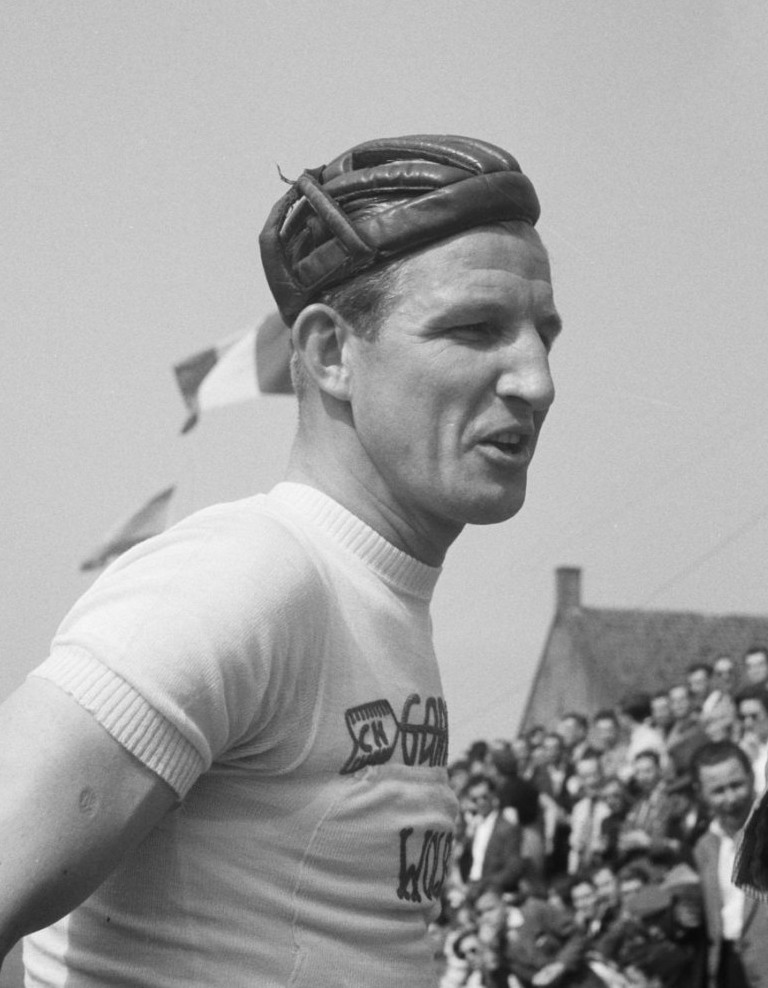
- Schulte in 1952

Personal information
- Full name: Gerrit Schulte
- Nickname: De Bossche Reus
- Born: 7 January 1916 Amsterdam, the Netherlands
- Died: 26 February 1992 (aged 76) Den Bosch, the Netherlands

Cycling career
- Sport: Cycling
- Disciplines: Road and track
- Role: Rider
Medal record
Men's cycling
Representing the Netherlands
World Championships, road
Bronze medal – third place	1956 Copenhagen	Road race
World Championships, track
Gold medal – first place	1948 Amsterdam	Individual pursuit

Gerrit Schulte (7 January 1916 – 26 February 1992) was a Dutch professional track bicycle racer. Between 1940 and 1960 he won 19 six-day races out of 73 starts and was one of the dominant Six days racers of his time. Schulte was as well successful in track pursuit, becoming national champion ten times, European champion twice and world champion once, in 1948, when he beat Fausto Coppi in the final. He was also successful as a road race cyclists, becoming national champion three times and winning a stage in the 1938 Tour de France. Since 1955, the Gerrit Schulte Trophy has been awarded by the national federation to the best professional rider in the Netherlands.

== Biography ==
=== Amateur career ===
Schulte competed at the 1936 Summer Olympics in the individual and team road races, but did not finish. Next year he turned professional.

=== 1938 Tour de France ===
In the 1938 Tour de France, Schulte joined as a member of the Dutch team. He won the third stage, and abandoned the race in the eighth stage. After that, he went to Paris, and won 10.000 francs in a criterium. His team mate Theo Middelkamp did finish the 1938 Tour, and also won a stage, but Middelkamp only won 8.000 francs during the Tour. They both decided to never return to the Tour, because in other races they could win more money.

=== Later life ===
Since 1955, every year the Gerrit Schulte Trophy is awarded by the national federation to the best professional rider in the Netherlands, and Schulte himself has won it once in 1958. After retiring from competitions he worked as a cycling coach and managed the restaurant in De Vliert, the football stadium of his home town Den Bosch.

== Major results ==
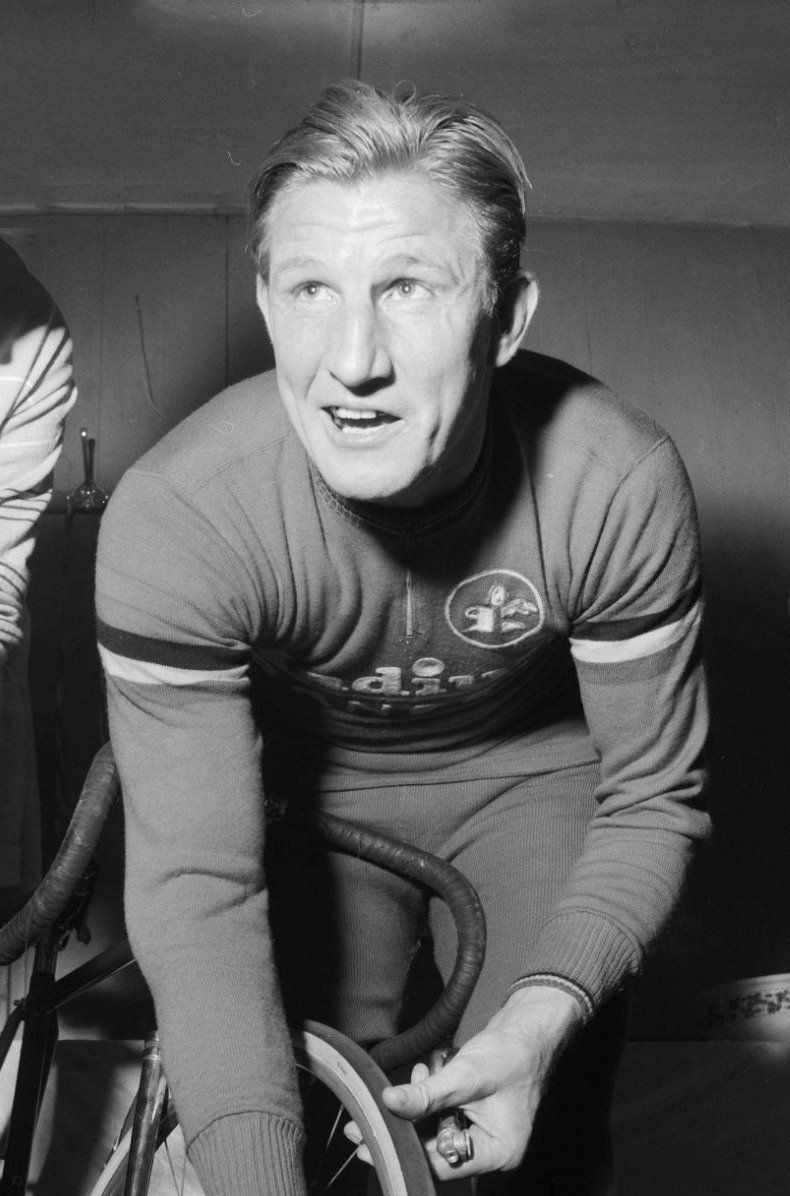
Schulte before his last race in Antwerpen in March 1960

1937
Dussen
Ronde van Gouda, Amateurs
Hoogerheide
1938
Antwerpen
Purmerend
Oss
Vinkeveen
Eindhoven
Tour de France:

Winner stage 3

1939
Acht van Chaam
Antwerpen
Zaandam
Baarle-Hertog
Namur
1940
national track pursuit championship
Six Days of Antwerp (with Gerrit Boeyen)
Gent
1941
national track pursuit championship
1942
national track pursuit championship
Roermond
Hilversum
1943
national track pursuit championship
Roermond
1944
national track pursuit championship
Ronde van Gouda
Dutch National Road Race Championship
1945
national track pursuit championship
Beverwijk
1946
Six Days of Paris (with Gerrit Boeyen)
Tongeren
Hoensbroek
1947
Six Days of Ghent (with Gerrit Boeyen)
GP Stad Sint-Niklaas
national track pursuit championship
Six Days of Brussels (with Gerrit Boeyen)
1948
Brasschaat
Den Bosch
national track pursuit championship
Oss
World Champion Track Pursuit
Dutch National Road Race Championship
1949
European Track Championships

1st Madison (with Gerrit Boeyen)

Ronde van Nederland
Roosendaal
Temse
Six Days of Ghent (with Gerrit Boeyen)
Six Days of Antwerp (with Gerrit Boeyen)
Zwijndrecht
Willebroek
Den Bosch
1950
Antwerpen
Boucles de la Gartempe
European Track Championships

1st Madison (with Gerard Peters)

Six Days of Ghent (with Gerard Peters)
national track pursuit championship
Dutch National Road Race Championship
Six Days of Paris (with Gerard Peters)
Etten-Leur
1951
national track pursuit championship
Westerlo
1952
Sas van Gent, Sas van Gent
1953
Six Days of Paris (with Gerard Peters)
Dutch National Road Race Championship
Den Bosch
1954
Six Days of Berlin (with Gerard Peters, Emile Carrara and Dominique Forlini)
Six Days of Antwerp (with Gerard Peters)
Goes, Goes
1955
Six Days of Münster (with Gerard Peters)
Den Bosch
Helmond
1956
Den Bosch
Dussum
Helmond
Six Days of Zürich (with Kay Werner Nielsen)
Leuven
Six Days of Copenhagen (with Lucien Gillen)
1957
Six Days of Zürich (with Armin von Büren)
1958
Six Days of Berlin (with Klaus Bugdahl)
Den Bosch
Wevelgem
Hanret
1959
Six Days of Antwerp (with Klaus Bugdahl and Peter Post)
Six Days of Brussels (with Peter Post)
1960
Six Days of Antwerp (with Jan Plantaz and Peter Post)

== See also ==
- List of Dutch Olympic cyclists

Awards
Preceded by Anton Geesink	Dutch Sportsman of the Year; 1958	Succeeded by Arie van Houwelingen; Sjoukje Dijkstra
