= Palle Lykke =

Danish cyclist (1936–2013)

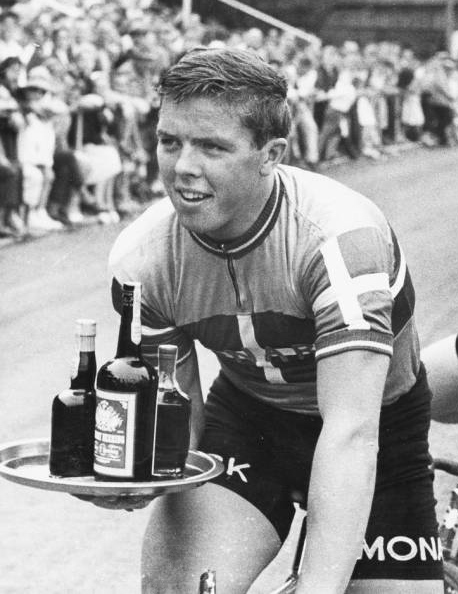
- Palle Lykke in 1956

Personal information
- Born: 4 November 1936 Ringe, Denmark
- Died: 19 April 2013 (aged 76) Antwerp, Belgium

Cycling career
- Sport: Cycling
- Disciplines: Track and road cycling

Major wins
- One-day races and Classics Kampioenschap van Vlaanderen (1954) Track Championships National Track Championships Sprint (1958, 1959, 1960, 1961)
Medal record
Representing Denmark
UEC European Track Championships
Silver medal – second place	1959	Madison
Gold medal – first place	1962	Madison
Bronze medal – third place	1963	Derny
Bronze medal – third place	1964	Derny
Silver medal – second place	1966	Madison
Silver medal – second place	1967	Derny

Palle Lykke Jensen (4 November 1936 – 19 April 2013) was a Danish cyclist who was active between 1956 and 1969. He competed at the 1956 Summer Olympics in the road race, but failed to finish. The same year he finished fourth at the world road championships. Starting from 1958 Jensen won four consecutive national sprint titles. Between 1958 and 1968 he also won six medals at European track championships and 21 six-day races out of 122 starts in Germany, Canada, Denmark, Belgium, Netherlands and UK. After marrying the daughter of Belgian cyclist Rik Van Steenbergen, in 1962 he moved to Belgium, where he worked at the Port of Antwerp. With Van Steenbergen, he competed in several Six-day events.

== Major results ==
=== Road ===
1965
1st Kampioenschap van Vlaanderen
1966
3rd Gent–Wevelgem

=== Track ===
1958
1st Danish National Track Championships, Sprint
1st Six Days of Aarhus (with Kay Werner Nielsen)
1st Six Days of Dortmund (with Kay Werner Nielsen)
1st Six Days of Berlin (with Kay Werner Nielsen)
1959
1st Danish National Track Championships, Sprint
1st Six Days of Frankfurt (with Kay Werner Nielsen)
1st Six Days of Copenhagen (with Kay Werner Nielsen)
European Track Championships

2nd Omnium
2nd Madison (with Kay Werner Nielsen)

1960
1st Danish National Track Championships, Sprint
1st Six Days of Frankfurt (with Kay Werner Nielsen)
1st Six Days of Zurich (with Kay Werner Nielsen)
1961
1st Danish National Track Championships, Sprint
1st Six Days of Aarhus (with Kay Werner Nielsen)
1st Grand Prix of Copenhagen, omnium
1962
European Track Championships

1st Omnium
1st Madison (with Rik Van Steenbergen)

1st Six Days of Brussels (with Rik Van Steenbergen)
1st Grand Prix of Copenhagen, omnium
1963
1st Six Days of Antwerp (with Rik Van Steenbergen & Leo Proost)
1st Six Days of Frankfurt (with Rik Van Steenbergen)
1st Six Days of Münster (with Freddy Eugen)
European Track Championships

3rd Derny

1964
1st Six Days of Montreal (with Emile Severeyns)

3rd Derny

1st Grand Prix of Copenhagen, omnium
1965
1st Six Days of Bremen (with Rik Van Steenbergen)
1st Six Days of Münster (with Freddy Eugen)
1966
1st Six Days of Montreal (with Emile Severeyns)
European Track Championships

2nd Madison (with Rik Van Steenbergen)

1967
1st Six Days of London (with Freddy Eugen)
1st Six Days of Montreal (with Freddy Eugen)
1st Six Days of Zurich (with Freddy Eugen)
1st Six Days of Amsterdam (with Freddy Eugen)
European Track Championships

2nd Derny

1968
1st Six Days of Berlin (with Freddy Eugen)
1st Grand Prix of Copenhagen, omnium
