= Emile Severeyns =

Belgian track cyclist and bicycle racer (1931–1979)

- Severeyns with the European champion jersey, pictured circa 1960

Personal information
- Born: 28 August 1931 Schoten, Belgium
- Died: 30 November 1979 (aged 48) Antwerp, Belgium

Cycling career
- Sport: Cycling
- Disciplines: Track; Road
- Role: Rider

Professional teams
- 1953: Van Hauwaert
- 1954–1955: Girardengo
- 1956–1960: Peugeot–BP–Dunlop
- 1961–1963: Solo–Van Steenbergen
- 1963–1965: G.B.C.–Libertas
- 1966: Goldor–Main d'Or–L'Hirondelle
- 1968: Goldor–Gerka–Main d'Or

Major wins
- Track Championships National Track Championships Madison (1961, 1962) European Track Championships Madison (1958, 1959, 1960, 1961)

Emile "Miel" Severeyns (28 August 1931 – 30 November 1979) was a Belgian road and track cyclist. Professional from 1953 to 1971, he won 25 six-day races, of which he secured 19 six-day victories with cycling legend Rik Van Steenbergen. The pair also claimed four consecutive European Madison titles in 1958, 1959, 1960 and 1961, as well as two national titles.

The partnership came to an end when Van Steenbergen teamed up with his son-in-law Palle Lyke in the winter of 1962. Severeyns went on to win six more Six-Day Races with other teammates.

In road cycling, he won the GP Briek Schotte twice. He also competed in the 1954 Giro d'Italia and the 1956 Vuelta a España.

== Major results ==
=== Track ===
1955
1st Six Days of Brussels (with Rik Van Steenbergen)
1st Six Days of Ghent (with Rik Van Steenbergen)
1956
1st Six Days of Dortmund (with Rik Van Steenbergen)
1st Six Days of Brussels (with Rik Van Steenbergen)
2nd Six Days of Antwerp (with Arsène Rijckaert and Rik Van Steenbergen)
2nd Six Days of Ghent (with Rik Van Steenbergen)
1957
1st Six Days of Berlin (with Rik Van Steenbergen)
2nd Six Days of Zurich (with Rik Van Steenbergen)
3rd Six Days of Antwerp (with Rik Van Steenbergen and Willy Vannitsen)
3rd Six Days of Brussels (with Rik Van Steenbergen)
1958
1st Madison, European Track Championships (with Rik Van Steenbergen)
1st Six Days of Antwerp (with Rik Van Steenbergen and Reginald Arnold)
1st Six Days of Brussels (with Rik Van Steenbergen)
1st Six Days of Copenhagen (with Rik Van Steenbergen)
1st Six Days of Frankfurt (with Rik Van Steenbergen)
2nd Six Days of Ghent (with Rik Van Steenbergen)
2nd Six Days of Zurich (with Rik Van Steenbergen)
2nd Six Days of Berlin (with Rik Van Steenbergen)
1959
1st Madison, European Track Championships (with Rik Van Steenbergen)
1st Six Days of Zurich (with Rik Van Steenbergen)
2nd Six Days of Brussels (with Rik Van Steenbergen)
2nd Six Days of Copenhagen (with Rik Van Steenbergen)
2nd Six Days of Berlin (with Rik Van Steenbergen)
3rd Six Days of Antwerp (with Rik Van Steenbergen)
1960
1st Madison, European Track Championships (with Rik Van Steenbergen)
1st Six Days of Aarhus (with Rik Van Steenbergen)
1st Six Days of Brussels (with Rik Van Steenbergen)
1st Six Days of Copenhagen (with Rik Van Steenbergen)
2nd Six Days of Antwerp (with Leo Proost and Rik Van Steenbergen)
2nd Six Days of Ghent (with Rik Van Steenbergen)
1961
1st Madison, European Track Championships (with Rik Van Steenbergen)
1st Madison, National Track Championships (with Rik Van Steenbergen)
1st Six Days of Zurich (with Rik Van Steenbergen)
1st Six Days of Dortmund (with Rik Van Steenbergen)
2nd Six Days of Cologne (with Rik Van Steenbergen)
2nd Six Days of Ghent (with Rik Van Steenbergen)
2nd Six Days of Brussels (with Rik Van Steenbergen)
2nd Six Days of Antwerp (with Gilbert Maes and Rik Van Steenbergen)
3rd Six Days of Aarhus (with Rik Van Steenbergen)
3rd Six Days of Berlin (with Rik Van Steenbergen)
1962
1st Madison, National Track Championships (with Rik Van Steenbergen)
1st Six Days of Zurich (with Rik Van Steenbergen)
1st Six Days of Cologne (with Rik Van Steenbergen)
1st Six Days of Milan (with Rik Van Steenbergen)
2nd Six Days of Antwerp (with Palle Lykke and Rik Van Steenbergen)
3rd Madison, European Track Championships (with Rik Van Steenbergen)
3rd Six Days of Berlin I (with Rik Van Steenbergen)
3rd Six Days of Berlin II (with Rik Van Steenbergen)
3rd Six Days of Brussels (with Emile Daems)
1963
3rd Madison, European Track Championships (with Reginald Arnold)
1964
1st Six Days of Montreal (with Palle Lykke)
1st Six Days of Quebec (with Lucien Gillen)
2nd Madison, National Track Championships (with Rik Van Steenbergen)
2nd Six Days of Zurich (with Rik Van Steenbergen)
1965
1st Six Days of Toronto (with Rik Van Steenbergen)
1st Six Days of Quebec (with Rik Van Steenbergen)
2nd Madison, European Track Championships (with Rik Van Steenbergen)
3rd Six Days of Ghent (with Rik Van Steenbergen)
1966
1st Six Days of Madrid (with Walter Godefroot)
1st Six Days of Montreal II (with Palle Lykke)
3rd Madison, National Track Championships (with Robert Lelangue)
1967
1st Six Days of Montreal I (with Patrick Sercu)
2nd Madison, National Track Championships (with Gilbert Maes)
3rd Six Days of Antwerp (with Leo Proost and Tom Simpson)
1968
1st Six Days of Antwerp (with Sigi Renz and Theo Verschueren)

=== Road ===
1953
1st GP Briek Schotte
1956
1st Heist-op-den-Berg
1957
1st GP Briek Schotte
1962
1st Elfstedenronde
