= Werner Grundahl =

Danish cyclist (1914–1952)

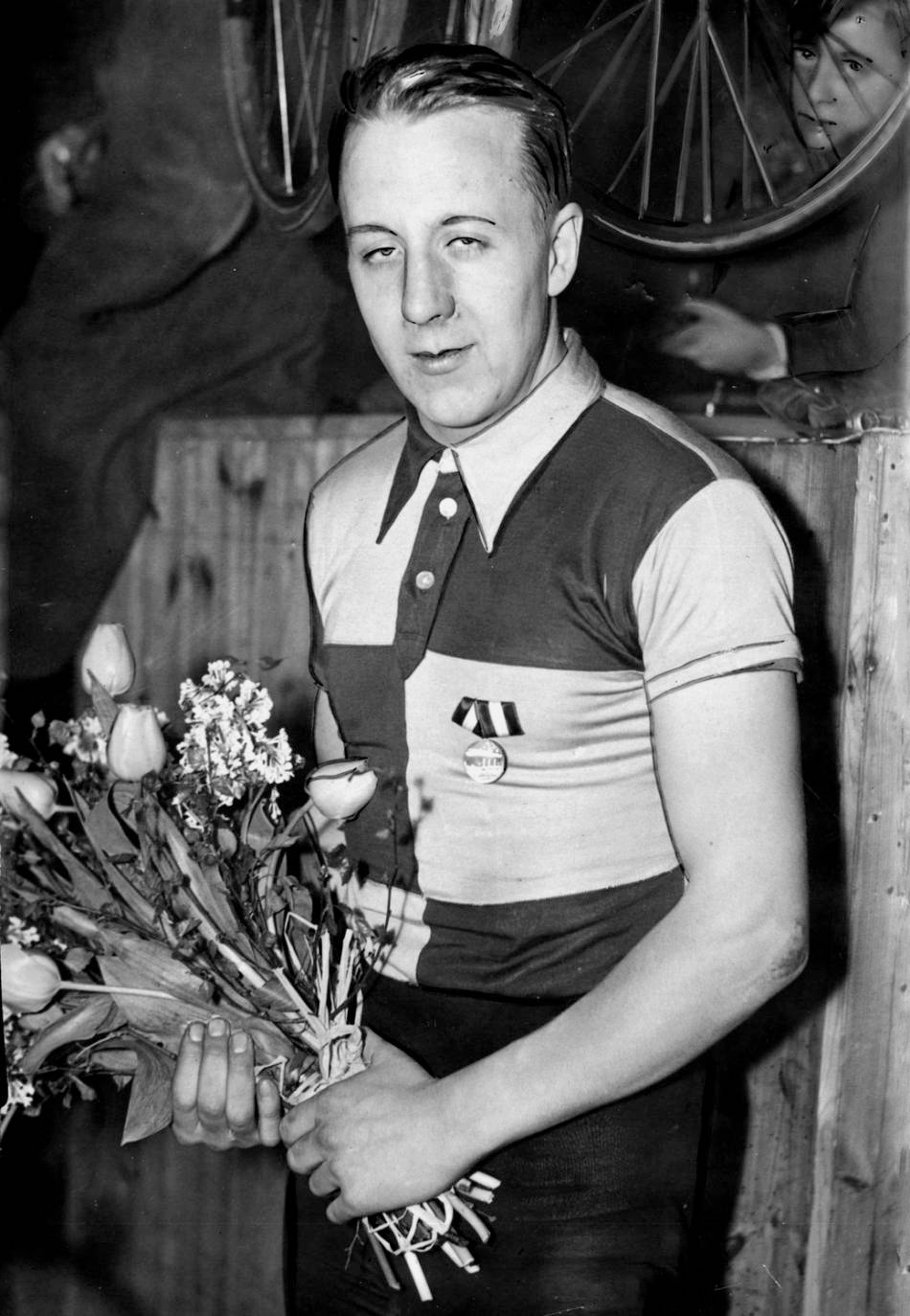
- Werner Grundahl in 1933

Personal information
- Born: 22 August 1914 Copenhagen, Denmark
- Died: 22 December 1952 (aged 38)

Sport
- Sport: Cycling
- Event: Road
Medal record
Representing Denmark
World championships
Bronze medal – third place	1935 Floreffe	Amateur's road race

Werner Grundahl Hansen (22 August 1914 – 22 December 1952) was a Danish cyclist who won a bronze medal in the amateur's road race at the 1935 World Championships. After that he turned professional and competed both on the road and on track, winning a six-day race in his hometown of Copenhagen in 1936 and the national track pursuit title in 1939.
