= Fritz Pfenninger =

Swiss cyclist (1934–2001)

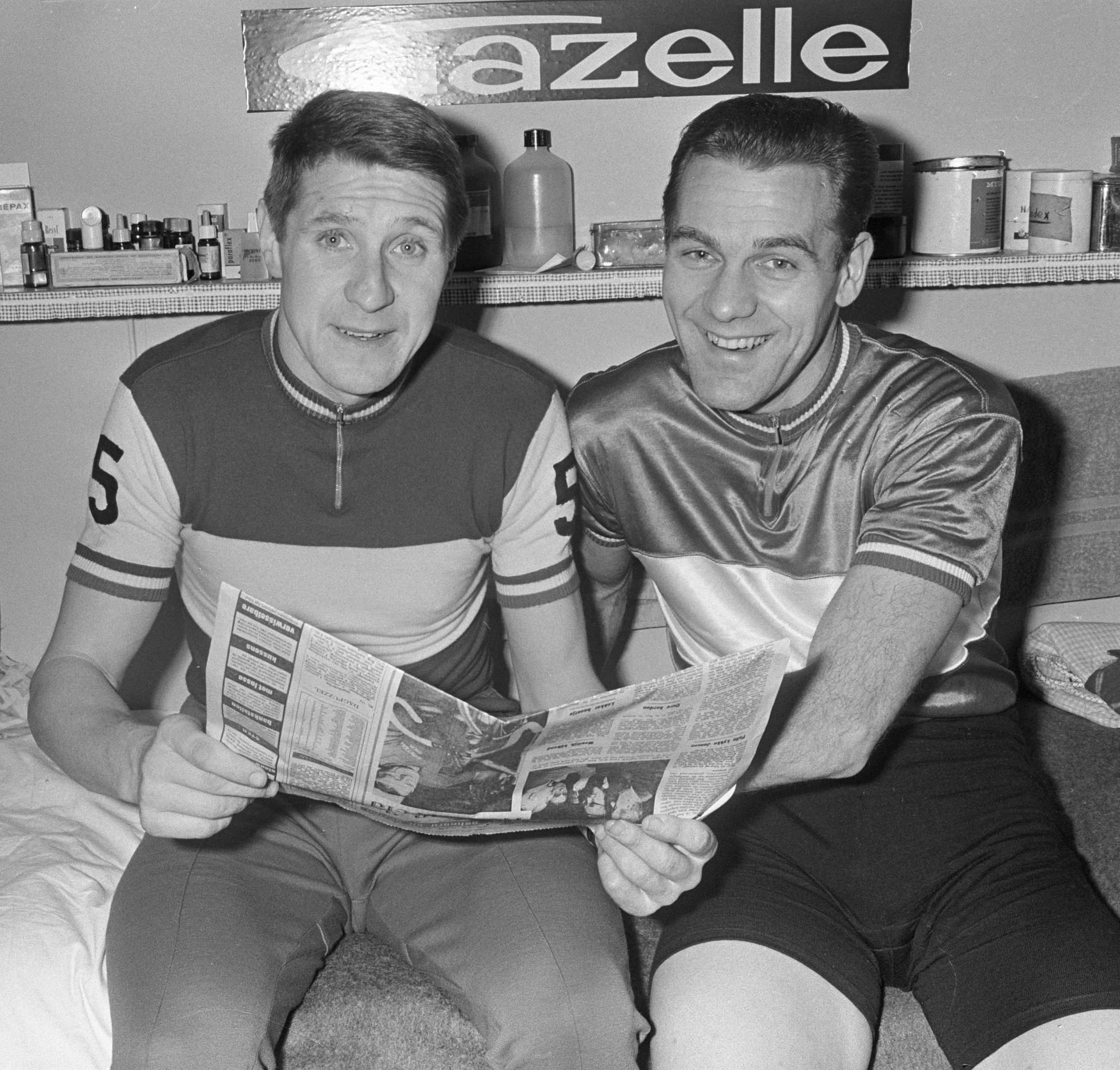
- Peter Post and Fritz Pfenninger in 1966

Personal information
- Born: 15 October 1934 Zurich, Switzerland
- Died: 12 May 2001 (aged 66) Zurich, Switzerland

Cycling career
- Sport: Cycling
- Discipline: Track
- Role: Rider

Professional teams
- 1955–1957: Allegro
- 1958–1960: Mondia
- 1961–1966: Ignis
- 1967–1969: Zimba
- 1970: G.B.C.–Zimba
- 1971–1972: Biofin

Fritz Pfenninger (15 October 1934 – 12 May 2001) was a Swiss cyclist. He was a specialist in six-day racing, winning a total of 33 events between 1956 and 1970, including 19 with Peter Post.

== Track honours ==
=== Six-day racing ===
- 1956 : Aarhus (with Oscar Plattner)
- 1957 : Copenhagen (with Jean Roth)
- 1958 : Münster, Zurich (with Jean Roth)
- 1960 : Münster (with Hans Junkermann)
- 1961 : Berlin, Frankfurt (with Klaus Bugdahl)
- 1962 : Essen, Frankfurt, Zurich (with Klaus Bugdahl)
- 1963 : Cologne, Zurich, Brussels (with Peter Post)
- 1964 : Dortmund (with Rudi Altig), Anvers (with Noël Foré and Peter Post), Berlin, Brussels, Zurich (with Peter Post)
- 1965 : Berlin, Dortmund, Zurich (with Peter Post)
- 1966 : Essen, Ghent, Amsterdam (with Peter Post), Anvers (with Jan Janssen and Peter Post), Quebec (with Sigi Renz)
- 1967 : Bremen, Essen, Frankfurt (with Peter Post), Anvers (with Jan Janssen and Peter Post)
- 1968 : Montreal (with Louis Pfenninger), Zurich (with Klaus Bugdahl)
- 1970 : Zurich (with Peter Post and Erich Spahn)

=== European Championships ===
- Champion of Europe in 1962 (with Klaus Bugdahl), 1964 and 1967 (with Peter Post)
