= Derny =

Motorized bicycle for motor-paced cycling events

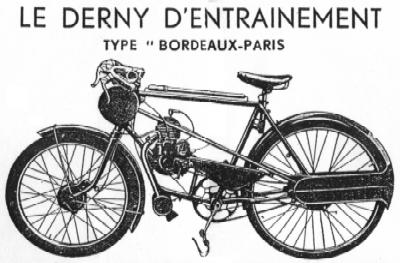
Derny publicity material

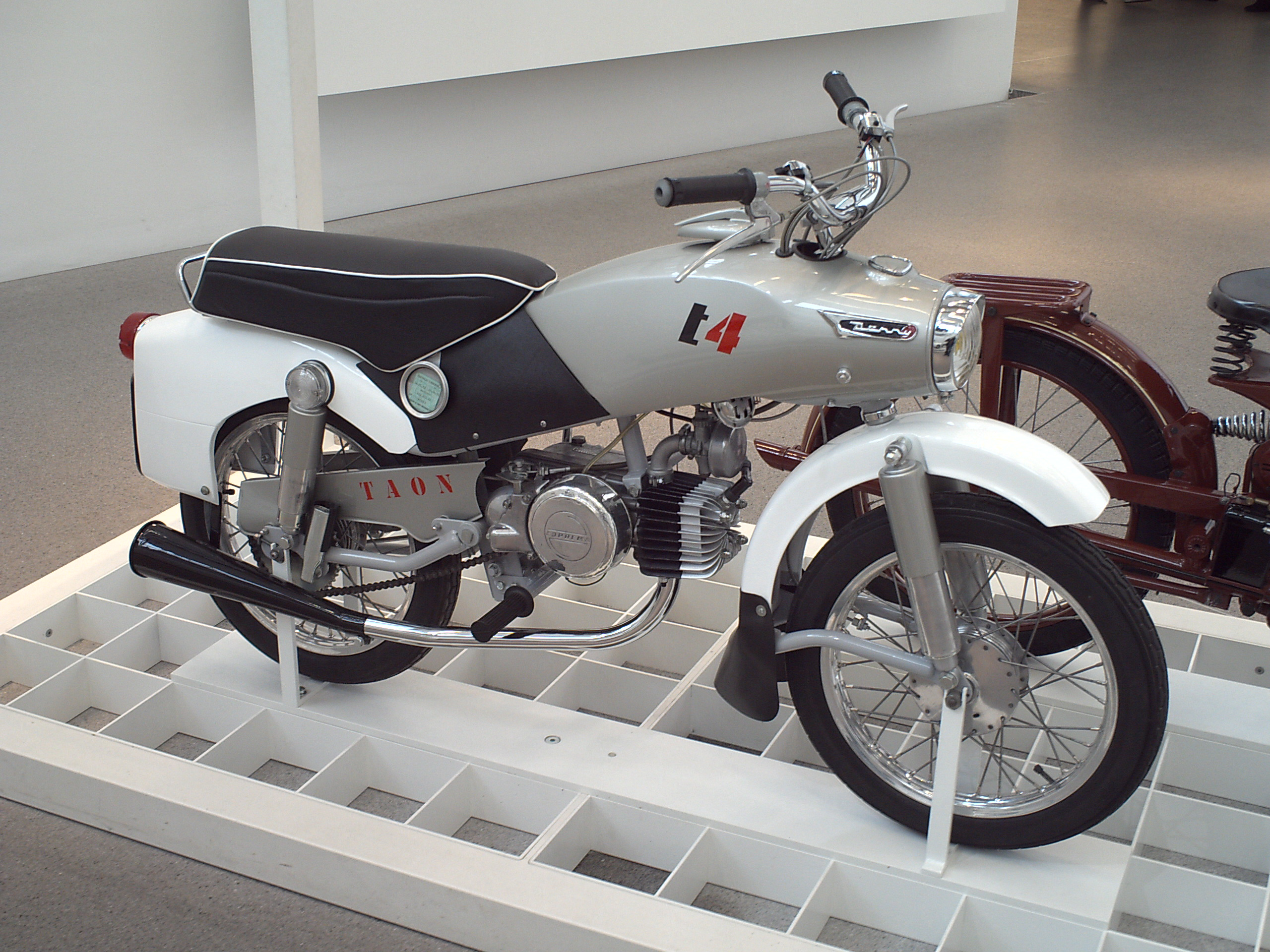
Derny Taon 125, 1955/1956

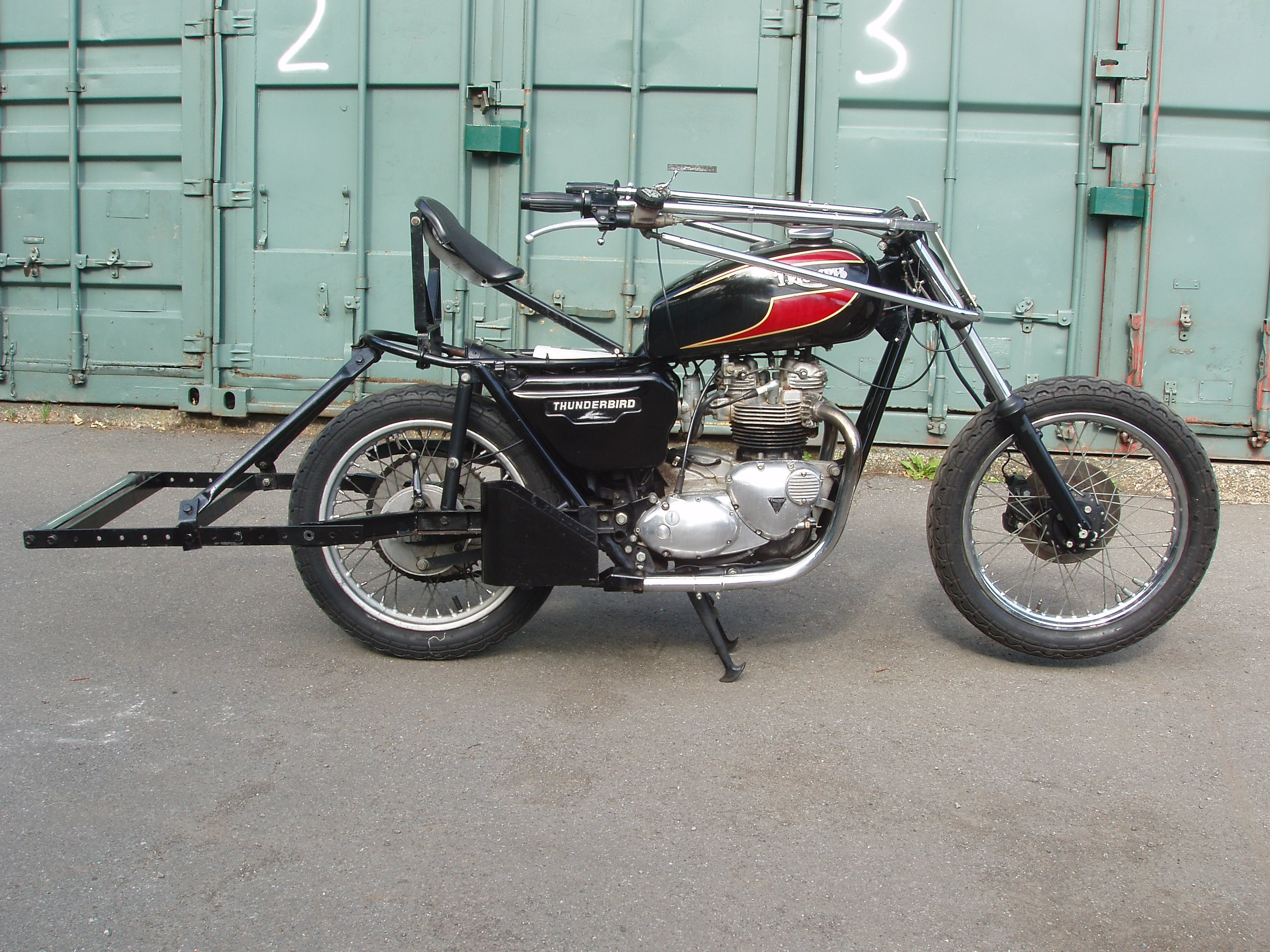
650cc Triumph TR65 Thunderbird "Stayer" first used at Leicester Velodrome in 1982 and now at Herne Hill Velodrome. Note the roller at the back and stood-up riding position that distinguish a Stayer from a true Derny.

A Derny is a motorized bicycle for motor-paced cycling events such as during six-day and Keirin racing and motor-paced road races. Some riders train behind a derny on the road. The Derny is so-called as it was originally produced by the French Derny firm, but the name Derny is now applied to all small cycle-pacing vehicles, regardless of manufacturer.

== The original Derny ==
The first Derny 'Entraineur' or 'Bordeaux–Paris' moped, with its petrol tank mounted ahead of the handlebars, was built by Roger Derny et Fils of the Avenue de St Mandé, Paris, France, in 1938. A fleet of Dernys was maintained for the long-established 'Bordeaux-Paris' road-race and the Derny was used for many other track and road events and for endurance training. Derny also built a touring adaptation called the 'Solo' and tandems and mopeds.

Being a moped, the Derny had both a 98 cc (6.0 cu in) Zurcher two-stroke engine and pedals on a chainring sprocket, typically with 70 teeth on the front and 11 on the rear-wheel sprocket. The combination allows for smooth acceleration and slowing, important when the rider taking pace is only centimetres from the Derny's rear wheel. A freewheel coupling between the motor and the back wheel ensures the derny will not stop dead if the motor seizes. Top speed, with rider pedalling, is up to 50 km/h (31 mph), depending on gearing. The firm closed in 1957, after an unsuccessful venture with the 'Taon', a Roger Tallon-designed motorcycle. Another company, Service Derny, of Rue Picpus, Paris, serviced and rebuilt machines into the 1970s.

== Dernys today ==
According to the Larousse dictionary, the name, derny has become a generic term for a small pacing motorcycle used in cycle races, and is now applied to all small cycle-pacing vehicles, regardless of manufacturer. There have been several attempts to copy or improve the original. One, the Burdin Motopacer, was briefly used, but proved neither durable nor fast enough for repeated high-speed riding on the steep tracks used in six-day racing. Simon Arie then started making pacers using Puch Maxi and Zurcher engines were made by a small company (Simon Sport) in Neerpelt, Belgium, and dernys were either new or had the original frames with new 90 cc (5.5 cu in) engines. Nowadays, electric pacers are used, such as the ELMOTO E-derny or Panasonic Cycle Technology XU1

Dernys are usually bump-started. They can then pace riders up to 90 km/h (56 mph), although races rarely exceed 80 km/h (50 mph).

Another type of pacer is the Stayer. The rider sits close to the back in an upright position to provide an envelope of low wind resistance for the cyclist drafting or slipstreaming behind. Also a roller is added behind the rear of the stayer as safety feature in case the rider bumps into it, and normally the cyclist rides on a bicycle with a slightly smaller front wheel. The photo of the Triumph motorcycle is such a stayer.

For most derny races, the cyclist sits in the slipstream for the duration of the event. In keirin races, common in Japan and familiar elsewhere, the derny brings riders up to speed then pulls off the track and the race finishes in a sprint without the pacer.

A small group of semi-professional pacers travels around Europe for the winter six-day season. Several are in their 60s and 70s and some have been pacing for more than 40 years.

In most of its later history, the 560 km (350 mi) Bordeaux–Paris classic road race was motor-paced using dernys from half-distance. Other important races on the road behind dernys have included the Critérium des As in Paris.

== See also ==
- Outline of cycling
