= Burdin =

Burdin is a surname. Notable people with the surname include:

- Claude Burdin (1788–1873), French engineer
- Sergey Burdin (born 1970), Russian footballer
