= Peter Post =

Dutch cyclist (1933–2011)

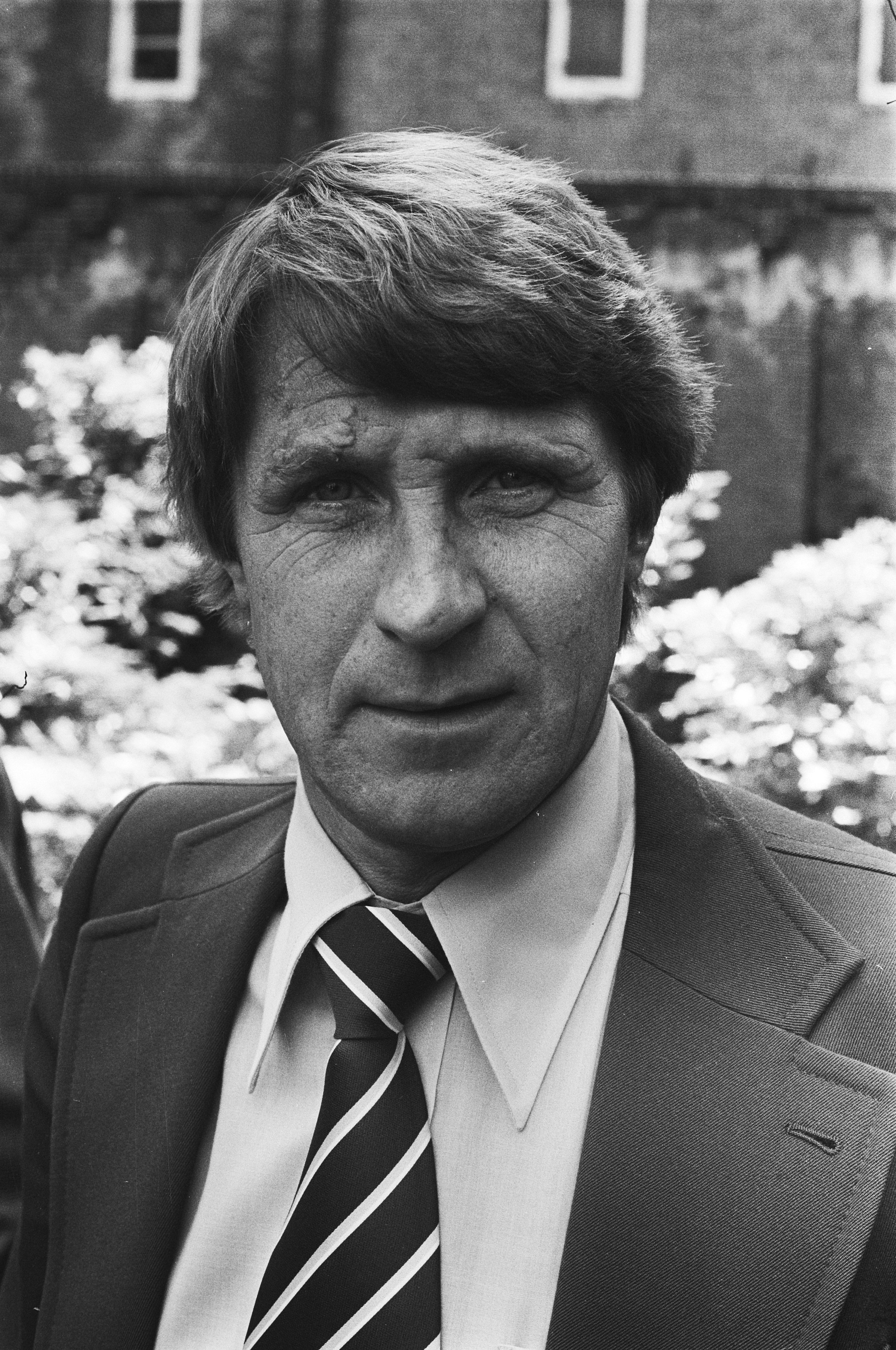
- Peter Post in 1977

Personal information
- Full name: Peter Post
- Nickname: De Keizer van de Zesdaagse (The Kaiser of the Six-days)
- Born: 12 November 1933 Amsterdam, the Netherlands
- Died: 14 January 2011 (aged 77) Amstelveen, the Netherlands

Cycling career
- Sport: Cycling
- Current team: Retired
- Discipline: Road/Track
- Role: Rider

Managerial teams
- 1974–1983: TI–Raleigh
- 1984–1992: Panasonic–Raleigh
- 1993–1994: Novemail–Histor–Laser Computer

Major wins
- Paris–Roubaix (1964); National road race champion (1963)

Peter Post (12 November 1933 – 14 January 2011) was a Dutch professional cyclist whose career lasted from 1956 to 1972. Post competed in road and track racing. As a rider he is best remembered for Six-day racing, having competed in 155 races and won 65. Because of this success he was known as “De Keizer van de Zesdaagse” or “The Emperor of the Six Days”. In road racing his main achievements were winning the 1964 Paris–Roubaix and becoming national road race champion in 1963. He was on the podium three times at the La Flèche Wallonne but never won. Post’s other nickname was “de Lange” or “Big Man”, because he was tall for a cyclist. After retiring from racing he had success as a directeur sportif. Post died in Amstelveen on 14 January 2011.

== Road career ==
Post turned professional in 1956 with the small Dutch team R.I.H. He rode for the first few years with Gerrit Schulte, a track rider who also rode on the road and was an inspiration to him. Notable early career successes on the road came when he won the Ronde van Nederland in 1960 and the 1962 Deutschland Tour. In 1963 he became national road race champion as well as winning the Tour of Belgium.

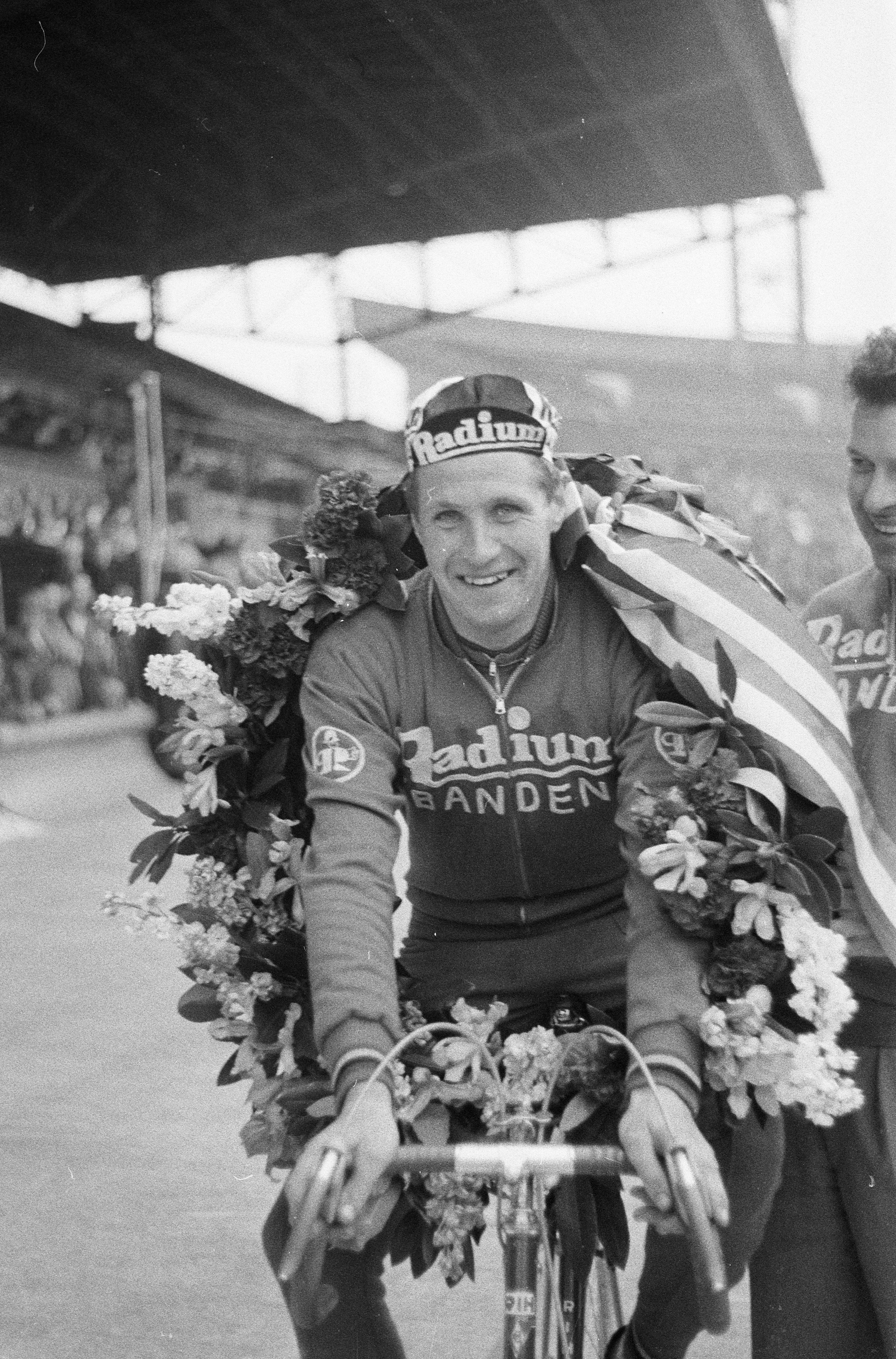
Post in 1960

Peter Post in the Tour the France of 1979 at the height of his success as directeur sportif

In 1964 Post had his finest moment in road racing when he became the first Dutchman to win Paris–Roubaix. The race was run at top speed from the start and favourites Rik Van Looy, Raymond Poulidor and Rudi Altig were caught out by the fast pace and missed the decisive break at Arras. Post’s team mate, Willy Bocklant, was in the break and sacrificed his chances by keeping the pace high for his leader. Five riders entered the velodrome at Roubaix with Post winning the sprint by beating the world champion Benoni Beheyt in the finishing straight. The high pace ensured that Post was also awarded the Ruban Jaune for the highest speed in a classic, the 265 km run at 45.131 km/h. This 1964 record was broken in 2017 by Greg Van Avermaet .

Post expressed satisfaction with his win; however, as a businessman, he also noted that it would lead to an increase in his appearance fees at winter six-day races. In 1965 Post made his only appearance in the Tour de France but he abandoned before Paris. (He subsequently acknowledged that he had doped at the Tour de France.) His only other noteworthy result on the road came in 1967 when he finished runner-up to Eddy Merckx in La Flèche Wallonne although he had wins in smaller races. Post was voted Dutch Sportsman of the year in 1964 and Dutch cyclist of the year in 1963 and 1970.

== Track career ==
Post rode his first six-day in 1956 and his first victory came in 1957 in Chicago, partnered by Harm Smits. Post had three partners with whom he had most success. In 1960 he teamed with Rik Van Looy and won ten sixes. In 1963 he formed his most successful partnership with the Swiss Fritz Pfenninger and they had 19 victories until 1967, when Post joined the Belgian Patrick Sercu, with whom he had 14 victories up to 1971 and his final and 65th six-day in Frankfurt. Post's 65 six-day wins stood as a record for a few years, beating Rik Van Steenbergen's 40 wins when at the Milan six in 1968 when partnered by Gianni Motta. However, since then René Pijnen (72 wins), Danny Clark (74 wins) and Patrick Sercu (88 wins) have all passed Post's total with Sercu as the new record holder.

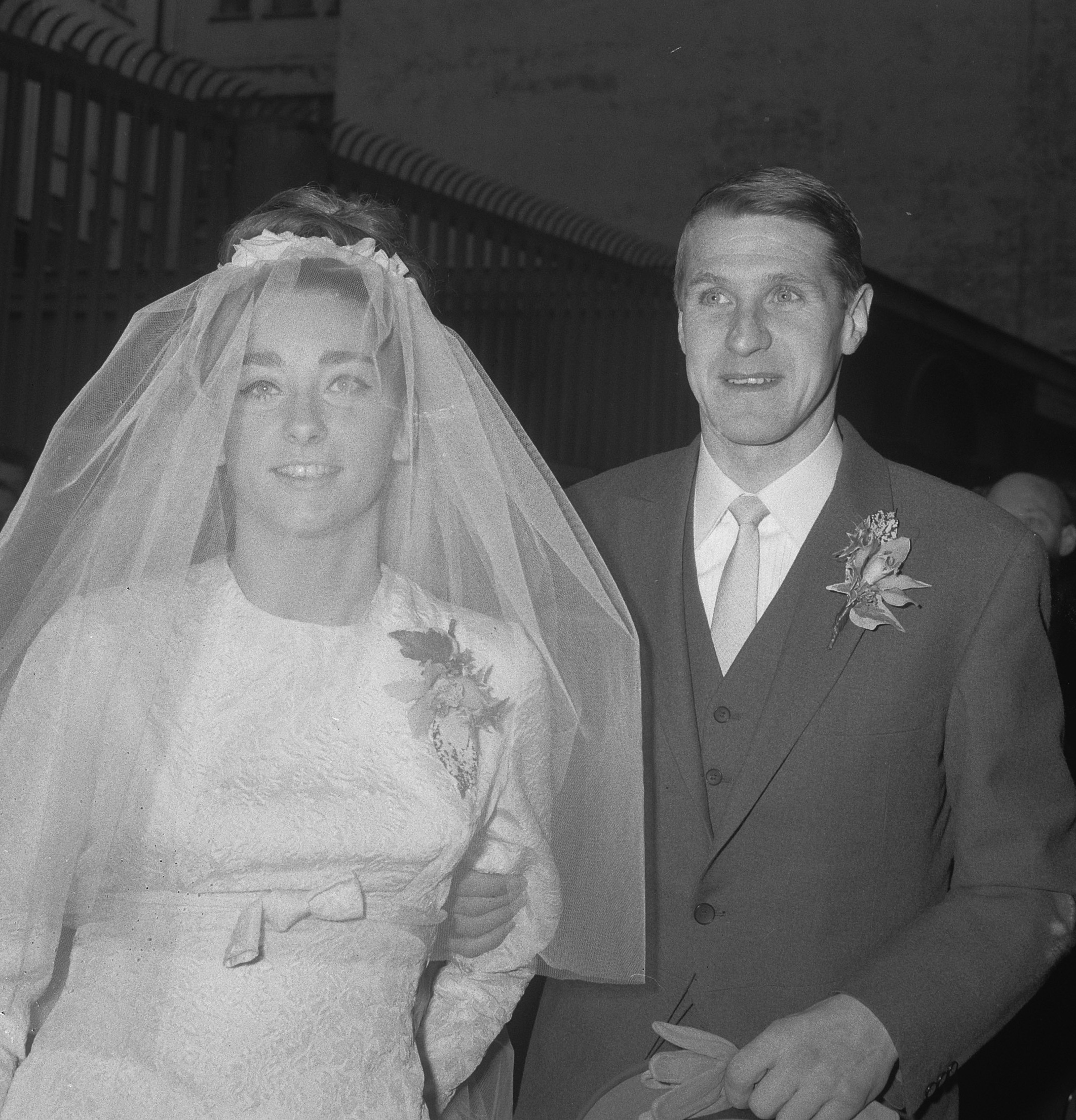
Peter Post and Loek Kalis are getting married on 1 February 1965

Post won the Dutch individual pursuit championships six times between 1957 and 1963. He took 14 European track titles (mostly madison and derny races). In 1965 in Antwerp he set the derny-paced hour record of 63.783 km, beating Stan Ockers' record which had stood for nine years.

== After retirement ==
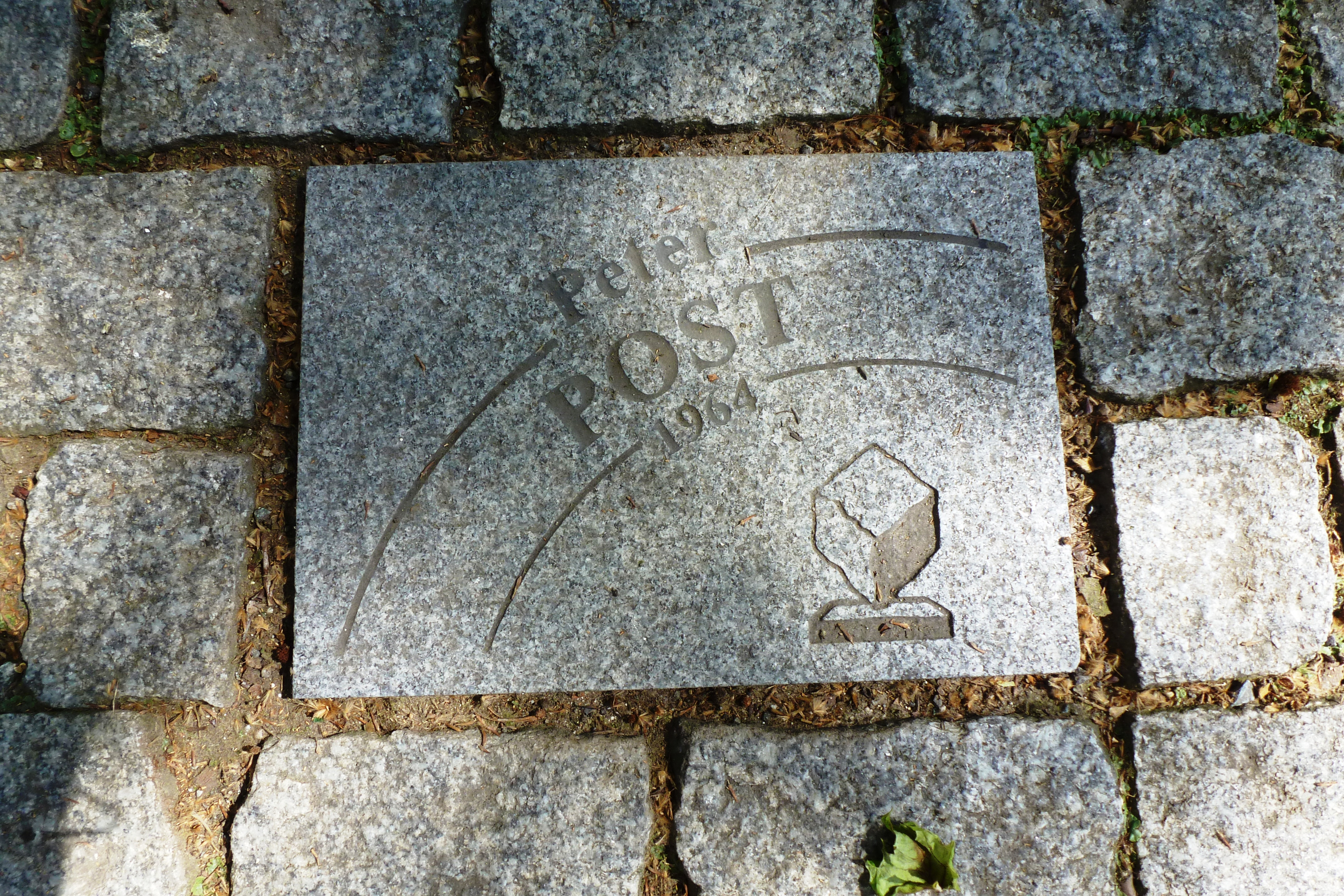
Stone dedicated to Post on Allée Charles Crupelandt in Roubaix

Post retired from riding in 1972 and became directeur sportif of the TI–Raleigh team in 1974. He was a former rider who knew the inside of cycling but also a shrewd businessman who could negotiate with sponsors. Post had a reputation of being hard on riders but his success with TI–Raleigh was exceptional. Post had riders such as Hennie Kuiper, Gerrie Knetemann, Jan Raas and Joop Zoetemelk (all Dutch), one of the best squads in the world for a decade. Most impressive was the 1980 edition of the Tour de France. The TI–Raleigh team won 11 stages and Joop Zoetemelk won overall.

In 1983 Raleigh pulled out of sponsorship and Post found a new backer in Panasonic. The success continued, this time with mainly non-Dutch riders such as Phil Anderson, Eric Vanderaerden, Viatcheslav Ekimov, Olaf Ludwig and Maurizio Fondriest. After the withdrawal of Panasonic, Post led the Histor and then Novemail teams before leaving cycling in 1995. As of September 2020, he is ranked as the seventh most successful director of all time by Cycling Ranking. Post returned to cycling as an adviser to the Rabobank team in 2005. He died on 14 January 2011.

== Six-day wins ==
Nr.	Year	Venue	Partner
1	1957	Chicago	Harm Smits
2	1959	Antwerp	Gerrit Schulte and Klaus Bugdahl
3	1959	Brussels	Gerrit Schulte
4	1959	Münster	Lucien Gillen
5	1960	Antwerp	Gerrit Schulte
6	1960	Berlin	Rik Van Looy
7	1960	Ghent	Rik Van Looy
8	1961	Cologne	Rik Van Looy
9	1961	Antwerp	Rik Van Looy and Willy Vannitsen
10	1961	Brussels	Rik Van Looy
11	1961	Ghent	Rik Van Looy
12	1962-1	Berlin	Rik Van Looy
13	1962	Antwerp	Rik Van Looy
14	1962	Dortmund	Rik Van Looy
15	1963	Cologne	Fritz Pfenninger
16	1963	Milan	Ferdinando Terruzzi
17	1963	Brussels	Fritz Pfenninger
18	1963	Zürich	Fritz Pfenninger
19	1964	Cologne	Hans Junkermann
20	1964	Antwerp	Fritz Pfenninger and Noël Foré
21	1964-2	Berlin	Fritz Pfenninger
22	1964	Brussels	Fritz Pfenninger
23	1964	Zürich	Fritz Pfenninger
24	1965-1	Berlin	Fritz Pfenninger
25	1965	Essen	Rik Van Steenbergen
26	1965	Antwerp	Klaus Bugdahl and Jan Janssen
27	1965	Dortmund	Fritz Pfenninger
28	1965	Brussels	Tom Simpson
29	1965	Zürich	Fritz Pfenninger
30	1966	Essen	Fritz Pfenninger
31	1966	Milan	Gianni Motta
32	1966	Antwerp	Fritz Pfenninger and Jan Janssen
33	1966	Ghent	Fritz Pfenninger
34	1966	Amsterdam	Fritz Pfenninger
35	1967	Bremen	Fritz Pfenninger

Nr.	Year	Venue	Partner
36	1967	Essen	Fritz Pfenninger
37	1967	Antwerp	Fritz Pfenninger and Jan Janssen
38	1967	Milan	Gianni Motta
39	1967-2	Berlin	Klaus Bugdahl
40	1967	Frankfurt	Fritz Pfenninger
41	1968	Milan	Gianni Motta
42	1968	Rotterdam	Patrick Sercu
43	1968	London	Patrick Sercu
44	1968-2	Berlin	Wolfgang Schulze
45	1968	Ghent	Leo Duyndam
46	1969	Bremen	Patrick Sercu
47	1969	Antwerp	Patrick Sercu and Rik Van Looy
48	1969	Rotterdam	Romain Deloof
49	1969	London	Patrick Sercu
50	1969	Dortmund	Patrick Sercu
51	1969	Frankfurt	Patrick Sercu
52	1969	Amsterdam	Romain Deloof
53	1970	Cologne	Patrick Sercu
54	1970	Bremen	Patrick Sercu
55	1970	Antwerp	René Pijnen and Klaus Bugdahl
56	1970	Groningen	Jan Janssen
57	1970	London	Patrick Sercu
58	1970	Brussels	Jack Mourioux
59	1970	Zürich	Fritz Pfenninger and Erich Spahn
60	1971	Rotterdam	Patrick Sercu
61	1971-1	Grenoble	Alain van Lancker
62	1971	Antwerp	René Pijnen and Leo Duyndam
63	1971	London	Patrick Sercu
64	1971	Berlin	Patrick Sercu
65	1971	Frankfurt	Patrick Sercu

== See also ==
- List of doping cases in cycling

== Bibliography ==
- Cycling Heroes, Les Woodland, Springfield Books, ISBN 1-85688-042-7
- A Century of Paris–Roubaix, Pascal Sergent, Bromley Books, ISBN 0-9531729-0-2

Awards
Preceded by Henk Nijdam	Dutch Sportsman of the Year; 1963	Succeeded by Anton Geesink
