= Evan Klamer =

Danish cyclist

Personal information
- Born: 15 January 1923 Copenhagen, Denmark
- Died: 28 April 1978 (aged 55) Lyngby-Taarbæk, Denmark

Cycling career
- Sport: Cycling

Evan Klamer (15 January 1923 – 28 April 1978) was a Danish cyclist. He competed in the tandem event at the 1948 Summer Olympics.
