= Reginald Arnold =

Personal information
- Full name: Reginald Athelstane Arnold
- Nationality: Australian
- Born: 9 October 1924 Murwillumbah, New South Wales, Australia
- Died: 23 July 2017 (aged 92) Nerang, Queensland, Australia

Sport
- Sport: Track cycling
- Updated on 25 July 2017

Reginald Athelstane Arnold OAM (9 October 1924 – 23 July 2017) was an Australian professional racing cyclist and one of Australia's most successful post-war riders. Despite losing sight in his right eye following a childhood accident, Reginald Arnold established an interntional cycling career spanning Europe, Northern America and Australia between 1946 and 1963.

Reginald Arnold's cycling career began in 1941, when his brothers gave him a bicycle for his birthday. He joined Ashfield cycling club in Sydney where he made a name for himself as a capable track sprinter, winning several state titles.

After World War II, Arnold competed on the European circuit, specialising in six-day racing. He completed in 103 six-day events worldwide and won 16 races, including the prestigious 1955 Paris Six-Day. In 1952 and 1957, he was a member of the teams that won the European madison championships, a title widely regarded at the time as the de facto profressional world championship. He specialised in six-day racing and was also a five time winner of the Antwerp Six-Day and won the Gent Six-Day and Berlin Six-Day races on multiple occasions.

In 2000, Arnold was awarded the Australian Sports Medal (ASM) for his contribution to cycling and being part of the world number one team for day cycle races for a number of years. In the 2012 Queen's Birthday Honours, he was awarded the Medal of the Order of Australia for services to cycling.

Arnold died on 23 July 2017, aged 92, in Nerang, Queensland.

== Early life and family ==
Reginald Arnold was born at Byrill Creek in northern NSW Australia, the fourth child of Eldred Alfred Athelstane Arnold (1888-1929)and Beatrice Wotherspoon.

His father Eldred Alfred Athelstane Arnold (1888-1929) was born in Queensland. In 1912, Eldred obtained a farming block close to Kunghur, through a land ballot. He later established a dairy farm at Byrrill Creek, where he and his wife Beatrice Wotherspoon, operated a 350 acre property with dairy cows and traded cattle. Beatrice Wotherspoon came from a prominent northern NSW family. Her father served as Mayor of Lismore and her grandfather Andrew Wotherspoon, was a poet (and strong advocate for convict children's education) among the earliest school teachers in Canberra district.

In 1929, while travelling to visit his wife, who had been hospitalised in Murwillumbah before the birth of their sixth child, Eldred Arnold became seriously unwell while crossing Byrrill Creek by boat during flood conditions. Despite attempts to obtain help by the man who accomanied him, he died shortly after from reported heart failure. Following his death Beatrice gave birth to a son, whom she named Eldred in his father's memory.

The death of Eldred Arnold placed significant responsibility on the eldest son Robert (Rob) who was twelve years old at the time and helped to manage the family farm. Shortly after his fathers death, Reginald suffered a serious eye injury when a piece of recoiling wire hit his eye which he found while splitting wood. The accident resulted in the loss of vision in his right eye.

Most of the Arnold children were sent to boarding school after the death of their father. Reginald found the transition difficult, having grown up in a rural Australian environment. During his time in school he briefly ran away with another student before being returned by police. Despit disciplinary difficulties in his early years, he later became school captain. Reginald developed a strong interest in boxing during his youth. When he was sixteen he becan work as a metalworker and was earning ten shillings per week. Together with his brothers, he contributed financially towards perchasing a house for their mother.

Fred and Lindsay enjoyed racing with the Ashfield Cycling club and engouraged Reginald to join, but at the time Reg was more interested in being a soccer player. Reginald eventually joined his brothers with bike riding and Lindsay put together a old hand me down bike together so Reg could ride to work with Fred. This introduction to cycling marked the beginning of Arnold's involvement in the sport, which would later bring him national and international recognition. His early years, shaped by family hardship, loss of sight in one eye and the responsibilities he assumed from a young age may have helped Reginald develop the determination and resilience.

== Early racing career ==
Reginald Arnold's mother was initially reluctant to allow him to race because he had lost the sign in one eye following the childhood accident. His brother Fred eventually convinced his mother to let him ride.

The brothers frequently visited the bicycle shop of the Sydney cycle manufacturer Don Blackman, who became an important supporter of their cylcing careers. Reginald Arnold and Lindsay Arnold competed successful in track carnivals at the Sydney Sports Arena and other amateur meetings in New South Wales Australia.

During the early 1940s, there was dissatisfaction among some cyclists with the administration the Australian Cyclists' Union (ACU), particularly the practice of "chopping", contributed to the establishment of the Australian Cycling Association (ACA) as a breakaway organisation. Chopping involved informal arragements between riders regarding race placings and price money and was viewed by critics as detrimental to genuine competition. Arnold joined the breakaway organisation which promoted mass-start racing and attracted a growing number of cyclists and clubs. Since the ACA was not affiliated with the Union Cycliste Interantionale (UCI), its riders faced difficulties obtaining permission to compete. Seeking opportunities overseas, Reginald Arnold arranged passage to Britain in 1946 aboard the Norwegian freighter Tyooka. He started work on the ship in the engine room as a greaser. Later the 1st engineer allowed him to instead work in washing cabins to help improve his seasickness. For training on the ship he rode the rollers on the ship. Before leaving Australia he became engaged to Margaret Ives and soon after left on the voyage took 52 days.

In Britain, Reginald Arnold joined fellow Australian Cyclist Alf Storm. The pair competed in races organised by the British League of Racing Cyclists (BLRC), which, like the ACA, operated outside the recognised cycling structure. Post war Britain remained subject to rationing and the two Australians lived frugally (they had one egg a week, a halfpenny lamp chop and the rest was salad) and they sold trophies as they won to help pay for food.

After about six months in England, Reginald Arnold and Alf Storm travelled to Belgium, which offered greater opportunities for professional cyclists. After arriving with limited financial resources, they came to the attention of former Belgian sprint champion Oscar Daemers. Daemers provided accommodation, equipment and financial support, agreeing to assist the Australians as they established themselves in European racing. Reginald and Alf's progress was initially hampered by their lack of UCI recognised racing licenses. Australian officials refused to grant the necessary clearances to riders associated with breakaway cycling organisations. Reginald and Alf Storm were required to pay fines and provide financial guarantees before permission was granted. Don Blackman and Fred Arnold assisted Reginald Arnold to pay these fees, while supporters in Belgium helped Alf Storm meet similar requirements.

Under Daemers' guidance, Reginald Arnold and Alf Storm trained extensively on both road and track around Ghent. They soon began to compete successfully in Belgian events, including races at the Kuipke velodrome. Their performances attracted attention with Belgian cycling circles and led to invitations to compete in higher profile meetings.

Reginald Arnold subsequently progressed to Madison and six day racing in Belgium and France, establishing the international career that would make him one of Australia's most successful professional cyclists of the postwar period.

== Selected palmarès ==
Six-Day Victories

| Year | Race | Partner(s) |
| 1949 | New York Six Day | Alf Strom |
| 1950 | Berlin Six Day | Alf Strom |
| 1950 | Berlin Six Day | Alf Strom |
| 1951 | Antwerp Six Day | Alf Strom |
| 1952 | Antwerp Six Day | Alf Strom |
| 1952 | London Six Day | Alf Strom |
| 1955 | Paris Six Day | Sid Paterson, Russell Mockridge |
| 1956 | Antwerp Six Day | Stan Ockers, Jean Roth |
| 1956 | Gent Six Day | Ferdinando Terruzzi |
| 1957 | Antwerp Six Day | Ferdinando Terruzzi, Willy Lauwers |
| 1957 | Dortmund Six Day | Ferdinando Terruzzi |
| 1958 | Antwerp Six Day | Rik Van Steenbergen, Emile Severeyns |
| 1958 | Gent Six Day | Rik Van Looy |
| 1959 | Zürich Six Day | Walter Bucher |
| 1961 | Essen Six Day | Ferdinando Terruzzi |
| 1961 | Milan Six Day | Ferdinando Terruzzi |

European Madison Championships

| Year | Result | Partner |
| 1949 | 3rd | Alf Strom |
| 1952 | 1st | Alf Strom |
| 1955 | 3rd | Sid Paterson |
| 1957 | 1st | Ferdinando Terruzzi |
| 1962 | 4th | Walter Bucher |
| 1962 | 3rd | Emile Severeyns |

== Recognition ==
- In 2025, he was inducted into the Cycling Australia Hall of Fame.
