= Walter Bucher (cyclist) =

Swiss cyclist (1926–2025)

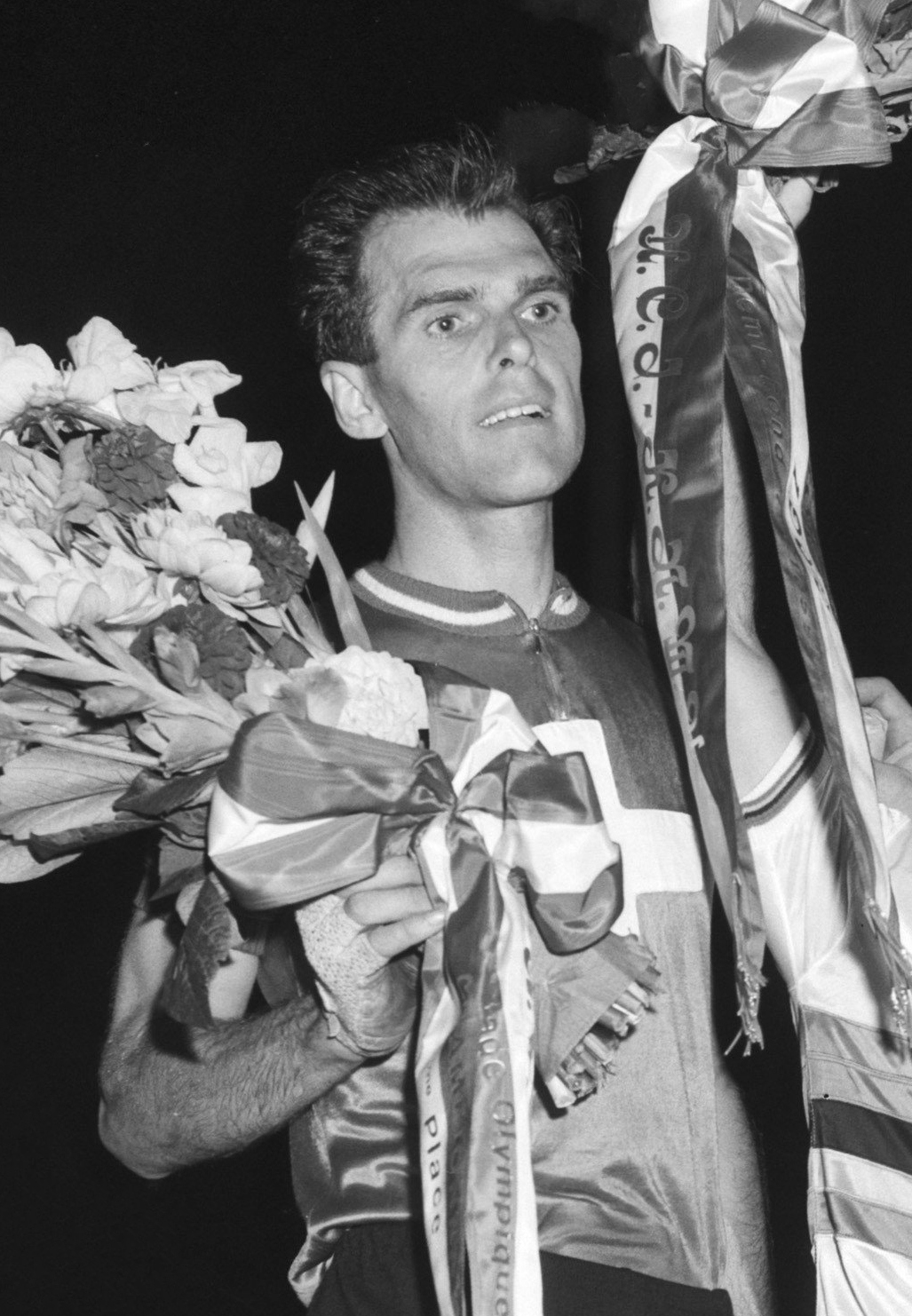
- Bucher at the 1959 World Championships

Personal information
- Born: 8 June 1926 Zurich, Switzerland
- Died: 6 March 2025 (aged 98) Zurich, Switzerland

Cycling career
- Sport: Cycling
Medal record
Representing Switzerland
Motor-paced World Championships
Silver medal – second place	1955 Milan	Professionals
Bronze medal – third place	1956 Copenhagen	Professionals
Silver medal – second place	1957 Rocourt	Professionals
Gold medal – first place	1958 Paris	Professionals
Silver medal – second place	1959 Amsterdam	Professionals

Walter Bucher (8 June 1926 – 6 March 2025) was a Swiss cyclist. He competed in the team pursuit event at the 1948 Summer Olympics. Between 1955 and 1959 he won a medal at every UCI Motor-paced World Championships, including a gold medal in 1958. He also won five national titles in motor-paced racing (1955, 1957–1960).

Bucher was also a successful road cyclist, winning 11 six-day races out of 66. He missed the 1961 UCI Track World Championships in his native Zurich due to a bad fall earlier that year. Next year he stopped cycling and founded a shipping company. He retired in 1992 due to an accident at work.

Bucher died in Zurich on 6 March 2025, at the age of 98.
