= Ferdinando Terruzzi =

Italian cyclist (1924–2014)

Ferdinando Teruzzi
Personal information
- Full name: Ferdinando Teruzzi
- Born: 17 February 1924 Sesto San Giovanni, Italy
- Died: 9 April 2014 (aged 90)

Cycling career
- Sport: Cycling
- Discipline: Track
- Role: Rider
- Rider type: Sprinter
Medal record
Men's track cycling
Representing Italy
Olympic Games
Gold medal – first place	1948 London	Tandem

Ferdinando Teruzzi (17 February 1924 – 9 April 2014) was an Italian racing cyclist and Olympic champion in track cycling. He won a gold medal in the tandem event (with Renato Perona) at the 1948 Summer Olympics in London.
