= Six Days of Bremen =

Cycling race

Race details
- Date: January
- Region: Bremen, Germany
- Discipline: Track
- Type: Six-day racing

History
- First edition: 1910
- Editions: 59 (as of 2025)
- First winner: Willy Arend (GER); Eugen Stabe (GER)
- Most wins: René Pijnen (NED) (7 wins)
- Most recent: Yoeri Havik (NED); Nils Politt (GER)

The Six Days of Bremen is a six-day track cycling race held annually in Bremen, Germany. The event was first held in 1910 as a one-off event and has been a regular event since 1965. It is held at the ÖVB Arena. The event was cancelled in 2021 and 2022 because of the COVID-19 pandemic, and was also not held in 2023. The event returned in January 2024.

== Winners ==
Year	Winners	Second	Third
1910	Willy Arend (GER); Eugen Stabe (GER)	Otto Pawke (GER); Carl Rudel (GER)	Anteo Carapezzi (ITA); Willy Techmer (GER)
1965	Rik Van Steenbergen (BEL); Palle Lykke (DEN)	Rolf Roggendorf (GER); Rudi Altig (GER)	Dieter Kemper (GER); Horst Oldenburg (GER)
1966	Dieter Kemper (GER); Rudi Altig (GER)	Fritz Pfenninger (SUI); Peter Post (NED)	Klaus Bugdahl (GER); Sigi Renz (GER)
1967	Peter Post (NED); Fritz Pfenninger (SUI)	Dieter Kemper (GER); Horst Oldenburg (GER)	Klaus Bugdahl (GER); Patrick Sercu (BEL)
1968	Sigi Renz (GER); Rudi Altig (GER)	Freddy Eugen (DEN); Palle Lykke (DEN)	Dieter Kemper (GER); Horst Oldenburg (GER)
1969	Peter Post (NED); Patrick Sercu (BEL)	Dieter Kemper (GER); Horst Oldenburg (GER)	Freddy Eugen (DEN); Palle Lykke (DEN)
1970	Peter Post (NED); Patrick Sercu (BEL)	Sigi Renz (GER); Wolfgang Schulze (GER)	Klaus Bugdahl (GER); Julien Stevens (BEL)
1971	Albert Fritz (GER); Rudi Altig (GER)	Peter Post (NED); Patrick Sercu (BEL)	Klaus Bugdahl (GER); Alain van Lancker (FRA)
1972	Sigi Renz (GER); Wolfgang Schulze (GER)	Peter Post (NED); Patrick Sercu (BEL)	Dieter Kemper (GER); Klaus Bugdahl (GER)
1973	Dieter Kemper (GER); Graeme Gilmore (AUS)	René Pijnen (NED); Leo Duyndam (NED)	Albert Fritz (GER); Wilfried Peffgen (GER)
1974	René Pijnen (NED); Leo Duyndam (NED)	Albert Fritz (GER); Wilfried Peffgen (GER)	Graeme Gilmore (AUS); Patrick Sercu (BEL)
1975	René Pijnen (NED); Patrick Sercu (BEL)	Albert Fritz (GER); Wilfried Peffgen (GER)	Udo Hempel (GER); Günter Haritz (GER)
1976	René Pijnen (NED); Günter Haritz (GER)	Dieter Kemper (GER); Sigi Renz (GER)	Patrick Sercu (BEL); Graeme Gilmore (AUS)
1977	Wilfried Peffgen (GER); Albert Fritz (GER)	Klaus Bugdahl (GER); Dietrich Thurau (GER)	René Pijnen (NED); Günter Haritz (GER)
1978	Wilfried Peffgen (GER); Albert Fritz (GER)	Jürgen Tschan (GER); Gregor Braun (GER)	Donald Allan (AUS); Danny Clark (AUS)
1979	René Pijnen (NED); Danny Clark (AUS)	Wilfried Peffgen (GER); Albert Fritz (GER)	Patrick Sercu (BEL); Dietrich Thurau (GER)
1980	Patrick Sercu (BEL); Albert Fritz (GER)	Wilfried Peffgen (GER); Gregor Braun (GER)	Roman Hermann (LIE); Horst Schütz (GER)
1981	René Pijnen (NED); Gregor Braun (GER)	Albert Fritz (GER); Patrick Sercu (BEL)	Donald Allan (AUS); Danny Clark (AUS)
1982	René Pijnen (NED); Albert Fritz (GER)	Gert Frank (DEN); Patrick Sercu (BEL)	Dietrich Thurau (GER); Gregor Braun (GER)
1983	René Pijnen (NED); Gregor Braun (GER)	Albert Fritz (GER); Patrick Sercu (BEL)	Gert Frank (DEN); Jan Raas (NED)
1984	Albert Fritz (GER); Dietrich Thurau (GER)	Gary Wiggins (AUS); Tony Doyle (GBR)	Gert Frank (DEN); Hans-Henrik Ørsted (DEN)
1985	Gary Wiggins (AUS); Tony Doyle (GBR)	Danny Clark (AUS); Dietrich Thurau (GER)	Josef Kristen (GER); Henry Rinklin (GER)
1986	Josef Kristen (GER); Dietrich Thurau (GER)	Gert Frank (DEN); René Pijnen (NED)	Roman Hermann (GER); Urs Freuler (SUI)
1987	Danny Clark (AUS); Dietrich Thurau (GER)	Josef Kristen (GER); Roman Hermann (GER)	Constant Tourné (BEL); Etienne De Wilde (BEL)
1988	Danny Clark (AUS); Tony Doyle (GBR)	Andreas Kappes (GER); Roman Hermann (GER)	Constant Tourné (BEL); Etienne De Wilde (BEL)
1989	Andreas Kappes (GER); Roman Hermann (GER)	Roger Ilegems (BEL); Roland Günther (GER)	Danny Clark (AUS); Urs Freuler (SUI)
1990	Danny Clark (AUS); Roland Günther (GER)	Andreas Kappes (GER); Etienne De Wilde (BEL)	Urs Freuler (SUI); Volker Diehl (GER)
1991	Andreas Kappes (GER); Etienne De Wilde (BEL)	Danny Clark (AUS); Urs Freuler (SUI)	Bruno Holenweger (GER); Volker Diehl (GER)
1992	Andreas Kappes (GER); Etienne De Wilde (BEL)	Bruno Holenweger (GER); Urs Freuler (SUI)	Danny Clark (AUS); Tony Doyle (GBR)
1993	Peter Pieters (NED); Urs Freuler (SUI)	Danny Clark (AUS); Remig Stumpf (GER)	Bruno Risi (SUI); Kurt Betschart (SUI)
1994	Andreas Kappes (GER); Danny Clark (AUS)	Bruno Risi (SUI); Kurt Betschart (SUI)	Urs Freuler (SUI); Carsten Wolf (GER)
1995	Bruno Risi (SUI); Kurt Betschart (SUI)	Adriano Baffi (ITA); Pierangelo Bincoletto (ITA)	Andreas Kappes (GER); Etienne De Wilde (BEL)
1996	Marco Villa (ITA); Silvio Martinello (ITA)	Bruno Risi (SUI); Kurt Betschart (SUI)	Jimmi Madsen (DEN); Jens Veggerby (DEN)
1997	Andreas Kappes (GER); Carsten Wolf (GER)	Marco Villa (ITA); Silvio Martinello (ITA)	Bruno Risi (SUI); Kurt Betschart (SUI)
1998	Jimmi Madsen (DEN); Jens Veggerby (DEN)	Andreas Kappes (GER); Adriano Baffi (ITA)	Bruno Risi (SUI); Kurt Betschart (SUI)
1999	Bruno Risi (SUI); Kurt Betschart (SUI)	Andreas Kappes (GER); Etienne De Wilde (BEL)	Marco Villa (ITA); Adriano Baffi (ITA)
2000	Andreas Kappes (GER); Silvio Martinello (ITA)	Marco Villa (ITA); Adriano Baffi (ITA)	Jimmi Madsen (DEN); Scott McGrory (AUS)
2001	Matthew Gilmore (BEL); Scott McGrory (AUS)	Rolf Aldag (GER); Silvio Martinello (ITA)	Andreas Beikirch (GER); Andreas Kappes (GER)
2002	Bruno Risi (SUI); Kurt Betschart (SUI)	Matthew Gilmore (BEL); Scott McGrory (AUS)	Marco Villa (ITA); Silvio Martinello (ITA)
2003	Danny Stam (NED); Robert Slippens (NED)	Andreas Beikirch (GER); Andreas Kappes (GER)	Matthew Gilmore (BEL); Scott McGrory (AUS)
2004	Bruno Risi (SUI); Kurt Betschart (SUI)	Danny Stam (NED); Robert Slippens (NED)	Andreas Beikirch (GER); Andreas Kappes (GER)
2005	Andreas Beikirch (GER); Robert Bartko (GER)	Bruno Risi (SUI); Kurt Betschart (SUI)	Marco Villa (ITA); Iljo Keisse (BEL)
2006	Danny Stam (NED); Robert Slippens (NED)	Marco Villa (ITA); Erik Zabel (GER)	Robert Bartko (GER); Andreas Beikirch (GER)
2007	Bruno Risi (SUI); Erik Zabel (GER)	Guido Fulst (GER); Leif Lampater (GER)	Robert Bartko (GER); Iljo Keisse (BEL)
2008	Iljo Keisse (BEL); Robert Bartko (GER)	Erik Zabel (GER); Leif Lampater (GER)	Bruno Risi (SUI); Franco Marvulli (SUI)
2009	Erik Zabel (GER); Leif Lampater (GER)	Olaf Pollack (GER); Franco Marvulli (SUI)	Bruno Risi (SUI); Danny Stam (NED)
2010	Bruno Risi (SUI); Franco Marvulli (SUI)	Robert Bartko (GER); Iljo Keisse (BEL)	Leif Lampater (GER); Christian Grasmann (GER)
2011	Robert Bengsch (GER); Robert Bartko (GER)	Alexander Äschbach (SUI); Franco Marvulli (SUI)	Jens-Erik Madsen (DEN); Marc Hester (DEN)
2012	Peter Schep (NED); Robert Bartko (GER)	Marcel Kalz (GER); Franco Marvulli (SUI)	Leif Lampater (GER); Iljo Keisse (BEL)
2013	Franco Marvulli (SUI); Marcel Kalz (GER)	Leif Lampater (GER); Luke Roberts (AUS)	Robert Bartko (GER); Peter Schep (NED)
2014	Leif Lampater (GER); Wim Stroetinga (NED)	Marcel Kalz (GER); Robert Bartko (GER)	Andreas Müller (AUT); Marc Hester (DEN)
2015	Marcel Kalz (GER); Alex Rasmussen (DEN)	Morgan Kneisky (FRA); Jesper Mørkøv (DEN)	Leif Lampater (GER); Wim Stroetinga (NED)
2016	Kenny De Ketele (BEL); Christian Grassmann (GER)	Morgan Kneisky (FRA); Jesper Mørkøv (DEN)	Alex Rasmussen (DEN); Marcel Kalz (GER)
2017	Marcel Kalz (GER); Iljo Keisse (BEL)	Leif Lampater (GER); Wim Stroetinga (NED)	Jesper Mørkøv (DEN); Yoeri Havik (NED)
2018	Kenny De Ketele (BEL); Theo Reinhardt (GER)	Achim Burkart (GER); Yoeri Havik (NED)	Christian Grasmann (GER); Jesper Mørkøv (DEN)
2019	Iljo Keisse (BEL); Jasper De Buyst (NED)	Mark Hester (DEN); Theo Reinhardt (GER)	Simone Consonni (ITA); Tristan Marguet (SUI)
2020	Kenny De Ketele (BEL); Nils Politt (GER)	Theo Reinhardt (GER); Morgan Kneisky (FRA)	Andreas Graf (AUT); Mark Hester (DEN)
2021-2023	No race		
2024	(Germany) Roger Kluge (Germany) Theo Reinhardt	(Netherlands) Yoeri Havik (Netherlands) Jan-Willem van Schip	(Germany) Nils Politt (Belgium) Lindsay De Vylder
2025	(Netherlands) Yoeri Havik (Germany) Nils Politt	(Germany) Roger Kluge (Germany) Theo Reinhardt	(Italy) Simone Consonni (Italy) Elia Viviani
