= Six Days of Milan =

Cycling race

Race details
- Region: Milan, Italy
- Local name(s): 6 Giorni di Milano
- Discipline: Track
- Type: Six-day racing

History
- First edition: 1927
- Editions: 29
- Final edition: 2008
- First winner: Costante Girardengo (ITA); Alfredo Binda (ITA)
- Most wins: Francesco Moser (ITA) (6 wins)
- Final winner: Paolo Bettini (ITA); Joan Llaneras (ESP)

The Six Days of Milan (Italian: Sei Giorni di Milano) was a six-day track cycling race held in Milan, Italy from 1927 until 2008.

== Winners ==
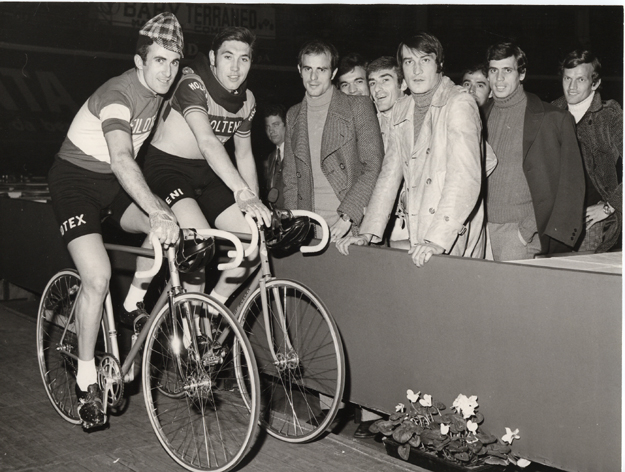
Franco Bitossi and Eddy Merckx during the 1971 Six Days of Milan

| Year | Winner | Second | Third |
|---|---|---|---|
| 1927 | (Italy) Costante Girardengo (Italy) Alfredo Binda | (Italy) Domenico Piemontesi (Netherlands) Piet van Kempen | (Italy) Pietro Bestetti (Italy) Alfredo Dinale |
| 1928 | (Italy) Costante Girardengo (Italy) Pietro Linari | (France) Onésime Boucheron (Italy) Alessandro Tonani | (France) Lucien Choury (France) Louis Fabre |
| 1929-1960 | No race |
| 1961 | (Italy) Ferdinando Terruzzi (Australia) Reginald Arnold | (Netherlands) Peter Post (Belgium) Rik Van Looy | (Switzerland) Walter Bucher (Switzerland) Fritz Pfenninger |
| 1962 | (Belgium) Rik Van Steenbergen (Belgium) Emile Severeyns | (Australia) Reginald Arnold (Italy) Ferdinando Terruzzi | (Netherlands) Peter Post (Belgium) Rik Van Looy |
| 1963 | (Netherlands) Peter Post (Italy) Ferdinando Terruzzi | (West Germany) Klaus Bugdahl (Switzerland) Fritz Pfenninger | (Belgium) Rik Van Steenbergen (Belgium) Emile Severeyns |
| 1964 | (Belgium) Rik Van Steenbergen (Italy) Leandro Faggin | (Netherlands) Peter Post (Italy) Ferdinando Terruzzi | (Denmark) Palle Lykke Jensen (Switzerland) Fritz Pfenninger |
| 1965 | (Belgium) Rik Van Steenbergen (Italy) Gianni Motta | (Netherlands) Peter Post (Italy) Ferdinando Terruzzi | (West Germany) Dieter Kemper (West Germany) Horst Oldenburg |
| 1966 | (Netherlands) Peter Post (Italy) Gianni Motta | (Denmark) Freddy Eugen (Denmark) Palle Lykke Jensen | (Italy) Leandro Faggin (Belgium) Patrick Sercu |
| 1967 | (Netherlands) Peter Post (Italy) Gianni Motta | (West Germany) Klaus Bugdahl (Belgium) Patrick Sercu | (Italy) Leandro Faggin (West Germany) Sigi Renz |
| 1968 | (Netherlands) Peter Post (Italy) Gianni Motta | (West Germany) Rudi Altig (Italy) Felice Gimondi | (West Germany) Dieter Kemper (West Germany) Horst Oldenburg |
| 1969 | (West Germany) Dieter Kemper (West Germany) Horst Oldenburg | (Belgium) Eddy Merckx (Belgium) Patrick Sercu | (Italy) Michele Dancelli (Netherlands) Peter Post |
| 1970 | (West Germany) Dieter Kemper (Belgium) Norbert Seeuws | (West Germany) Klaus Bugdahl (West Germany) Sigi Renz | (Belgium) Romain Deloof (Switzerland) Fritz Pfenninger |
| 1971 | (Belgium) Eddy Merckx (Belgium) Julien Stevens | (Italy) Gianni Motta (Netherlands) Peter Post | (Switzerland) Erich Spahn (Switzerland) Fritz Pfenninger |
| 1972 | (Italy) Felice Gimondi (West Germany) Sigi Renz | (Italy) Gianni Motta (Belgium) Patrick Sercu | (Italy) Carlo Rancati (France) Alain Van Lancker |
| 1973 | (Belgium) Patrick Sercu (Belgium) Julien Stevens | (Italy) Gianni Motta (France) Alain Van Lancker | (Italy) Felice Gimondi (West Germany) Sigi Renz |
| 1974–1975 | No race |
| 1976 | (Italy) Francesco Moser (Belgium) Patrick Sercu | (Italy) Felice Gimondi (Belgium) Rik Van Linden | (West Germany) Albert Fritz (West Germany) Wolfgang Schulze |
| 1977 | (Italy) Felice Gimondi (Belgium) Rik Van Linden | (Belgium) Freddy Maertens (Belgium) Marc Demeyer | (Italy) Francesco Moser (Netherlands) René Pijnen |
| 1978 | (Italy) Francesco Moser (Netherlands) René Pijnen | (Italy) Giuseppe Saronni (Belgium) Patrick Sercu | (Australia) Donald Allan (Italy) Felice Gimondi |
| 1979 | (Italy) Francesco Moser (Netherlands) René Pijnen | (West Germany) Albert Fritz (West Germany) Wilfried Peffgen | (Belgium) Patrick Sercu (Italy) Felice Gimondi |
| 1980 | (Italy) Giuseppe Saronni (Belgium) Patrick Sercu | (West Germany) Albert Fritz (Netherlands) René Pijnen | (Belgium) Roger De Vlaeminck (Belgium) Alfons De Wolf |
| 1981 | (Italy) Francesco Moser (Belgium) Patrick Sercu | (West Germany) Albert Fritz (Netherlands) René Pijnen | (Australia) Donald Allan (Australia) Danny Clark |
| 1982 | (Italy) Giuseppe Saronni (Netherlands) René Pijnen | (Italy) Francesco Moser (Belgium) Patrick Sercu | (Italy) Maurizio Bidinost (Switzerland) Urs Freuler |
| 1983 | (Italy) Francesco Moser (Netherlands) René Pijnen | (Italy) Moreno Argentin (Belgium) Patrick Sercu | (Italy) Maurizio Bidinost (Switzerland) Urs Freuler |
| 1984 | (Italy) Francesco Moser (Netherlands) René Pijnen | (Italy) Guido Bontempi (West Germany) Dietrich Thurau | (Liechtenstein) Roman Hermann (West Germany) Horst Schütz |
| 1985–1995 | No race |
| 1996 | (Italy) Silvio Martinello (Italy) Marco Villa | (Switzerland) Kurt Betschart (Switzerland) Bruno Risi | (Italy) Pierangelo Bincoletto (Italy) Giovanni Lombardi |
| 1997 | (Italy) Silvio Martinello (Italy) Marco Villa | (Switzerland) Kurt Betschart (Switzerland) Bruno Risi | (Italy) Adriano Baffi (Italy) Gianni Bugno |
| 1998 | (Italy) Silvio Martinello (Belgium) Etienne De Wilde | (Italy) Adriano Baffi (Germany) Andreas Kappes | (Australia) Matthew Gilmore (Italy) Marco Villa |
| 1999 | (Italy) Silvio Martinello (Italy) Marco Villa | (Italy) Adriano Baffi (Germany) Andreas Kappes | (Italy) Andrea Collinelli (Denmark) Jimmi Madsen |
| 2000–2007 | No race |
| 2008 | (Italy) Paolo Bettini (Spain) Joan Llaneras | (Italy) Filippo Pozzato (Australia) Luke Roberts | (Argentina) Sebastián Donadio (Argentina) Walter Pérez |
