= Six Days of Cologne =

Cycling race

Race details
- Region: Cologne, Germany
- Discipline: Track
- Type: Six-day racing

History
- First edition: 1928
- Editions: 46 (as of 1998)
- Final edition: 1998
- First winner: Viktor Rausch (GER); Gottfried Hürtgen (GER)
- Most wins: Albert Fritz (GER) (6 wins)
- Final winner: Andreas Kappes (GER); Adriano Baffi (ITA)

The Six Days of Cologne was a six-day track cycling race held annually in Cologne, Germany.

== Winners ==
Year	Winner	Second	Third
1928	(Germany) Viktor Rausch (Germany) Gottfried Hürtgen	(Germany) Paul Buschenhagen (Germany) Theo Frankenstein	(Belgium) Alfons Goossens (Belgium) Henri Stockelynck
1929	(Belgium) Roger De Neef (Belgium) Pierre Goossens	(Germany) Karl Göbel (Germany) Gottfried Hürtgen	(France) Adolphe Charlier (Belgium) Henri Duray
1930	(Germany) Viktor Rausch (Germany) Gottfried Hürtgen	(Netherlands) Jan van Kempen (Netherlands) Piet van Kempen	(Germany) Georg Kroschel (Germany) Willy Rieger
1931	(Germany) Karl Göbel (Germany) Adolf Schön	(Germany) Werner Miethe (Germany) Gottfried Hürtgen	(Germany) Oskar Tietz (Germany) Willy Rieger
1932	(France) Paul Broccardo (Switzerland) Emil Richli	(Germany) Viktor Rausch (Germany) Gottfried Hürtgen	(Netherlands) Jan Pijnenburg (Netherlands) Piet van Kempen
1933	(Germany) Karl Göbel (Germany) Adolf Schön	(Netherlands) Jan Pijnenburg (Netherlands) Cor Wals	(France) Adolphe Charlier (Germany) Werner Ippen
1934-58	No race		
1959	(Germany) Klaus Bugdahl (Germany) Valentin Petry	(Germany) Hans Junkermann (Italy) Ferdinando Terruzzi	(Belgium) Rik Van Steenbergen (Germany) Heinz Vopel
1960	(Germany) Klaus Bugdahl (Germany) Hans Junkermann	(Belgium) Rik Van Steenbergen (Germany) Günther Ziegler	(Netherlands) Gerrit Schulte (Germany) Willi Franssen
1961	(Netherlands) Peter Post (Belgium) Rik Van Looy	(Belgium) Rik Van Steenbergen (Belgium) Emiel Severeyns	(Germany) Klaus Bugdahl (Germany) Rolf Roggendorf
1962	(Belgium) Rik Van Steenbergen (Belgium) Emiel Severeyns	(Denmark) Palle Lykke Jensen (Germany) Rolf Roggendorf	(Switzerland) Oskar Plattner (Germany) Hans Junkermann
1963	(Netherlands) Peter Post (Switzerland) Fritz Pfenninger	(Germany) Rudi Altig (Germany) Hans Junkermann	(Denmark) Palle Lykke Jensen (Belgium) Rik Van Steenbergen
1964	(Netherlands) Peter Post (Germany) Hans Junkermann	(Denmark) Palle Lykke Jensen (Belgium) Rik Van Steenbergen	(Germany) Klaus Bugdahl (Germany) Sigi Renz
1965	(Germany) Rudi Altig (Germany) Sigi Renz	(Netherlands) Peter Post (Switzerland) Fritz Pfenninger	(Denmark) Palle Lykke Jensen (Denmark) Freddy Eugen
1966	(Germany) Rudi Altig (Germany) Dieter Kemper	(Netherlands) Peter Post (Belgium) Rik Van Steenbergen	(Germany) Klaus Bugdahl (Germany) Wolfgang Schulze
1967	(Germany) Klaus Bugdahl (Belgium) Patrick Sercu	(Germany) Rudi Altig (Germany) Sigi Renz	(Netherlands) Peter Post (Switzerland) Fritz Pfenninger
1968	(Germany) Rudi Altig (Germany) Sigi Renz	(Belgium) Eddy Merckx (Belgium) Patrick Sercu	(Germany) Horst Oldenburg (Germany) Dieter Kemper
1969	(Germany) Horst Oldenburg (Germany) Dieter Kemper	(Netherlands) Peter Post (Belgium) Patrick Sercu	(Germany) Rudi Altig (Germany) Sigi Renz
1970	(Netherlands) Peter Post (Belgium) Patrick Sercu	(Germany) Klaus Bugdahl (Germany) Dieter Kemper	(Germany) Rudi Altig (Belgium) Eddy Merckx
1971	(Germany) Rudi Altig (Germany) Albert Fritz	(Germany) Wilfried Peffgen (Germany) Wolfgang Schulze	(Germany) Klaus Bugdahl (France) Alain Van Lancker
1972	(Germany) Sigi Renz (Germany) Wolfgang Schulze	(Germany) Wilfried Peffgen (Germany) Albert Fritz	(Netherlands) Leo Duyndam (Netherlands) René Pijnen
1973	(Belgium) Patrick Sercu (France) Alain Van Lancker	(Germany) Wilfried Peffgen (Germany) Albert Fritz	(Germany) Sigi Renz (Germany) Wolfgang Schulze
1974	(Australia) Graeme Gilmore (Germany) Dieter Kemper	(Germany) Wilfried Peffgen (Belgium) Patrick Sercu	(Netherlands) Leo Duyndam (Germany) Udo Hempel
1975	(Germany) Wilfried Peffgen (Germany) Albert Fritz	(Germany) Jürgen Tschan (France) Alain Van Lancker	(Germany) Sigi Renz (Germany) Wolfgang Schulze
1976	(Germany) Wilfried Peffgen (Germany) Dieter Kemper	(Germany) Günther Haritz (Netherlands) René Pijnen	(Germany) Klaus Bugdahl (Germany) Udo Hempel
1977	(Germany) Günther Haritz (Netherlands) René Pijnen	(Germany) Wilfried Peffgen (Germany) Albert Fritz	(Germany) Jürgen Tschan (Germany) Wolfgang Schulze
1978	(Germany) Wilfried Peffgen (Germany) Albert Fritz	(Germany) Jürgen Tschan (Germany) Gregor Braun	(Germany) Günther Haritz (Netherlands) René Pijnen
1979	(Belgium) Patrick Sercu (Germany) Gregor Braun	(Germany) Wilfried Peffgen (Germany) Albert Fritz	(Germany) Horst Schütz (Netherlands) René Pijnen
1980	(Australia) Danny Clark (Netherlands) René Pijnen	(Germany) Wilfried Peffgen (Germany) Gregor Braun	(Belgium) Patrick Sercu (Germany) Albert Fritz
1981	(Belgium) Patrick Sercu (Germany) Albert Fritz	(Australia) Danny Clark (Germany) Wilfried Peffgen	(Australia) Donald Allan (Denmark) Gert Frank
1982	(Germany) Wilfried Peffgen (Germany) Albert Fritz	(Belgium) Patrick Sercu (Germany) Gregor Braun	(Germany) Josef Kristen (Netherlands) René Pijnen
1983	(Germany) Dietrich Thurau (Germany) Albert Fritz	(Denmark) Gert Frank (Germany) Wilfried Peffgen	(Germany) Gregor Braun (Netherlands) René Pijnen
1984	(Germany) Josef Kristen (Netherlands) René Pijnen	(Germany) Horst Schütz (Switzerland) Robert Dill-Bundi	(Germany) Dietrich Thurau (Germany) Albert Fritz
1985	(Germany) Dietrich Thurau (Australia) Danny Clark	(Germany) Josef Kristen (Netherlands) Henri Rinklin	(Germany) Horst Schütz (Denmark) Gert Frank
1986	(Liechtenstein) Roman Hermann (Liechtenstein) Sigmund Hermann	(Belgium) Etienne De Wilde (Belgium) Stan Tourné	(United Kingdom) Anthony Doyle (Australia) Danny Clark
1987	(Germany) Dietrich Thurau (Netherlands) René Pijnen	(Liechtenstein) Roman Hermann (Germany) Josef Kristen	(Belgium) Etienne De Wilde (Belgium) Stan Tourné
1988	(Belgium) Etienne De Wilde (Belgium) Stan Tourné	(United Kingdom) Anthony Doyle (Denmark) Hans-Henrik Ørsted	(Liechtenstein) Roman Hermann (Germany) Andreas Kappes
1989	(United Kingdom) Anthony Doyle (Australia) Danny Clark	(Liechtenstein) Roman Hermann (Germany) Andreas Kappes	(Belgium) Etienne De Wilde (Belgium) Stan Tourné
1990	(Belgium) Etienne De Wilde (Germany) Andreas Kappes	(Germany) Volker Diehl (Belgium) Stan Tourné	(Germany) Remig Stumpf (Denmark) Jens Veggerby
1991	(Belgium) Etienne De Wilde (Germany) Andreas Kappes	(Italy) Pierangelo Bincoletto (Switzerland) Bruno Holenweger	(Denmark) Jens Veggerby (Belgium) Stan Tourné
1992	(Germany) Remig Stumpf (Switzerland) Bruno Holenweger	(Belgium) Etienne De Wilde (Germany) Andreas Kappes	(Germany) Jochen Görgen (Denmark) Jens Veggerby
1993	(Germany) Remig Stumpf (Switzerland) Urs Freuler	(Germany) Jochen Görgen (Denmark) Jens Veggerby	(Italy) Pierangelo Bincoletto (Germany) Roland Günther
1994	(Germany) Carsten Wolf (Switzerland) Urs Freuler	(Belgium) Etienne De Wilde (Germany) Andreas Kappes	(Switzerland) Kurt Betschart (Switzerland) Bruno Risi
1995	(Switzerland) Kurt Betschart (Switzerland) Bruno Risi	(Australia) Dean Woods (Denmark) Jimmi Madsen	(Belgium) Etienne De Wilde (Germany) Andreas Kappes
1996	(Belgium) Etienne De Wilde (Germany) Andreas Kappes	(Denmark) Jens Veggerby (Denmark) Jimmi Madsen	(Australia) Dean Woods (Australia) Danny Clark
1997	(Belgium) Etienne De Wilde (Germany) Olaf Ludwig	(Denmark) Jens Veggerby (Denmark) Jimmi Madsen	(Switzerland) Andreas Kappes (Switzerland) Bruno Risi
1998	(Switzerland) Andreas Kappes (Italy) Adriano Baffi	(Italy) Silvio Martinello (Italy) Marco Villa	(Denmark) Jens Veggerby (Denmark) Jimmi Madsen
