= Six Days of Dortmund =

Cycling race

- Poster to the 1989 edition

Race details
- Date: Dortmund, Germany
- Discipline: Track
- Type: Six-day racing

History
- First edition: 1926
- Final edition: 2008
- First winner: Fritz Knappe (GER); Willy Rieger (GER)
- Final winner: Leif Lampater (GER); Erik Zabel (GER)

The Six Days of Dortmund is a six-day track cycling race held annually in Dortmund, Germany. The event was first held in 1926 and the final edition in 2008.

== Palmares ==
Year	Winners	Second	Third
1926	Fritz Knappe (GER); Willy Rieger (GER)	Emil Lewanow (GER); Erich Möller (GER)	Marcel Buysse (BEL); Aloïs Degraeve (BEL)
1927	Willy Lorenz (GER); Alessandro Tonani (ITA)	Paul Kroll (GER); Werner Miethe (GER)	Pierre Rielens (BEL); Emile Thollembeeck (BEL)
1928	Maurice Dewolf (BEL); Piet van Kempen (NED)	Gottfried Hürtgen (GER); Viktor Rausch (GER)	Alfredo Binda (ITA); Pietro Linari (ITA)
1929	Alfredo Dinale (ITA); Karl Göbel (GER)	Gottfried Hürtgen (GER); Viktor Rausch (GER)	Jules Van Hevel (BEL); René Vermandel (BEL)
1930	Gottfried Hürtgen (GER); Viktor Rausch (GER)	Alfredo Dinale (ITA); Karl Göbel (GER)	Georg Kroschel (GER); Otto Petri (GER)
1931	Jan Pijnenburg (NED); Adolf Schön (GER)	Alfredo Dinale (ITA); Karl Göbel (GER)	Paul Broccardo (FRA); Gabriel Marcillac (FRA)
1932	Piet van Kempen (NED); Jan Pijnenburg (NED)	Gottfried Hürtgen (GER); Viktor Rausch (GER)	Adolphe Charlier (FRA); Roger De Neef (BEL)
1933	Paul Buschenhagen (GER); Adolf Schön (GER)	Karl Göbel (GER); Jan Pijnenburg (NED)	Paul Broccardo (FRA); Marcel Guimbretière (FRA)
1934	Paul Broccardo (FRA); Marcel Guimbretière (FRA)	Werner Ippen (GER); Adolf Schön (GER)	Alfredo Dinale (ITA); Walter Lohmann (GER)
1935–51	Not raced		
1952 (1)	Emile Carrara (FRA); Guy Lapébie (FRA)	Severino Rigoni (ITA); Ferdinando Terruzzi (ITA)	Erich Bautz (FRG); Hans Preiskeit (FRG)
1952 (2)	Hugo Koblet (SUI); Armin von Büren (SUI)	Emile Carrara (FRA); Heinz Müller (FRG)	Gustav Kilian (FRG); Rik Van Steenbergen (BEL)
1953	Lucien Gillen (LUX); Ferdinando Terruzzi (ITA)	Hugo Koblet (SUI); Armin von Büren (SUI)	Gerrit Peters (NED); Gerrit Schulte (NED)
1954	Lucien Acou (BEL); Achiel Bruneel (BEL)	Lucien Gillen (LUX); Ferdinando Terruzzi (ITA)	Walter Bucher (SUI); Jean Roth (SUI)
1955	Hugo Koblet (SUI); Armin von Büren (SUI)	Evan Klamer (DEN); Kay Werner Nielsen (DEN)	Horst Holzmann (FRG); Théo Intra (FRG)
1956	Emiel Severeyns (BEL); Rik Van Steenbergen (BEL)	Horst Holzmann (FRG); Gerrit Schulte (NED)	Reginald Arnold (AUS); Ferdinando Terruzzi (ITA)
1957	Reginald Arnold (AUS); Ferdinando Terruzzi (ITA)	Emiel Severeyns (BEL); Rik Van Steenbergen (BEL)	Hans Junkermann (FRG); Emil Reinecke (FRG)
1958	Palle Lykke (DEN); Kay Werner Nielsen (DEN)	Reginald Arnold (AUS); Horst Holzmann (FRG)	Fritz Pfenninger (SUI); Jean Roth (SUI)
1959	Klaus Bugdahl (FRG); Rik Van Steenbergen (BEL)	Hans Junkermann (FRG); Ferdinando Terruzzi (ITA)	Palle Lykke (DEN); Kay Werner Nielsen (DEN)
1960	Klaus Bugdahl (FRG); Hans Junkermann (FRG)	Palle Lykke (DEN); Kay Werner Nielsen (DEN)	Reginald Arnold (AUS); Sidney Patterson (AUS)
1961	Emiel Severeyns (BEL); Rik Van Steenbergen (BEL)	Klaus Bugdahl (FRG); Fritz Pfenninger (SUI)	Lucien Gillen (LUX); Peter Post (NED)
1962	Peter Post (NED); Rik Van Looy (BEL)	Rudi Altig (FRG); Hans Junkermann (FRG)	Klaus Bugdahl (FRG); Fritz Pfenninger (SUI)
1963	Klaus Bugdahl (FRG); Sigi Renz (FRG)	Fritz Pfenninger (SUI); Peter Post (NED)	Palle Lykke (DEN); Rik Van Steenbergen (BEL)
1964	Rudi Altig (FRG); Fritz Pfenninger (SUI)	Dieter Kemper (FRG); Horst Oldenburg (FRG)	Palle Lykke (DEN); Sigi Renz (FRG)
1965	Fritz Pfenninger (SUI); Peter Post (NED)	Rudi Altig (FRG); Dieter Kemper (FRG)	Freddy Eugen (DEN); Palle Lykke (DEN)
1966	Rudi Altig (FRG); Sigi Renz (FRG)	Dieter Kemper (FRG); Horst Oldenburg (FRG)	Fritz Pfenninger (SUI); Peter Post (NED)
1967	Dieter Kemper (FRG); Horst Oldenburg (FRG)	Klaus Bugdahl (FRG); Patrick Sercu (BEL)	Fritz Pfenninger (SUI); Peter Post (NED)
1968	Rudi Altig (FRG); Patrick Sercu (BEL)	Dieter Kemper (FRG); Horst Oldenburg (FRG)	Leo Duyndam (NED); Peter Post (NED)
1969	Peter Post (NED); Patrick Sercu (BEL)	Klaus Bugdahl (FRG); Dieter Kemper (FRG)	Rudi Altig (FRG); Sigi Renz (FRG)
1970	Rudi Altig (FRG); Albert Fritz (FRG)	René Pijnen (NED); Peter Post (NED)	Wilfried Peffgen (FRG); Wolfgang Schulze (FRG)
1971	Klaus Bugdahl (FRG); Dieter Kemper (FRG)	Rudi Altig (FRG); Albert Fritz (FRG)	Peter Post (NED); Patrick Sercu (BEL)
1972	Patrick Sercu (BEL); Alain Van Lancker (FRA)	Dieter Kemper (FRG); Wolfgang Schulze (FRG)	Leo Duyndam (NED); René Pijnen (NED)
1973	Eddy Merckx (BEL); Patrick Sercu (BEL)	Graeme Gilmore (AUS); Dieter Kemper (FRG)	Sigi Renz (FRG); Wolfgang Schulze (FRG)
1974	René Pijnen (NED); Patrick Sercu (BEL)	Günther Haritz (FRG); Udo Hempel (FRG)	Klaus Bugdahl (FRG); Wolfgang Schulze (FRG)
1975	Graeme Gilmore (AUS); Dieter Kemper (FRG)	Eddy Merckx (BEL); Patrick Sercu (BEL)	Günther Haritz (FRG); René Pijnen (NED)
1976	Freddy Maertens (BEL); Patrick Sercu (BEL)	Günther Haritz (FRG); Dietrich Thurau (FRG)	Dieter Kemper (FRG); René Pijnen (NED)
1977	Dietrich Thurau (FRG); Jürgen Tschan (FRG)	Francesco Moser (ITA); René Pijnen (NED)	Wilfried Peffgen (FRG); Patrick Sercu (BEL)
1978	Francesco Moser (ITA); René Pijnen (NED)	Gregor Braun (FRG); Wilfried Peffgen (FRG)	Patrick Sercu (BEL); Dietrich Thurau (FRG)
1979	Patrick Sercu (BEL); Dietrich Thurau (FRG)	Danny Clark (AUS); Horst Schütz (FRG)	Albert Fritz (FRG); Wilfried Peffgen (FRG)
1980	Gregor Braun (FRG); Patrick Sercu (BEL)	Donald Allan (AUS); Danny Clark (AUS)	Gert Frank (DEN); Albert Fritz (FRG)
1981	Gert Frank (DEN); Hans-Henrik Ørsted (DEN)	Donald Allan (AUS); Danny Clark (AUS)	Wilfried Peffgen (FRG); Horst Schütz (FRG)
1982	Danny Clark (AUS); Henry Rinklin (FRG)	Robert Dill-Bundi (SUI); Urs Freuler (SUI)	Wilfried Peffgen (FRG); Horst Schütz (FRG)
1983	Danny Clark (AUS); Tony Doyle (GBR)	Gert Frank (DEN); Hans-Henrik Ørsted (DEN)	Horst Schütz (FRG); Dietrich Thurau (FRG)
1984	Francesco Moser (ITA); René Pijnen (NED)	Gert Frank (DEN); Hans-Henrik Ørsted (DEN)	Danny Clark (AUS); Horst Schütz (FRG)
1985	Roman Hermann (LIE); Josef Kristen (FRG)	Etienne De Wilde (BEL); Stan Tourné (BEL)	Tony Doyle (GBR); Stephen Roche (IRL)
1986	Danny Clark (AUS); Tony Doyle (GBR)	Stefan Joho (SUI); Jörg Müller (SUI)	Roman Hermann (LIE); Josef Kristen (FRG)
1987	Danny Clark (AUS); Roman Hermann (LIE)	Pierangelo Bincoletto (ITA); Volker Diehl (FRG)	Tony Doyle (GBR); Roland Günther (FRG)
1988	Danny Clark (AUS); Tony Doyle (GBR)	Volker Diehl (FRG); Roland Günther (FRG)	Roman Hermann (LIE); Andreas Kappes (FRG)
1989	Andreas Kappes (FRG); Etienne De Wilde (BEL)	Tony Doyle (GBR); Torsten Rellensmann (FRG)	Danny Clark (AUS); Volker Diehl (FRG)
1990	Urs Freuler (SUI); Olaf Ludwig (GER)	Danny Clark (AUS); Andreas Kappes (GER)	Konstantin Chrabzov (CIS); Marat Ganeyev (CIS)
1991	Rolf Aldag (GER); Danny Clark (AUS)	Andreas Kappes (GER); Olaf Ludwig (GER)	Joechen Görgen (GER); Peter Pieters (NED)
1992	Kurt Betschart (SUI); Bruno Risi (SUI)	Olaf Ludwig (GER); Peter Pieters (NED)	Rolf Aldag (GER); Danny Clark (AUS)
1993	Kurt Betschart (SUI); Bruno Risi (SUI)	Etienne De Wilde (BEL); Erik Zabel (GER)	Adriano Baffi (ITA); Giovanni Lombardi (ITA)
1994	Adriano Baffi (ITA); Giovanni Lombardi (ITA)	Kurt Betschart (SUI); Bruno Risi (SUI)	Rolf Aldag (GER); Danny Clark (AUS)
1995	Rolf Aldag (GER); Danny Clark (AUS)	Kurt Betschart (SUI); Bruno Risi (SUI)	Etienne De Wilde (BEL); Erik Zabel (GER)
1996	Rolf Aldag (GER); Erik Zabel (GER)	Silvio Martinello (ITA); Marco Villa (ITA)	Kurt Betschart (SUI); Bruno Risi (SUI)
1997	Kurt Betschart (SUI); Bruno Risi (SUI)	Rolf Aldag (GER); Silvio Martinello (ITA)	Jimmi Madsen (DEN); Jens Veggerby (DEN)
1998	Rolf Aldag (GER); Silvio Martinello (ITA)	Kurt Betschart (SUI); Bruno Risi (SUI)	Jimmi Madsen (DEN); Scott McGrory (AUS)
1999	Kurt Betschart (SUI); Bruno Risi (SUI)	Rolf Aldag (GER); Silvio Martinello (ITA)	Andreas Beikirch (GER); Jimmi Madsen (DEN)
2000	Rolf Aldag (GER); Erik Zabel (GER)	Robert Bartko (GER); Silvio Martinello (ITA)	Kurt Betschart (SUI); Bruno Risi (SUI)
2001	Rolf Aldag (GER); Erik Zabel (GER)	Kurt Betschart (SUI); Bruno Risi (SUI)	Andreas Beikirch (GER); Andreas Kappes (GER)
2002	Andreas Beikirch (GER); Andreas Kappes (GER)	Rolf Aldag (GER); Silvio Martinello (ITA)	Kurt Betschart (SUI); Bruno Risi (SUI)
2003	Kurt Betschart (SUI); Bruno Risi (SUI)	Andreas Beikirch (GER); Andreas Kappes (GER)	Rolf Aldag (GER); Scott McGrory (AUS)
2004	Rolf Aldag (GER); Scott McGrory (AUS)	Matthew Gilmore (BEL); Bruno Risi (SUI)	Andreas Beikirch (GER); Andreas Kappes (GER)
2005	Rolf Aldag (GER); Erik Zabel (GER)	Kurt Betschart (SUI); Bruno Risi (SUI)	Robert Bartko (GER); Andreas Beikirch (GER)
2006	Bruno Risi (SUI); Erik Zabel (GER)	Guido Fulst (GER); Leif Lampater (GER)	Andreas Beikirch (GER); Danny Stam (NED)
2007	Bruno Risi (SUI); Franco Marvulli (SUI)	Leif Lampater (GER); Erik Zabel (GER)	Robert Bartko (GER); Andreas Beikirch (GER)
2008	Leif Lampater (GER); Erik Zabel (GER)	Robert Bartko (GER); Andreas Beikirch (GER)	Michael Mørkøv (DEN); Alex Rasmussen (DEN)
