= UEC European Track Championships – Men's madison =

Elite level championships

European Champion Jersey

The European Champion Jersey, from 2016

The Men's madison is one of the disciplines of the annual UEC European Track Championships.

It was first competed as a separate event in 1895.

European championships Madison events were later held as European Criterion or Winter Championship (1949–1971).

From 1972 to 1990, they were organized by the FICP as European Championship.

Since 1995 the UEC is responsible for all European championships.

The Madison became part of the newly established senior UEC European Track Championship event in 2010 in Poland.

It presently consists of a race distance of 50 km (200 laps), where the pairs can gain points through sprints or by being one lap ahead.

== Medalists ==
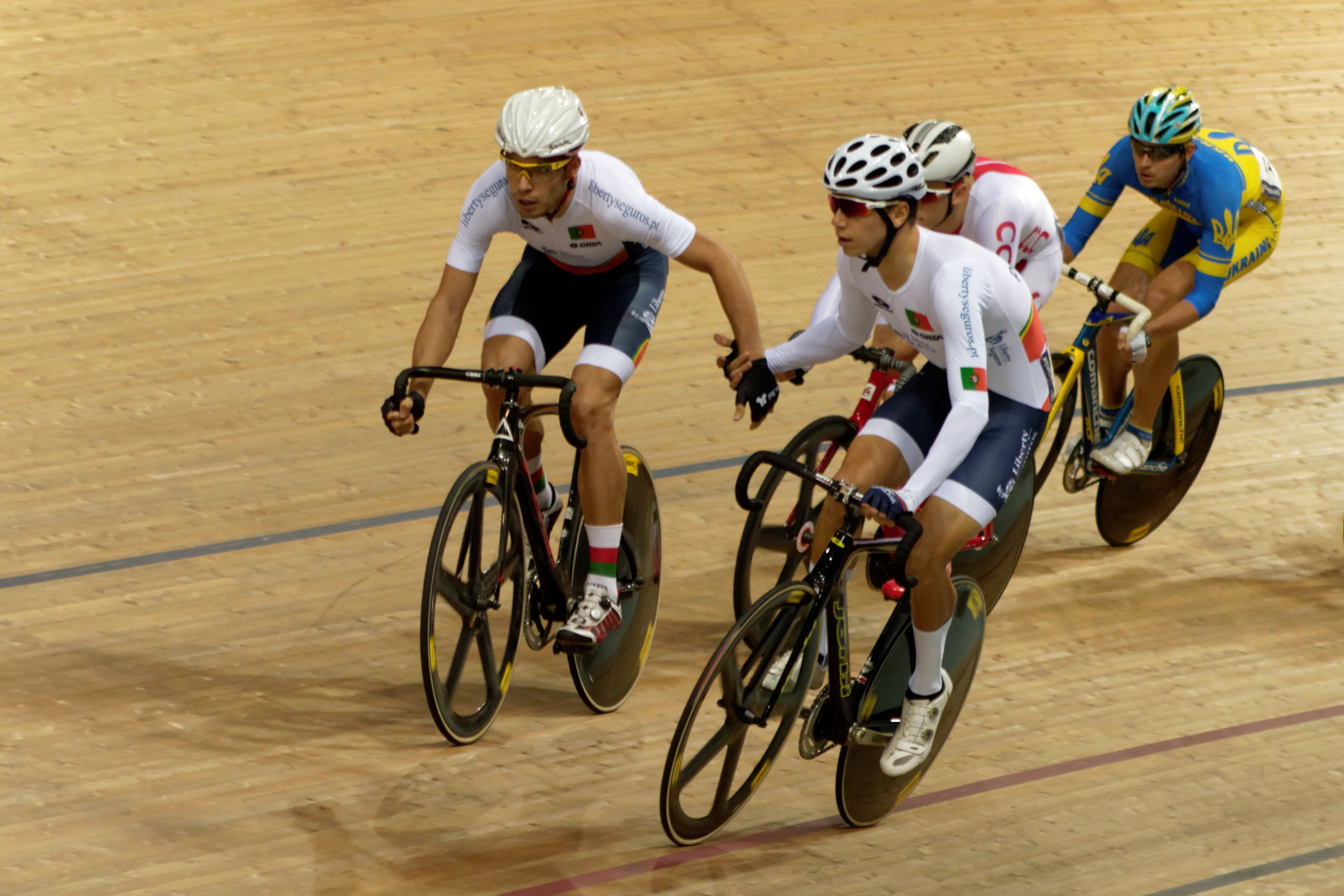
2016 UEC European Track Championships – Men's Madison in France

Championship	Gold	Silver	Bronze
European Criterion or Winter Championship
1949 Brussels	(Netherlands) Gerrit Boeijen (Netherlands) Gerrit Schulte	(Belgium) Achiel Bruneel (Belgium) Camiel Dekuysscher	(Australia) Reginald Arnold (Australia) Alfred Strom
1950 Zürich	(Netherlands) Gerrit Peters (Netherlands) Gerrit Schulte	(Belgium) Achiel Bruneel (France) Guy Lapébie	(Switzerland) Armin von Büren (Switzerland) Hugo Koblet
1951 Antwerp	(Belgium) Valère Ollivier (Belgium) Albert Sercu	(Netherlands) Gerrit Peters (Netherlands) Gerrit Schulte	(Belgium) Ernest Thyssen (Belgium) Albert Ramon
1952 Paris	(France) Jean Le Nizerhy (France) Roger Reynes	(Australia) Reginald Arnold (Australia) Alfred Strom	(France) Roger Godeau (France) Raymond Goussot
1953 Zürich	(Switzerland) Armin von Büren (Switzerland) Hugo Koblet	(Netherlands) Gerrit Peters (Netherlands) Gerrit Schulte	(Belgium) Achiel Bruneel (Belgium) Arsene Rijckaert
1954 Zürich	(Switzerland) Armin von Büren (Switzerland) Hugo Koblet	(Netherlands) Gerrit Peters (Netherlands) Gerrit Schulte	(Belgium) Achiel Bruneel (Belgium) Lucien Acou
1955 Paris	(France) Dominique Forlini (France) Georges Senfftleben	(Switzerland) Walter Bucher (Switzerland) Jean Roth	(Belgium) Joseph Debeuckelaer (Belgium) Arsene Rijckaert
1956 Dortmund	(Netherlands) Piet Haan (Netherlands) Jan Plantaz	(Netherlands) Gerrit Peters (Netherlands) Gerrit Schulte	(Australia) Reginald Arnold (Australia) Sid Patterson
1957 Kopenhagen	(Australia) Reginald Arnold (Italy) Ferdinando Terruzzi	(Belgium) Joseph Debeuckelaer (Belgium) Arsene Rijckaert	(Denmark) Evan Klamer (Denmark) Kay Werner Nielsen
1958 Kopenhagen	(Belgium) Rik Van Steenbergen (Belgium) Emile Severeyns	(France) Émile Carrara (France) Georges Senfftleben	(France) Dominique Forlini (France) Pierre Brun
1959 Zürich	(Belgium) Rik Van Steenbergen (Belgium) Emile Severeyns	(Denmark) Palle Lykke (Denmark) Kay Werner Nielsen	(Netherlands) Peter Post (Netherlands) Gerrit Schulte
1960 Antwerp	(Belgium) Rik Van Steenbergen (Belgium) Emile Severeyns	(Switzerland) Fritz Pfenninger (Switzerland) Jean Roth	(Luxembourg) Lucien Gillen (Switzerland) Oscar Plattner
1961 Köln	(Belgium) Rik Van Steenbergen (Belgium) Emile Severeyns	(Germany) Sigi Renz (Germany) Günther Ziegler	(Germany) Rudi Altig (Germany) Hans Junkermann
1962 Zürich	(Germany) Klaus Bugdahl (Switzerland) Fritz Pfenninger	(Belgium) Rik Van Looy (Netherlands) Peter Post	(Belgium) Rik Van Steenbergen (Belgium) Emile Severeyns
1963 Brussels	(Belgium) Rik Van Steenbergen (Denmark) Palle Lykke	(Belgium) Willy Vannitsen (Netherlands) Peter Post	(Belgium) Emile Severeyns (Australia) Reginald Arnold
1964 Zürich	(Netherlands) Peter Post (Switzerland) Fritz Pfenninger	(Germany) Klaus Bugdahl (Germany) Sigi Renz	(Luxembourg) Lucien Gillen (Switzerland) Peter Tiefenthaler
1965 Bremen	(Germany) Rudi Altig (Germany) Hans Junkermann	(Belgium) Rik Van Steenbergen (Belgium) Emile Severeyns	(Germany) Dieter Kemper (Germany) Horst Oldenburg
1966 Brussels	(Germany) Klaus Bugdahl (Germany) Sigi Renz	(Belgium) Rik Van Steenbergen (Denmark) Palle Lykke	(Switzerland) Fritz Pfenninger (Australia) Ron Baensch
1967 Gent	(Netherlands) Peter Post (Switzerland) Fritz Pfenninger	(Germany) Sigi Renz (Germany) Horst Oldenburg	(Belgium) Romain Deloof (Denmark) Freddy Eugen
1968 Bremen	(Germany) Dieter Kemper (Germany) Horst Oldenburg	(Denmark) Freddy Eugen (Germany) Rolf Roggendorf	(Belgium) Patrick Sercu (Germany) Klaus Bugdahl
1969 Gent	(Belgium) Patrick Sercu (Netherlands) Peter Post	(Germany) Dieter Kemper (Germany) Horst Oldenburg	(Germany) Klaus Bugdahl (Switzerland) Fritz Pfenninger
1970 Köln	(Belgium) Patrick Sercu (Belgium) Eddy Merckx	(Netherlands) Peter Post (Netherlands) Leo Duyndam	(Germany) Klaus Bugdahl (Germany) Dieter Kemper
1971 Gent	(Germany) Wilfried Peffgen (Germany) Sigi Renz	(Netherlands) Peter Post (Netherlands) René Pijnen	(Belgium) Patrick Sercu (Australia) Graeme Gilmore
FICP European Championship
1972 Antwerp	(Germany) Klaus Bugdahl (Germany) Dieter Kemper	(Belgium) Patrick Sercu (Belgium) Julien Stevens	(Germany) Wilfried Peffgen (Germany) Sigi Renz
1973 Antwerp	(Germany) Wilfried Peffgen (Germany) Albert Fritz	(Netherlands) Klaas Balk (Netherlands) René Pijnen	(Belgium) Rik Van Linden (Belgium) Julien Stevens
1974 Grenoble	(Netherlands) Leo Duyndam (Netherlands) René Pijnen	(France) Jacky Mourioux (France) Alain van Lancker	(Germany) Wilfried Peffgen (Germany) Albert Fritz
1975 Rotterdam	(Belgium) Patrick Sercu (Netherlands) René Pijnen	(Australia) Graeme Gilmore (Germany) Dieter Kemper	(Germany) Sigi Renz (Netherlands) Roy Schuiten
1976 Zürich	(Germany) Günter Haritz (Netherlands) René Pijnen	(Australia) Donald Allan (Australia) Danny Clark	(Belgium) Patrick Sercu (Germany) Klaus Bugdahl
1977 Kopenhagen	(Belgium) Patrick Sercu (Belgium) Eddy Merckx	(Denmark) Gert Frank (Netherlands) René Pijnen	(Germany) Wilfried Peffgen (Germany) Günter Haritz
1978 Milan	(Belgium) Patrick Sercu (Germany) Gregor Braun	(Australia) Danny Clark (Italy) Francesco Moser	(Switzerland) René Savary (Denmark) Kim Gunnar Svendsen
1979 Kopenhagen	(Australia) Danny Clark (Australia) Donald Allan	(Italy) Francesco Moser (Netherlands) René Pijnen	(Belgium) Patrick Sercu (Germany) Dietrich Thurau
1980 Gent	(Netherlands) René Pijnen (Belgium) Michel Vaarten	~~(Belgium) Patrick Sercu~~; ~~(Germany) Albert Fritz~~	~~(Germany) Heinz Betz~~; ~~(Germany) Günther Schumacher~~
1981 Kopenhagen	(Denmark) Hans-Henrik Ørsted (Denmark) Gert Frank	(Liechtenstein) Roman Hermann (West Germany) Horst Schütz	(West Germany) Albert Fritz (West Germany) Wilfried Peffgen
1982 Gent	(Belgium) Patrick Sercu (Netherlands) René Pijnen	(Denmark) Gert Frank (West Germany) Josef Kristen	(Italy) Maurizio Bidinost (Italy) Pierangelo Bincoletto
1983 Kopenhagen	(Denmark) Hans-Henrik Ørsted (Denmark) Gert Frank	(United Kingdom) Anthony Doyle (Australia) Gary Wiggins	(West Germany) Henry Rinklin (West Germany) Josef Kristen
1984 Zürich	(United Kingdom) Anthony Doyle (Australia) Gary Wiggins	(Liechtenstein) Roman Hermann (Liechtenstein) Sigmund Hermann	(West Germany) Henry Rinklin (West Germany) Josef Kristen
1985 Kopenhagen	(Netherlands) René Pijnen (Denmark) Gert Frank	(United Kingdom) Anthony Doyle (Australia) Gary Wiggins	(West Germany) Dietrich Thurau (West Germany) Josef Kristen
1986 Stuttgart	(Liechtenstein) Roman Hermann (West Germany) Josef Kristen	(Belgium) Etienne De Wilde (Belgium) Stan Tourné	(Netherlands) René Pijnen (Denmark) Gert Frank
1987 Zürich	(West Germany) Volker Diehl (West Germany) Roland Günther	(Switzerland) Urs Freuler (Switzerland) Hans Rudi Maerki	(Liechtenstein) Roman Hermann (Liechtenstein) Sigmund Hermann
1988 Kopenhagen	(Australia) Danny Clark (United Kingdom) Anthony Doyle	(West Germany) Volker Diehl (West Germany) Roland Günther	(Liechtenstein) Roman Hermann (Switzerland) Hans Rudi Maerki
1989 Gent	(Australia) Danny Clark (United Kingdom) Anthony Doyle	(Switzerland) Bruno Holenweger (Switzerland) Daniel Wyder	(France) Marc Meilleur (France) Philippe Tarantini
1990 Grenoble	(Italy) Pierangelo Bincoletto (Denmark) Jens Veggerby	(France) Laurent Biondi (France) Philippe Tarantini	(Germany) Roland Günther (Germany) Carsten Wolf
1991–1994	Not held		
UEC European Track Championship Madison (national teams)
1995 Manchester	Switzerland; Kurt Betschart; Bruno Risi	Italy; Pierangelo Bincoletto; Marco Villa	Belgium; Etienne De Wilde; Laurenzo Lapage
1996 Zürich	Denmark; Jimmi Madsen; Jens Veggerby	Switzerland; Kurt Betschart; Bruno Risi	Germany; Andreas Kappes; Carsten Wolf
1997 Dortmund	Denmark; Jimmi Madsen; Jens Veggerby	Switzerland; Kurt Betschart; Bruno Risi	Belgium; Etienne De Wilde; Frank Corvers
1998	Not held		
1999 Gent	France; Damien Pommereau; Robert Sassone	Austria; Andreas Müller; Bernhard Waechter	Czech Republic; Martin Bláha; Jacub Lazar
2000	Not held		
2001 Gent	Belgium; Matthew Gilmore; Etienne De Wilde	Italy; Silvio Martinello; Marco Villa	Switzerland; Kurt Betschart; Bruno Risi
2002 Amsterdam	Netherlands; Danny Stam; Robert Slippens	Switzerland; Kurt Betschart; Bruno Risi	Slovakia; Martin Liška; Jozef Žabka
2003 Amsterdam	Germany; Andreas Kappes; Andreas Beikirch	Netherlands; Danny Stam; Robert Slippens	Switzerland; Kurt Betschart; Bruno Risi
2004 Fiorenzuola	Switzerland; Alexander Äschbach; Franco Marvulli	Slovakia; Martin Liška; Jozef Žabka	Denmark; Jens-Erik Madsen; Michael Smith Larsen
2005 Dalmine	Belgium; Matthew Gilmore; Iljo Keisse	Czech Republic; Martin Bláha; Petr Lazar	Russia; Konstantin Ponomarev; Alexey Shmidt
2006 Ballerup	Switzerland; Bruno Risi; Franco Marvulli	Netherlands; Danny Stam; Peter Schep	Czech Republic; Alois Kaňkovský; Petr Lazar
2007 Alkmaar	Netherlands; Jens Mouris; Peter Schep	Russia; Alexei Markov; Nikolay Trusov	Russia; Ivan Kovalev; Alexey Shmidt
2008 Alkmaar	Belgium; Iljo Keisse; Kenny De Ketele	Denmark; Casper Jørgensen; Michael Mørkøv	Russia; Ivan Kovalev; Sergueï Kolesnikov
2009 Ghent	Germany; Roger Kluge; Robert Bartko	Russia; Alexey Shmidt; Sergueï Kolesnikov	Netherlands; Danny Stam; Peter Schep
UEC European Track Championships
2010 Pruszków	Czech Republic; Martin Bláha; Jiří Hochmann	Belgium; Kenny De Ketele; Tim Mertens	Ukraine; Mykhaylo Radionov; Sergiy Lagkuti
2011 Apeldoorn	Belgium; Kenny De Ketele; Iljo Keisse	Switzerland; Claudio Imhof; Cyrille Thièry	France; Vivien Brisse; Morgan Kneisky
2012 Panevėžys	Czech Republic; Martin Bláha; Jiří Hochmann	Russia; Artur Ershov; Valery Kaykov	Italy; Angelo Ciccone; Elia Viviani
2013 Apeldoorn	Italy; Liam Bertazzo; Elia Viviani	Spain; David Muntaner; Albert Torres	Belgium; Kenny De Ketele; Gijs Van Hoecke
2014 Guadeloupe	Austria; Andreas Graf; Andreas Müller	Belgium; Kenny De Ketele; Otto Vergaerde	France; Morgan Kneisky; Vivien Brisse
2015 Grenchen	Spain; Sebastián Mora; Albert Torres	Russia; Mikhail Radionov; Andrey Sazanov	France; Morgan Kneisky; Bryan Coquard
2016 Saint-Quentin-en-Yvelines	Spain; Sebastián Mora; Albert Torres	France; Morgan Kneisky; Bryan Coquard	Belgium; Kenny De Ketele; Moreno De Pauw
2017 Berlin	France; Florian Maitre; Benjamin Thomas	Denmark; Niklas Larsen; Casper Pedersen	Poland; Wojciech Pszczolarski; Daniel Staniszewski
2018 Glasgow	Belgium; Kenny De Ketele; Robbe Ghys	Germany; Roger Kluge; Theo Reinhardt	United Kingdom; Oliver Wood; Ethan Hayter
2019 Apeldoorn	Denmark; Lasse Norman Hansen; Michael Mørkøv	Netherlands; Yoeri Havik; Jan-Willem van Schip	Germany; Maximilian Beyer; Theo Reinhardt
2020 Plovdiv	Spain; Sebastián Mora; Albert Torres	Portugal; Ivo Oliveira; Rui Oliveira	Italy; Francesco Lamon; Stefano Moro
2021 Grenchen	Netherlands; Yoeri Havik; Jan-Willem van Schip	Belgium; Kenny De Ketele; Lindsay De Vylder	Portugal; Iúri Leitão; Rui Oliveira
2022 Munich	Germany; Roger Kluge; Theo Reinhardt	France; Thomas Boudat; Donavan Grondin	Belgium; Robbe Ghys; Fabio Van den Bossche
2023 Grenchen	Germany; Roger Kluge; Theo Reinhardt	Italy; Simone Consonni; Michele Scartezzini	France; Benjamin Thomas; Donavan Grondin
2024 Apeldoorn	Germany; Roger Kluge; Theo Reinhardt	France; Thomas Boudat; Donavan Grondin	Denmark; Michael Mørkøv; Theodor Storm
2025 Heusden-Zolder	Netherlands; Yanne Dorenbos; Vincent Hoppezak	Germany; Roger Kluge; Tim Torn Teutenberg	Portugal; Ivo Oliveira; Rui Oliveira
2026 Konya	Germany; Moritz Augenstein; Roger Kluge	Portugal; Iúri Leitão; Diogo Narciso	Belgium; Jasper De Buyst; Jules Hesters
