= Six Days of Rotterdam =

Dutch six-day track cycling race

- Poster to the second edition in 1937

Race details
- Date: Early January (since 1971)
- Region: Rotterdam, the Netherlands
- Discipline: Track
- Type: Six-day racing
- Web site: www.zesdaagserotterdam.nl

History
- First edition: 1936
- Editions: 41 (as of 2024)
- First winner: Jan Pijnenburg (NED); Cor Wals (NED)
- Most recent: Michael Mørkøv (DEN); Tobias Hansen (DEN)

The Six Days of Rotterdam is a six-day track cycling race held annually in Rotterdam, the Netherlands at the Rotterdam Ahoy. The event was first held in 1936.

== Winners ==
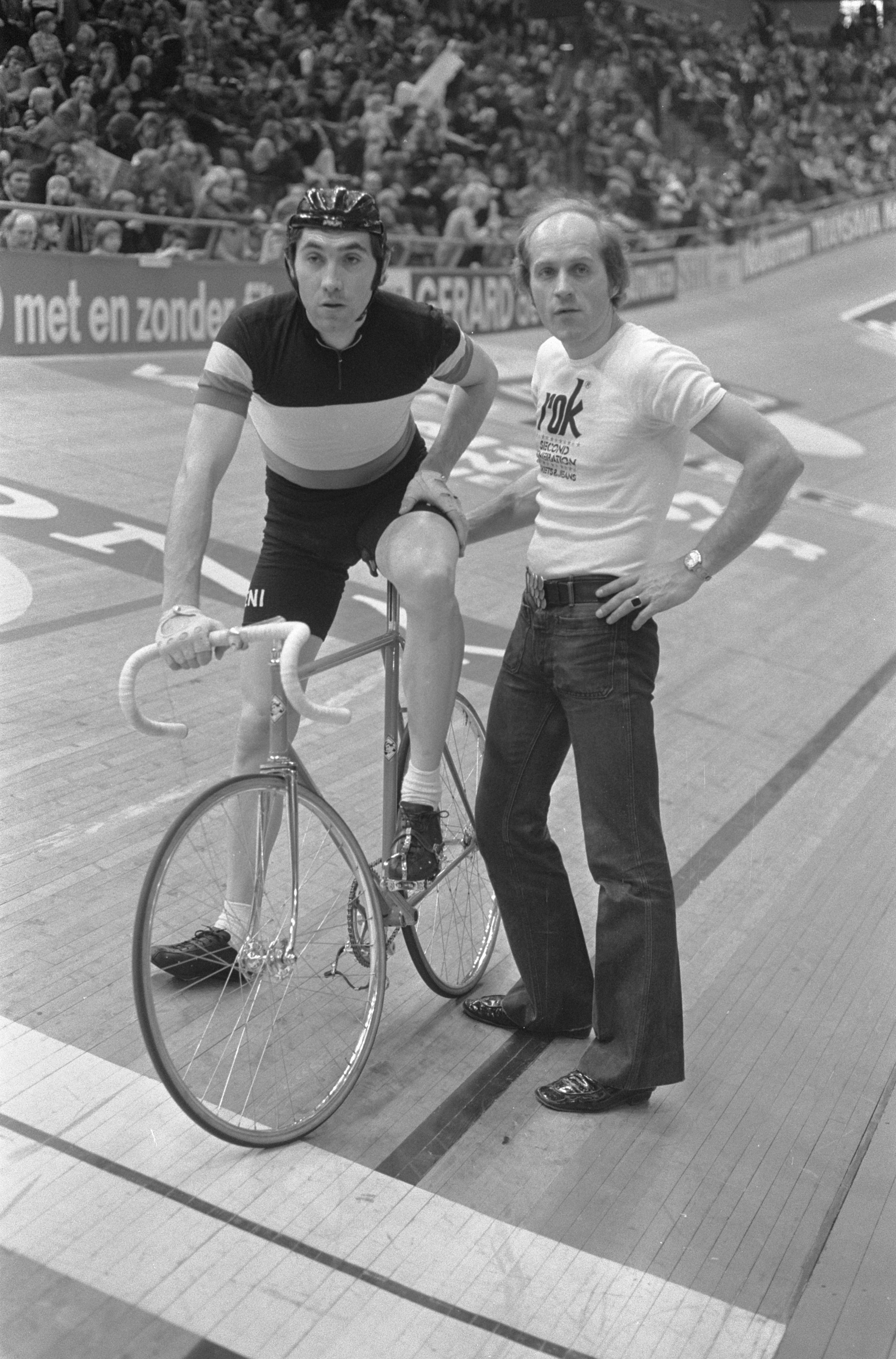
Eddy Merckx during the 1974 Six Days of Rotterdam

| Year | Winners | Second | Third |
|---|---|---|---|
| 1936 | Jan Pijnenburg (NED); Cor Wals (NED) | Adolphe Charlier (BEL); Frans Slaats (NED) | Kees Pellenaars (NED); Adolf Schön (GER) |
| 1937 | Albert Buysse (BEL); Albert Billiet (BEL) | Kees Pellenaars (NED); Adolf Schön (GER) | Louis van Schjindel (NED); Frans van den Broeck (NED) |
| 1938-67 | Not raced | | |
| 1968 | Peter Post (NED); Patrick Sercu (BEL) | Klaus Bugdahl (FRG); Leo Duyndam (NED) | Gerard Koel (NED); Sigi Renz (FRG) |
| 1969 | Romain Deloof (BEL); Peter Post (NED) | Klaus Bugdahl (FRG); Gerard Koel (NED) | Freddy Eugen (DEN); Graeme Gilmore (AUS) |
| 1970 | Not raced | | |
| 1971 | Peter Post (NED); Patrick Sercu (BEL) | Leo Duyndam (NED); René Pijnen (NED) | Sigi Renz (FRG); Theo Verschueren (BEL) |
| 1972 | Leo Duyndam (NED); René Pijnen (NED) | Klaus Bugdahl (FRG); Dieter Kemper (FRG) | Graeme Gilmore (AUS); Alain Van Lancker (FRA) |
| 1973 | Leo Duyndam (NED); René Pijnen (NED) | Eddy Merckx (BEL); Patrick Sercu (BEL) | Albert Fritz (FRG); Dieter Kemper (FRG) |
| 1974 | Leo Duyndam (NED); René Pijnen (NED) | Eddy Merckx (BEL); Patrick Sercu (BEL) | Jacky Mourioux (FRA); Alain Van Lancker (FRA) |
| 1975 | Leo Duyndam (NED); Gerben Karstens (NED) | René Pijnen (NED); Roy Schuiten (NED) | Patrick Sercu (BEL); Alain Van Lancker (FRA) |
| 1976 | Eddy Merckx (BEL); Patrick Sercu (BEL) | Günter Haritz (FRG); René Pijnen (NED) | Leo Duyndam (NED); Gerben Karstens (NED) |
| 1977 | Danny Clark (AUS); René Pijnen (NED) | Günter Haritz (FRG); Dietrich Thurau (FRG) | Freddy Maertens (BEL); Patrick Sercu (BEL) |
| 1978 | Danny Clark (AUS); René Pijnen (NED) | Albert Fritz (FRG); Wilfried Peffgen (FRG) | Gerben Karstens (NED); Roy Schuiten (NED) |
| 1979 | Albert Fritz (FRG); Patrick Sercu (BEL) | Gerrie Knetemann (NED); René Pijnen (NED) | Donald Allan (AUS); Danny Clark (AUS) |
| 1980 | René Pijnen (NED); Jan Raas (NED) | Donald Allan (AUS); Danny Clark (AUS) | Albert Fritz (FRG); Patrick Sercu (BEL) |
| 1981 | Donald Allan (AUS); Danny Clark (AUS) | René Pijnen (NED); Jan Raas (NED) | Albert Fritz (FRG); Patrick Sercu (BEL) |
| 1982 | René Pijnen (NED); Patrick Sercu (BEL) | Albert Fritz (FRG); Dietrich Thurau (FRG) | Donald Allan (AUS); Danny Clark (AUS) |
| 1983 | René Pijnen (NED); Patrick Sercu (BEL) | Gert Frank (DEN); Jan Raas (NED) | Donald Allan (AUS); Danny Clark (AUS) |
| 1984 | Urs Freuler (SUI); René Pijnen (NED) | Horst Schütz (FRG); Gary Wiggins (AUS) | Albert Fritz (FRG); Dietrich Thurau (FRG) |
| 1985 | Danny Clark (AUS); René Pijnen (NED) | Stan Tourné (BEL); Etienne De Wilde (BEL) | Roman Hermann (LIE); Gerrie Knetemann (NED) |
| 1986 | Danny Clark (AUS); Francesco Moser (ITA) | René Pijnen (NED); Eric Vanderaerden (BEL) | Bert Oosterbosch (NED); Dietrich Thurau (FRG) |
| 1987 | Pierangelo Bincoletto (ITA); Danny Clark (AUS) | Josef Kristen (FRG); Teun van Vliet (NED) | Roman Hermann (LIE); Peter Stevenhaagen (NED) |
| 1988 | Danny Clark (AUS); Tony Doyle (GBR) | Roman Hermann (LIE); Teun van Vliet (NED) | Stan Tourné (BEL); Etienne De Wilde (BEL) |
| 2005 | Robert Slippens (NED); Danny Stam (NED) | Bruno Risi (SUI); Kurt Betschart (SUI) | Jimmi Madsen (DEN); Jakob Piil (DEN) |
| 2006 | Robert Slippens (NED); Danny Stam (NED) | Matthew Gilmore (BEL); Iljo Keisse (BEL) | Robert Bartko (GER); Andreas Beikirch (GER) |
| 2007 | Robert Bartko (GER); Iljo Keisse (BEL) | Danny Stam (NED); Marco Villa (ITA) | Bruno Risi (SUI); Franco Marvulli (SUI) |
| 2008 | Danny Stam (NED); Leif Lampater (GER) | Bruno Risi (SUI); Franco Marvulli (SUI) | Iljo Keisse (BEL); Robert Bartko (GER) |
| 2009 | Peter Schep (NED); Juan Llaneras (ESP) | Bruno Risi (SUI); Danny Stam (NED) | Leif Lampater (GER); Franco Marvulli (SUI) |
| 2010 | Danny Stam (NED); Iljo Keisse (BEL) | Bruno Risi (SUI); Franco Marvulli (SUI) | Michael Mørkøv (DEN); Alex Rasmussen (DEN) |
| 2011 | Danny Stam (NED); Léon van Bon (NED) | Robert Bartko (GER); Pim Ligthart (NED) | Michael Mørkøv (DEN); Jens-Erik Madsen (DEN) |
| 2012 | Peter Schep (NED); Wim Stroetinga (NED) | Jens Mouris (NED); Franco Marvulli (SUI) | Yoeri Havik (NED); Danny Stam (NED) |
| 2013 | Iljo Keisse (BEL); Niki Terpstra (NED) | Peter Schep (NED); Wim Stroetinga (NED) | Yoeri Havik (NED); Nick Stöpler (NED) |
| 2014 | Niki Terpstra (NED); Iljo Keisse (BEL) | Kenny De Ketele (BEL); Jasper De Buyst (BEL) | Michael Mørkøv (DEN); Alex Rasmussen (DEN) |
| 2015 | Niki Terpstra (NED); Iljo Keisse (BEL) | Michael Mørkøv (DEN); Alex Rasmussen (DEN) | David Muntaner (ESP); Albert Torres (ESP) |
| 2016 | Sebastian Mora (ESP); Albert Torres (ESP) | Morgan Kneisky (FRA); Christian Grasmann (GER) | Niki Terpstra (NED); Yoeri Havik (NED) |
| 2017 | Christian Grasmann (GER); Roger Kluge (GER) | Michael Mørkøv (DEN); Lasse Norman Hansen (DEN) | Dylan van Baarle (NED); Wim Stroetinga (NED) |
| 2018 | Kenny de Ketele (BEL); Moreno de Pauw (BEL) | Yoeri Havik (NED); Wim Stroetinga (NED) | Morgan Kneisky (FRA); Benjamin Thomas (FRA) |
| 2019 | Niki Terpstra (NED); Thomas Boudat (FRA) | Lasse Norman Hansen (DEN); Marc Hester (DEN) | Yoeri Havik (NED); Wim Stroetinga (NED) |
| 2020 | (Netherlands) Yoeri Havik (Netherlands) Wim Stroetinga | (Belgium) Moreno De Pauw (Netherlands) Jan-Willem van Schip | (Belgium) Kenny De Ketele (Belgium) Robbe Ghys |
| 2021 | No race | | |
| 2022 | (Netherlands) Yoeri Havik (Netherlands) Niki Terpstra | (Belgium) Lindsay De Vylder (Belgium) Jules Hesters | (Italy) Elia Viviani (Netherlands) Vincent Hoppezak |
| 2023 | (Netherlands) Yoeri Havik (Netherlands) Jan-Willem van Schip | (Belgium) Lindsay De Vylder (Belgium) Jules Hesters | (Netherlands) Vincent Hoppezak (Netherlands) Philip Heijnen |
| 2024 | (Denmark) Michael Mørkøv (Denmark) Tobias Hansen | (Netherlands) Yoeri Havik (Netherlands) Jan-Willem van Schip | (Netherlands) Vincent Hoppezak (Netherlands) Philip Heijnen |
