= Six Days of Munich =

Cycling race

Race details
- Region: Munich, Germany
- Discipline: Track
- Type: Six-day racing

History
- First edition: 1933
- Final edition: 2009
- First winner: Franz Lehmann (GER); Oskar Tietz (GER)
- Most wins: Bruno Risi (SUI) (9)
- Final winner: Bruno Risi (SUI); Franco Marvulli (SUI)

The Six Days of Munich was a six-day track cycling race held annually in Munich, Germany. The event was first held in 1933 with the last edition held in 2009. Starting in 1972, the event was held at the Olympiahalle.

== Palmares ==
Year	Winners	Second	Third
1933	Franz Lehmann (GER); Oskar Tietz (GER)	Gustav Kilian (GER); Heinz Vöpel (GER)	Lothar Ehmer (GER); Georg Umbenhauer (GER)
1934–48	Not raced		
1949	Maurice Depauw (BEL); Robert Naeye (BEL)	Gilbert Doré (FRA); Robert Oubron (FRA)	Arie Vooren (NED); Gérard van Beek (NED)
1950 (1)	René Adriaensens (BEL); Robert Naeye (BEL)	Reginald Arnold (AUS); Alfred Strom (AUS)	Gustav Kilian (FRG); Jean Roth (SUI)
1950 (2)	Camiel Dekuysscher (BEL); Odiel Vanden Meerschaut (BEL)	Reginald Arnold (AUS); Ludwig Hörmann (FRG)	Arthur Sérès (FRA); Roger-Jean Le Nizhery (FRA)
1951	Emile Carrara (FRA); Guy Lapébie (FRA)	Severino Rigoni (ITA); Ferdinando Terruzzi (ITA)	Reginald Arnold (AUS); Alfred Strom (AUS)
1952	Ludwig Hörmann (FRG); Alfred Strom (AUS)	Emile Carrara (FRA); Dominique Forlini (FRA)	Roger De Corte (BEL); Odiel Vanden Meerschaut (BEL)
1953	Walter Bucher (SUI); Jean Roth (SUI)	Lucien Gillen (LUX); Ferdinando Terruzzi (ITA)	Werner Holthöfer (FRG); Hans Preiskeit (FRG)
1954	Ludwig Hörmann (FRG); Hans Preiskeit (FRG)	Evan Klamer (DEN); Kay-Werner Nielsen (DEN)	Valentin Petry (FRG); Walter Schürmann (FRG)
1955-71	non disputate		
1972	Sigi Renz (FRG); Wolfgang Schulze (FRG)	Albert Fritz (FRG); Wilfried Peffgen (FRG)	Patrick Sercu (BEL); Alain Van Lacker (FRA)
1973	Léo Duyndam (NED); René Pijnen (NED)	Graeme Gilmore (AUS); Dieter Kemper (FRG)	Sigi Renz (FRG); Wolfgang Schulze (FRG)
1974	Graeme Gilmore (AUS); Sigi Renz (FRG)	Wilfried Peffgen (FRG); Jürgen Tschan (FRG)	Jacky Mourioux (FRA); Alain Van Lacker (FRA)
1975	Gunther Haritz (GER); René Pijnen (NED)	Eddy Merckx (BEL); Patrick Sercu (BEL)	Albert Fritz (FRG); Wilfried Peffgen (FRG)
1976	Albert Fritz (FRG); Wilfried Peffgen (FRG)	Graeme Gilmore (AUS); Patrick Sercu (BEL)	Udo Hempel (FRG); Jürgen Tschan (FRG)
1977	Eddy Merckx (BEL); Patrick Sercu (BEL)	Danny Clark (AUS); Günther Schumacher (FRG)	Roman Hermann (LIE); René Pijnen (NED)
1978	Gregor Braun (FRG); Patrick Sercu (BEL)	Danny Clark (AUS); Gerrie Knetemann (NED)	Roman Hermann (LIE); Horst Schütz (FRG)
1979	Patrick Sercu (BEL); Dietrich Thurau (FRG)	Donald Allan (AUS); Danny Clark (AUS)	Francesco Moser (ITA); René Pijnen (NED)
1980	Donald Allan (AUS); Danny Clark (AUS)	Albert Fritz (FRG); Wilfried Peffgen (FRG)	Gert Frank (DEN); René Pijnen (NED)
1981	Donald Allan (AUS); Danny Clark (AUS)	René Pijnen (NED); Dietrich Thurau (FRG)	Roman Hermann (LIE); Horst Schütz (FRG)
1982	René Pijnen (NED); Patrick Sercu (BEL)	Albert Fritz (FRG); Dietrich Thurau (FRG)	Donald Allan (AUS); Danny Clark (AUS)
1983	Urs Freuler (SUI); René Pijnen (NED)	Gert Frank (DEN); Dietrich Thurau (FRG)	Josef Kristen (FRG); Horst Schütz (FRG)
1984	Gert Frank (DEN); Hans-Henrik Ørsted (DEN)	Urs Freuler (SUI); René Pijnen (NED)	Danny Clark (AUS); Dietrich Thurau (FRG)
1985	Urs Freuler (SUI); René Pijnen (NED)	Stan Tourné (BEL); Etienne De Wilde (BEL)	Tony Doyle (GBR); Gary Wiggins (AUS)
1986	Danny Clark (AUS); Dietrich Thurau (FRG)	Urs Freuler (SUI); René Pijnen (NED)	Roman Hermann (LIE); Josef Kristen (FRG)
1987	Urs Freuler (SUI); Dietrich Thurau (FRG)	Danny Clark (AUS); Tony Doyle (GBR)	Andreas Kappes (FRG); René Pijnen (NED)
1988	Danny Clark (AUS); Tony Doyle (GBR)	Stan Tourné (BEL); Etienne De Wilde (BEL)	Roman Hermann (LIE); Andreas Kappes (FRG)
1989	Andreas Kappes (FRG); Etienne De Wilde (BEL)	Adriano Baffi (ITA); Pierangelo Bincoletto (ITA)	Danny Clark (AUS); Rolf Gölz (FRG)
1990	Danny Clark (AUS); Tony Doyle (GBR)	Adriano Baffi (ITA); Pierangelo Bincoletto (ITA)	Andreas Kappes (FRG); Etienne De Wilde (BEL)
1991	Andreas Kappes (FRG); Etienne De Wilde (BEL)	Peter Pieters (NED); Remig Stumpf (GER)	Danny Clark (AUS); Tony Doyle (GBR)
1992	Urs Freuler (SUI); Olaf Ludwig (GER)	Adriano Baffi (ITA); Pierangelo Bincoletto (ITA)	Kurt Betschart (SUI); Bruno Risi (SUI)
1993	Kurt Betschart (SUI); Bruno Risi (SUI)	Andreas Kappes (FRG); Etienne De Wilde (BEL)	Adriano Baffi (ITA); Pierangelo Bincoletto (ITA)
1994	Kurt Betschart (SUI); Bruno Risi (SUI)	Urs Freuler (SUI); Karsten Wolf (GER)	Danny Clark (AUS); Etienne De Wilde (BEL)
1995	Erik Zabel (GER); Etienne De Wilde (BEL)	Adriano Baffi (ITA); Giovanni Lombardi (ITA)	Jimmi Madsen (DEN); Jens Veggerby (DEN)
1996	Adriano Baffi (ITA); Giovanni Lombardi (ITA)	Kurt Betschart (SUI); Bruno Risi (SUI)	Silvio Martinello (ITA); Marco Villa (ITA)
1997	Kurt Betschart (SUI); Bruno Risi (SUI)	Silvio Martinello (ITA); Bjarne Riis (DEN)	Jimmi Madsen (DEN); Jens Veggerby (DEN)
1998	Kurt Betschart (SUI); Bruno Risi (SUI)	Adriano Baffi (ITA); Andreas Kappes (GER)	Tayeb Braikia (DEN); Jimmi Madsen (DEN)
1999	Andreas Kappes (GER); Silvio Martinello (ITA)	Kurt Betschart (SUI); Bruno Risi (SUI)	Robert Bartko (GER); Scott McGrory (AUS)
2000	Kurt Betschart (SUI); Bruno Risi (SUI)	Silvio Martinello (ITA); Marco Villa (ITA)	Robert Bartko (GER); Erik Zabel (GER)
2001	Silvio Martinello (ITA); Erik Zabel (GER)	Kurt Betschart (SUI); Bruno Risi (SUI)	Matthew Gilmore (BEL); Scott McGrory (AUS)
2002	Matthew Gilmore (BEL); Scott McGrory (AUS)	Kurt Betschart (SUI); Bruno Risi (SUI)	Andreas Beikirch (GER); Andreas Kappes (GER)
2003	Bruno Risi (SUI); Kurt Betschart (SUI)	Matthew Gilmore (BEL); Scott McGrory (AUS)	Andreas Beikirch (GER); Andreas Kappes (GER)
2004	Matthew Gilmore (BEL); Scott McGrory (AUS)	Robert Slippens (NED); Danny Stam (NED)	Andreas Beikirch (GER); Andreas Kappes (GER)
2005	Erik Zabel (GER); Robert Bartko (GER)	Robert Slippens (NED); Danny Stam (NED)	Bruno Risi (SUI); Kurt Betschart (SUI)
2006	Erik Zabel (GER); Bruno Risi (SUI)	Franco Marvulli (SUI); Iljo Keisse (BEL)	Danny Stam (NED); Peter Schep (NED)
2007	Bruno Risi (SUI); Franco Marvulli (SUI)	Erik Zabel (GER); Leif Lampater (GER)	Robert Slippens (NED); Danny Stam (NED)
2008	Iljo Keisse (BEL); Robert Bartko (GER)	Erik Zabel (GER); Leif Lampater (GER)	Olaf Pollack (GER); Roger Kluge (GER)
2009	Bruno Risi (SUI); Franco Marvulli (SUI)	Alex Rasmussen (DEN); Michael Mørkøv (DEN)	Leif Lampater (GER); Christian Grasmann (GER)
