= Six Days of Stuttgart =

Six-day track cycling race

Race details
- Region: Stuttgart, Germany
- Discipline: Track
- Type: Six-day racing

History
- First edition: 1928
- Editions: 31 (as of 2008)
- Final edition: 2008
- First winner: Piet van Kempen (NED); Gottfried Hürtgen (GER)
- Most wins: Andreas Kappes (GER) (6 wins)
- Final winner: Iljo Keisse (BEL); Leif Lampater (GER); Robert Bartko (GER)

The Six Days of Stuttgart was a six-day track cycling race held annually in Stuttgart, Germany.

== Winners ==
Year	Winner
1928	(Netherlands) Piet van Kempen (Germany) Theo Frankenstein
1929 (1)	(Switzerland) Emil Richli (Italy) Pietro Linari
1929 (2)	(Netherlands) Piet van Kempen (Germany) Paul Buschenhagen
1930	No race
1931 (1)	(Germany) Fritz Preuss (Germany) Paul Resiger
1931 (2)	(Germany) Victor Rausch (Germany) Gottfried Hürtgen
1932	No race
1933	(Netherlands) Jan Pijnenburg (Switzerland) Emil Richli
1934–83	No race
1984	(West Germany) Gregor Braun (Denmark) Gert Frank
1985	(West Germany) Henry Rinklin (West Germany) Josef Kristen
1986	(Netherlands) René Pijnen (Denmark) Gert Frank
1987	(West Germany) Josef Kristen (Liechtenstein) Roman Hermann

Any	Guanyadors
1988	(West Germany) Dietrich Thurau (Liechtenstein) Roman Hermann
1989	(West Germany) Uwe Bolten (Australia) Danny Clark
1990	(Belgium) Etienne De Wilde (West Germany) Volker Diehl
1991	(Belgium) Etienne De Wilde (Germany) Andreas Kappes
1992	(Australia) Danny Clark (Italy) Pierangelo Bincoletto
1993	(Belgium) Etienne De Wilde (Germany) Andreas Kappes
1994	(Belgium) Etienne De Wilde (Denmark) Jens Veggerby
1995	(Australia) Danny Clark (Belgium) Etienne De Wilde
1996	(Denmark) Jimmi Madsen (Denmark) Jens Veggerby
1997	(Germany) Carsten Wolf (Germany) Andreas Kappes
1998	(Switzerland) Bruno Risi (Switzerland) Kurt Betschart
1999	(Italy) Adriano Baffi (Germany) Andreas Kappes

Year	Winners
2000	(Italy) Silvio Martinello (Germany) Andreas Kappes
2001	(Italy) Silvio Martinello (Italy) Marco Villa
2002	(Switzerland) Bruno Risi (Switzerland) Kurt Betschart
2003	(Belgium) Matthew Gilmore (Australia) Scott McGrory
2004	(Germany) Andreas Beikirch (Germany) Andreas Kappes (Germany) Gerd Dörich
2005	(Switzerland) Bruno Risi (Switzerland) Franco Marvulli (Switzerland) Kurt Betschart
2006	(Germany) Robert Bartko (Germany) Guido Fulst (Germany) Leif Lampater
2007	(Switzerland) Bruno Risi (Switzerland) Franco Marvulli (Switzerland) Alexander Äschbach
2008	(Germany) Robert Bartko (Belgium) Iljo Keisse (Germany) Leif Lampater
