= Coca-Cola Trophy =

Race details
- Region: Germany
- Discipline: Road
- Type: Criterium series
- Race director: Winfried Holtmann

History
- First edition: 1979
- Editions: 20
- Final edition: 2000
- First winner: Klaus-Peter Thaler (GER)
- Most wins: Erik Zabel (GER)
- Final winner: Gian Matteo Fagnini (ITA)

The Coca-Cola Trophy was a series of criterium cycling races held annually throughout Germany from 1979 to 2000. The competition consisted of up to eight races contested in different German cities, generally located in the south of the country such as Sindelfingen, Heilbronn, Ulm, Erlangen, Regensburg, all of which contributing to the overall title.

== Winners ==
- 1979 : (Germany) Klaus-Peter Thaler
- 1982 : (Germany) Klaus-Peter Thaler
- 1983 : (Germany) Gregor Braun
- 1984 : (Germany) Henry Rinklin
- 1985 : (Belgium) Guido Van Calster
- 1986 : (Germany) Dietrich Thurau
- 1987 : (Germany) Dietrich Thurau
- 1988 : (Germany) Reimund Dietzen
- 1989 : (Germany) Andreas Kappes
- 1990 : (Netherlands) Ad Wijnands
- 1991 : (Germany) Peter Gänsler
- 1992 : (Germany) Raimund Lehnert
- 1993 : (Germany) Erik Zabel
- 1994 : (Switzerland) Urs Freuler
- 1995 : (Germany) Andreas Kappes
- 1996 : (Belgium) Gert Vanderaerden
- 1997 : (Germany) Andreas Beikirch
- 1998 : (Germany) Erik Zabel
- 1999 : (Germany) Erik Zabel
- 2000 : (Italy) Gian Matteo Fagnini
