= Roman Hermann =

Liechtensteiner track cyclist (born 1953)

Personal information
- Born: 27 March 1953 (age 73) Schaan, Liechtenstein

Cycling career
- Sport: Cycling
- Current team: Retired
- Discipline: Track
- Role: Rider
Medal record
Men's track cycling
Representing Liechtenstein
World Championships
Bronze medal – third place	1982 Leicester	Points race

Roman Hermann (born 27 March 1953 in Schaan) is a Liechtensteiner former cyclist. He is the brother of fellow cyclists Sigmund and Peter Hermann.

== Major results ==
1979
3rd Derny, UEC European Track Championships
1980
1st Six Days of Zürich (with Horst Schütz)
1981
1st Six Days of Hanover (with Horst Schütz)
2nd Madison, UEC European Track Championships
1982
3rd Points race, UCI World Track Championships
1984
1st Six Days of Buenos Aires (with Eduardo Trillini)
2nd Madison, UEC European Track Championships
1985
1st Six Days of Dortmund (with Josef Kristen)
1986
1st Six Days of Cologne (with Sigmund Hermann)
1st Six Days of Madrid (with Sigmund Hermann)
1987
1st Six Days of Münster (with Josef Kristen)
1st Six Days of Stuttgart (with Josef Kristen)
1st Six Days of Dortmund (with Danny Clark)
1st Six Days of Bassano del Grappa (with Moreno Argentin & Anthony Doyle)
1st Madison, UEC European Track Championships (with Josef Kristen)
1988
1st Six Days of Ghent (with Urs Freuler)
1st Six Days of Copenhagen (with Hans-Henrik Ørsted)
1st Six Days of Stuttgart (with Dietrich Thurau)
1st Six Days of Grenoble (with Charly Mottet)
UEC European Track Championships

3rd Madison
3rd Derny

1989
1st Six Days of Bremen (with Andreas Kappes)
