= Josef Kristen =

German track cyclist

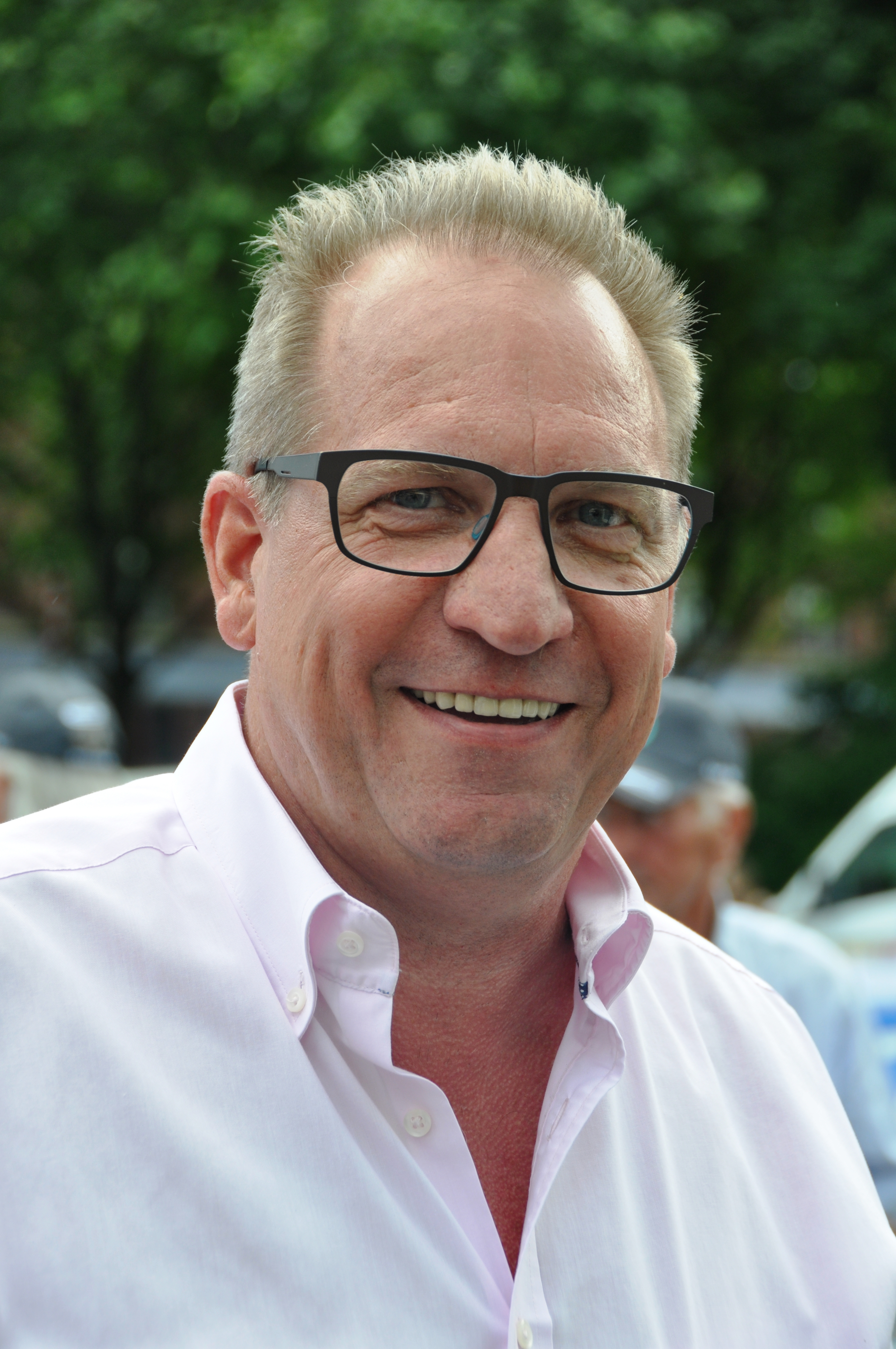
- Kristen in 2017

Personal information
- Born: 28 January 1960 (age 66) Cologne, Germany

Cycling career
- Sport: Cycling
- Current team: Retired
- Discipline: Track
- Role: Rider

Professional teams
- 1981: Peugeot Zweirad
- 1982: Teka
- 1983: Peugeot–ABS Autobanden
- 1984–1985: Renn Tour–Bi Bici
- 1986–1988: Gonso–Dunova

Josef Kristen (born 28 January 1960) is a German former professional track cyclist.

== Major results ==
1980
3rd Points race, UCI Amateur Track World Championships
1982
2nd Madison, European Track Championships
1982
3rd Madison, European Track Championships
1983
3rd Madison, European Track Championships
1984
1st Six Days of Cologne (with René Pijnen)
3rd Madison, European Track Championships
1985
1st Six Days of Stuttgart (with Henry Rinklin)
1st Six Days of Dortmund (with Roman Hermann)
1986
1st Six Days of Bremen (with Dietrich Thurau)
1987
1st Madison, European Track Championships (with Roman Hermann)
1st Six Days of Münster (with Roman Hermann)
1st Six Days of Stuttgart (with Roman Hermann)
