= Robert Bartko =

German cyclist (born 1975)

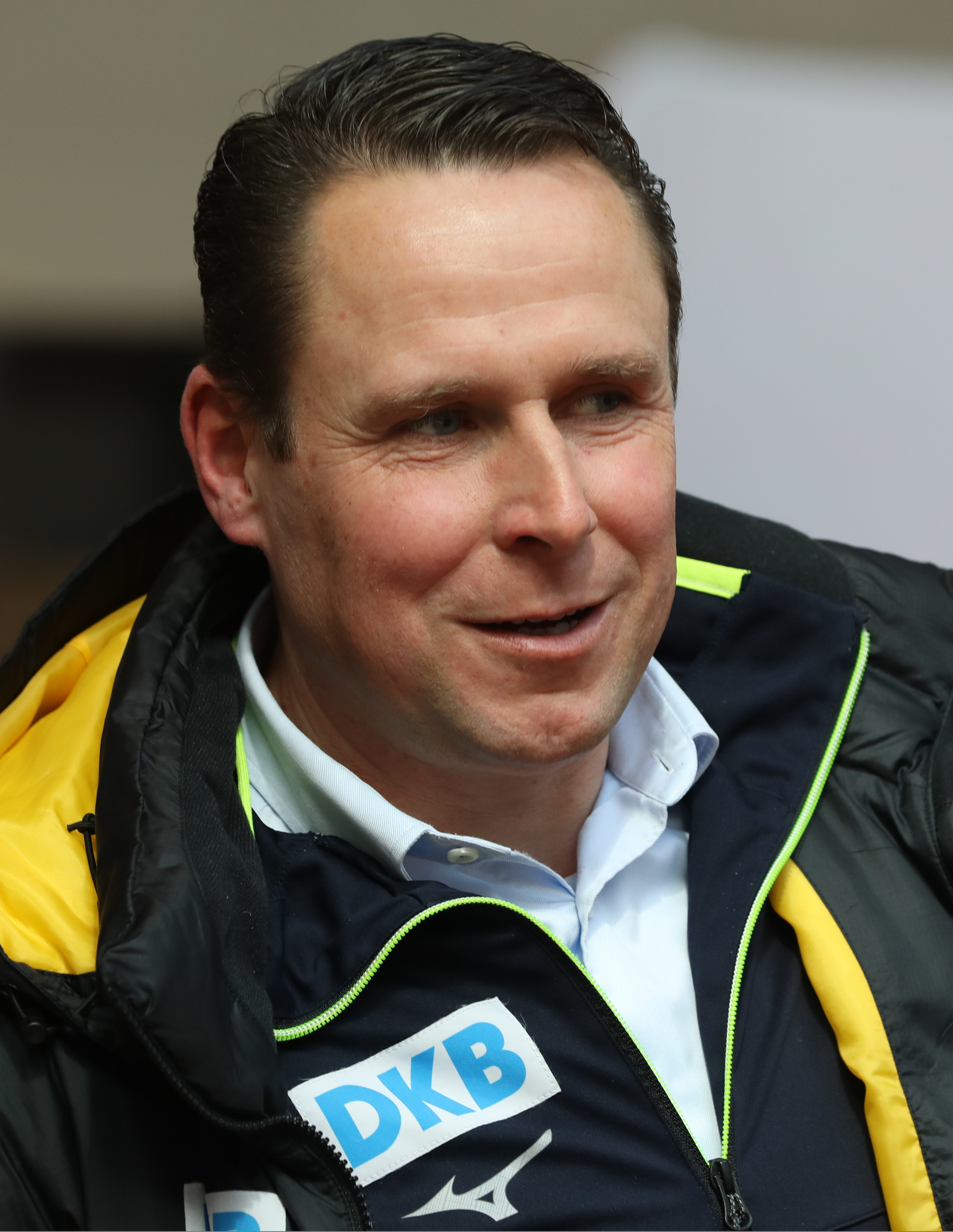
- Bartko in 2018

Personal information
- Full name: Robert Bartko
- Born: 23 December 1975 (age 50) Potsdam, East Germany

Cycling career
- Sport: Cycling
- Current team: Retired
- Disciplines: Track; Road
- Role: Rider

Amateur teams
- 1999–2000: Peugeot Team Berlin
- 2000: Skilled-Germany
- 2005–2008: RSV Werner Otto Berlin
- 2006: Team BDR

Professional teams
- 2001–2002: Team Telekom
- 2003–2004: Rabobank
- 2009–2014: LKT Team Brandenburg
Medal record
Representing Germany
Men's track cycling
Olympic Games
Gold medal – first place	2000 Sydney	Individual Pursuit
Gold medal – first place	2000 Sydney	Team Pursuit

Robert Bartko (born 23 December 1975) is a German former road and track cyclist, who competed professionally between 2001 and 2014. Born in the former East Germany, Bartko won two gold medals at the 2000 Summer Olympics in Sydney, Australia: in the individual and in the team pursuit.

== Major results ==
=== Track ===
1998
UCI World Cup Classics

1st Individual pursuit
1st Team pursuit (with Christian Lademann, Daniel Becke and Guido Fulst)

UCI World Championships

2nd Team pursuit (with Christian Lademann, Daniel Becke and Guido Fulst)
3rd Individual pursuit

1999
UCI World Championships

1st Individual pursuit
1st Team pursuit (with Jens Lehmann, Daniel Becke and Guido Fulst)

3rd Six Days of Munich (with Scott McGrory)
2000
Olympic Games

1st Individual pursuit
1st Team pursuit (with Jens Lehmann, Daniel Becke and Guido Fulst)

National Championships

1st Team pursuit (with Guido Fulst, Andre Kalfack and Andreas Müller)
2nd Individual pursuit
3rd Madison (with Andreas Kappes)

2nd Six Days of Dortmund (with Silvio Martinello)
3rd Six Days of Berlin (with Scott McGrory)
3rd Six Days of Munich (with Erik Zabel)
2002
3rd Six Days of Berlin (with Andreas Beikirch)
2004
1st Individual pursuit, 2004 UCI Track Cycling World Cup Classics, Moscow
2004–05 UCI Track Cycling World Cup Classics, Los Angeles

1st Individual pursuit
1st Madison (with Leif Lampater)
1st Team pursuit (with Robert Bengsch, Henning Bommel and Leif Lampater)

1st Six Days of Berlin (with Guido Fulst)
3rd Individual pursuit, UCI World Championships
2005
1st Individual pursuit, UCI World Championships
National Championships

1st Individual pursuit
1st Madison (with Guido Fulst)
1st Team pursuit (with Guido Fulst, Karl-Christian König and Leif Lampater)

1st Six Days of Bremen (with Andreas Beikirch)
1st Six Days of Munich (with Erik Zabel)
2nd Six Days of Berlin (with Guido Fulst)
3rd Six Days of Dortmund (with Andreas Beikirch)
2006
1st Individual pursuit, UCI World Championships
National Championships

1st Individual pursuit
1st Madison (with Andreas Beikirch)
1st Team pursuit (with Guido Fulst, Karl-Christian König and Robert Kriegs)

2006–07 UCI Track Cycling World Cup Classics, Moscow

1st Individual pursuit
3rd Team pursuit (with Robert Bengsch, Guido Fulst and Leif Lampater)

1st Six Days of Stuttgart (with Guido Fulst and Leif Lampater)
2nd Six Days of Zürich (with Iljo Keisse)
3rd Six Days of Bremen (with Andreas Beikirch)
3rd Six Days of Rotterdam (with Andreas Beikirch)
2007
National Championships

1st Individual pursuit
1st Team pursuit (with Guido Fulst, Karl-Christian König and Frank Schulz)

1st Six Days of Amsterdam (with Iljo Keisse)
1st Six Days of Ghent (with Iljo Keisse)
1st Six Days of Rotterdam (with Iljo Keisse)
2nd Individual pursuit, UCI World Championships
2nd Six Days of Berlin (with Andreas Beikirch)
2nd Six Days of Zürich (with Iljo Keisse)
3rd Six Days of Bremen (with Iljo Keisse)
3rd Six Days of Dortmund (with Andreas Beikirch)
2008
1st Six Days of Bremen (with Iljo Keisse)
1st Six Days of Ghent (with Iljo Keisse)
1st Six Days of Munich (with Iljo Keisse)
1st Six Days of Stuttgart (with Iljo Keisse and Leif Lampater)
2nd Omnium, UEC European Championships
2nd Six Days of Dortmund (with Andreas Beikirch)
3rd Six Days of Rotterdam (with Iljo Keisse)
2009
UEC European Championships

1st Madison (with Roger Kluge)
2nd Omnium

1st Six Days of Amsterdam (with Roger Kluge)
1st Six Days of Berlin (with Erik Zabel)
2010
1st Six Days of Amsterdam (with Roger Kluge)
1st Six Days of Zürich (with Danilo Hondo)
2nd Six Days of Berlin (with Roger Kluge)
2nd Six Days of Bremen (with Iljo Keisse)
2nd Six Days of Copenhagen (with Iljo Keisse)
2011
1st Six Days of Berlin (with Roger Kluge)
1st Six Days of Bremen (with Robert Bengsch)
1st Six Days of Ghent (with Kenny De Ketele)
2nd Six Days of Rotterdam (with Pim Ligthart)
3rd Six Days of Zürich (with Danilo Hondo)
2012
1st Six Days of Bremen (with Peter Schep)
3rd Six Days of Copenhagen (with Leif Lampater)
3rd Six Days of Ghent (with Silvan Dillier)
2013
3rd Six Days of Bremen (with Peter Schep)
2014
1st Six Days of Copenhagen (with Marcel Kalz)
2nd Six Days of Bremen (with Marcel Kalz)
3rd Six Days of Berlin (with Theo Reinhardt)

=== Road ===
1999
1st Stage 5b Sachsen Tour
2002
2nd Overall Niedersachsen-Rundfahrt

1st Stage 5

2003
1st Stage 4 Tour de Luxembourg
3rd Overall Tour of Belgium
2004
1st Overall Driedaagse van West-Vlaanderen

1st Prologue

2005
1st Stage 1 Tour of Hungary
2007
3rd Time trial, National Road Championships
2008
1st Rund um Berlin
