= Günther Ziegler =

German cyclist

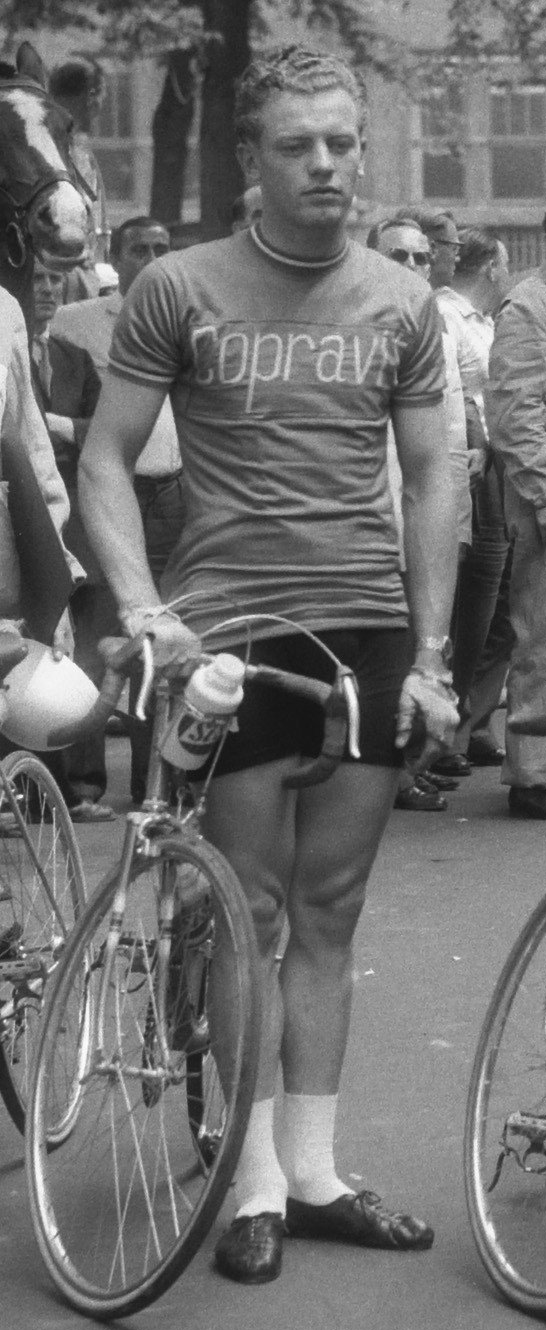
- Ziegler at the 1958 Tour of the Netherlands

Personal information
- Born: 18 January 1933 Dittelbrunn, Germany
- Died: 19 December 2013 (aged 80) Schweinfurt, Germany

Cycling career
- Sport: Cycling
Medal record
Representing Germany
UEC European Track Championships
Silver medal – second place	1961	Madison

Günther Engelhart Ziegler (18 January 1933 – 19 December 2013) was a German cyclist. He competed in the tandem sprint at the 1956 Summer Olympics, and finished last after a crash during a repechage round.

Ziegler was a German amateur champion in 1952–1956 in the team time trial. After the 1956 Olympics he turned professional, and in 1961 won the national sprint title, placing second in 1957, 1959–60, 1962, and 1964. He also won the six-day race of Essen in 1960.
