= Tony Doyle (cyclist) =

British cyclist (1958–2023)

Tony Doyle MBE
Personal information
- Born: 19 May 1958 Ashford, Middlesex, England
- Died: 30 April 2023 (aged 64)
- Height: 6 ft 1 in (1.85 m)

Cycling career
- Sport: Cycling
- Disciplines: Track & Road
- Role: Rider
- Rider type: Six-day

Professional teams
- 1980–1982: KP Crisps – Viscount (GBR)
- 1984: RMC – Security Grille Protections (GBR)
- 1985: RMC – Ammaco (Great-Britain
- 1986: Ever Ready – Ammaco (Great-Britain)
- 1989: Ever Ready (Great-Britain)
- 1990: Ever Ready – Halfords
- 1991: European Newspaper (Great-Britain)
- 1993: Neilson Tivoli (Great Britain)
- 1994: Futurama (Great Britain)

Major wins
- World Champion, Pursuit (1980 & 1986), European Madison Champion (1984, 1988 & 1989) European Omnium Champion (1988/89)
Medal record
Cycling
Representing Great Britain
UCI Track Cycling World Championships
Gold medal – first place	1986 Colorado Springs	Individual pursuit
Silver medal – second place	1984 Barcelona	Individual pursuit
Silver medal – second place	1987 Viena	Points race
Bronze medal – third place	1987 Viena	Individual pursuit
European Track Championships
Gold medal – first place	1984 Zurich	Madison
Gold medal – first place	1988 Copenhagen	Madison
Gold medal – first place	1989 Ghent	Madison
Silver medal – second place	1983 Copenhagen	Madison
Silver medal – second place	1985 Copenhagen	Madison
Silver medal – second place	1989 Copenhagen	Omnium
Bronze medal – third place	1983 Herning	Omnium
Representing England
Commonwealth Games
Silver medal – second place	1994 Victoria	Team pursuit
Bronze medal – third place	1978 Edmonton	Pursuit
Bronze medal – third place	1978 Edmonton	Team pursuit

Anthony Paul Doyle MBE (19 May 1958 – 30 April 2023) was a British professional cyclist.

== Biography ==
Doyle was born in Ashford, Middlesex on 19 May 1958. He was world pursuit champion in 1980 and 1986. He was a professional between 1980 and 1995, riding for British teams.

Doyle represented England and won two bronze medals in the 4,000 metres individual and team pursuit events, at the 1978 Commonwealth Games in Edmonton, Alberta, Canada.

Doyle finished seventh in the team pursuit at the 1980 Summer Olympics in Moscow as part of the British team. He was not selected for the individual pursuit even though he was the national champion. The place went to Sean Yates. As a result, Doyle turned professional and won the world professional pursuit championship, beating Bert Oosterbosch and Herman Ponsteen. He then raced six-day track races with a variety of partners before achieving great results partnering the Australian Danny Clark.

Doyle became a regular in six-day track races during the 1980s, winning 23 six days. As a result, he was and still is Britain's most successful six day rider. He was noted for fluid and rapid pedalling, which brought him an unofficial UK time-trial record for 25 miles on a 72-inch gear in 56m 30s.

In 1989 Tony Doyle suffered from a serious head injury and multiple fractures at the Munich Six day. He was given the last rites and was in a coma for ten days. He spent six weeks in ITU, followed by two months in a rehabilitation centre. Due to the extent of his injuries it was predicted that he would be unable to return to professional racing.

Doyle received the Bidlake Memorial Prize in 1980 following his first world championship. He was appointed a Member of the Most Excellent Order of the British Empire (MBE) for services to cycling in the 1988 Birthday Honours.

Doyle took silver in the team pursuit at the 1994 Commonwealth Games in Victoria, British Columbia, Canada.

Unfortunately, a broken back as a result of a crash at the Six Day in Zurich ended his professional career. After that he remained in sport and in particular cycling. Doyle was elected President of British Cycling in late 1995 on a platform of increasing transparency and accountability. However, British Cycling's board attempted to remove him shortly afterwards: two weeks after this, he resigned. He was the founder director of the Tour of Britain which restarted in 1994. In 2009, he was inducted into the British Cycling Hall of Fame. Tony Doyle was Chairman of the Olympic Delivery Board for the London Borough of Southwark.

His son George, was born in 1992. Daughter Gemma, was born in 1995 and his youngest son James was born in 1999.

Doyle died from pancreatic cancer on 30 April 2023, at the age of 64.

== Major results ==
=== Track ===
1978
Commonwealth Games

3rd Individual pursuit
3rd Team pursuit

1980
1st Individual pursuit, UCI Track World Championships
1981
1st Individual pursuit, National Track Championships
2nd Omnium, European Track Championships
1983
1st Six Days of Berlin (with Danny Clark)
1st Six Days of Dortmund (with Danny Clark)
2nd Madison (with Gary Wiggins), European Track Championships
3rd Omnium, European Track Championships
1984
1st Madison (with Gary Wiggins), European Track Championships
2nd Individual pursuit, UCI Track World Championships
1985
1st Six Days of Bremen (with Gary Wiggins)
1st Six Days of Maastricht (with Danny Clark)
2nd Individual pursuit, UCI Track World Championships
2nd Madison (with Gary Wiggins), European Track Championships
1986
1st Individual pursuit, UCI Track World Championships
1st Six Days of Ghent (with Danny Clark)
1st Six Days of Berlin (with Danny Clark)
1st Six Days of Dortmund (with Danny Clark)
1st Six Days of Grenoble (with Francesco Moser)
1987
UCI Track World Championships

2nd Points race
3rd Individual pursuit

1st Six Days of Maastricht (with Danny Clark)
1st Six Days of Copenhagen (with Danny Clark)
1st Six Days of Bremen (with Danny Clark)
1st Six Days of Paris (with Danny Clark)
1st Six Days of Bassano Del Grappa (with Moreno Argentin)
1988
1st Madison (with Danny Clark), European Track Championships
1st Six Days of Munster (with Danny Clark)
1st Six Days of Berlin (with Danny Clark)
1st Six Days of Dortmund (with Danny Clark)
1st Six Days of Munich (with Danny Clark)
1st Six Days of Launceston (with Danny Clark)
1st Six Days of Copenhagen (with Danny Clark)
1st Six Days of Rotterdam (with Danny Clark)
2nd Individual pursuit, UCI Track World Championships
1989
1st Madison (with Danny Clark), European Track Championships
1st Omnium, European Track Championships
1st Six Days of Cologne (with Danny Clark)
1990
1st Six Days of Munich (with Danny Clark)
1991
1st Six Days of Ghent (with Etienne De Wilde)
1994
2nd Team pursuit, Commonwealth Games

=== Road ===
1976
2nd National junior road race series
1977
1st Manchester–Rhyl Stage Race
1979
2nd Overall Circuit des Ardennes
1st 13 times in French Road Races
1980
1st 4 times in French Road Races
1981
1st Overall Girvan Three Day
1982
1st Overall Girvan Three Day
1983
1st Kelloggs Nottingham City Centre
1st Stage 5 Sealink International
1984
2nd Overall Sealink International

1st Stage 3

1986
1st Overall Ron Kitching Classic

1st Stage 1

1st Stage 5 Sealink International
1st Kelloggs Westminster City Centre
1989
1st Stage 8 Milk Race
1992
3rd Tom Simpson Memorial RR
1993
1st Stage 3 Rás Tailteann
1994
1st Victor Belmont Road Race
