= Henry Rinklin =

German track and road cyclist

Personal information
- Born: 15 September 1957 (age 69) Geisingen, Germany
- Height: 1.8 m (5 ft 11 in)
- Weight: 73 kg (161 lb)

Cycling career
- Sport: Cycling
- Current team: Retired
- Disciplines: Track; Road
- Role: Rider

Professional teams
- 1980: Puch–Sem–Campagnolo
- 1981: Puch–Wolber–Campagnolo
- 1982–1983: Royal–Wrangler–Campagnolo
- 1984: Renn Tour–Bi Bici
- 1985–1987: Gonso–Dunova
- 1987: Commodore
Medal record
Representing Germany
Men's track cycling
World Championships
Bronze medal – third place	1984 Barcelona	Points race

Henry Rinklin (born 15 September 1957) is a German former professional track and road cyclist.

== Major results ==
=== Track ===
1975
1st Points race, UCI Junior Track World Championships
1977
2nd Team pursuit, UCI Amateur Track World Championships
1982
1st Six Days of Dortmund (with Danny Clark
1983
3rd Madison, European Track Championships
1984
3rd Points race, UCI Track World Championships
3rd Madison, European Track Championships
1985
1st Six Days of Stuttgart (with Josef Kristen)

=== Road ===
1981
2nd Züri-Metzgete
3rd Overall Tour d'Indre-et-Loire
7th GP du canton d'Argovie
9th Grand Prix Cerami
1982
1st Stage 4 Deutschland Tour
1984
1st Overall Coca-Cola Trophy
