= Maurizio Bidinost =

Italian cyclist

Personal information
- Born: 10 January 1959 (age 67) Cordenons, Italy

Sport
- Sport: Cycling
Medal record
Representing Italy
Track World Championships
| Silver medal – second place | 1979 Amsterdam | Individual pursuit |
| Bronze medal – third place | 1979 Amsterdam | Team pursuit |
| Bronze medal – third place | 1981 Brno | Individual pursuit |
| Bronze medal – third place | 1982 Leicester | Individual pursuit |

Maurizio Bidinost (born 10 January 1959) is a retired Italian cyclist who was active on the road and track between 1979 and 1986, turning professional in 1981. On track, he won one silver and three bronze medals in the individual and team pursuit events at the world championships of 1979–1982 and the Six-day races of Nouméa (1980 and 1981) and Berlin (1982).
