= Pierangelo Bincoletto =

Italian cyclist

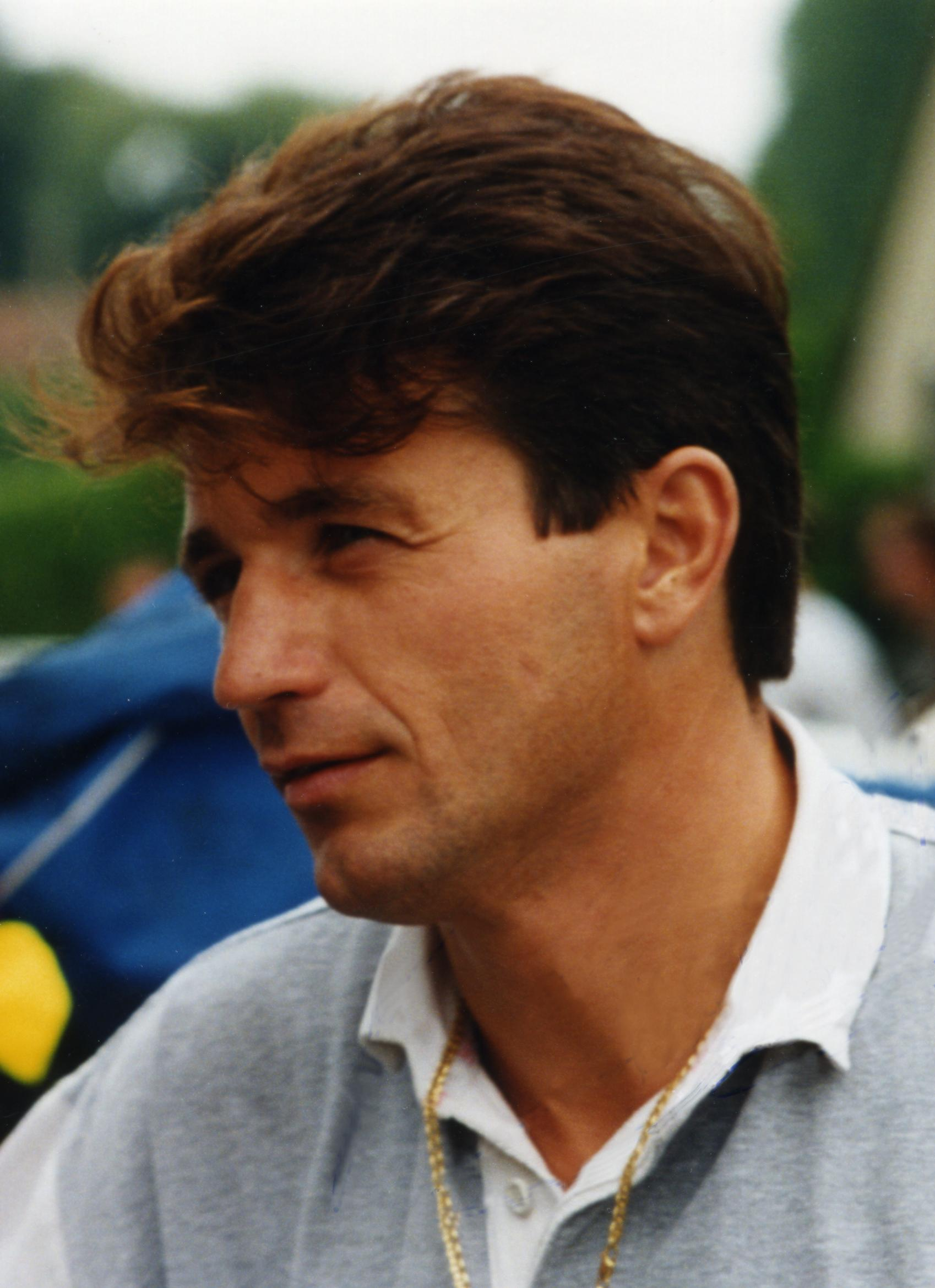
- Pierangelo Bincoletto

Personal information
- Born: 14 March 1959 (age 67) Oderzo, Italy

Cycling career
- Sport: Cycling
- Disciplines: Road; Track
- Role: Rider

Amateur team
- 1978–1980: SC La Nuova Baggio–San Siro

Professional teams
- 1980–1982: Mobili San Giacomo–Benotto
- 1983–1985: Metauro Mobili–Pinarello
- 1986: Malvor–Bottecchia–Vaporella
- 1987: RMO–Cycles Méral–Mavic
- 1988–1989: Toshiba–Look
- 1990–1992: Diana–Colnago–Animex
- 1993: Mercatone Uno–Zucchini–Medeghini
- 1994: ZG Mobili
- 1995: Sidi
- 1996: Agrigel–La Creuse–Fenioux

Pierangelo Bincoletto (born 14 March 1959) is an Italian former professional racing cyclist. He rode in two editions of the Tour de France and seven editions of the Giro d'Italia. He also competed in two events at the 1980 Summer Olympics.

== Major results ==
=== Track ===
1979
UCI Amateur World Championships

2nd Points race
3rd Team pursuit

1982
1st Points race, National Championships
2nd Madison (with Maurizio Bidinost), UEC European Championships
1987
1st Six Days of Rotterdam (with Danny Clark)
1989
1st Six Days of Zürich (with Adriano Baffi)
1st Six Days of Bordeaux (with Laurent Biondi)
1990
1st Madison (with Jens Veggerby), UEC European Championships
1st Six Days of Zürich (with Adriano Baffi)
1992
1st Six Days of Stuttgart (with Danny Clark)
1st Six Days of Grenoble (with Gilbert Duclos-Lassalle)
1993
1st Six Days of Grenoble (with Gilbert Duclos-Lassalle)
1994
1st Six Days of Bologna (with Adriano Baffi)
1995
2nd Madison (with Marco Villa), UEC European Championships

=== Road ===
1977
UCI Junior World Championships

3rd Team time trial
10th Road race

1978
1st Piccolo Giro di Lombardia
1st La Popolarissima
1st Stages 1 & 3 Giro della Valle d'Aosta
1979
1st Milano-Busseto
1982
2nd GP Alghero
9th Tre Valli Varesine
1984
1st Stage 3 Giro del Trentino
10th GP Industria & Artigianato di Larciano
1988
2nd Tour de Vendée

=== Grand Tour general classification results timeline ===
Grand Tour	1981	1982	1983	1984	1985	1986	1987	1988
Giro d'Italia	56	DNF	104	66	DNF	75	—	101
Tour de France	—	—	DNF	—	—	128	—	—
Vuelta a España	—	—	—	—	—	—	—	

Legend
—	Did not compete
DNF	Did not finish
