= Danny Clark (cyclist) =

Australian cyclist (born 1951)

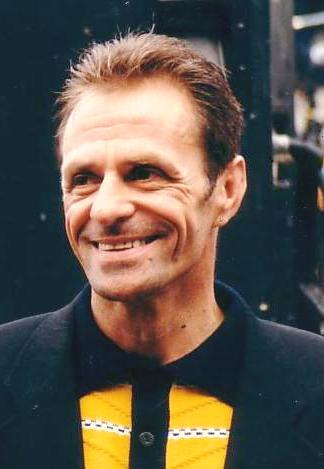

Personal information
- Full name: Daniel Clark
- Born: 30 August 1951 (age 75) George Town, Tasmania, Australia

Cycling career
- Sport: Cycling
- Discipline: Track
- Role: Rider

Major wins
- European championships: Omnium 1978, 1979, 1984, 1985, 1986, 1988; Derny 1985, 1986, 1990; Motor-paced 1988; Madison 1979, 1988
Medal record
Representing Australia
Men's cycling
Olympic Games
Silver medal – second place	1972 Munich	1000m time trial
Commonwealth Games
Silver medal – second place	1970 Edinburgh	Individual Pursuit
Men's track cycling
UCI Track Cycling World Championships
Gold medal – first place	1980 Besancon	Keirin
Gold medal – first place	1981 Brno	Keirin
Gold medal – first place	1988 Ghent	Motor-paced
Gold medal – first place	1991 Stuttgart	Motor-paced
Silver medal – second place	1981 Brno	Points
Silver medal – second place	1982 Leicester	Keirin
Silver medal – second place	1983 Zurich	Keirin
Silver medal – second place	1985 Bassano del Grappa	Motor-paced
Silver medal – second place	1987 Vienna	Motor-paced
Bronze medal – third place	1990 Maebashi	Motor-paced
Bronze medal – third place	1990 Maebashi	Points

Daniel Clark OAM (born 30 August 1951) is an Australian former track cyclist and road bicycle racer, who was a professional rider from 1974 to 1997. He won five world championships and at the 1972 Summer Olympics in Munich, West Germany, came second in the 1,000m time trial.

Clark was often the fastest finishing rider in six-day races, especially as Patrick Sercu slowed after the mid-1970s. Clark and British rider, Tony Doyle, won many six-day races. He enjoyed the party atmosphere of the races, and continued to work in them as a Derny pacer after retiring.

== Biography ==
Clark began cycling on a bike borrowed from a local enthusiast, which he used for three months before acquiring his eldest brother's semi-racer. He became one of the most successful riders in six-day racing in the 1970s and 1980s, winning 74 races, second to Patrick Sercu's 88. Most of these wins came after a crash in the 1983 Frankfurt six-day which broke his hip. Clark still carries a plate inserted to help the fracture heal and said that when sprinting or climbing, only his right leg delivered full power.

Clark won the Australian one-mile penny-farthing championship in Evandale, Tasmania, in 1989, beating the Briton Doug Pinkerton and Matthew Driver.

He lives in Surfers Paradise, near Brisbane.

== Major results ==
=== Olympic Games ===
- Munich 1972:
  - (silver) Silver kilomètre

=== World championships ===
- Besançon 1980:
  - Keirin
- Brno 1981:
  - Keirin
  - (silver) Silver, points
- Leicester 1982:
  - (silver) Silver, keirin
- Zurich 1983:
  - (silver) Silver, keirin
- Bassano del Grappa 1985:
  - (silver) Silver, Motor-paced
- Vienna 1987:
  - (silver) Silver, motor-paced
- Ghent 1988:
  - Motor-paced
- Maebashi 1990:
  - (bronze) Bronze, motor-paced
  - (bronze) Bronze, points
- Stuttgart 1991:
  - Motor-paced

=== Six-days ===
- Nouméa: 1972 with Malcom Hill
- Sydney: 1974 with Frank Atkins
- Ghent: 1976, 1979, 1982 with Don Allan, 1986 with Tony Doyle, 1987, 1994 with Etienne De Wilde, 1990 with Roland Günther
- Münster: 1977, 1980 with Don Allan, 1988 with Tony Doyle
- Rotterdam: 1977, 1978, 1985 with René Pijnen, 1981 with Don Allan, 1986 with Francesco Moser, 1987 with Pierangelo Bincoletto, 1988 with Tony Doyle
- Antwerp: 1978 with Freddy Maertens, 1987 with Etienne De Wilde
- London: 1978, 1980 with Don Allan
- Copenhagen: 1978 with Don Allan, 1986, 1987 with Tony Doyle, 1989, 1992 with Urs Freuler, 1990, 1991 with Jens Veggerby, 1995 with Jimmi Madsen
- Herning: 1978, 1982 with Don Allan
- Bremen: 1979 with René Pijnen, 1987 with Dietrich Thurau, 1988 with Tony Doyle, 1990 with Roland Günther, 1994 with Andreas Kappes
- Maastricht: 1979 with Don Allan, 1984 with René Pijnen, 1985, 1987 with Tony Doyle
- Hannover: 1980 with Don Allan
- Cologne: 1980 with René Pijnen, 1985 with Dietrich Thurau, 1989 with Tony Doyle
- Munich: 1980, 1981 with Don Allan, 1986 with Dietrich Thurau, 1988, 1990 with Tony Doyle
- Grenoble: 1980 with Bernard Thévenet, 1989 with Gilbert Duclos-Lassalle
- Dortmund: 1982 with Henry Rinklin, 1983, 1986, 1988 with Tony Doyle, 1987 with Roman Hermann, 1991, 1995 with Rolf Aldag
- Berlin: 1983, 1986, 1988 with Tony Doyle, 1984 with Horst Schütz, 1985 with Hans-Henrik Ørsted
- Bassano del Grappa: 1986 with Roberto Amadio and Francesco Moser, 1988 with Francesco Moser, 1989 with Adriano Baffi
- Launceston: 1986 with Tony Doyle
- Paris: 1986 with Bernard Vallet, 1988 with Tony Doyle
- Stuttgart: 1989 with Uwe Bolten, 1992 with Pierangelo Bincoletto, 1995 with Etienne De Wilde
- Buenos Aires: 1993 with Marcelo Alexandre
- Nouméa: 2000 with Graeme Brown

=== European championships ===
- Omnium 1978, 1979, 1984, 1985, 1986, 1988
- Derny 1985, 1986, 1990
- Motor-paced 1988
- Madison 1979 with Don Allan, 1988 with Tony Doyle

== Honours ==
Clark received a Medal of the Order of Australia in 1986 and was inducted into the Sport Australia Hall of Fame in 1987. He received an Australian Sports Medal and a Centenary Medal in 2001.
