= Horst Oldenburg =

German cyclist

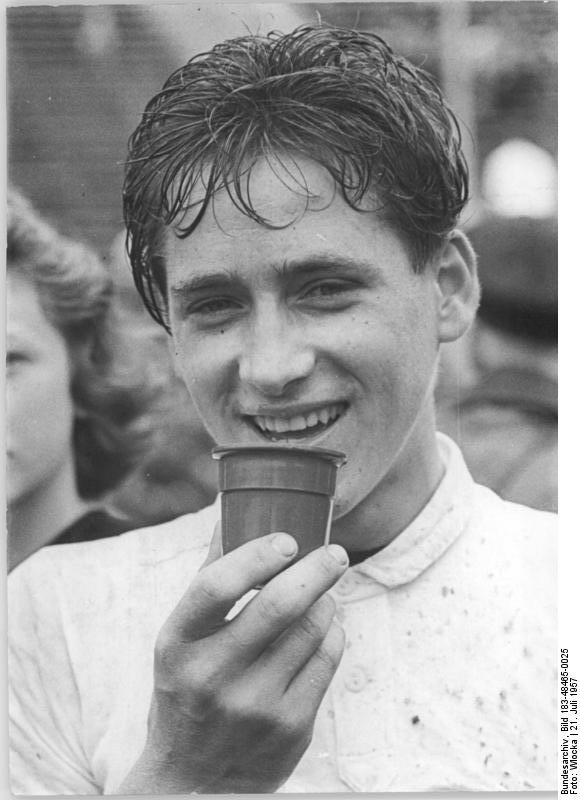

Personal information
- Born: 17 October 1939 (age 86)

Cycling career
- Sport: Cycling
- Role: Rider

Horst Oldenburg (born 17 October 1939) is a German former racing cyclist. He rode in the 1961 Tour de France.
