= Albert Fritz (cyclist) =

German racing cyclist (1947–2019)

Personal information
- Born: 30 May 1947
- Died: 1 September 2019 (aged 72)

Cycling career
- Sport: Cycling
- Role: Rider

Albert Fritz (30 May 1947 – 1 September 2019) was a German racing cyclist. He rode in the 1971 Tour de France.
