= Freddy Eugen =

Danish cyclist

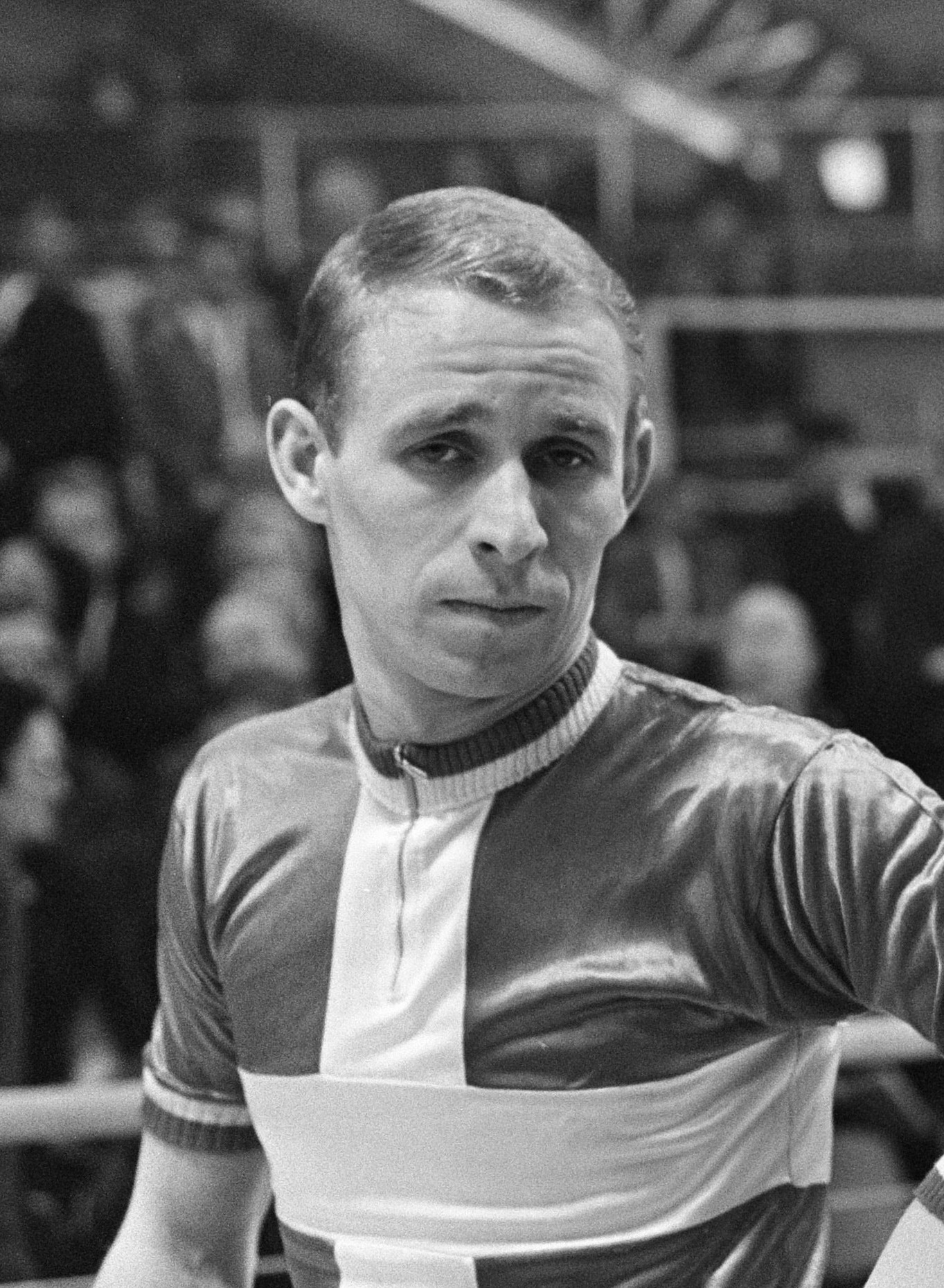
- Freddy Eugen in 1966

Personal information
- Born: 4 February 1941 Copenhagen, Denmark
- Died: 8 June 2018 (aged 77)

Sport
- Sport: Cycling
Medal record
Representing Denmark
Bronze medal – third place	1967	Madison
Silver medal – second place	1968	Madison

Freddy Eugen (4 February 1941 – 8 June 2018) was a Danish cyclist who was active between 1961 and 1969 on the road and track. On track he won two European medals in the madison event in 1967 and 1968. He also won 9 six-day races out of 95 starts, including the Six Days of Amsterdam (1967). On the road he won one stage of the Tour de Suisse (1963).
