= Alain van Lancker =

French cyclist

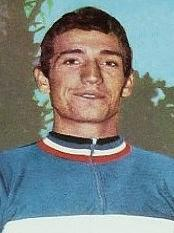
- Alain van Lancker, 1971

Personal information
- Born: 15 May 1947 (age 79) Paris, France

Cycling career
- Sport: Cycling

Alain van Lancker (born 15 May 1947) is a French former cyclist. He competed in the team pursuit at the 1968 Summer Olympics.
