= Jimmi Madsen =

Danish cyclist (born 1969)

Personal information
- Born: 4 January 1969 (age 57) Copenhagen, Denmark
- Height: 183 cm (6 ft 0 in)
- Weight: 72 kg (159 lb)

Cycling career
- Sport: Cycling
- Disciplines: Road and track
- Rider type: Classics specialist (road); Endurance (track)

Professional teams
- 1993–1995: Trumf
- 1998–1999: Acceptcard Pro Cycling
- 2000–2001: Team Bornholm
- 2002–2004: CSC–Tiscali
Medal record
Men's track cycling
Representing Denmark
Olympic Games
Bronze medal – third place	1992 Barcelona	Team pursuit
World Championships
Bronze medal – third place	1993 Hamar	Team pursuit

Jimmi Madsen (born 4 January 1969) is a Danish former cyclist who raced professionally from 1993 to 2004. He rode for Denmark on the track in four Olympic Games: 1988, 1992, 1996 and 2000. He won the bronze medal in the Men's team pursuit in the 1992 Summer Olympics. Madsen was also part of the Danish squad that took the bronze in the team pursuit at the 1993 UCI Track Cycling World Championships. He was a three-time European track champion, winning the European madison title in 1996 and 1997 alongside Jens Veggerby, and a European Derny championship in 2000. Madsen also won ten six-day races during his career.
