= Jens Veggerby =

Danish cyclist (born 1962)

Personal information
- Born: 20 October 1962 (age 63) Copenhagen, Denmark

Sport
- Sport: Cycling
Medal record
Representing Denmark
Motor-paced World Championships
Silver medal – second place	1992 Valencia	Professionals
Gold medal – first place	1993 Hamar	Professionals

Jens Veggerby (born 20 October 1962) is a Danish retired cyclist. During his professional career that spanned 15 years from 1984 to 1999 he competed in 89 six-day races and won 13 of them: in Copenhagen (1989, 1991, 1993 and 1997), Antwerp (1992 and 1994), Ghent (1992), Stuttgart (1994 and 1996), Herning (1995 and 1997), Berlin (1997) and Bremen (1998).

He was also a successful motor-paced cyclist – he won the UCI Motor-paced World Championships in 1993 and finished in second place in 1992. He also won the European championships in 1990, 1996 and 1997.

Since the 2000s Veggerby has run an art gallery in Copenhagen. In April 2011 he was fined 500,000 DKK (ca. 67,000 euro) for smuggling 2 million DKK (ca. 270,000 euro) in November 2008 from Monaco to Denmark for his business partner Stein Bagger. Veggerby said he was unaware that it is illegal to bring more than 10,000 euro (75,000 DKK) in or out of Denmark without informing the authorities.
