= Horst Schütz =

German cyclist

Personal information
- Born: 8 May 1951 (age 75) Kandel, West Germany

Sport
- Sport: Cycling
Medal record
Representing West Germany
UCI Motor-paced World Championships
| Gold medal – first place | 1984 1984 Barcelona | Professionals |

Horst Schütz (born 8 May 1951 in Kandel) is a retired German cyclist who won the UCI Motor-paced World Championships in 1984.

== Background ==
Schütz was a versatile cyclist. In 1975, he won two national titles among amateurs in madison and in team time trial. In 1976, he turned professional and won a national title in the sprint. During his career, he took part in 126 six-day races and won three: in 1980 in Zurich, in 1981 in Hanover, and in 1984 in Berlin. Apart from the world title in motor-paced racing in 1984, he finished second nationally in this discipline in 1984 and 1985, and then retired from cycling.
