= René Pijnen =

Dutch cyclist (born 1946)

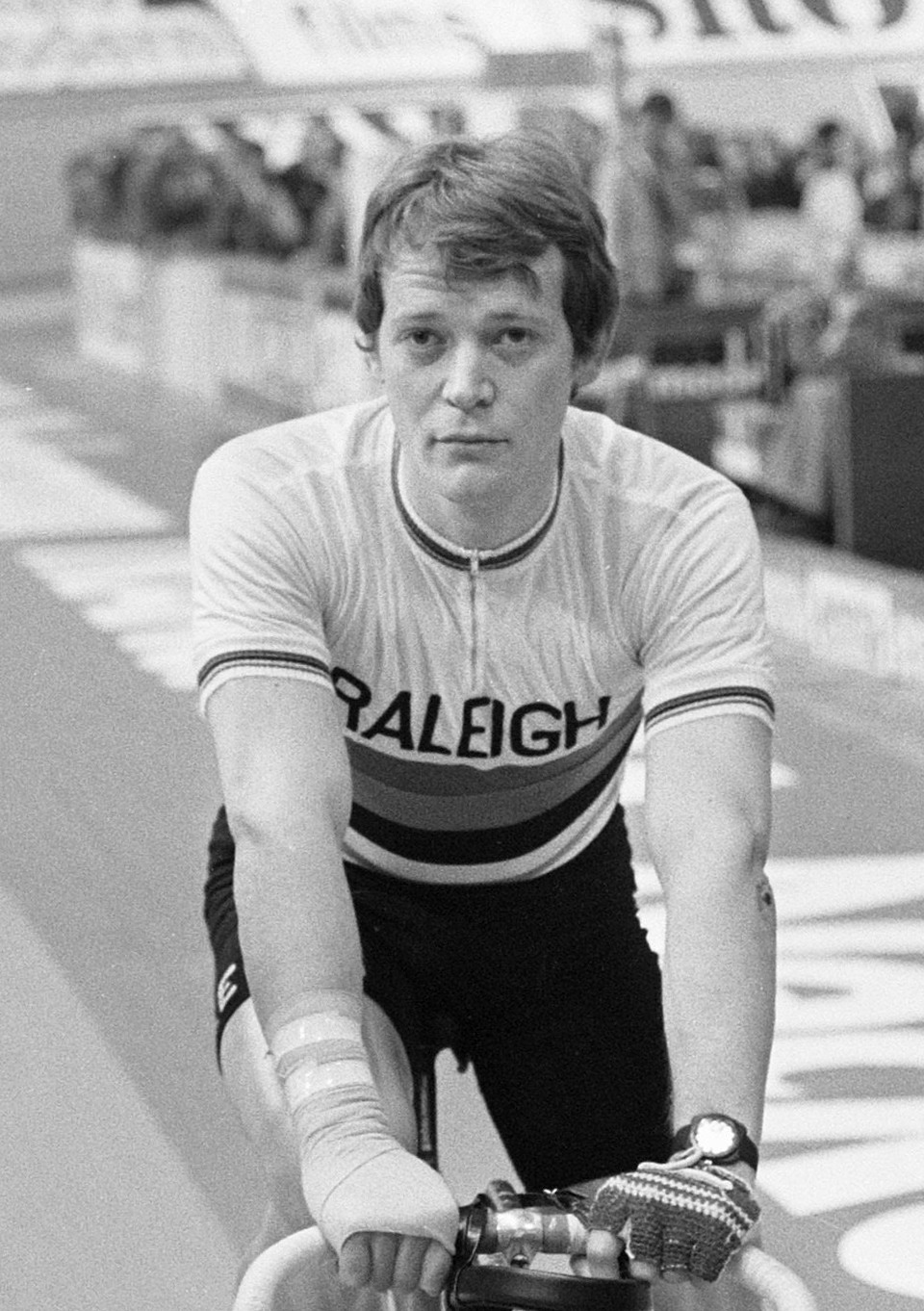
- Pijnen in 1975

Personal information
- Full name: Marinus Augustinus Josephus Pijnen
- Nickname: René
- Born: 3 September 1946 (age 80) Woensdrecht, Netherlands
- Height: 1.75 m (5 ft 9 in)
- Weight: 72 kg (159 lb)

Cycling career
- Sport: Cycling
- Current team: Retired
- Disciplines: Track & Road
- Role: Rider

Major wins
- Grand Tours Vuelta a España 4 individual stages (1971, 1972)
Medal record
Representing the Netherlands
Men's road bicycle racing
Olympic Games
Gold medal – first place	1968 Mexico City	Team time trial
UCI Road World Championships
Bronze medal – third place	1967 Heerlen	Amateur road race
UCI Track Cycling World Championships
Silver medal – second place	1973 San Sebastian	Individual pursuit
Bronze medal – third place	1974 Montreal	Individual pursuit

Marinus "René" Augustinus Josephus Pijnen (born 3 September 1946) is a Dutch former racing cyclist.

He became Olympic champion in the 100 km team time-trial in the 1968 Summer Olympics with Joop Zoetemelk, Fedor den Hertog and Jan Krekels; he finished fifth in the individual road race.

== Professional career ==
A professional from 1969 to 1987, Pijnen was a capable track cyclist, winning the European madison championship six times, (a record he shares with Patrick Sercu). He also won 72 six-day races out of 233 starts, with numerous partners. He was also a great time trialist, winning several. He won four stages of the Vuelta a España, three of those in the 1971 Vuelta a España, which he led for 10 days.

Pijnen rode on the road with TI–Raleigh, managed by another Dutch track specialist, Peter Post, but he said the length of road races bored him, and that he frequently found himself looking at his watch to see how much longer he would have to ride.

== After cycling ==
After retiring, he ran a hotel in Bergen op Zoom, the North Brabant province where he was born. This was in addition to several other ventures he had started during his cycling career.

== Major results ==
1967
3rd Road race, UCI Amateur Road World Championships
3rd Ronde van Overijssel
4th Overall Tour de Namur

1st Stage 2

9th Overall Flèche du Sud

1st Stages 1 & 4

1968
Olympic Games

1st Team time trial
5th Road race

1969
1st Overall Tour du Nord
1st Nationale Sluitingsprijs
Tour de Luxembourg

1st Stages 1b (TTT), 2 & 4

4th Trofeo Baracchi (with Gerben Karstens)
5th Overall Paris–Luxembourg
6th Overall Four Days of Dunkirk
6th Milan–San Remo
1970
2nd Paris–Tours
3rd Overall Tour de Luxembourg
10th Overall Vuelta a Andalucía
Vuelta a España

Held after Stages 1–8b

1971
Vuelta a España

1st Prologue, Stages 5 & 17b (ITT)
Held after Prologue, Stages 1–3 & 5–8

1st Stage 4 Grand Prix du Midi Libre
8th Overall Tour de la Nouvelle-France

1st Stage 2

1972
1st Overall Grand Prix de Fourmies

1st Stage 1 (ITT)

Vuelta a España

1st Prologue
Held after Prologue

1st Stage 4 Tour du Nord
1973
3rd Overall Tour of Belgium
5th Overall Four Days of Dunkirk

1st Prologue

10th Bordeaux–Paris
1974
3rd Dwars door België
5th Overall Tour of Belgium
6th Nokere Koerse
7th Grand Prix de Monaco
8th Bruxelles–Meulebeke
10th Omloop der Beide Vlaanderen
1975
3rd Bruxelles–Meulebeke
6th Overall Four Days of Dunkirk
8th Paris–Tours
1982
7th Omloop van de Vlaamse Scheldeboorden

== See also ==
- List of Dutch Olympic cyclists
