= Six Days of Herning =

Cycling race

Race details
- Date: December, 90s editions in October
- Region: Herning, Denmark
- Local name(s): Seksdagesløbet i Herning (in Danish)
- Discipline: Track
- Type: Six-day racing

History
- First edition: 1974
- Editions: 14
- Final edition: 1998
- First winner: Leo Duyndam (NED); Ole Ritter (DEN)
- Most wins: Gert Frank (DEN) (5 wins)
- Final winner: Kurt Betschart (SUI); Bruno Risi (SUI)

The Six Days of Herning was a six-day track cycling race held annually in the Messecenter Herning, Denmark.

The first Six Days of Herning, contested in 1974, were won by Léo Duyndam and Ole Ritter. Fourteen editions took place: 10 from 1974 to 1983 and 4 from 1995 to 1998.

Gert Frank holds the record for victories there with 5 successes. After several podium finishes in the 70s and 80s, Australian Danny Clark still finished third in 1996 at the age of 45.

== Winners ==
Year	Winner	Second	Third
1974	(Netherlands) Leo Duyndam (Denmark) Ole Ritter	(Germany) Klaus Bugdahl (Germany) Dieter Kemper	(Belgium) Ferdinand Bracke (Belgium) Julien Stevens
1975	(Netherlands) Leo Duyndam (Denmark) Ole Ritter	(Germany) Klaus Bugdahl (Germany) Wolfgang Schulze	(Australia) Graeme Gilmore (Germany) Dieter Kemper
1976	(Germany) Albert Fritz (Germany) Wilfried Peffgen	(Australia) Donald Allan (Australia) Danny Clark	(Denmark) Gert Frank (Denmark) Ole Ritter
1977	(Denmark) Gert Frank (Netherlands) René Pijnen	(Australia) Donald Allan (Australia) Danny Clark	(Belgium) Patrick Sercu (Denmark) Ole Ritter
1978	(Australia) Donald Allan (Australia) Danny Clark	(Denmark) Gert Frank (Netherlands) René Pijnen	(Belgium) Patrick Sercu (Denmark) Niels Fredborg
1979	(Denmark) Gert Frank (Netherlands) René Pijnen	(Australia) Donald Allan (Australia) Danny Clark	(Germany) Wilfried Peffgen (Denmark) Kim Gunnar Svendsen
1980	(Denmark) Gert Frank (Belgium) Patrick Sercu	(Australia) Donald Allan (Australia) Danny Clark	(Germany) Horst Schütz (Liechtenstein) Roman Hermann
1981	(Denmark) Gert Frank (Denmark) Hans-Henrik Ørsted	(Australia) Donald Allan (Australia) Danny Clark	(Germany) Wilfried Peffgen (Denmark) Kim Gunnar Svendsen
1982	(Australia) Donald Allan (Australia) Danny Clark	(Netherlands) René Pijnen (Belgium) Patrick Sercu	(Denmark) Gert Frank (Denmark) Hans-Henrik Ørsted
1983	(Denmark) Gert Frank (Denmark) Hans-Henrik Ørsted	(Denmark) Jørgen Marcussen (Netherlands) René Pijnen	(Germany) Josef Kristen (Germany) Henry Rinklin
1984-1994	No editions		
1995	(Denmark) Jimmi Madsen (Denmark) Jens Veggerby	(Switzerland) Urs Freuler (Denmark) Bjarne Riis	(Switzerland) Kurt Betschart (Switzerland) Bruno Risi
1996	(Italy) Silvio Martinello (Denmark) Bjarne Riis	(Denmark) Jimmi Madsen (Denmark) Jens Veggerby	(Australia) Danny Clark (Denmark) Michael Sandstöd
1997	(Denmark) Jimmi Madsen (Denmark) Jens Veggerby	(Switzerland) Kurt Betschart (Switzerland) Bruno Risi	(Italy) Silvio Martinello (Denmark) Bjarne Riis
1998	(Switzerland) Kurt Betschart (Switzerland) Bruno Risi	(Denmark) Jimmi Madsen (Denmark) Rolf Sørensen	(Italy) Silvio Martinello (Denmark) Jesper Skibby
