= Six Days of Groningen =

Cycling race

Race details
- Region: Groningen, Netherlands
- Local name(s): Groninger zesdaagse (in Dutch)
- Discipline: Track
- Type: Six-day racing

History
- First edition: 1970
- Editions: 4
- Final edition: 1979
- First winner: Jan Janssen (NED); Peter Post (NED)
- Most wins: Klaus Bugdahl (FRG); Dieter Kemper (FRG) (2 wins)
- Final winner: Wilfried Peffgen (FRG); René Pijnen (NED)

The Six Days of Groningen was a short-lived six-day track cycling race held annually in Groningen, Netherlands.

It was contested in the Martinihal Groningen from 1970 to 1972. After 2 successful editions, the public interest for the 1972 Six Days became so poor that the financial balance was negative.

In 1979, the race was organized again as part of an event Topsport' 79 (which also included basketball and athletics), but once more the public interest was minimal. It turned out to be the final edition.

== Winners ==
Year	Winner	Second	Third
1970	(Netherlands) Jan Janssen (Netherlands) Peter Post	(West Germany) Klaus Bugdahl (West Germany) Dieter Kemper	(Australia) Graeme Gilmore (West Germany) Sigi Renz
1971	(West Germany) Klaus Bugdahl (West Germany) Dieter Kemper	(Switzerland) Fritz Pfenninger (Netherlands) Peter Post	(Netherlands) Leo Duyndam (Netherlands) René Pijnen
1972	(West Germany) Klaus Bugdahl (West Germany) Dieter Kemper	(Australia) Graeme Gilmore (Belgium) Theo Verschueren	(Netherlands) René Pijnen (Belgium) Norbert Seeuws
1973-1978	No editions		
1979	(West Germany) Wilfried Peffgen (Netherlands) René Pijnen	(West Germany) Albert Fritz (Belgium) Patrick Sercu	(Liechtenstein) Roman Hermann (West Germany) Horst Schütz
