= Six Days of Madrid =

Race details
- Region: Madrid, Spain
- Discipline: Track
- Type: Six-day racing

History
- First edition: 1960
- Editions: 14
- Final edition: 1986

The Six Days of Madrid is a former six-day cycling event, held in Madrid, Spain. Fourteen editions of the event were held between 1960 and 1986.

== Winners ==
Edition	Winners	Second	Third
1960	Ronald Murray (AUS); John Tressider (AUS)	Miguel Poblet (ESP); Luis Peñalver Escribano (ESP)	Raymond Impanis (BEL); Edgard Sorgeloos (BEL)
1961	Oscar Plattner (SUI); Armin von Büren (SUI)	Jorge Bátiz (ARG); Miguel Poblet (ESP)	Leandro Faggin (ITA); Giuseppe Ogna (ITA)
1962	Miguel Bover (ESP); Miguel Poblet (ESP)	Leandro Faggin (ITA); Ferdinando Terruzzi (ITA)	Tom Simpson (GBR); John Tressider (AUS)
1963	Joseph De Bakker (BEL); Rik Van Steenbergen (BEL)	Jorge Bátiz (ARG); Guillem Timoner (ESP)	Julio San Emeterio (ESP); Francisco Tortellà (ESP)
1964	Federico Bahamontes (ESP); Rik Van Steenbergen (BEL)	Francisco Tortellà (ESP); Guillermo Timoner (ESP)	Willy Altig (FRG); Klaus Bugdahl (FRG)
1965	Romain De Loof (BEL); Rik Van Steenbergen (BEL)	Francisco Tortellà (ESP); José María Errandonea (ESP)	Lucien Gillen (LUX); Rafael Carrasco (ESP)
1966	Walter Godefroot (BEL); Emile Severeyns (BEL)	Giuseppe Beghetto (ITA); Leandro Faggin (ITA)	José López Rodríguez (ESP); Domingo Perurena (ESP)
1967	Jan Janssen (NED); Gerard Koel (NED)	José López Rodríguez (ESP); Arthur Decabooter (BEL)	Ron Baensch (AUS); Sid Patterson (AUS)
1968– 1969	Not raced		
1970	José López Rodríguez (ESP); Domingo Perurena (ESP)	Fritz Pfenninger (SUI); Alain Van Lancker (FRA)	Jan Janssen (NED); Gerard Koel (NED)
1971– 1980	Not raced		
1981	Donald Allan (AUS); Faustino Rupérez (ESP)	Miguel María Lasa (ESP); Wilfried Peffgen (FRG)	Willy Debosscher (BEL); Constant Tourné (BEL)
1982	Gert Frank (DEN); Avelino Perea (ESP)	Jan Raas (NED); Leo van Vliet (NED)	Noël Dejonckheere (NED); Josef Kristen (FRG)
1983	René Pijnen (NED); Enrique Martínez Heredia (ESP)	Joop Zoetemelk (NED); Günther Schumacher (FRG)	Willy Debosscher (BEL); Patrick Moerlen (SUI)
1984– 1985	Not raced		
1986 (I)	Gerrie Knetemann (NED); José Luis Navarro (ESP)	Pierangelo Bincoletto (ITA); Bruno Vicino (ITA)	Alain Bondue (FRA); Peter Pieters (NED)
1986 (II)	Roman Hermann (LIE); Sigmund Hermann (LIE)	René Pijnen (NED); Pello Ruiz Cabestany (ESP)	Constant Tourné (BEL); Etienne De Wilde (BEL)
