= Six Days of Maastricht =

Cycling race

Race details
- Region: Maastricht, Netherlands
- Local name(s): Zesdaagse van Maastricht (in Dutch)
- Discipline: Track
- Type: Six-day racing

History
- First edition: 1976
- Editions: 13
- Final edition: 2006
- First winner: Patrick Sercu (BEL); Graeme Gilmore (AUS)
- Most wins: René Pijnen (NED) (6 wins)
- Final winner: Franco Marvulli (SUI); Bruno Risi (SUI)

The Six Days of Maastricht was a six-day track cycling race held annually in Maastricht, Netherlands.

It was contested in the MECC Maastricht from 1976 to 1987. In 2006, the event was organized again, but the 2007 edition had to be cancelled due to financial difficulties.

The competition's roll of honor includes victories by Eddy Merckx and Danny Clark. The record of victories, however, belongs to René Pijnen.

== Winners ==
| Year | Winner | Second | Third |
|---|---|---|---|
| 1976 | (Australia) Graeme Gilmore (Belgium) Patrick Sercu | (West Germany) Günther Haritz (Netherlands) René Pijnen | (West Germany) Albert Fritz (West Germany) Wilfried Peffgen |
| 1977 | (Belgium) Eddy Merckx (Belgium) Patrick Sercu | (Netherlands) Gerben Karstens (Netherlands) René Pijnen | (Australia) Donald Allan (Australia) Danny Clark |
| 1978 | (Netherlands) Gerrie Knetemann (Netherlands) René Pijnen | (West Germany) Albert Fritz (West Germany) Wilfried Peffgen | (Australia) Danny Clark (Netherlands) Gerben Karstens |
| 1979 | (Australia) Donald Allan (Australia) Danny Clark | (Netherlands) René Pijnen (Netherlands) Jan Raas | (West Germany) Albert Fritz (Belgium) Patrick Sercu |
| 1980 | (Netherlands) Gerrie Knetemann (Netherlands) René Pijnen | (West Germany) Albert Fritz (Belgium) Patrick Sercu | (Denmark) Gert Frank (Liechtenstein) Roman Hermann |
| 1981 | (Netherlands) René Pijnen (Netherlands) Ad Wijnands | (West Germany) Albert Fritz (West Germany) Günther Schumacher | (West Germany) Udo Hempel (West Germany) Josef Kristen |
| 1982 | (Netherlands) René Pijnen (Netherlands) Ad Wijnands | (West Germany) Albert Fritz (West Germany) Wilfried Peffgen | (Netherlands) Gerrie Knetemann (Belgium) Patrick Sercu |
| 1983 | (West Germany) Albert Fritz (West Germany) Dietrich Thurau | (West Germany) Josef Kristen (Netherlands) René Pijnen | (Switzerland) Robert Dill-Bundi (Denmark) Gert Frank |
| 1984 | (Australia) Danny Clark (Netherlands) René Pijnen | (Denmark) Gert Frank (West Germany) Horst Schütz | (West Germany) Albert Fritz (West Germany) Dietrich Thurau |
| 1985 | (Australia) Danny Clark (United Kingdom) Anthony Doyle | (Denmark) Gert Frank (Netherlands) René Pijnen | (Liechtenstein) Roman Hermann (Netherlands) Gerrie Knetemann |
| 1986 | (Netherlands) René Pijnen (West Germany) Dietrich Thurau | (Australia) Danny Clark (United Kingdom) Anthony Doyle | (Liechtenstein) Roman Hermann (West Germany) Josef Kristen |
| 1987 | (Australia) Danny Clark (United Kingdom) Anthony Doyle | (Belgium) Etienne De Wilde (Netherlands) Teun van Vliet | (Liechtenstein) Roman Hermann (Netherlands) Joop Zoetemelk |
| 1988-2005 | No edition | | |
| 2006 | (Switzerland) Franco Marvulli (Switzerland) Bruno Risi | (Belgium) Iljo Keisse (Italy) Marco Villa | (Netherlands) Danny Stam (Netherlands) Peter Schep |
