= Six Days of Hanover =

Race details
- Region: Hanover, Germany
- Local name(s): Sechstagerennen von Hannover (in German)
- Discipline: Track
- Type: Six-day racing

History
- First edition: 1913
- Editions: 10
- Final edition: 1981
- First winner: Willy Lorenz (GER); Karl Saldow (GER)
- Most wins: Émile Carrara (FRA) (2)
- Final winner: Roman Hermann (LIE); Horst Schütz (FRG)

The Six Days of Hanover was a six-day track cycling race held annually in Hanover, Germany until 1981.

Émile Carrara won in two editions.

In 2011, 30 years after the last edition, an attempt to reorganize the event failed.

== Winners ==
Year	Winner	Second	Third
1913	(Germany) Willy Lorenz (Germany) Karl Saldow	(Germany) Erich Aberger (Germany) Willy Techmer	(Germany) Willy Arend (Germany) Karl Ehlert
1914-1949	no edition		
1950 (1)	(Luxembourg) Gustav Kilian (West Germany) Heinz Vopel	(Italy) Severino Rigoni (Italy) Ferdinando Terruzzi	(West Germany) Harry Saager (West Germany) Heinrich Schwarzer
1950 (2)	(Switzerland) Hugo Koblet (Switzerland) Armin von Büren	(Luxembourg) Gustav Kilian (Switzerland) Jean Roth	(West Germany) Harry Saager (France) Guy Lapebie
1951 (1)	(France) Émile Carrara (France) Guy Lapebie	(Italy) Severino Rigoni (Italy) Ferdinando Terruzzi	(Luxembourg) Gustav Kilian (West Germany) Heinz Vöpel
1951 (2)	(West Germany) Ludwig Hörmann (West Germany) Jean Schorn	(West Germany) Theo Intra (Switzerland) Jean Roth	(Switzerland) Ferdi Kübler (West Germany) Harry Saager
1952	(France) Émile Carrara (France) Georges Senfftleben	(Luxembourg) Lucien Gillen (Germany) Gustav Kilian	(France) Dominique Forlini (West Germany) Hans Preiskeit
1953	(Switzerland) Oskar Plattner (Germany) Hans Preiskeit	(Belgium) Lucien Acou (Netherlands) Arie van Vliet	(West Germany) Waldemar Knoke (Switzerland) Armin von Büren
1954-1978	no edition		
1979	(West Germany) Albert Fritz (Belgium) Patrick Sercu	(West Germany) Günther Schumacher (Netherlands) René Pijnen	(Germany) Wilfried Peffgen (Germany) Horst Schütz
1980	(Australia) Donald Allan (Australia) Danny Clark	(West Germany) Dietrich Thurau (Belgium) Patrick Sercu	(West Germany) Albert Fritz (West Germany) Günther Schumacher
1981	(Liechtenstein) Roman Hermann (West Germany) Horst Schütz	(Denmark) Gert Frank (Belgium) Patrick Sercu	(West Germany) Udo Hempel (West Germany) Günther Schumacher
