= Patrick Sercu =

Belgian cyclist (1944–2019)

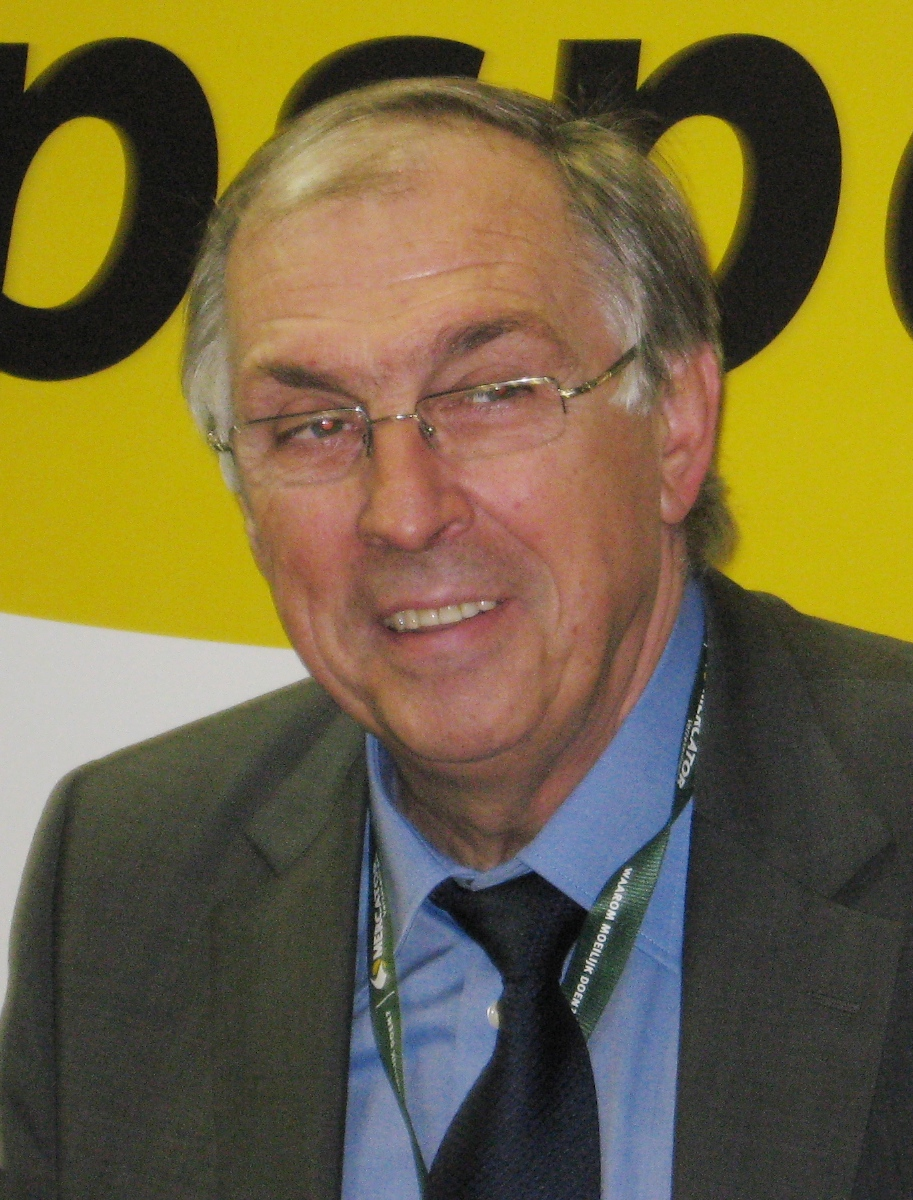
- Sercu in 2008

Personal information
- Full name: Patrick Sercu
- Nickname: Emperor of the oval
- Born: 27 June 1944 Roeselare, West Flanders, Belgium
- Died: 19 April 2019 (aged 74) Roeselare, West Flanders, Belgium
- Height: 1.80 m (5 ft 11 in)
- Weight: 76 kg (168 lb)

Cycling career
- Sport: Cycling
- Disciplines: Track and road
- Role: Rider
- Rider type: Sprinter

Professional teams
- 1964: Bertin–Porter 39–Milremo
- 1964–1966: Solo–Superia
- 1967: Flandria–DeClerckx
- 1968–1969: Faemino–Faema
- 1970–1972: Dreher
- 1973–1976: Brooklyn
- 1977: Fiat France
- 1978–1979: Marc Zeepcentrale–Superia
- 1980: Marc–VRD
- 1981–1902: IWC–Imex
- 1983: Imex–Neuhaus

Major wins
- Grand Tours Tour de France Points classification (1974) 6 individual stages (1974, 1977) Giro d'Italia 13 individual stages (1970, 1971, 1973, 1974, 1975, 1976) Stage races Giro di Sardegna (1970) One-day races and Classics Kampioenschap van Vlaanderen (1972) Elfstedenronde (1973) Halle–Ingooigem (1974) Dwars door West-Vlaanderen (1974) Kuurne–Brussels–Kuurne (1977) Track Championships National Track Championships Madison (1966, 1967, 1968, 1969, 1970, 1971, 1972, 1973, 1974, 1975, 1976, 1977) Omnium (1965, 1966, 1967, 1968, 1971, 1972, 1973, 1974, 1975, 1976, 1977, 1978, 1979, 1982) Sprint (1965, 1967, 1968, 1969) Derny (1976) European Track Championships Omnium (1965, 1967, 1968, 1969, 1970, 1971, 1972, 1973, 1976, 1977, 1980) Madison (1969, 1970, 1975, 1977, 1978) Derny (1977) World Track Championships Sprint (1967, 1969)
Medal record
Representing Belgium
Men's track cycling
Olympic Games
Gold medal – first place	1964 Tokyo	1000 m time trial
World Championships
Gold medal – first place	1963 Liege	Amateur's sprint
Gold medal – first place	1967 Amsterdam	Sprint
Gold medal – first place	1969 Antwerpen	Sprint
Silver medal – second place	1965 San Sebastián	Sprint
Silver medal – second place	1968 Rome	Sprint
European Championships
Gold medal – first place	1965 Brussels	Omnium
Gold medal – first place	1967 Gent	Omnium
Gold medal – first place	1968 Gent	Omnium
Gold medal – first place	1969 Gent	Madison
Gold medal – first place	1969 Charleroi	Omnium
Gold medal – first place	1970 Köln	Madison
Gold medal – first place	1970 Gent	Omnium
Gold medal – first place	1971 Brussels	Omnium
Gold medal – first place	1972 Gent	Omnium
Gold medal – first place	1973 Köln	Omnium
Gold medal – first place	1975 Rotterdam	Madison
Gold medal – first place	1976 Rotterdam	Omnium
Gold medal – first place	1977 Kopenhagen	Madison
Gold medal – first place	1977 Antwerp	Omnium
Gold medal – first place	1977 Rotterdam	Derny
Gold medal – first place	1978 Milan	Madison
Gold medal – first place	1980 Gent	Omnium
Gold medal – first place	1982 Gent	Madison
Silver medal – second place	1972 Antwerp	Madison
Silver medal – second place	1978 Rotterdam	Derny
Silver medal – second place	1979 Vienna	Omnium
Silver medal – second place	1980 Vienna	Derny
Bronze medal – third place	1968 Bremen	Madison
Bronze medal – third place	1971 Gent	Madison
Bronze medal – third place	1976 Zürich	Madison
Bronze medal – third place	1979 Kopenhagen	Madison
Bronze medal – third place	1981 Milan	Omnium
Bronze medal – third place	1982 Zürich	Omnium

Patrick Sercu (27 June 1944 – 19 April 2019) was a Belgian cyclist who was active on the road and track between 1961 and 1983. On track, he won the gold medal in the 1 km time trial at the 1964 Summer Olympics, as well as three world titles in the sprint in 1963, 1967 and 1969. On the road, he earned the green jersey in the 1974 Tour de France. Sercu is the record holder for the number of six-day track race victories, having won 88 events out of 223 starts between 1961 and 1983; several of these wins were with cycling great Eddy Merckx. He also won six stages at the Tour de France and eleven stages at the Giro d'Italia.

With 38 national and 15 European championship titles, he is considered as one of the most successful track cyclists ever.

In total, he won no less than 1,206 races, of which 168 road races and 1,038 track races.

== Biography ==
=== Early life ===
At a young age, Patrick Sercu was pushed towards the track by his father Albert, himself a successful rider. "He was afraid I would break down too quickly on the road", Patrick Sercu himself said about that.

With his fast legs, Sercu was also born for explosive work on the track. In 1962, aged 18, he won his first national titles, in the sprint and madison events. At 19, Sercu became world amateur sprint champion in Rocourt, near Liège.

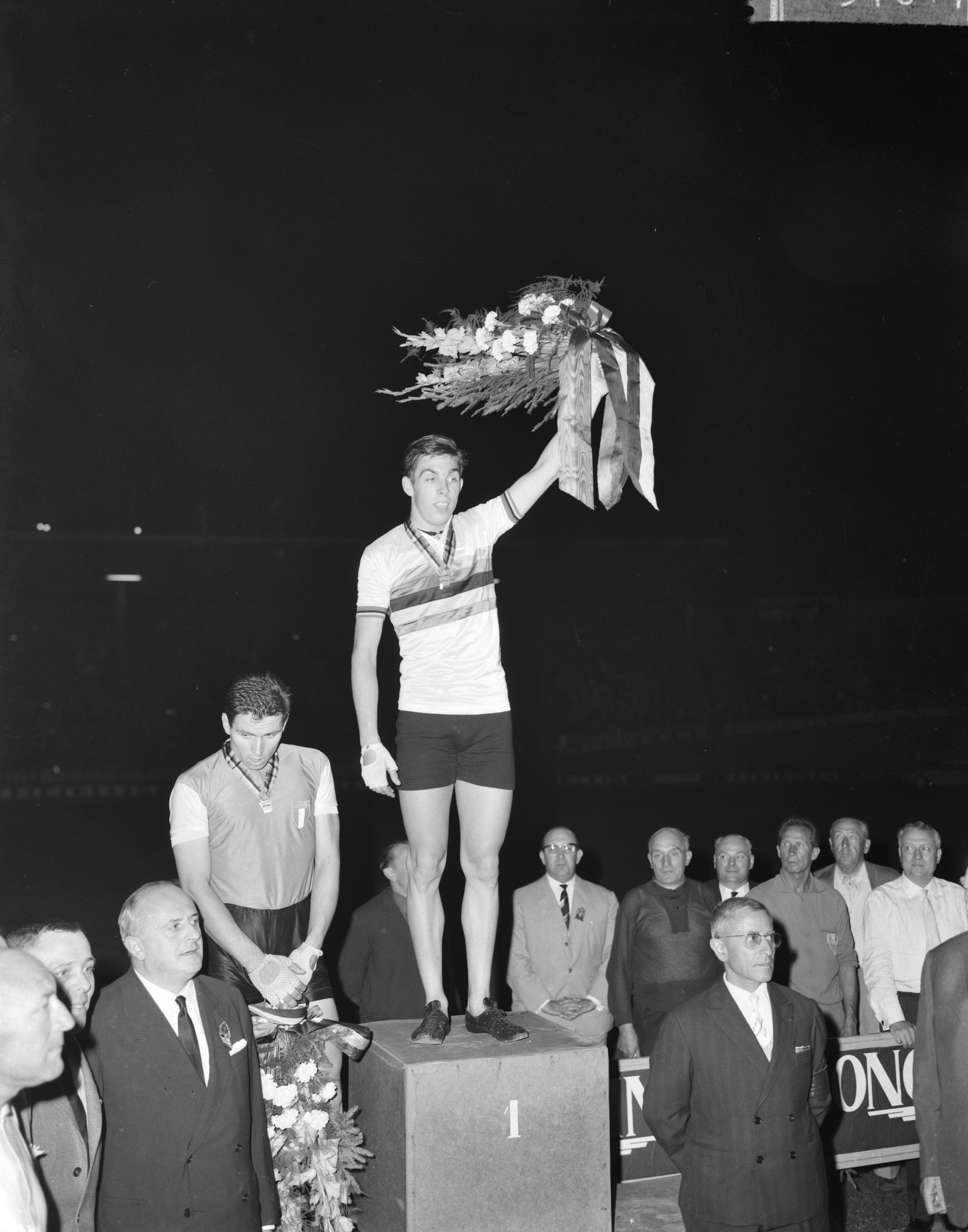
Sercu after winning the 1963 World amateur sprint championship in Rocourt

A year later, the still very young Sercu captured gold at the kilometre in Tokyo, his only participation in the Games as only amateurs were allowed to compete in the cycling events at the time. That year, he was the star attraction at the Manchester Wheelers' Club Race Meet at the Fallowfield track in Manchester.

=== Professional career ===
After the Olympics, professional life and also increasingly the road races beckoned for Sercu. Super team Solo–Superia, which also included Eddy Merckx, Rik Van Looy and Rik Van Steenbergen, brought in the West-Fleming.

While on the road he still lacked power and speed, on the track he was increasingly successful. Between 1965 and 1969, he won two more golds and two more silver medals at the World Sprint Championships, each time after a duel with his Italian rival Giuseppe Beghetto.

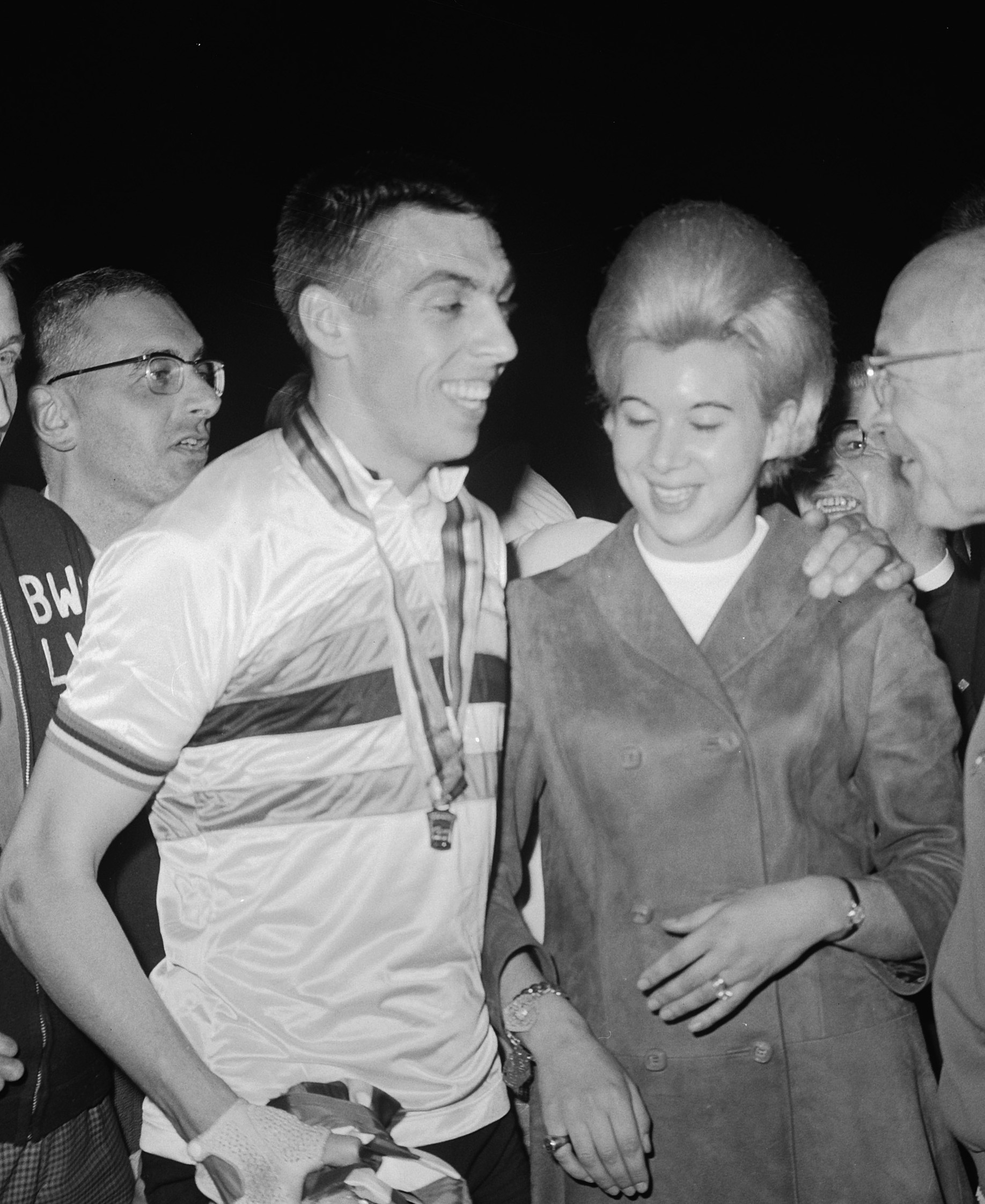
Sercu with wife, after winning the 1967 World Championship Sprint

He was also an instant winner in the Six Days. With Eddy Merckx at his side, he won his first of 11 Six Days in Ghent in 1965. Until the early 1980s, Sercu would remain the uncrowned king of the Six Days.

With 88 final victories, Sercu leads the eternal rankings. "It's Merckx's fault there weren't more", he later said jokingly. After all, Merckx could not ride a full winter programme due to his busy schedule.

Gradually, Sercu began to find his feet on the road as well. In 1970, he rode his first major tour, the Giro, and took his first stage win. Twelve more stage wins in the Italian Tour would follow in the following years.

By the mid-1970s, Sercu had become one of the most renowned sprinters in the peloton. In his first participation in the Tour at the age of 30, he snatched 3 stages as well as the green jersey. Three years later, he would bring his total in the Tour to six stage wins. By then, he had already won the overall classification of another stage race Giro di Sardegna in 1970, and the points classification of the Critérium du Dauphiné and La Méditerranée in 1977.

=== Retirement ===
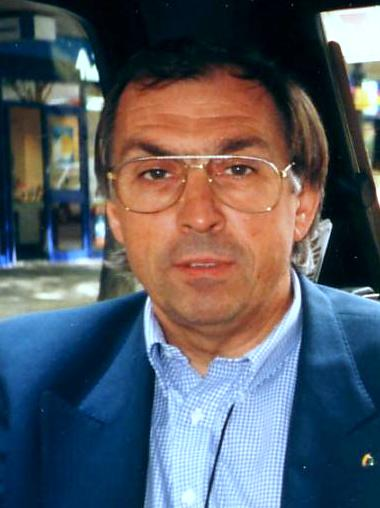
Patrick Sercu in 1998

Patrick Sercu retired from competitions in 1983. He became organizer of six days events and omniums all over the world, and director of the Six Days of Ghent and the former Six Days of Hasselt. After a few years with unstable health, Sercu died on 19 April 2019, aged 74.

== Riding Style ==
Sercu had the quality not only to have a very fast sprint, but he could also maintain that top speed for a long time. He celebrated his most notable success there in the one kilometer time trial, where he often outwitted the stockier, more explosive types in a long sprint. It earned him the world records in the shorter distances. Moreover, his performances often appeared relatively effortless, often to the chagrin of his opponents. With his exceptional recovery ability, he was able to participate in more than ten six-days in a winter season. In the years that he combined the track with the road, he competed in more than 200 races every year.

The six-day combination with Eddy Merckx was a success. Merckx was able to maintain a high, constant pace for a long time, while Sercu often finished it off with his final sprint.

== Major results ==
=== Road ===
1964
1st Gent–Wevelgem Amateur race
1965
1st Criterium Zolder
1966
1st Criterium Bourcefranc
1967
1st Memorial Tom Simpson
1968
1st Omloop van Midden-Vlaanderen
2nd Ronde van Limburg
1969
1st Omloop Leiedal
1st Stage 5 Tirreno–Adriatico
3rd Omloop der Vlaamse Gewesten
1970
Giro d'Italia

1st Stage 5

2nd Coppa Sabatini
2nd Milano–Vignola
2nd Giro di Calabria
2nd Nokere Koerse
3rd Giro della Provincia di Reggio Calabria
3rd Overall Tirreno–Adriatico

1st Stage 5

1st Overall Giro di Sardegna

1st Stage 4

1971
1st Izegem koers
Giro d'Italia

1st Stages 13 & 14

1st Stage 2 Giro di Sardegna
1st Criterium Tortoretto
2nd Coppa Bernocchi
1st Stage 1 Tour de Romandie
1st GP Roeselare
2nd Grote 1-MeiPrijs
2nd Milano–Vignola
2nd Giro di Campania
3rd Sassari-Cagliari
1972
1st Omloop van het Houtland
1st Kampioenschap van Vlaanderen
1st Criterium Lignano
2nd Coppa Bernocchi
2nd Paris–Camembert
1st Stage 3 Tirreno–Adriatico
3rd Overall Giro di Sardegna

1st Stage 6

3rd Sassari-Cagliari
1973
1st Maaslandse Pijl
Giro d'Italia

1st Stage 9

1st Stage 2 Giro di Puglia
1st Elfstedenronde
1st Sassari-Cagliari
2nd Milano–Vignola

1974
Tour de France

1st Points classification
1st StageS 3, 4 and 10

1st Halle–Ingooigem
Giro d'Italia

1st Stages 1, 10 & 12 (ITT), 7 & 15 (ITT)

1st De Kustpijl
1st Dwars door West-Vlaanderen
1st Criterium Rouergue
2nd Giro di Sicilia
2nd Omloop Het Nieuwsblad
5th Overall Giro di Sardegna
1st Stages 2, 3 and 5
1975
1st Izegem Koers
1st Circuit of Dunkirk (fr)
Giro d'Italia

1st Stages 2, 13 and 18

Tour de Romandie

1st Stages 2 and 5

Tirreno–Adriatico

1st Stage 4

1st Dwars door West-Vlaanderen
1st Stage 3 Giro di Sardegna
2nd Omloop Het Nieuwsblad
2nd Milano–Vignola
2nd Grand Prix Cemab (fr)
1976
Giro d'Italia

1st Stages 1, 2 and 11

1st Stage 4 Giro di Puglia
1st Stage 5 Giro di Sardegna
1st Criterium Nantes
3rd Omloop Het Nieuwsblad
1977
Tour de France

1st Stages 8, 9 (TTT), 14 and 15

Critérium du Dauphiné Libéré

1st Points classification
1st Stages 3, 4, 5 and 8

Paris–Nice

1st Stages 8 and 10

1st Kuurne–Brussels–Kuurne
3rd Overall Giro di Sardegna
1st Stages 2 and 3
La Méditerranéenne

1st Points classification
1st Stages 4 and 5

2nd E3 Harelbeke
1978
1st Stage 2 Tour of Belgium
1st Omloop van de Grensstreek
1st Criterium Hank
1979
1st GP Union Dortmund
1st Stage 6 Deutschland Tour
1980
1st Omloop van het Zuidwesten
1st Criterium Mol

=== Track ===
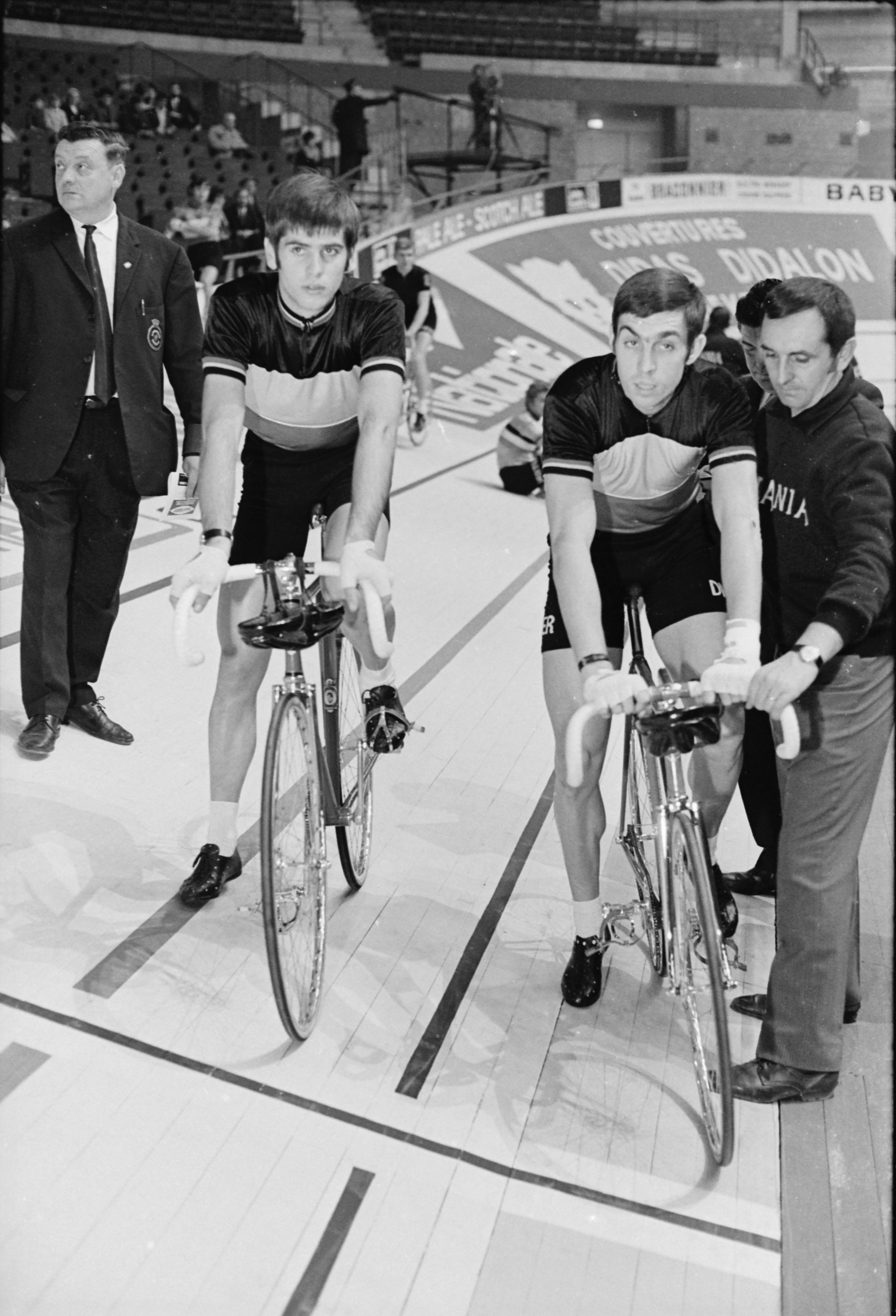
Jean-Pierre Monseré and Patrick Sercu in the 1970 Six Days of Brussels

1962
Belgian National Championships

1st Amateur Sprint

1963
1st Men's Amateur sprint, UCI Track World Championships
Belgian National Championships

1st Amateur Madison (with Romain De Loof)
1st Amateur Sprint
1st Amateur Omnium

1st Brussels Omnium (with Eddy Merckx)
1st Roucourt Sprint
1964
Summer Olympics

1st Men's track time trial

World Record Flying 500 m time trial amateurs (29"66)
World Record 1 km time trial amateurs (1'06"76)
Belgian National Championships

1st Amateur Madison (with Eddy Merckx)
1st Amateur Sprint
1st Amateur Omnium

1st Brussels Omnium (with Eddy Merckx)
1st Cologne Omnium (with Eddy Merckx)
1st Antwerp Omnium (with Eddy Merckx)
1st Forest-Vorst Omnium (with Eddy Merckx)
1965
1st European Track Championships – Omnium
Belgian National Championships

1st Omnium
1st Amateur Madison (with Eddy Merckx)
1st Sprint

2nd Men's sprint, UCI Track World Championships
1st Six Days of Ghent (with Eddy Merckx)
2nd Six Days of Brussels (with Eddy Merckx)
3rd Six Days of Antwerp (with Emile Severeyns and Theo Verschueren)
1966
Belgian National Championships

1st Omnium
1st Madison (with Eddy Merckx)

1st Six Days of Frankfurt (with Klaus Bugdahl)
1st Antwerp Omnium (with Eddy Merckx
1st Rocourt Omnium (with Eddy Merckx
1st Ostend Omnium (with Eddy Merckx
1st Brussels Omnium (with Eddy Merckx
1st Ghent Omnium (with Eddy Merckx, Rik Van Steenbergen and Noël Van Clooster
2nd Six Days of Ghent (with Klaus Bugdahl)
2nd Six Days of Antwerp (with Eddy Merckx and Klaus Bugdahl)
3rd Six Days of Milan (with Leandro Faggin)
3rd Six Days of Zürich (with Klaus Bugdahl)
3rd Six Days of Amsterdam (with Jan Janssen)
1967
1st Men's sprint, UCI Track World Championships
1st European Track Championships – Omnium
World Indoor Record Flying 1 km time trial (1'01"23)
Belgian National Championships

1st Omnium
1st Madison (with Eddy Merckx)
1st Sprint
2nd Derny

1st Six Days of Cologne (with Klaus Bugdahl)
1st Six Days of Ghent (with Eddy Merckx)
1st Six Days of Charleroi (with Ferdinand Bracke)
1st Six Days of Montreal I (with Emile Severeyns)
1st Six Days of Münster (with Klaus Bugdahl)
1st Madison Ostend (with Eddy Merckx)
1st Madison Rocourt (with Eddy Merckx)
2nd Six Days of Antwerp (with Eddy Merckx and Klaus Bugdahl)
2nd Six Days of Dortmund (with Klaus Bugdahl)
2nd Six Days of Berlin II (with Eddy Merckx)
2nd Six Days of Zürich (with Klaus Bugdahl)
2nd Six Days of Milan (with Klaus Bugdahl)
3rd Six Days of Berlin I (with Klaus Bugdahl)
3rd Six Days of Bremen (with Klaus Bugdahl)
3rd Six Days of Frankfurt (with Klaus Bugdahl)
3rd Six Days of Montreal II (with Emile Severeyns)
1968
European Track Championships

1st Omnium
3rd Madison (with Klaus Bugdahl))

Belgian National Championships

1st Omnium
1st Madison (with Eddy Merckx)
1st Sprint

1st Six Days of London (with Peter Post)
1st Six Days of Frankfurt (with Rudi Altig)
1st Six Days of Dortmund (with Rudi Altig)
2nd Men's sprint, UCI Track World Championships
2nd Six Days of Zürich (with Peter Post)
2nd Six Days of Cologne (with Eddy Merckx)
2nd Six Days of Ghent (with Rik Van Looy)
2nd Six Days of Montreal (with Emile Severeyns)
3rd Six Days of Antwerp (with Jan Janssen and Klaus Bugdahl)
3rd Six Days of Charleroi (with Rik Van Looy)
1969
1st Men's sprint, UCI Track World Championships
European Track Championships

1st Omnium
1st Madison (with Peter Post)

Belgian National Championships

1st Madison (with Rik Van Looy)
1st Sprint

1st Six Days of London (with Peter Post)
1st Six Days of Frankfurt (with Peter Post)
1st Six Days of Dortmund (with Peter Post)
1st Six Days of Antwerp (with Rik Van Looy and Peter Post)
1st Six Days of Bremen (with Peter Post)
2nd Six Days of Cologne (with Peter Post)
2nd Six Days of Berlin (with Peter Post)
2nd Six Days of Ghent (with Alain van Lancker)
2nd Six Days of Milan with Eddy Merckx)
2nd Six Days of Montreal (with Emile Severeyns)
3rd Six Days of Zürich (with Alain van Lancker)
1970
European Track Championships

1st Omnium
1st Madison (with Eddy Merckx)

Belgian National Championships

1st Omnium
1st Madison (with Norbert Seeuws)

1st Six Days of London (with Peter Post)
1st Six Days of Cologne (with Peter Post)
1st Six Days of Bremen (with Peter Post)
1st Six Days of Ghent (with Jean-Pierre Monseré)
2nd Six Days of Berlin (with Albert Fritz)
2nd Six Days of Antwerp (with Romain Deloof and Alain van Lancker)
3rd Six Days of Zürich (with Sigi Renz and Jürgen Schneider)
1971
European Track Championships

1st Omnium
3rd Madison (with Graeme Gilmore))

Belgian National Championships

1st Omnium
1st Madison (with Jean-Pierre Monseré)

1st Six Days of London (with Peter Post)
1st Six Days of Ghent (with Roger De Vlaeminck)
1st Six Days of Frankfurt (with Peter Post)
1st Six Days of Berlin (with Peter Post)
1st Six Days of Rotterdam (with Peter Post)
2nd Six Days of Bremen (with Peter Post)
2nd Six Days of Brussels (with Roger De Vlaeminck)
3rd Six Days of Dortmund (with Peter Post)
3rd Six Days of Grenoble (with Ferdinand Bracke)
1972
European Track Championships

1st Omnium
2nd Madison (with Julien Stevens))

World Record 1 km time trial (1'07"35)
Belgian National Championships

1st Omnium
1st Madison (with Roger De Vlaeminck)

1st Six Days of London (with Tony Gowland)
1st Six Days of Ghent (with Julien Stevens)
1st Six Days of Dortmund (with Alain van Lancker)
2nd Six Days of Antwerp (with Rik Van Linden and Alain van Lancker)
2nd Six Days of Milan with Gianni Motta)
2nd Six Days of Bremen (with Peter Post)
3rd Six Days of Munich (with Alain van Lancker)
1973
European Track Championships

1st Omnium

World Outdoor Record Flying 1 km time trial (1' 02" 40)
Belgian National Championships

1st Madison (with Julien Stevens)

1st Six Days of Cologne (with Alain van Lancker)
1st Six Days of Dortmund (with Eddy Merckx)
1st Six Days of Milan with Julien Stevens)
1st Six Days of Ghent (with Graeme Gilmore)
1st Six Days of Grenoble (with Eddy Merckx)
2nd Six Days of London (with Gianni Motta )
2nd Six Days of Rotterdam (with Eddy Merckx)
1974
Belgian National Championships

1st Omnium
1st Madison (with Eddy Merckx)

1st Six Days of London (with René Pijnen)
1st Six Days of Dortmund (with René Pijnen)
1st Six Days of Antwerp (with Eddy Merckx)
2nd Six Days of Cologne (with Wilfried Peffgen)
2nd Six Days of Ghent (with Sigi Renz)
2nd Six Days of Rotterdam (with Eddy Merckx)
3rd Six Days of Bremen (with Graeme Gilmore)
3rd Six Days of Grenoble (with René Pijnen)
1975
European Track Championships

1st Madison (with René Pijnen)

Belgian National Championships

1st Omnium
1st Madison (with Eddy Merckx)

1st Six Days of Zürich (with Günther Haritz)
1st Six Days of Berlin (with Dietrich Thurau)
1st Six Days of Bremen (with René Pijnen)
1st Six Days of Ghent (with Eddy Merckx)
1st Six Days of Antwerp (with Eddy Merckx)
1st Six Days of Grenoble (with Eddy Merckx)
2nd Six Days of Dortmund (with Eddy Merckx)
2nd Six Days of Frankfurt (with Dietrich Thurau)
2nd Six Days of Munich (with Eddy Merckx)
3rd Six Days of London (with Alain van Lancker)
3rd Six Days of Rotterdam (with Alain van Lancker)
1976
European Track Championships

1st Omnium
3rd Madison (with Klaus Bugdahl))

Belgian National Championships

1st Omnium
1st Madison (with Eddy Merckx)
1st Derny

1st Six Days of Milan with Francesco Moser)
1st Six Days of Antwerp (with Eddy Merckx)
1st Six Days of Dortmund (with Freddy Maertens)
1st Six Days of Rotterdam (with Eddy Merckx)
1st Six Days of Maastricht (with Graeme Gilmore)
2nd Six Days of Berlin (with René Pijnen)
2nd Six Days of Munich (with Graeme Gilmore)
2nd Six Days of Ghent (with Ferdi Van Den Haute)
3rd Six Days of Bremen (with Graeme Gilmore)
3rd Six Days of Grenoble (with Felice Gimondi)
1977
European Track Championships

1st Omnium
1st Madison (with Eddy Merckx)
1st Derny

Belgian National Championships

1st Omnium
1st Madison (with Ferdi Van Den Haute)

1st Six Days of Zürich (with Eddy Merckx)
1st Six Days of Antwerp (with Freddy Maertens)
1st Six Days of Ghent (with Eddy Merckx)
1st Six Days of London (with René Pijnen)
1st Six Days of Berlin (with Eddy Merckx)
1st Six Days of Munich (with Eddy Merckx)
1st Six Days of Maastricht (with Eddy Merckx)
2nd Six Days of Grenoble (with Eddy Merckx)
3rd Six Days of Dortmund (with Wilfried Peffgen)
3rd Six Days of Frankfurt (with Klaus Bugdahl)
3rd Six Days of Rotterdam (with Freddy Maertens)
3rd Six Days of Herning (with Ole Ritter)
1978
European Track Championships

1st Madison (with Gregor Braun)
2nd Derny

Belgian National Championships

1st Omnium

1st Six Days of Ghent (with Gerrie Knetemann)
1st Six Days of Frankfurt (with Dietrich Thurau)
1st Six Days of Berlin (with Dietrich Thurau)
1st Six Days of Munich (with Gregor Braun)
1st Six Days of Grenoble (with Dietrich Thurau)
2nd Six Days of Milan with Giuseppe Saronni)
3rd Six Days of Dortmund (with Dietrich Thurau)
3rd Six Days of Herning (with Niels Fredborg)
1979
European Track Championships

2nd Omnium
3rd Madison (with Dietrich Thurau)

Belgian National Championships

1st Omnium

1st Six Days of London (with Albert Fritz)
1st Six Days of Zürich (with Albert Fritz)
1st Six Days of Cologne (with Gregor Braun)
1st Six Days of Dortmund (with Dietrich Thurau)
1st Six Days of Berlin (with Dietrich Thurau)
1st Six Days of Munich (with Dietrich Thurau)
1st Six Days of Rotterdam (with Albert Fritz)
1st Six Days of Hanover (with Albert Fritz)
2nd Six Days of Frankfurt (with Dietrich Thurau)
2nd Six Days of Ghent (with Stan Tourné)
2nd Six Days of Groningen (with Albert Fritz)
3rd Six Days of Milan with Felice Gimondi)
3rd Six Days of Bremen (with Dietrich Thurau)
3rd Six Days of Antwerp (with Roger De Vlaeminck and Rik Van Linden)
3rd Six Days of Grenoble (with Bernard Vallet)
3rd Six Days of Maastricht (with Albert Fritz)
1980
European Track Championships

1st Omnium
2nd Derny

1st Six Days of Milan with Giuseppe Saronni)
1st Six Days of Dortmund (with Gregor Braun)
1st Six Days of Berlin (with Gregor Braun)
1st Six Days of Bremen (with Albert Fritz)
1st Six Days of Ghent (with Albert Fritz)
1st Six Days of Herning (with Gert Frank)
2nd Six Days of Maastricht (with Albert Fritz)
2nd Six Days of Hanover (with Dietrich Thurau)
3rd Six Days of Rotterdam (with Albert Fritz)
3rd Six Days of London (with Albert Fritz)
3rd Six Days of Cologne (with Albert Fritz)
1981
European Track Championships

3rd Omnium

Belgian National Championships

2nd Points race

1st Six Days of Milan with Francesco Moser)
1st Six Days of Cologne (with Albert Fritz)
1st Six Days of Ghent (with Gert Frank)
1st Six Days of Grenoble (with Urs Freuler)
2nd Six Days of Bremen (with Albert Fritz)
2nd Six Days of Hanover (with Gert Frank)
3rd Six Days of Zürich (with René Pijnen)
3rd Six Days of Rotterdam (with Albert Fritz)
1982
European Track Championships

1st Madison (with René Pijnen)
3rd Omnium

Belgian National Championships

1st Omnium

1st Six Days of Antwerp (with Roger De Vlaeminck)
1st Six Days of Berlin (with Maurizio Bidinost)
1st Six Days of Rotterdam (with René Pijnen)
2nd Six Days of Milan with Francesco Moser)
2nd Six Days of Cologne (with Gregor Braun)
2nd Six Days of Bremen (with Gert Frank)
2nd Six Days of Zürich (with Danny Clark)
2nd Six Days of Herning (with René Pijnen)
3rd Six Days of Ghent (with Roger De Vlaeminck)
3rd Six Days of Maastricht (with Gerrie Knetemann)
1983
1st Six Days of Rotterdam (with René Pijnen)
2nd Six Days of Milan (with Moreno Argentin)
2nd Six Days of Bremen (with Albert Fritz)
2nd Six Days of Antwerp (with Etienne De Wilde)

== Records ==
=== Overview ===
- World Record flying 500 m time trial (amateurs): 1964
- World Record 1 km time trial (amateurs): 1964
- World Record flying 1 km time trial: 1967
- World Record 1 km time trial: 1972
- World Outdoor Record flying 1 km time trial: 1973
- Most European championships wins: 15
- Most national track championships wins: 38
- Most Six Days wins: 88
- Most Six Days of Ghent wins: 11
- Most Six Days of London wins: 9

=== Details ===
==== World records ====
Discipline	Record	Date	Velodrome	Ref
Flying 500 m time trial amateurs	29"66	28 July 1964	Ordrupbanen Ordrup, Denmark	
1 km time trial amateurs	1'06"76	12 December 1964	Palais Des Sports Brussels, Belgium	
Flying 1 km time trial	1'01"23	3 Februari 1967	Sportpaleis Antwerpen, Belgium	
1 km time trial	1'07"35	2 December 1972	Hallenstadion Zürich, Switzerland	
Flying 1 km time trial outdoor	1'02"46	17 September 1973	Velodromo Vigorelli Milan, Italy	

==== Six-day wins ====
===== Timeline =====
Nr	Year	Race	Partner	Win
1	1965	Ghent	Eddy Merckx	1
2	1966	Frankfurt	Klaus Bugdahl	1
3	1967	Cologne	Klaus Bugdahl	2
4	1967	Montréal	Emile Severeyns	1
5	1967	Ghent	Eddy Merckx	2
6	1967	Münster	Klaus Bugdahl	3
7	1967	Charleroi	Ferdinand Bracke	1
8	1968	Rotterdam	Peter Post	1
9	1968	London	Peter Post	2
10	1968	Frankfurt	Rudi Altig	1
11	1968	Dortmund	Rudi Altig	2
12	1969	Bremen	Peter Post	3
13	1969	Antwerp	Peter Post and Rik Van Looy	4
14	1969	London	Peter Post	5
15	1969	Dortmund	Peter Post	6
16	1969	Frankfurt	Peter Post	7
17	1969	Charleroi	Norbert Seeuws	1
18	1970	Cologne	Peter Post	8
19	1970	Bremen	Peter Post	9
20	1970	London	Peter Post	10
21	1970	Ghent	Jean-Pierre Monseré	1
22	1971	Rotterdam	Peter Post	11
23	1971	London	Peter Post	12
24	1971	Berlin	Peter Post	13
25	1971	Frankfurt	Peter Post	14
26	1971	Ghent	Roger De Vlaeminck	1
27	1972	London	Tony Gowland	1
28	1972	Dortmund	Alain van Lancker	1
29	1972	Ghent	Julien Stevens	1
30	1973	Cologne	Alain van Lancker	2
31	1973	Milan	Julien Stevens	2
32	1973	Dortmund	Eddy Merckx	3
33	1973	Grenoble	Eddy Merckx	4
34	1973	Ghent	Graeme Gilmore	1
35	1974	Antwerp	Eddy Merckx	5
36	1974	London	René Pijnen	1
37	1974	Dortmund	René Pijnen	2
38	1975	Bremen	René Pijnen	3
39	1975	Antwerp	Eddy Merckx	6
40	1975	Berlin	Dietrich Thurau	1
41	1975	Grenoble	Eddy Merckx	7
42	1975	Ghent	Eddy Merckx	8
43	1975	Zürich	Günter Haritz	1
44	1976	Rotterdam	Eddy Merckx	9
45	1976	Antwerp	Eddy Merckx	10
46	1976	Milan	Francesco Moser	1
47	1976	Dortmund	Freddy Maertens	1
48	1976	Maastricht	Graeme Gilmore	2
49	1977	Copenhagen	Ole Ritter	1
50	1977	Antwerp	Freddy Maertens	2
51	1977	London	René Pijnen	4
52	1977	Berlin	Eddy Merck	11
53	1977	Munich	Eddy Merckx	12
54	1977	Ghent	Eddy Merckx	13
55	1977	Zürich	Eddy Merckx	14
56	1977	Maastricht	Eddy Merckx	15
57	1978	Berlin	Dietrich Thurau	2
58	1978	Frankfurt	Dietrich Thurau	3
59	1978	Grenoble	Dietrich Thurau	4
60	1978	Munich	Gregor Braun	1
61	1978	Ghent	Gerrie Knetemann	1
62	1979	Cologne	Gregor Braun	2
63	1979	Rotterdam	Albert Fritz	1
64	1979	Hanover	Albert Fritz	2
65	1979	London	Albert Fritz	3
66	1979	Berlin	Dietrich Thurau	5
67	1979	Dortmund	Dietrich Thurau	6
68	1979	Munich	Dietrich Thurau	7
69	1979	Zürich	Albert Fritz	4
70	1979	Bremen	Albert Fritz	5
71	1980	Copenhagen	Albert Fritz	6
72	1980	Copenhagen	Albert Fritz	7
73	1980	Berlin	Gregor Braun	3
74	1980	Dortmund	Gregor Braun	4
75	1980	Ghent	Albert Fritz	8
76	1980	Herning	Gert Frank	1
77	1981	Cologne	Albert Fritz	8
78	1981	Copenhagen	Albert Fritz	9
79	1981	Milan	Francesco Moser	2
80	1981	Grenoble	Urs Freuler	1
81	1981	Ghent	Gert Frank	2
82	1982	Rotterdam	René Pijnen	5
83	1982	Copenhagen	René Pijnen	6
84	1982	Antwerp	Roger De Vlaeminck	2
85	1982	Berlin	Maurizio Bidinost	1
86	1982	Munich	René Pijnen	7
87	1983	Rotterdam	René Pijnen	8
88	1983	Copenhagen	Gert Frank	3

===== Partners =====
• 15 events with Eddy Merckx

• 14 with Peter Post

• 10 with Albert Fritz

• 8 with René Pijnen

• 7 with Dietrich Thurau

• 3 with Klaus Bugdahl & Gert Frank

• 2 with Rudi Altig, Roger De Vlaeminck, Alain van Lancker, Julien Stevens, Graeme Gilmore, Francesco Moser & Freddy Maertens

==== Track Championships ====
Champion	1964	1965	1966	1967	1968	1969	1970	1971	1972	1973	1974	1975	1976	1977	1978	1979	1980	1981	1982	1983
Olympic: kilometre	1°
World track championships: sprint				1°	2°	1°
World Road Championships											rit.
European Track Championships: madison					3°	1°	1°	3°	2°			1°		3°	1°	1°	3°	3°		1°
European Track Championships: derny														1°		2°
European Track Championships: omnium		1°		1°	1°	1°	1°	1°	1°	1°			1°	1°		2°	1°	3°
:Belgian National Championships: madison		1°	1°		1°	1°	1°	1°	1°	1°	1°	1°	1°	1°
:Belgian National Championships: derny													1°
:Belgian National Championships: omnium		1°	1°	1°	1°			1°	1°		1°	1°	1°	1°	1°	1°			1°
:Belgian National Championships: sprint		1°		1°	1°	1°
National road championship											5°
National road championship points																	2°		4°

==== Track races ====
Races	1964	1965	1966	1967	1968	1969	1970	1971	1972	1973	1974	1975	1976	1977	1978	1979	1980	1981	1982	1983
Omnium Cherbourg											1°
Amsterdam six			3°
Antwerp six		2°	2°	2°	3°	1°	2°	rit.	2°		1°	1°	1°	1°	rit.	2°	rit.		1°	2°
Berlin six		5°	5°	3°	4°	2°	2°	2°	4°	rit.		1°	2°	1°	1°	1°	1°	4°	1°
Bremen six				3°	5°	5°	1°	2°	2°	4°	3°	1°	3°	2°	6°		1°	2°	2°	2°
Brussels six		2°					rit.	2°
Charleroi six				1°	3°	1°
Cologne six				1°	2°	2°	1°			1°	2°	rit.				1°	3°	1°	2°	5°
Copenhagen six														1°	rit.	3°	1°	1°	1°	1°
Dortmund six			4°	2°	3°	1°	6°		1°	1°	1°	2°	1°	3°	3°	3°	1°	6°	6°
Essen six		4°	4°
Frankfurt six			1°		1°	1°	rit.	1°	4°			2°	5°	1°	1°	2°		rit.
Ghent six		1°	2°	1°	2°	2°	1°	1°	1°	1°	2°	1°	2°	1°	1°	2°	1°	1°
Grenoble six										1°	2°	1°	3°	2°	1°	3°	4°	1°
Groningen six																2°
Hanover six																1°	2°	2°
Herning six														3°	3°		1°	4°	2°
London six					1°	1°	1°	1°	1°	2°	1°	2°		1°	5°	1°	3°
Maastricht six													1°	1°	4°	3°	2°		3°
Milan six			3°	2°		2°		4°	2°	1°			1°		2°	3°	1°	1°	2°	2°
Monaco six									3°	4°	rit.	2°	2°	1°	1°	1°	rit.		1°
Montréal six				1°	2°	2°
Münster six				1°
Rotterdam six					1°			1°		2°	2°	3°	1°	3°	4°	1°	3°	3°	1°	1°
Zürich six			3°	2°	2°	3°		4°	4°	8°		2°	3°	1°	4°	1°	8°	3°	2°

==== Italian classics ====
Classics	1964	1965	1966	1967	1968	1969	1970	1971	1972	1973	1974	1975	1976	1977	1978	1979	1980	1981	1982	1983
Giro del Piemonte						4°
Giro di Campania								2°
Giro di Toscana													62°
Milan–San Remo						11°		31°	27°	5°	116°	11°	7°	8°
Milano–Torino								10°					7°
Milano–Vignola							2°	2°		2°		2°

==== Non-Italian classics ====
Classics	1964	1965	1966	1967	1968	1969	1970	1971	1972	1973	1974	1975	1976	1977	1978	1979	1980	1981	1982	1983
Flèche Wallonne						15°
Gent–Wevelgem						9°	5°		49°		20°
Tour of Flanders							7°	44°		9°	9°
Paris–Roubaix						8°	18°
Paris–Tours									11°

==== Stage races ====
Races (stage races)	1964	1965	1966	1967	1968	1969	1970	1971	1972	1973	1974	1975	1976	1977	1978	1979	1980	1981	1982	1983
Deutschland Tour																12° (1)
Tour of Belgium							rit.								rit. (1)
Critérium du Dauphiné Libéré														70° (4)
Tour of the Mediterranean														(2)
Giro d'Italia							90° (1)	69° (2)	rit.	97° (1)	rit. (3)	67° (3)	rit. (3)
Giro di Puglia										(1)			(1)
Tour of Romandy								(1)				(1)
Tour of Sardinia							1° (1)	15° (1)			5° (3)	(1)		3° (2)
Paris–Nice														(2)
Tirreno–Adriatico						(1)	6° (1)		(1)			(1)	(1)
Tour de France											89° (3)			rit. (3)

==== Other road aces ====
Races	1964	1965	1966	1967	1968	1969	1970	1971	1972	1973	1974	1975	1976	1977	1978	1979	1980	1981	1982	1983
Acht van Chaam												3°
Bellariva-Rimini								3°
Brussels-Ingooigem											1°	5°
Brussels-Meulebeke								4°
Cagliari-Sassari								3°	1°	1°
Circuito degli Assi di Pavullo								4°
Circuito di Cotignola							3°
Circuit of the Port of Dunkirk												1°
Circuit of South-West Flanders																	1°
Circuit of Central Flanders					1°
Tour of the Vallée de la Lys						1°
Tour of the Flemish Ardennes											1°	1°
Tour des Régions Frontières															1°
Elfstedenronde										1°
Coppa Bernocchi								2°	2°
Coppa Sabatini							2°
Criterium degli Assi di Nogaro											5°
Criterium Bourcefranc			1°
Criterium Callac											9°
Criterium Hank															1°
Criterium Lignano									1°
Criterium Mol																	1°
Criterium Nantes													1°
Criterium Rouergue											1°
Criterium Tortoretto								1°
Criterium Zolder		1°
Freccia Mosana										1°
Ronde van Limburg					2°
Giro di Calabria							2°
Giro della Provincia di Reggio Calabria							3°
Giro di Sardegna							1°		3°					3°
Giro di Sicilia											2°
Gran Premio Cemab												2°
GP Roeselare						4°		1°
GP Union Dortmund																1°
Harelbeke-Antwerp-Harelbeke										6°				2°
Het Volk						5°						2°	3°	7°
Kuurne–Brussels–Kuurne														1°
Memorial Tom Simpson				1°								1°
Paris–Camembert								2°	2°
Petegem-Deinze																			9°

== Honours ==
- Honorary Citizen of Izegem: 1996
- Introduced in the Olympiapark München Walk of Stars: 2003
- A velodrome, Wielerbaan Patrick Sercu in Bruges: 2007
- A velodrome, Wielerpiste Defraeye-Sercu in Roeselare: 2011
- Belgian Olympic and Interfederal Committee Order of Merit: 2014
- Patrick Sercu trophy: from 2019
- A street, Patrick Sercudreef in Izegem: 2020
