= Six Days of Frankfurt =

Cycling race

Race details
- Region: Frankfurt, Germany
- Discipline: Track
- Type: Six-day racing

History
- First edition: 1911
- Editions: 37 (as of 1983)
- Final edition: 1983
- First winner: John Stol (NED); Gottfried Hürtgen (GER)
- Most wins: Albert Fritz (FRG) (6 wins)
- Final winner: Albert Fritz (FRG); Dietrich Thurau (FRG)

The Six Days of Frankfurt was a six-day track cycling race held annually in Frankfurt, Germany.

== Winners ==
Year	Winner
1911	(Germany) John Stol (Germany) Walter Rütt
1912	(Germany) Albert Eichholz (Germany) Otto Rosenfeld
1913– 1927	No race
1928	(Switzerland) Emil Richli (Germany) Willy Rieger
1929	(Germany) Oskar Tietz (Germany) Willy Rieger
1930	No race
1931	(Germany) Karl Göbel (Italy) Alfredo Dinale
1932	(Germany) Adolf Schön (Germany) Oskar Tietz
1933	(Netherlands) Jan Pijnenburg (Germany) Victor Rausch
1934– 1950	No race
1951	(West Germany) Ludwig Hörmann (West Germany) Harry Saager
1952	(Switzerland) Hugo Koblet (Switzerland) Armin von Büren
1953	(Switzerland) Hugo Koblet (Switzerland) Armin von Büren
1954	(Switzerland) Jean Roth (Switzerland) Walter Bucher
1955	(France) Georges Senfftleben (France) Dominique Forlini

Any	Guanyadors
1956	(Denmark) Kay Werner Nielsen (Denmark) Evan Klamer
1957	No race
1958	(Belgium) Rik Van Steenbergen (Belgium) Emile Severeyns
1959	(Denmark) Kay Werner Nielsen (Denmark) Palle Lykke
1960	(Denmark) Kay Werner Nielsen (Denmark) Palle Lykke
1961	(Switzerland) Fritz Pfenninger (West Germany) Klaus Bugdahl
1962	(Switzerland) Fritz Pfenninger (West Germany) Klaus Bugdahl
1963	(Belgium) Rik Van Steenbergen (Denmark) Palle Lykke
1964	(West Germany) Rudi Altig (West Germany) Hans Junkermann
1965	(West Germany) Rudi Altig (West Germany) Dieter Kemper
1966	(Belgium) Patrick Sercu (West Germany) Klaus Bugdahl
1967	(Netherlands) Peter Post (Switzerland) Fritz Pfenninger
1968	(Belgium) Patrick Sercu (West Germany) Rudi Altig
1969	(Netherlands) Peter Post (Belgium) Patrick Sercu

Year	Winner
1970	(West Germany) Sigi Renz (West Germany) Jürgen Tschan
1971	(Netherlands) Peter Post (Belgium) Patrick Sercu
1972	(Netherlands) Leo Duyndam (West Germany) Jürgen Tschan
1973	(West Germany) Sigi Renz (West Germany) Wolfgang Schulze
1974	No disputats
1975	(Netherlands) René Pijnen (West Germany) Günther Haritz
1976	(West Germany) Dietrich Thurau (West Germany) Günther Haritz
1977	(West Germany) Dietrich Thurau (West Germany) Jürgen Tschan
1978	(Belgium) Patrick Sercu (West Germany) Dietrich Thurau
1979	(Netherlands) René Pijnen (West Germany) Gregor Braun
1980	(Netherlands) René Pijnen (West Germany) Gregor Braun
1981	(West Germany) Dietrich Thurau (West Germany) Gregor Braun
1982	No race
1983	(West Germany) Dietrich Thurau (West Germany) Albert Fritz
