= Theo Verschueren =

Belgian cyclist (1943)

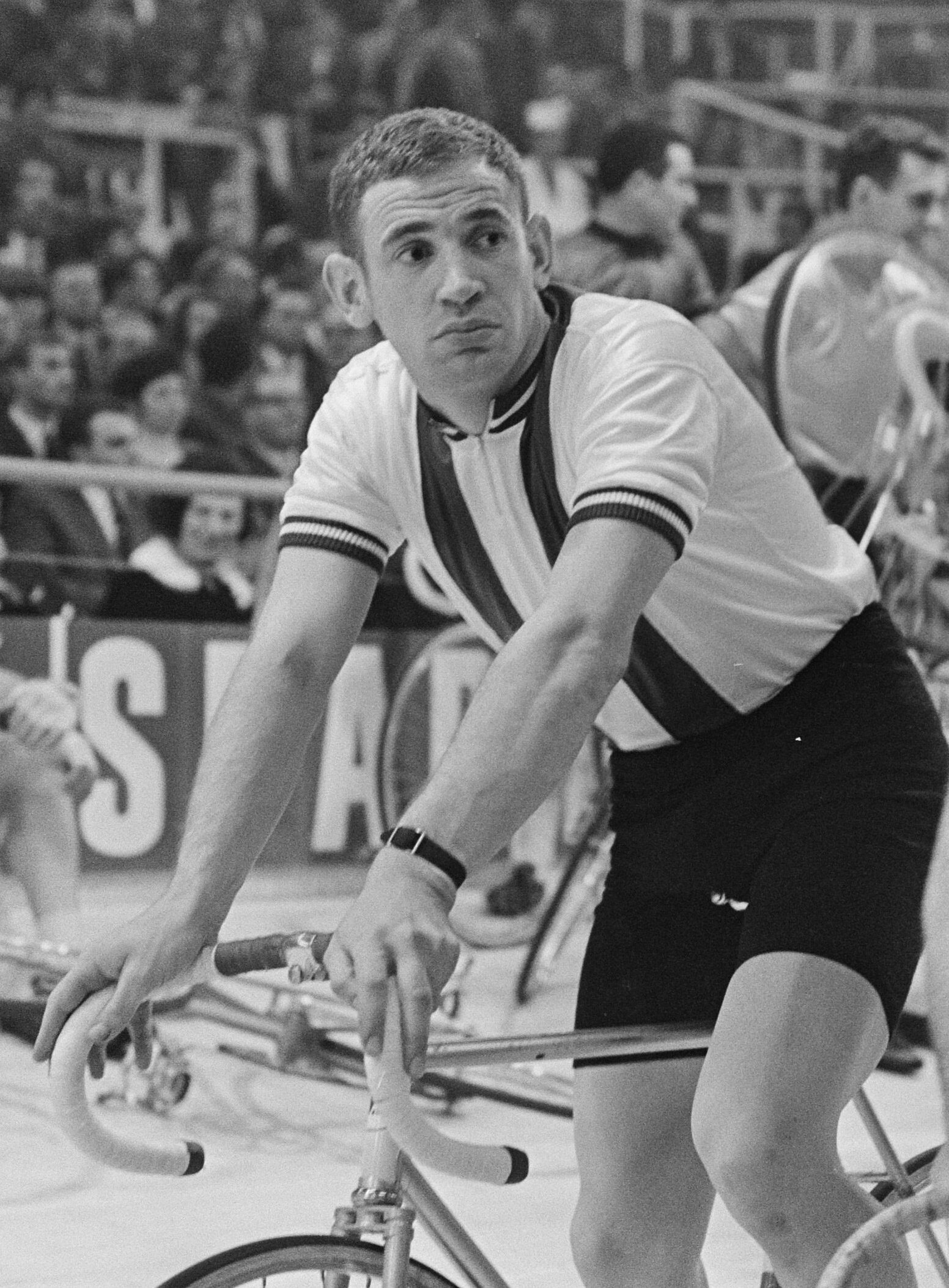
- Theo Verschueren in 1966

Personal information
- Full name: Theo Verschueren
- Born: 27 January 1943 Sint Jansteen, Netherlands

Cycling career
- Sport: Cycling
- Current team: Retired
- Disciplines: Track and road
- Role: Rider
- Rider type: Sprinter

Professional teams
- 1964: Dr. Mann-Labo
- 1965: Dr. Mann
- 1966-1967: Roméo-Smith's
- 1968: Goldor-Gerka-Main d'Or
- 1969: Goldor-Hertekamp-Gerka
- 1970-1971: Hertekamp-Magniflex
- 1972-1973: Rokado
- 1974: MIC-Ludo-de Gribaldy

Major wins
- National Track Championships Madison (1965) Derny (1965, 1968, 1969, 1970, 1971, 1973) Motor-paced (1969, 1970, 1971, 1973)
Medal record
Representing Belgium
Motor-paced World Championships
Gold medal – first place	1971 Varese	Professionals
Gold medal – first place	1972 Marseille	Professionals
Silver medal – second place	1969 Brno	Professionals
Silver medal – second place	1970 Leicester	Professionals
Silver medal – second place	1974 Montreal	Professionals
European Track Championships
Gold medal – first place	1968 Antwerp	Derny
Gold medal – first place	1971 Antwerp	Derny
Gold medal – first place	1972 Köln	Derny
Gold medal – first place	1973 Antwerp	Derny
Gold medal – first place	1974 Rotterdam	Derny
Silver medal – second place	1965 Antwerp	Derny
Silver medal – second place	1969 Antwerp	Derny
Silver medal – second place	1970 Antwerp	Derny

Theo Verschueren (born 27 January 1943) is a retired Belgian cyclist. He had his best achievements in motor-paced racing, in which he won the world championships in the professionals category in 1971 and 1972 and finished second in 1969, 1970 and 1974. During his career Verschueren took part in 67 six-day road races, winning the race of Antwerp in 1968 and 1972.

He married the daughter of Belgian cyclist Petrus Van Theemsche. He is not related to Adolph Verschueren, another motor-paced racing world champion from Belgium.

== Major results ==
=== Track ===
1965
Belgian National Championships

1st Derny
1st Madison (with Robert Lelangue)

2nd European Track Championships – Derny
2nd Six Days of Charleroi (with Norbert Seeuws)
3rd Six Days of Antwerp (with Patrick Sercu & Emile Severeyns)
1966
2nd :Belgian National Championships - Madison(with Gilbert Maes)
1967
3rd :Belgian National Championships - Motor-paced
1968
1st European Track Championships – Derny
Belgian National Championships

1st - Derny

2nd - Motor-paced
3rd - Omnium
1st Six Days of Antwerp (with Sigi Renz & Emile Severeyns)
1969
2nd UCI Track World Championships - Motor paced
2nd European Track Championships – Derny
Belgian National Championships

1st Derny
1st Motor-paced racing

3rd Six Days of Antwerp (with Sigi Renz & Emile Severeyns)
1970
2nd UCI Track World Championships - Motor paced
2nd European Track Championships – Derny
Belgian National Championships

1st Derny
1st Motor-paced racing

3rd Six Days of Antwerp (with Sigi Renz & Rik Van Looy)
1971
1st UCI Track World Championships - Motor paced
1st European Track Championships – Derny
Belgian National Championships

1st Derny
1st Motor-paced racing
3rd Madison

3rd Six Days of Antwerp (with Sigi Renz & Walter Godefroot)
3rd Six Days of Ghent (with Julien Stevens)
1972
1st UCI Track World Championships - Motor paced
1st European Track Championships – Derny
1st Six Days of Antwerp (with René Pijnen & Leo Duyndam)
2nd European Track Championships - Motor-paced racing
2nd Belgian National Championships - Madison
2nd Six Days of Groningen (with Graeme Gilmore)
1973
1st European Track Championships – Derny
2nd European Track Championships - Motor-paced racing
Belgian National Championships

1st Derny
1st Motor-paced racing

3rd Six Days of Antwerp (with Norbert Seeuws & Walter Godefroot)
3rd Six Days of Ghent (with Cees Stam)
1974
1st European Track Championships – Derny
2nd UCI Track World Championships - Motor paced
2nd Belgian National Championships - Motor-paced

=== Road ===
1962
1st Coupe Marcel Indekeu
1963
1st Tour of Belgium amateurs
1st Ronde van Vlaanderen Amateurs
2nd Tour of Belgium indepentent
3rd Belgian National Championships Amateurs
1964
1st Antwerpse Havenpijl
1st Grand Prix d'Orchies
2nd GP Flandria
1965
1st Stage 6 (TTT) Four Days of Dunkirk
1966
1st Stage 1 (TTT) Tour de Romandie
1st Omloop van de Westkust
2nd GP Dr. Eugeen Roggeman
1967
2nd Omloop van Midden-Vlaanderen
3rd De Pinte
1968
1st GP Stad Sint-Niklaas
1972
1st Belsele-Puivelde
