= Six Days of Charleroi =

Cycling race

Race details
- Date: Mid-December
- Region: Charleroi, Belgium
- Local name(s): Six Jours de Charleroi (in French)
- Discipline: Track
- Type: Six-day racing

History
- First edition: 1967
- Editions: 3
- Final edition: 1969
- First winner: Patrick Sercu (BEL); Ferdinand Bracke (BEL)
- Most wins: Patrick Sercu (BEL); Ferdinand Bracke (BEL) (2 wins)
- Final winner: Patrick Sercu (BEL); Norbert Seeuws (BEL)

The Six Days of Charleroi was a short-lived six-day track cycling race held annually in Charleroi, Belgium.

It took place on a dismountable velodrome, especially installed for the event in the Charleroi Exhibition Centre. Three editions were organized from 1967 to 1969, of which Patrick Sercu and Ferdinand Bracke won two.

== Winners ==
Year	Winner	Second	Third
1967	(Belgium) Patrick Sercu (Belgium) Ferdinand Bracke	(Belgium) Norbert Seeuws (Belgium) Théo Verschueren	(Italy) Giuseppe Beghetto (West Germany) Klaus Bugdahl
1968	(Belgium) Eddy Merckx (Belgium) Ferdinand Bracke	(Belgium) Robert Lelangue (Belgium) Julien Stevens	(Belgium) Rik Van Looy (Belgium) Patrick Sercu
1969	(Belgium) Norbert Seeuws (Belgium) Patrick Sercu	(Belgium) Eddy Merckx (Belgium) Julien Stevens	(West Germany) Rudi Altig (Belgium) Ferdinand Bracke
