= Norbert Seeuws =

Belgian cyclist

Personal information
- Full name: Norbert Seeuws
- Born: 19 August 1943 (age 83) Ghent, Belgium

Cycling career
- Sport: Cycling
- Discipline: Road/Track
- Role: Rider

Professional teams
- 1966: Goldor
- 1967: Flandria–De Clerck
- 1968: Flandria–De Clerck–Krüger
- 1969: Willem II–Gazelle
- 1970: Goldor–Frijns
- 1971: Bika–Milupa
- 1972: Goldor–IJsboerke
- 1973–1975: Individual
- 1976: Zoppas–Splendor–Sinalco

Norbert Seeuws (born 19 August 1943) is a Belgian former professional cyclist who had his major successes on track.

He was professional from 1966 to 1979.

== Major results ==
=== Track ===
1963
Belgian National Championships

1st Amateur team pursuit (with Roger De Wilde, André Oosterlinck & Roger De Clercq)

1964
Belgian National Championships

2nd Amateur team pursuit

1965
Belgian National Championships

3rd Amateur Madison

1967
2nd Six Days of Charleroi (with Théo Verschueren)
Belgian National Championships

3rd Professional Madison (with Hubert Criel)

1968
Belgian National Championships

3rd Professional Madison (with Hubert Criel)

1969
Belgian National Championships

1st Individual pursuit, National Track Championships
3rd Professional Madison (with Romain De Loof)

1st Six Days of Charleroi (with Patrick Sercu)
3rd Six Days of Ghent (with Peter Post)
1970
Belgian National Championships

1st Madison (with Patrick Sercu)

1st Six Days of Milan (with Dieter Kemper)
2nd Six Days of Brussels (with Ferdinand Bracke)
1971
Belgian National Championships

2nd Professional Madison (with Walter Godefroot)

2nd Six Days of Montreal (with Julien Stevens)
1972
1st Six Days of Montreal (with Julien Stevens)
Belgian National Championships

3rd Professional Madison (with Rik Van Linden)

2nd Six Days of Ghent (with Alain van Lancker)
3rd Six Days of Grenoble (with Felice Gimondi)
3rd Six Days of Groningen (with René Pijnen)
1973
Belgian National Championships

2nd Professional Madison (with Walter Godefroot)

3rd Six Days of Montreal (with Julien Stevens)
3rd Six Days of Antwerp (with Walter Godefroot and Théo Verschueren)
1973
2nd Six Days of Ontario with Eddy Demedts
