= World record progression track cycling – Men's flying 500 m time trial =

This is an overview of the progression of the world track cycling record of the men's 500 m flying start as recognised by the Union Cycliste Internationale.

== Progression ==
=== Professionals (1955–1992) ===
Time	Cyclist	Location, velodrome	Track	Date
28"80	Marino Morettini (ITA)	Milan (ITA), Vigorelli	Open air track	29 August 1955
28"705	Robert Dill-Bundi (SUI)	Zürich (SUI), Oerlikon	Open air track	11 August 1982
27"896	D. Rueda Efrain (COL)	Mexico City (MEX), Olympic Velodrome	Open air track	8 November 1985
27"432	D. Rueda Efrain (COL)	La Paz (BOL), Alto Irpavi	Open air track	12 December 1986
29"80	Jacques Bellenger (FRA)	Paris (FRA), Vélodrome d'Hiver	Indoor track	28 November 1954
29"	Oscar Plattner (SUI)	Zürich (SUI), Hallenstadion	Indoor track	8 January 1956
29"	Arie Van Vliet (NED)	Zürich (SUI), Hallenstadion	Indoor track	8 January 1956
28"60	Oscar Plattner (SUI)	Zürich (SUI), Hallenstadion	Indoor track	17 August 1956
28"486	Urs Freuler (SUI)	Vienna (AUT), Ferry-Dusika-Hallenstadion	Indoor track	2 October 1981
28"281	P. Boyer (FRA)	Grenoble (FRA), Palais Des Sports	Indoor track	1 November 1987
27"451	Stephen Pate (AUS)	Launceston (AUS), Tasmania	Indoor track	19 March 1989
27"350	Michael Huebner (GER)	Stuttgart (GER), Velodrome H.M. Schleyer	Indoor track	18 January 1992

=== Amateurs (1954–1990) ===
Time	Cyclist	Location, velodrome	Track	Date
30"40	A. Morselli (ITA)	Milan (ITA), Vigorelli	Open air track	25 October 1954
29"80	Valentino Gasparella (ITA)	Milan (ITA), Vigorelli	Open air track	29 August 1955
29"66	Patrick Sercu (BEL)	Copenhagen (DEN), Ordrup	Open air track	28 July 1964
29"40	Viktor Logunov (URS)	Irkutsk (URS), St. Dyanmo	Open air track	29 July 1964
28"80	Pierre Trentin (FRA)	Milan (ITA), Vigorelli	Open air track	6 June 1967
27"85	Pierre Trentin (FRA)	Mexico City (MEX), Centre Sp.	Open air track	21 October 1967
27"310	Gordon Singleton (CAN)	Mexico City (MEX), Olympic Velodrome	Open air track	9 October 1980
26"993	Rory O'Reilly (USA)	La Paz (BOL), Alto Irpavi	Open air track	23 November 1985
30"60	Roger Gaignard (FRA)	Saint-Étienne (FRA), Vélodrome d'Hiver	Indoor track	5 December 1954
30"	Guglielmo Pesenti (ITA)	Milan (ITA), Palais Des Sports	Indoor track	18 January 1956
29"40	Guglielmo Pesenti (ITA)	Milan (ITA), Palais Des Sports	Indoor track	17 February 1957
29"	Pierre Trentin (FRA)	Zürich (SUI), Hallenstadion	Indoor track	4 November 1966
28"93	Pierre Trentin (FRA)	Zürich (SUI), Hallenstadion	Indoor track	20 November 1966
28"89	Pierre Trentin (FRA)	Zürich (SUI), Hallenstadion	Indoor track	5 November 1967
28"75	Daniel Morelon (FRA)	Milan (ITA), Palais Des Sports	Indoor track	12 June 1976
28"304	Giorgio Rossi (ITA)	Milan (ITA), Palais Des Sports	Indoor track	5 August 1978
28"163	Heinz Isler (SUI)	Zürich (SUI), Hallenstadion	Indoor track	9 July 1979
28"040	Sergei Kopylov (URS)	Moscow (URS)	Indoor track	30 July 1982
27"836	Otar Mtchedlichvili (URS)	Moscow (URS)	Indoor track	12 October 1983
27"469	Alexandre Panfilov (URS)	Moscow (URS)	Indoor track	5 August 1984
26"715	Nikolai Kovsh (URS)	Moscow (URS)	Indoor track	17 August 1987

=== Open (from 1988) ===
Time	Cyclist	Location, velodrome	Track	Date
26"649	Alexandre Kiritchenko (URS)	Moscow (URS)	Indoor track	29 October 1988
25"850	Arnaud Duble (FRA)	La Paz (BOL), Alto Irpavi	Open air track	10 October 2001
24"758	Chris Hoy (GBR)	La Paz (BOL), Alto Irpavi	Open air track	13 May 2007
24"564	Jeffrey Hoogland (NED)	Aguascalientes (MEX), Velódromo Bicentenario	Indoor wood 250m track	31 October 2023
