= Armin von Büren =

Swiss cyclist (1928–2018)

Personal information
- Born: 20 April 1928 Zürich, Switzerland
- Died: 10 February 2018 (aged 89) Zürich, Switzerland

Cycling career
- Sport: Cycling
- Disciplines: Track; Road
- Role: Rider

Professional teams
- 1951–1953: Feru
- 1953: Guerra
- 1954–1957: Cilo
- 1955: Faema–Guerra
- 1957–1962: Feru

Armin von Büren (20 April 1928 – 10 February 2018) was a Swiss cyclist. A professional from 1948 to 1962 and a specialist in six-day races, he competed in 58 and won 13. He also won the European Madison Championships in 1953 and 1954 and the European Omnium Championships in 1956. He also occasionally competed on the road and won the Tour du Lac Léman in 1951 and 1953.

His brothers Oskar and Émile were also professional cyclists.

== Major results ==
=== Track ===
1950
1st Six Days of Hanover (with Hugo Koblet)
3rd Six Days of Paris
1951
1st Prix Dupré-Lapize (with Ferdi Kübler)
3rd Six Days of Saint-Étienne
3rd Six Days of Berlin
1952
1st Six Days of Dortmund (with Hugo Koblet)
1st Six Days of Frankfurt (with Hugo Koblet)
1st Six Days of Ghent (with Walter Bucher)
1st Six Days of Kiel (with Jean Roth)
3rd Six Days of London
1953
1st Madison, European Track Championships (with Hugo Koblet)
1st Six Days of Brussels (with Hugo Koblet)
1st Six Days of Frankfurt (with Hugo Koblet)
2nd Six Days of Dortmund
3rd Six Days of Hanover
1954
1st Madison, European Track Championships (with Hugo Koblet)
1st Six Days of Zurich (with Hugo Koblet)
2nd Six Days of Antwerp
3rd Six Days of Frankfurt
1955
1st Six Days of Dortmund (with Hugo Koblet)
1956
1st Omnium, European Track Championships
1st Prix Hourlier-Comès (with Hugo Koblet)
1957
1st Sprint, National Championships
1st Six Days of Zurich (with Gerrit Schulte)
1st Six Days of Münster (with Jean Roth)
2nd Six Days of Antwerp
2nd Grand Prix de Paris
1959
1st Sprint, National Championships
1961
1st Six Days of Madrid (with Oscar Plattner)
1st Six Days of New York (with Oscar Plattner)

=== Road ===
1951
1st Tour du Lac Léman
1952
1st Rund um Altdorf
1953
1st Tour du Lac Léman
10th Züri-Metzgete
