= Omloop van Midden-Vlaanderen =

Belgian cycling race

Race details
- Date: May
- Region: Flanders, Belgium
- English name: Circuit of Central Flanders
- Local name(s): Omloop van Midden-Vlaanderen (Dutch), Circuit de Flandre Centrale (French)
- Discipline: Road
- Competition: Cat. 1.2
- Type: One-day

History
- First edition: 1936
- Editions: 36
- Final edition: 1976
- First winner: Maurits Raes (BEL)
- Most wins: André Messelis (BEL); Roger De Corte (BEL); Willy Planckaert (BEL) (2 wins)
- Final winner: Eric Leman (BEL)

The Omloop van Midden-Vlaanderen was a men's cycling race organized for the last time in 1976. The start and finish place was Deinze (East Flanders, Belgium).

The competition's roll of honor includes the successes of Patrick Sercu and Freddy Maertens.

== Winners ==
Year	Winner	Second	Third
1936	(Belgium) Maurits Raes	(Belgium) Michel D'Hooghe	(Netherlands) Gerrit Van Der Ruit
1937	(Belgium) Lodewijk Noens	(Belgium) Roger Vandendriessche	(Belgium) Michel D'Hooghe
1938	(Belgium) Auguste Toubeau	(Belgium) Sylvain Grysolle	(Belgium) Michel Hermie
1939	(Belgium) Michel Claes	(Belgium) Georges Christiaans	(Belgium) Maurice De Simpelaere
1940–1944	No race during World War II		
1945	(Belgium) André Maelbrancke	(Belgium) Michel Remue	(Belgium) André Pieters
1946	(Belgium) Richard Depoorter	(Belgium) Achiel Buysse	(Belgium) Achiel De Backer
1947	(Belgium) André Rosseel	(Belgium) Michel Remue	(Belgium) Lucien Matthijs
1948	(Belgium) Achiel Buysse	(Belgium) Michel Remue	(Belgium) André Pieters
1949	(Belgium) Roger De Corte	(Belgium) Lucien Matthijs	(Belgium) Gaston De Wachter
1950	(Belgium) René Mertens	(Netherlands) Hendrick De Hoog	(Belgium) Henri Bauwens
1951	(Belgium) Roger De Corte	(Netherlands) Jos De Feyter	(Belgium) Louis Brusselmans
1952	(Belgium) Lucien Matthijs	(Belgium) Constant Verschueren	(Belgium) Frans Viskens
1953	(Belgium) Guillaume Labaere	(Belgium) Henri Vankerckhove	(Belgium) Rene Meeuwis
1954	(Belgium) Julien Van Dijke	(Belgium) Baudouin De Vos	(Belgium) Roger Wyckstandt
1955	(Belgium) Henri Denys	(Belgium) Lucien Demunster	(Belgium) Baudouin De Vos
1956	(Belgium) Germain Derijke	(Belgium) Julien Schepens	(Belgium) Norbert Kerckhove
1957	(Belgium) André Noyelle	(Belgium) René Mertens	(Belgium) André Auquier
1958	(Netherlands) Arie van Wetten	(Belgium) Michel Van Aerde	(Belgium) Florent Rondelé
1959	(Belgium) Norbert Kerckhove	(Belgium) Leopold Rosseel	(Belgium) Lucien Demunster
1960	(Belgium) Roger De Cock	(Belgium) Karel Clerckx	(Belgium) Daniel Doom
1961	(Belgium) André Messelis	(Netherlands) Piet Rentmeester	(Belgium) André Noyelle
1962	(Belgium) André Messelis	(Belgium) Arthur Decabooter	(Belgium) Frans De Mulder
1963	(Belgium) Maurice Meuleman	(Belgium) Benoni Beheyt	(Belgium) Gustaaf De Smet
1964	(Belgium) Jacques De Boever	(Belgium) Arthur Decabooter	(Belgium) Edward Sels
1965	(Belgium) Benoni Beheyt	(Belgium) Ivo Molenaers	(Belgium) Arthur Decabooter
1966	(Belgium) Louis Proost	(Belgium) Hugo Scrayen	(Belgium) Henri Pauwels
1967	(Belgium) Joseph Mathy	(Belgium) Theo Verschueren	(Belgium) Jozef Boons
1968	(Belgium) Patrick Sercu	(Belgium) Bernard Vandekerckhove	(Belgium) Emile Bodart
1969	(Belgium) Willy Planckaert	(Belgium) Jacques De Boever	(Belgium) Roger Cooreman
1970	(Belgium) Willy Planckaert	(Belgium) Pol Mahieu	(Belgium) Walter Boucquet
1971	(Belgium) Fernand Hermie	(Belgium) Emiel Cambre	(Netherlands) Joop Zoetemelk
1972	(Belgium) Frans Kerremans	(Belgium) Aimé Delaere	(Belgium) Ghislain Van Landeghem
1973	(Belgium) Eddy Peelman	(Belgium) Romain Maes	(Belgium) Willy Van Malderghem
1974	(Belgium) Freddy Maertens	(Netherlands) Fedor Den Hertog	(Belgium) Jean Van De Wiele
1975	(Belgium) Luc Leman	(Belgium) Bernard Deaux	(Belgium) Hervé Vermeeren
1976	(Belgium) Eric Leman	(Belgium) Marc Renier	(Belgium) Erik Jacques
