= World record progression track cycling – Men's 1 km time trial =

This is an overview of the progression of the world track cycling record of the men's 1 km time trial as recognised by the Union Cycliste Internationale.

== Progression ==
=== Professionals (1949–1989) ===
Time	Cyclist	Location	Velodrome	Track	Date
1'09"80	Reg Harris (GBR)	Milan (ITA)	Vigorelli	Open air track	23 October 1949
1'08"60	Reg Harris (GBR)	Milan (ITA)	Vigorelli	Open air track	26 October 1952
1'07"49	Peder Pedersen (DEN)	Rome (ITA)	Olympic Velodrome	Open air track	27 June 1974
1'06"791	Urs Freuler (SUI)	Zurich (SUI)	Oerlikon	Open air track	25 August 1981
1'06"091	Urs Freuler (SUI)	Zurich (SUI)	Oerlikon	Open air track	9 August 1983
1'05"200	D. Rueda Efrain (COL)	Mexico City (MEX)	Olympic Velodrome	Open air track	9 November 1985
1'05"100	D. Rueda Efrain (COL)	La Paz (BOL)	Alto Irpavi	Open air track	15 December 1986
1'09"60	Jacques Bellenger (FRA)	Paris (FRA)	D'Hiver	Indoor track	9 November 1952
1'09"	Reg Harris (GBR)	Paris (FRA)	D'Hiver	Indoor track	9 November 1952
1'08"90	Reg Harris (GBR)	Dortmund (FRG)	Westfalenhallen	Indoor track	12 February 1955
1'08"80	Fritz Pfenninger (SUI)	Zurich (SUI)	Hallenstadion	Indoor track	17 August 1956
1'08"	Reg Harris (GBR)	Zurich (SUI)	Hallenstadion	Indoor track	19 July 1957
1'07"35	Patrick Sercu (BEL)	Zurich (SUI)	Hallenstadion	Indoor track	2 December 1972
1'06"603	Urs Freuler (SUI)	Zurich (SUI)	Hallenstadion	Indoor track	30 October 1981
1'04"147	Stephen Pate (AUS)	Launceston (AUS)	Tasmania	Indoor track	19 March 1989

=== Amateurs (1949–1989) ===
Time	Cyclist	Location	Velodrome	Track	Date
1'10"60	Marino Morettini (ITA)	Milan (ITA)	Vigorelli	Open air track	18 October 1950
1'10"40	Rostislav Vargashkin (URS)	Moscow (URS)		Open air track	20 July 1953
1'10"20	Rostislav Vargashkin (URS)	Tula (URS)	St. Chakhter	Open air track	21 June 1954
1'09"80	A. De Michelli (VEN)	Mexico City (MEX)	Parc Calles	Open air track	20 March 1955
1'09"50	Rostislav Vargashkin (URS)	Irkutsk (URS)	St. Dyanmo	Open air track	6 July 1955
1'09"20	Leandro Faggin (ITA)	Milan (ITA)	Vigorelli	Open air track	5 September 1956
1'08"40	Giuseppe Beghetto (ITA)	Milan (ITA)	Vigorelli	Open air track	7 June 1959
1'07"50	Sante Gaiardoni (ITA)	Rome (ITA)	Olympic Velodrome	Open air track	3 July 1960
1'07"27	Sante Gaiardoni (ITA)	Rome (ITA)	Olympic Velodrome	Open air track	26 August 1960
1'04"61	Gianni Sartori (ITA)	Mexico City (MEX)	Centre Sp.	Open air track	21 October 1967
1'03"91	Pierre Trentin (FRA)	Mexico City (MEX)	Olympic Velodrome	Open air track	17 October 1968
1'03"823	Gordon Singleton (CAN)	Mexico City (MEX)	Olympic Velodrome	Open air track	10 October 1980
1'02"547	Maic Malchow (RDA)	Mexico City (MEX)	Olympic Velodrome	Open air track	14 October 1980
1'11"60	Roger Gaignard (FRA)	Paris (FRA)	D'Hiver	Indoor track	20 November 1954
1'10"20	Roger Gaignard (FRA)	Paris (FRA)	D'Hiver	Indoor track	28 November 1954
1'09"60	Rudi Altig (RFA)	Cologne (FRG)	Sporthalle	Indoor track	13 November 1959
1'08"74	Lothar Claesges (RFA)	Berlin (FRG)	Deutschland Halle	Indoor track	24 November 1963
1'06"76	Patrick Sercu (BEL)	Brussels (BEL)	Palais Des Sports	Indoor track	12 December 1964
1'06"157	Alexandre Panfilov (URS)	Moscow (URS)		Indoor track	13 June 1980
1'05"582	Urs Freuler (SUI)	Zurich (SUI)	Hallenstadion	Indoor track	17 June 1980
1'02"955	Lothar Thoms (RDA)	Moscow (URS)		Indoor track	22 July 1980
1'02"823	Martin Vinnicombe (AUS)	Launceston (AUS)	Tasmania	Indoor track	19 March 1989
1'02"576	Alexandre Kiritchenko (URS)	Moscow (URS)		Indoor track	2 August 1989

=== Open (from 1986) ===
Time	Cyclist	Location	Velodrome	Track	Date
1'02"091	Maic Malchow (RDA)	Colorado Springs (USA)		Open air track	28 August 1986
1'01"945	José Antonio Escuredo (ESP)	Quito (ECU)		Open air track	15 September 1995
1'00"613	Shane Kelly (AUS)	Bogotá (COL)		Open air track	26 September 1995
1'00"148	Arnaud Tournant (FRA)	Mexico City (MEX)		Open air track	16 June 2000
58"875	Arnaud Tournant (FRA)	La Paz (BOL)	Alto Irpavi	Open air track	10 October 2001
57"949*	Maximilian Levy (GER)	Aguascalientes (MEX)	Velódromo Bicentenario	Indoor track	7 December 2013
56"303	François Pervis (FRA)	Aguascalientes (MEX)	Velódromo Bicentenario	Indoor track	7 December 2013
55"433	Jeffrey Hoogland (NED)	Aguascalientes (MEX)	Velódromo Bicentenario	Indoor 250m wood track	31 October 2023
