= Leo Duyndam =

Dutch cyclist

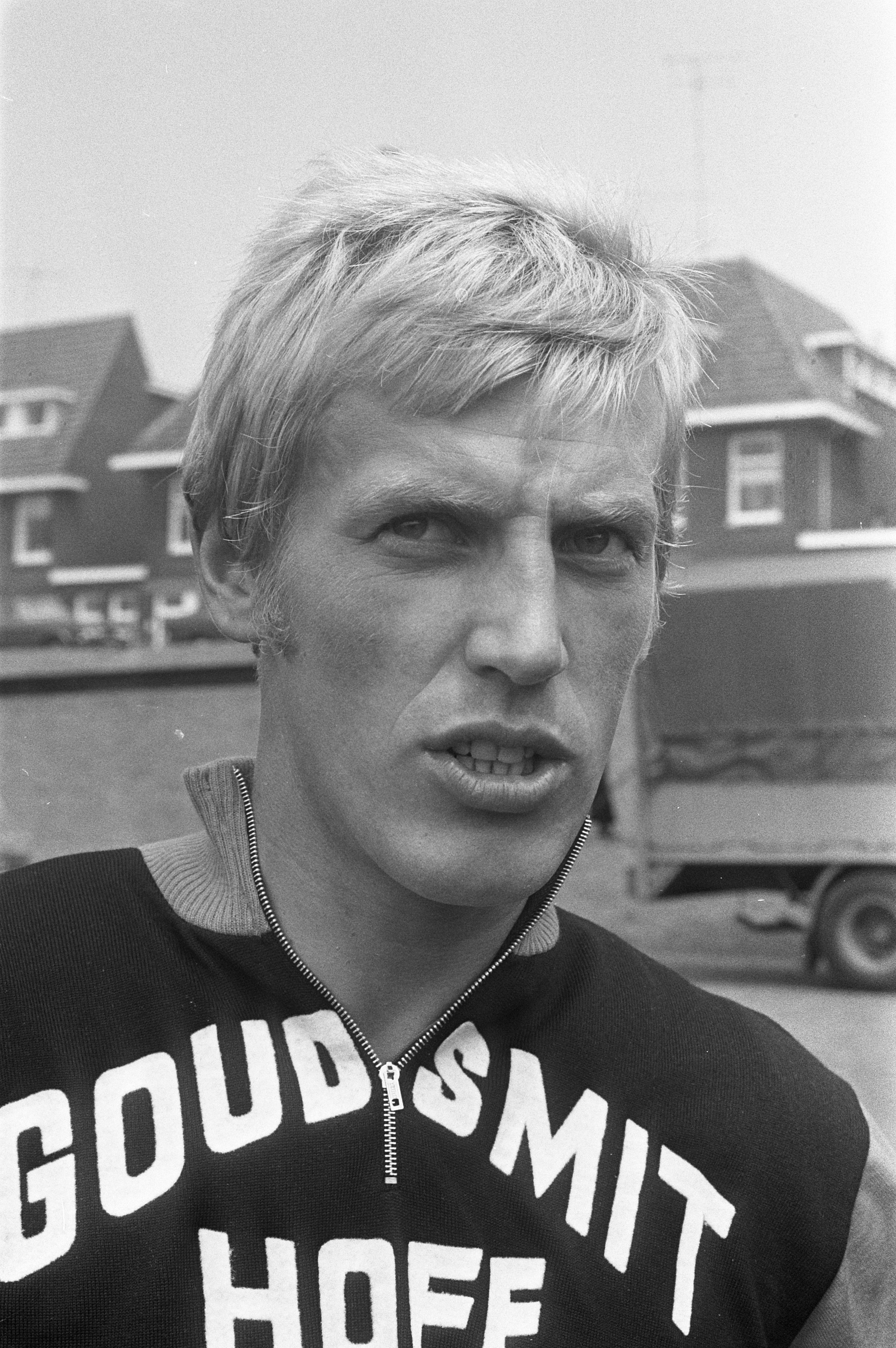

Personal information
- Full name: Leo Duyndam
- Born: 2 January 1948 Poeldijk, the Netherlands
- Died: 26 July 1990 (aged 42) Nice, France

Cycling career
- Sport: Cycling
- Discipline: Road/Track
- Role: Rider

Major wins
- 1 stage 1972 Tour de France

Leo Duyndam (Poeldijk, 2 January 1948 — Nice, France, 26 July 1990) was a Dutch professional road bicycle racer.

== Major results ==
1967
Omloop der Kempen
1968
Netherlands National Track Pursuit Championship
Ronde van Limburg
Six Days of Ghent (with Peter Post)
1969
Bladel
Elfstedenronde
Goirle
Honselersdijk
Ede
1970
Netherlands National Track Pursuit Championship
Schinnen
Lutlommel
Berner Rundfahrt
Rotterdam Coolsingel
1971
Six Days of Antwerp (with René Pijnen and Peter Post)
Arendonk
Polderpijl
Ulvenhout
Roden
Papendrecht
Arnhem
1972
Grave
Maaslandse Pijl
Neeroeteren
Polder-Kempen
Six Days of Rotterdam (with René Pijnen)
Six Days of Antwerp (with René Pijnen and Theo Verschueren)
Six Days of Berlin (with René Pijnen)
Six Days of Frankfurt (with Jürgen Tschan)
Tour de France:

Winner stage 6

1973
Berlare
European Track Madison Championship (with René Pijnen)
Six Days of Rotterdam (with René Pijnen)
Six Days of Antwerp (with Gerard Koel and René Pijnen)
Zomergem
Six Days of London (with Gerben Karstens)
Six Days of Munich (with René Pijnen)
Six Days of Zürich (with Piet de Wit)
1974
Netherlands National Track Omnium Championship
Profronde van Pijnacker
Rummen
Six Days of Bremen (with René Pijnen)
Six Days of Rotterdam (with René Pijnen)
Knokke
Koksijde
Six Days of Herning (with Ole Ritter)
1975
Six Days of Rotterdam (with Gerben Karstens)
Six Days of Herning (with Ole Ritter)
