= Graeme Gilmore =

Australian cyclist (born 1945)

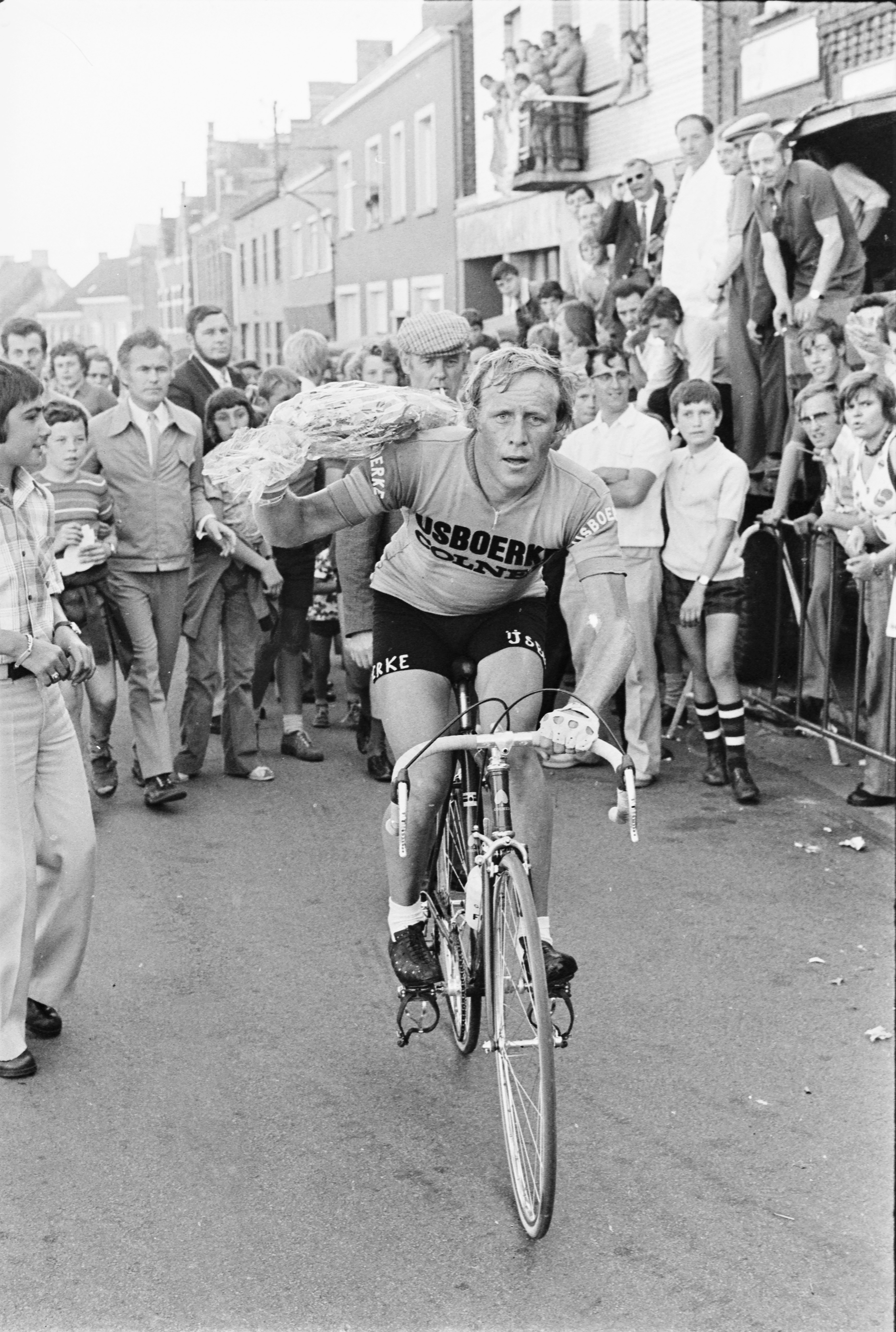
- Graeme Gilmore after winning the 1974 Grote Prijs Raf Jonckheere in Westrozebeke.

Personal information
- Full name: Graeme Gilmore
- Born: 29 June 1945 (age 81) Launceston, Tasmania, Australia

Cycling career
- Sport: Cycling
- Discipline: Track
- Role: Rider

Professional teams
- 1962–1967: Malvern Star Cycles
- 1968: Flandria - De Clerck - Krüger
- 1968–1969: Mackeson - Whitbread
- 1970: Mackeson - Condor
- 1970: Peycom - Visser
- 1971: Individual (Unknown)
- 1972: Bantel
- 1973: Falcon
- 1974: Munck - Beck's
- 1974–1975: IJsboerke - Colner
- 1976–1977: Lodewijcks Cycles

Graeme Gilmore (born 29 June 1945 in Launceston, Tasmania) is an Australian retired track cyclist. He is the father of Belgian racing cyclist Matthew Gilmore and brother in law of British racing cyclist Tom Simpson.

Gilmore started racing in November 1955 at the age of 10. He came second in his first race, a 1-mile event at York Park Track Launceston. He won his second race, the same month, again a 1-mile event at York Park Track. He won several juvenile and junior championships before beginning to compete for prize money at the age of 15, which in Australian at that time deemed him a professional.

In 1967 Gilmore was awarded both Australian Professional Road & Track Cyclist of the Year from "Road & Track" magazine readers, and became an inaugural member of the Tasmanian Sporting Hall of Fame. In the same year he won the Australian national road race title. Gilmore was awarded Australian Cyclist of the Year 1972.

Gilmore was a successful track rider on the European Six-day racing scene.

== Palmarès ==
1960
1st 1 mile, Tasmanian Track Championship, Junior Pro
1st 5 mile, Tasmanian Track Championship, Junior Pro
1st Sprint, Tasmanian Track Championship, Junior Pro
1st Tasmanian Championship, Road, Junior Pro

1961
2nd Australian National Road Race Championships, Junior Pro

1962
3rd Burnie Wheelrace, Australia
1st Latrobe, 2 Mile Handicap Race, Australia
1st 1 Mile, Australian National Track Championships - Junior Pro
1st 5 Mile, Australian National Track Championships - Junior Pro
1st Team Pursuit, Australian National Track Championships - Junior Pro
1st Sprint, Australian National Track Championships - Junior Pro

1963
3rd Burnie Wheelrace, Australia
2nd Scratch race, Australian National Track Championships
2nd Sprint, Australian National Track Championships
1st Panton Memorial, Australia
1st 1 mile, Tasmanian Championship, Track, Pro
1st 5 mile, Tasmanian Championship, Track, Pro
1st 2 mile Handicap Race, Latrobe, Australia

1964
1st Burnie, Scratch, Australia
1st Devonport, Scratch, Australia
1st Latrobe, Scratch, Australia
1st Panton Memorial, Australia
1st 2 mile Handicap Race, Burnie, Australia
1st 2 mile Handicap Race, Latrobe, Australia

1965
2nd Launceston Six Day, Australia
1st Panton Memorial, Australia

1966
1st 2 Mile Handicap Race, Devonport, Australia
2nd General Classification, Herald Sun Tour

1st Stage 1, Charlton
1st Stage 4, Deneliquin
1st Stage 5, Finley (New South Wales)
1st Stage 9, Lilydale

2nd Pursuit, Australian National Track Championships
2nd Sprint, Australian National Track Championships

1967
1st General Classification Tour of the Peninsular, Australia
Herald Sun Tour:

1st Stage 3, Mayborough
1st Stage 5, Moe (Victoria)
1st Stage 6, Warragul (Victoria)
1st Stage 9, Lilydale

1st København Paar, Omnium, Denmark (with Danny Clark)
1st Launceston, Six Days, Australia (with Sid Patterson)
1st Melbourne - Warrnambool
1st Melbourne Ron Edminson Wheelrace, 2 mile Handicap Race
1st Melbourne Stan Mullaney Wheelrace, 2 mile Handicap Race
1st Melbourne, Sprint, Australia
1st 1 Mile, Australian National Track Championships
2nd Pursuit, Australian National Track Championships
1st Australian National Road Race Championships
1st 25 mile, Tasmanian Road Championship
1st 50 mile, Tasmanian Road Championship
Tour of the Peninsular, Australia:

1st Stage 1, Cranbourne (Victoria)
1st Stage 2, Rosebud (Victoria)
1st Stage 3, Sorrento (Victoria)

1st 125 mile, Victorian Road Championships, Australia
1st 150 mile, Victorian Road Championships, Australia
1st 2 mile Handicap Race, Devonport, Australia

1968
3rd Launceston Six Day, Australia

1969
3rd London Six Day, Great Britain
3rd Rotterdam Six Day, The Netherlands
2nd Tom Simpson Memorial, Great Britain

1970
1st Stage 1 V&G Series, Middlesbrough, Great Britain
1st Bonus Series, Great Britain
3rd Six Days of Ghent, Belgium
3rd Groningen Six Day, The Netherlands
1st General Classification V&G Series, Great Britain

1st Stage 3, Nottingham
1st Stage 5, Birmingham

2nd Weston Super Mare Grand Prix, Great Britain

1971
3rd Madison, European Track Championships, Elite

1972
1st Civitavecchia, Sprint, Italy
1st 2 mile Handicap Race, Devonport, Australia
1st Dortmund, Sprint, Germany
2nd Derny, European Track Championships, Elite
3rd Six Days of Ghent, Belgium
2nd Groningen Six Day, The Netherlands
1st Napoli, Sprint, Italy
1st Zürich Six Day, Switzerland (with Albert Fritz & Wilfried Peffgen)
3rd Rotterdam Six Day, The Netherlands
3rd Antwerp Six Day, Belgium
6th Oostburg, The Netherlands

1973
2nd Berlin Six Day, Germany
1st Bremen Six Day, Germany (with Dieter Kemper)
2nd Dortmund Six Day, Germany
3rd Frankfurt Six Day, Germany
1st Ghent, Omnium, Belgium (with Patrick Sercu)
1st Ghent, Madison, Belgium (with Patrick Sercu)
1st Six Days of Ghent, Belgium (with Patrick Sercu)
1st Köln, Sprint, Germany
1st Los Angeles Six Day, USA (with Klaus Bugdahl)
3rd Waldenbuch, Germany
2nd Antwerp, Six Day, Belgium
3rd Maldegem, Belgium
2nd München Six Day, Germany

1974
1st Omnium, Canadian Professional Open Track event, Toronto
3rd Derny, European Track Championships, Elite
1st Omnium, European Track Championships, Elite
2nd Madison, European Track Championships, Elite
1st Ghent, Omnium, Belgium (with Patrick Sercu)
1st Ghent, Madison, Belgium (with Patrick Sercu)
1st Köln Six Day, Germany (with Dieter Kemper)
1st München Six Day, Germany (with Sigi Renz)
1st Zürich Six Day, Switzerland (with Klaus Bugdahl)
3rd Bremen Six Day, Germany
1st Westrozebeke, Belgium
1st Six Days of Ghent, Belgium (with Julien Stevens)

1975
1st Dortmund Six Day, Germany (with Dieter Kemper)
2nd Derny, European Track Championships, Elite
2nd Six Days of Ghent, Belgium
2nd Antwerp Six Day, Belgium
3rd Stage 7a, Paris–Nice
3rd Herning Six Day, Denmark

1976
3rd Bremen Six Day, Germany
3rd Six Days of Ghent, Belgium
2nd München Six Day, Germany
1st Maastricht Six Day, Maastricht (Limburg), The Netherlands (with Patrick Sercu)
1st Copenhagen Six Day, Denmark (with Dieter Kemper)
3rd Antwerp Six Day, Belgium
