= Dieter Kemper =

German cyclist (1937–2018)

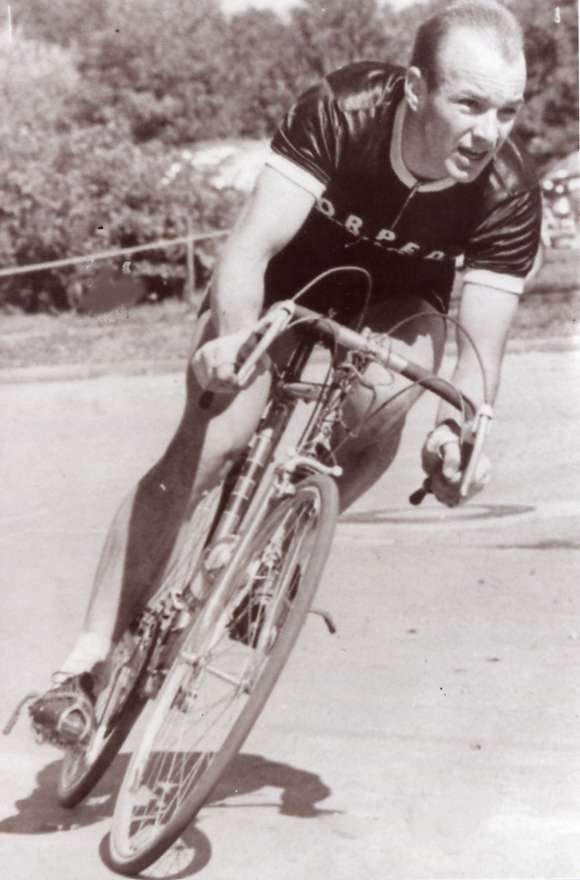
- Dieter Kemper in the 1960s

Personal information
- Born: 11 August 1937 Dortmund, Germany
- Died: 11 October 2018 (aged 81) Julianadorp, the Netherlands

Sport
- Sport: Cycling
Medal record
Representing West Germany
World Championships
Bronze medal – third place	1965 San Sebastián	Individual pursuit
Bronze medal – third place	1966 Frankfurt	Individual pursuit
Bronze medal – third place	1972 Marseille	Motor-paced, professionals
Gold medal – first place	1975 Rocourt	Motor-paced, professionals

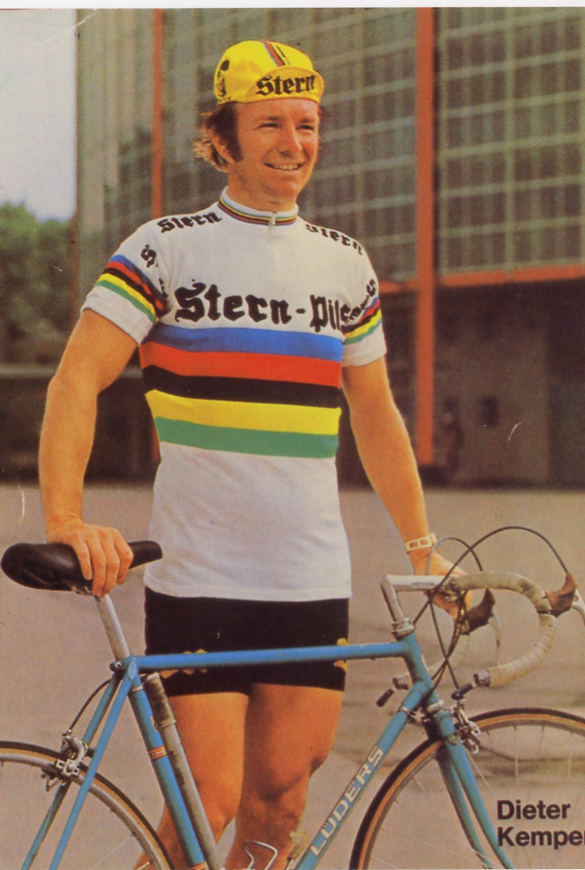
Dieter Kemper in 1975

Dieter Kemper (11 August 1937 – 11 October 2018) was a German cyclist who competed professionally between 1961 and 1980. During his career he won one UCI Motor-paced World Championships in 1975, seven European titles and 26 six-day road races. He finished three times in third place at world championships, in motor-paced racing and individual pursuit disciplines.

Before starting to train in cycling in 1957 he was a successful water polo player with SV Westphalia in Dortmund. In 1961 he started in the Tour de France but had to withdraw early due to a crash.

He had another bad crash on 5 December 1976 during a motor-paced race in Cologne, when he was hit hard in the head and spent nine days in a coma.

After retiring from cycling he moved to North Holland with his wife, who later died of brain tumor in 2008.

Six-day races
No.	Year	Place	Partner
1	1964	Münster	Horst Oldenburg
2	1965	Berlin	Rudi Altig
3	1965	Frankfurt	Rudi Altig
4	1966	Cologne	Rudi Altig
5	1966	Bremen	Rudi Altig
6	1966	Münster	Horst Oldenburg
7	1967	Berlin	Horst Oldenburg
8	1967	Melbourne	Horst Oldenburg
9	1967	Dortmund	Horst Oldenburg
10	1968	Melbourne	Leandro Faggin
11	1969	Cologne	Horst Oldenburg
12	1969	Milaan	Horst Oldenburg
13	1969	Berlin	Klaus Bugdahl
14	1969	Zurich	Klaus Bugdahl
15	1970	Milan	Norbert Seeuws
16	1971	Groningen	Klaus Bugdahl
17	1971	Dortmund	Klaus Bugdahl
18	1971	Münster	Klaus Bugdahl
19	1971	Zurich	Klaus Bugdahl
20	1972	Groningen	Klaus Bugdahl
21	1973	Bremen	Graeme Gilmore
22	1974	Keulen	Graeme Gilmore
23	1974	Castelgomberto	Marino Basso
24	1975	Dortmund	Graeme Gilmore
25	1976	Keulen	Wilfried Peffgen
26	1976	Copenhagen	Graeme Gilmore
