= Romain De Loof =

Belgian cyclist

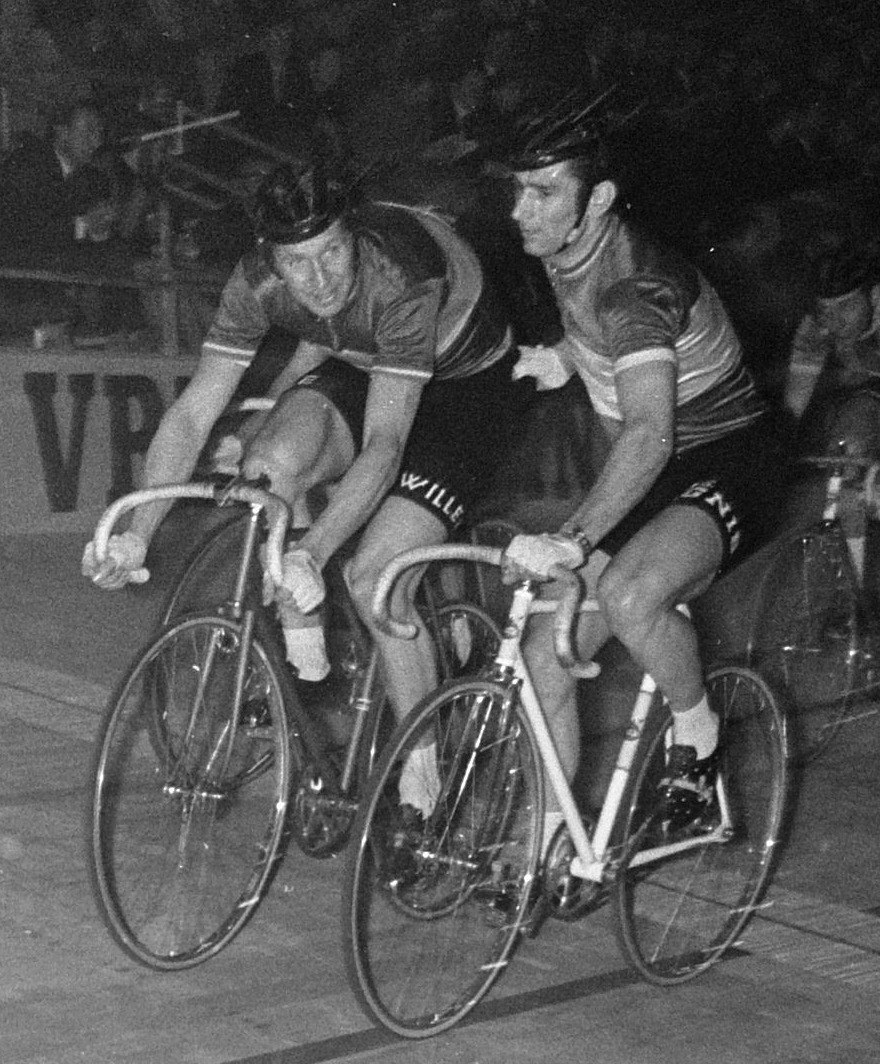
- Peter Post and Romain De Loof (right) in 1969

Personal information
- Born: 6 March 1941 (age 85) Eeklo, Belgium
- Height: 1.80 m (5 ft 11 in)
- Weight: 75 kg (165 lb)

Sport
- Sport: Cycling
Medal record
Representing Belgium
Motor-paced World Championships
Gold medal – first place	1962 Mailand	Amateurs
Gold medal – first place	1963 Liege	Amateurs
Silver medal – second place	1965 San Sebastian	Professionals
Gold medal – first place	1966 Frankfurt	Professionals
Silver medal – second place	1967 Amsterdam	Professionals

Romain De Loof (born 6 March 1941) is a retired Belgian cyclist. After winning the UCI Motor-paced World Championships in 1962 and 1963 in the amateurs category, he turned professional and won another three medals in 1965–1967, including one gold. He also competed at the 1960 Summer Olympics in the 4000m team pursuit but failed to reach the final.

Between 1965 and 1970 he competed in 56 six-day track races, winning in Milan (1965; with Rik Van Steenbergen), Amsterdam and Rotterdam (both 1969; both with Peter Post). After a crash in the race of Gent-Wevelgem in 1970, he suffered a triple fracture of the pelvis and had to pause for a year. He finally retired in 1975 and later acted as the manager of professional cycling teams Ebo-Cinzia en Marc-Zeepcentrale. In February 2010, he received a medal for services to the city of Eeklo.
