= Donald Allan =

Australian cyclist (born 1949)

Personal information
- Born: 24 September 1949 (age 77) Melbourne, Australia

Cycling career
- Sport: Cycling

Donald John Allan (born 24 September 1949) is an Australian former cyclist who rode at the Olympic Games and Tour de France.

Allan began cycling with the Blackburn Cycling Club in Melbourne. In 1970, he was paralysed in a car accident, breaking his back and fracturing his sacrum and pelvis. He returned to compete in the individual road race and team time trial events at the 1972 Summer Olympics.

In 1973, Allan rode in the big amateur races across Europe and won stages in cycling's version of the Cold War Tour de France, the Peace Race, as well as the Tour of Austria, Tour of Scotland, and multiple criteria in Holland and kermesses in Belgium. In November 1973, he was offered a pro contract with Dutch team Frisol. He rode in the 1974 Tour de France as a domestique for Frisol and finished 103rd. In the 1975 Tour de France, he finished 85th.

In 1976 Allan finished 9th in the 1976 UCI Road World Championships in Italy.

Allan with Danny Clark were the fifth most successful team in Six-day racing history with 15 wins, 15 second places, 11 third places and 12 fourth places off 71 starts.

Another fractured pelvis and other injuries effectively ended his career.
