= Gert Frank =

Danish cyclist (1956–2019)

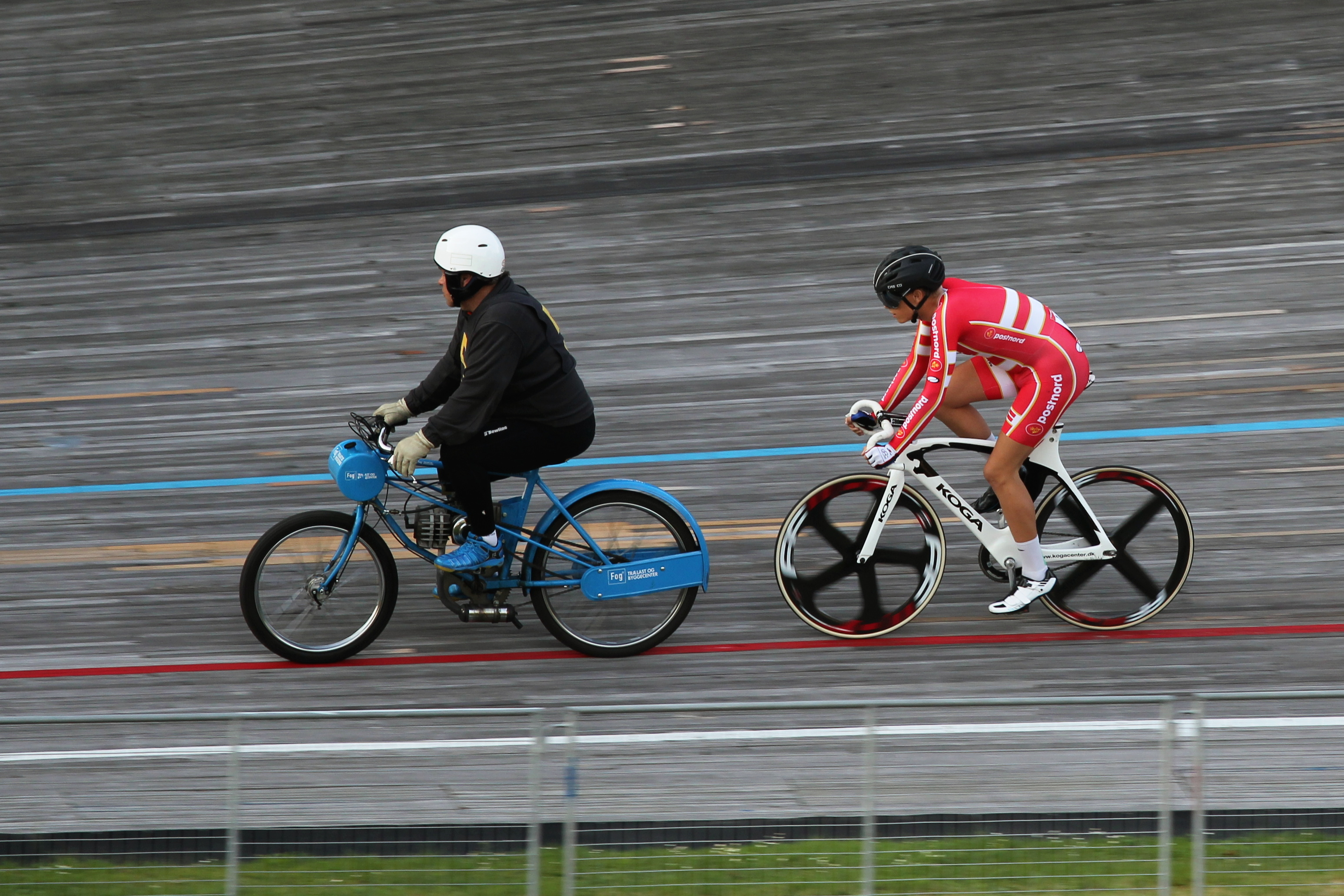
- Gert Frank (left) and Martin Frank in 2015

Personal information
- Born: 15 March 1956 Hobro, Nordjylland, Denmark
- Died: 19 January 2019 (aged 62)

Cycling career
- Sport: Cycling
Medal record
Representing DEN
Men's cycling
Olympic Games
Bronze medal – third place	1976 Montreal	Team time trial

Gert Frank (15 March 1956 – 19 January 2019) was a cyclist and Olympic medalist from Denmark.

== Amateur ==
Frank won the bronze medal in the Team Time Trial event at the 1976 Summer Olympics in Montreal, alongside Verner Blaudzun, Jørgen Hansen and Jørn Lund.

== Professional ==
Frank was predominantly a track cyclist and won 20 indoor Six-day racing events, including the 1981 Six Days of Ghent race with Patrick Sercu. He also won the Madison at the European Track Championships in 1981 and 1983 (with Hans-Henrik Ørsted) and in 1985 (with René Pijnen). Additionally he won the European Derny championship in 1984.
