= Sigi Renz =

German cyclist (1938–2025)

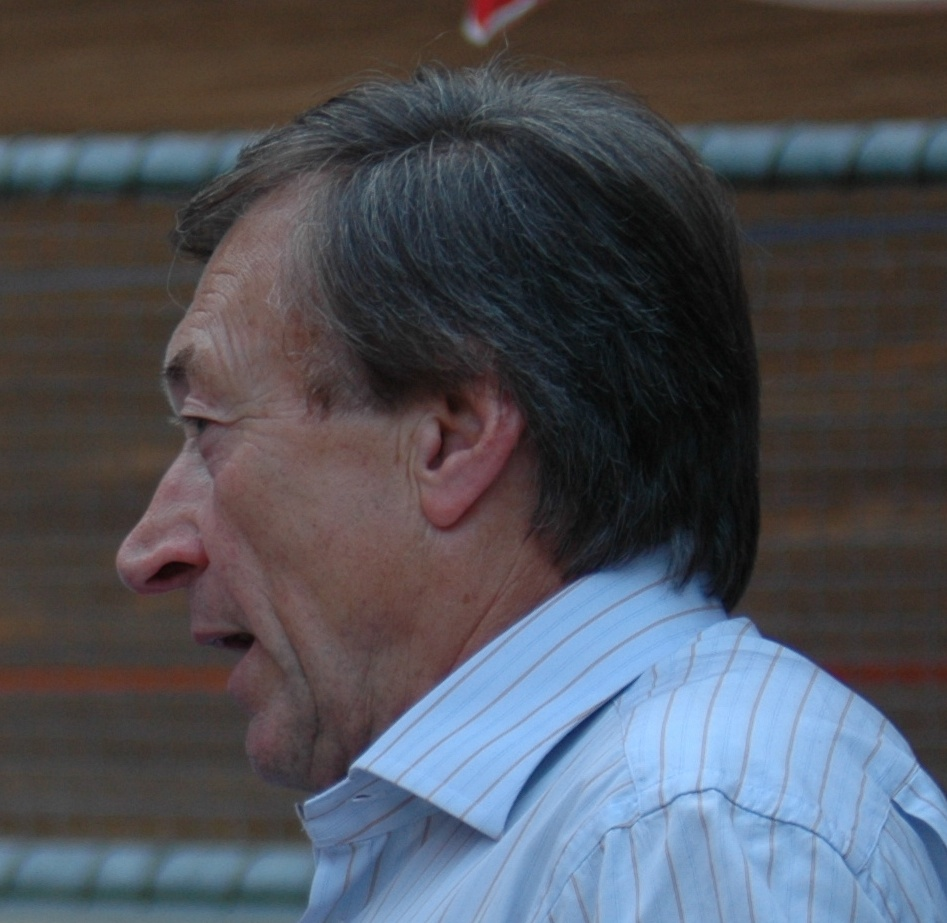
- Renz in 2006

Personal information
- Born: 2 August 1938 Munich, Gau Munich-Upper Bavaria, Germany
- Died: 1 February 2025 (aged 86) Regensburg, Bavaria, Germany

Cycling career
- Sport: Cycling
- Role: Rider

Sigi Renz (2 August 1938 – 1 February 2025) was a German racing cyclist. He won the German National Road Race in 1963. Renz died of cancer in Regensburg on 1 February 2025, at the age of 86.
