= Klaus Bugdahl =

German cyclist (1934–2023)

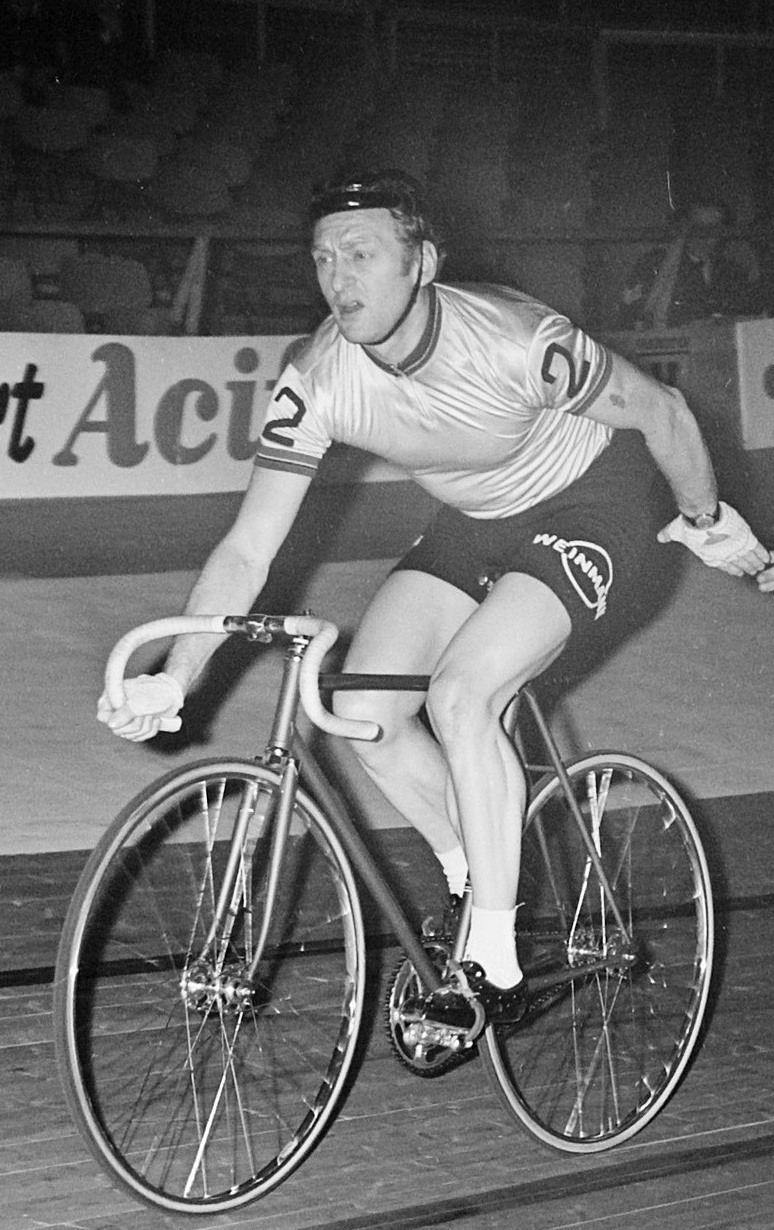
- Bugdahl in 1969

Personal information
- Born: 24 November 1934 Berlin, Germany
- Died: August 2023 (aged 88) Wiesbaden, Hesse, Germany

Sport
- Sport: Cycling
Medal record
Representing Germany
UEC European Track Championships
Gold medal – first place	1962	Madison
Silver medal – second place	1962	Derny
Silver medal – second place	1964	Madison
Gold medal – first place	1966	Madison
Bronze medal – third place	1968	Madison
Bronze medal – third place	1969	Madison
Gold medal – first place	1971	Madison
Bronze medal – third place	1976	Madison

Klaus Bugdahl (24 November 1934 – August 2023) was a German cyclist who was active between 1954 and 1978 both on the road and track. He won the West German National Road Race in 1958.

On the track, he won several medals at European championships, mostly in the madison event, and competed in 228 six-day races and won 37 of them, nearly all in his native Germany, which places him as one of the ten most successful racers. He completed his last six-day race in 1978 in Milan, aged 43. His racing partners included Eddy Merckx, Patrick Sercu, Rolf Wolfshohl, Rudi Altig, Dieter Kemper and Rik Van Steenbergen.

Bugdahl died in August 2023, at the age of 88.
