= Wilfried Peffgen =

German cyclist (1942–2021)

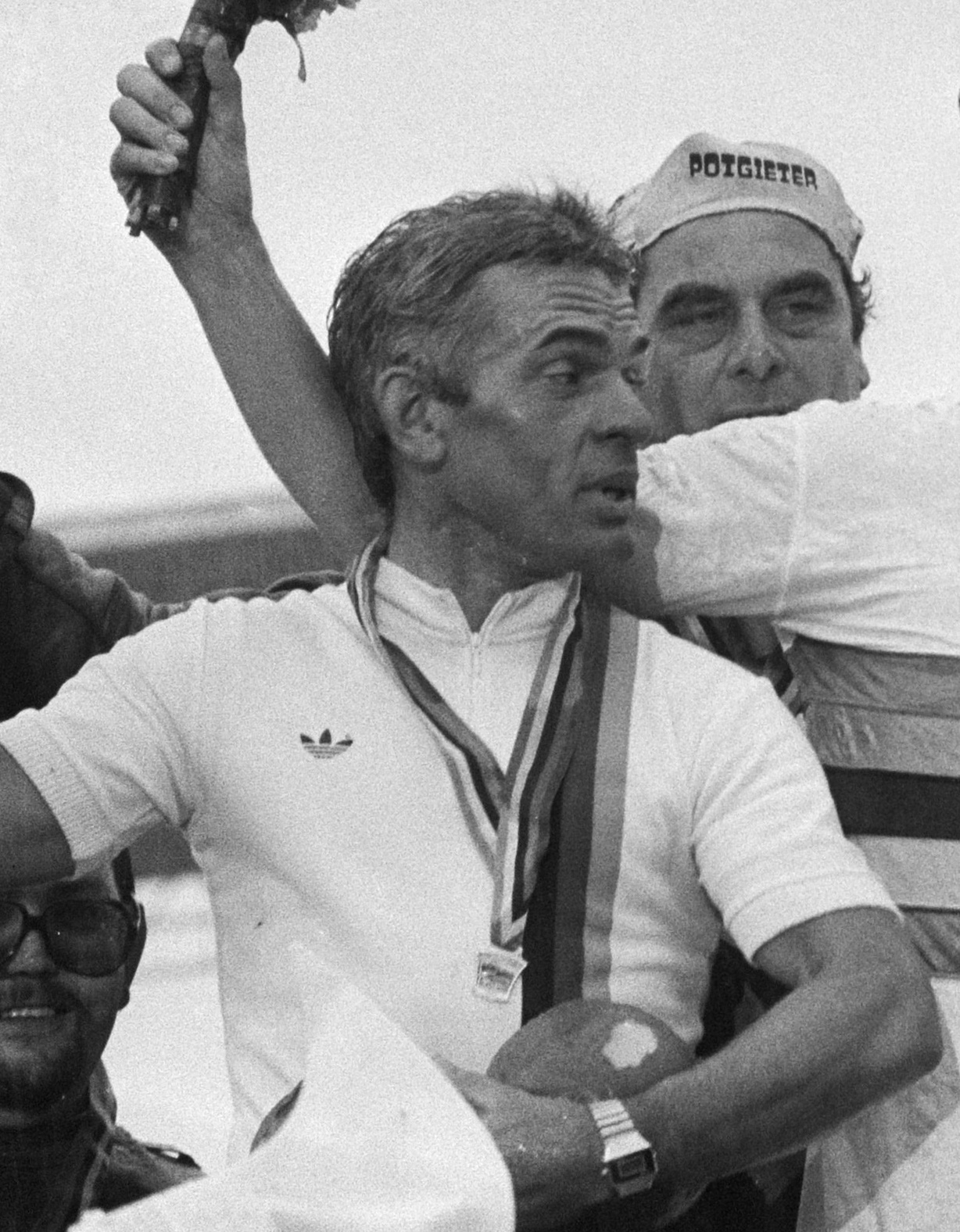
- Peffgen at the world championships in 1979

Personal information
- Born: 1 October 1942 Cologne, Germany
- Died: 11 May 2021 (aged 78) Cologne, Germany
- Height: 1.73 m (5 ft 8 in)
- Weight: 67 kg (148 lb)

Sport
- Sport: Cycling
- Club: RRC Günther, Köln
Medal record
Representing West Germany
UCI Motor-paced World Championships
Gold medal – first place	1976 Monteroni	Professionals
Gold medal – first place	1978 Munich	Professionals
Gold medal – first place	1980 Besancon	Professionals
Silver medal – second place	1977 San Cristobal	Professionals
Silver medal – second place	1979 Amsterdam	Professionals
Silver medal – second place	1982 Leicester	Professionals
Bronze medal – third place	1981 Brno	Professionals

Wilfried Peffgen (1 October 1942 – 11 May 2021) was a German cyclist who was active between 1959 and 1983.

== Biography ==
He won a medal at every UCI Motor-paced World Championships between 1976 and 1982, including three gold medals in 1976, 1978 and 1980. He also won eight European titles in 1971, 1973 and 1976–1981.

As a road cyclist, he competed at the 1964 Summer Olympics in the individual road race and finished in sixth place. The next year, he turned professional. During his career, he took part in 188 six-day races, winning 16 of them, finishing in second place 41 times, and in third place 29 times. He competed four times in the Tour de France with Rudi Altig, in 1967, 1969, 1972 and 1973. He won the German National Road Race in 1972.

After retirement from racing, he ran a bicycle shop in his native Cologne and until 2009 served as director of the six-day race of Dortmund.
