= Daryl Perkins =

Australian track cyclist

Personal information
- Born: 20 April 1943 (age 83) Victoria, Australia
- Height: 1.75 m (5 ft 9 in)
- Weight: 76 kg (168 lb)

Cycling career
- Sport: Cycling
- Discipline: Track
- Role: Rider
- Rider type: Sprint

Amateur teams
- (from at least 2002–): Carnegie Caulfield Club
- 2008: Maillot Jaune
Medal record
Men's track cycling
Representing Australia
Commonwealth Games
Bronze medal – third place	1966 Kingston	Sprint

Daryl William Perkins (born 20 April 1943) is a former Australian professional track cyclist.

== Biography ==
Perkins was born and lives in the state of Victoria, Australia. He was a sprint, tandem and six-day rider.

Perkins teamed with Ian Browne to win the tandem sprint at the Australian National Track Championships. That qualified them to compete at the 1964 Summer Olympics in Tokyo. They were knocked out of the tandem sprint in the quarter-final by the Soviet Union and came fifth.

In 1966, Perkins won the bronze medal in the 1000m sprint at the British Empire and Commonwealth Games in Kingston, Jamaica, finishing behind Roger Gibbon and Jim Booker.

Perkins took over a hotel in Ararat in 2004. He is also involved in Derny piloting and is a commissaire.

He is the father of track cyclist Shane Perkins.

During 2018 Six Days of Berlin, he flew to watch his son Shane race and was infected with Meningococcal meningitis, which can cause permanent disabilities or even death. A GoFundMe fundraising campaign organized by Six Day Series exceeded its target of 20,000 euros due to the support of the German public. He was cured after 6 weeks, then returning to Australia for further recovery. Shane Perkins was grateful for the reception and raced again in the 2019 Six Days of Berlin.
