= Shane Perkins =

Australian-Russian track cyclist

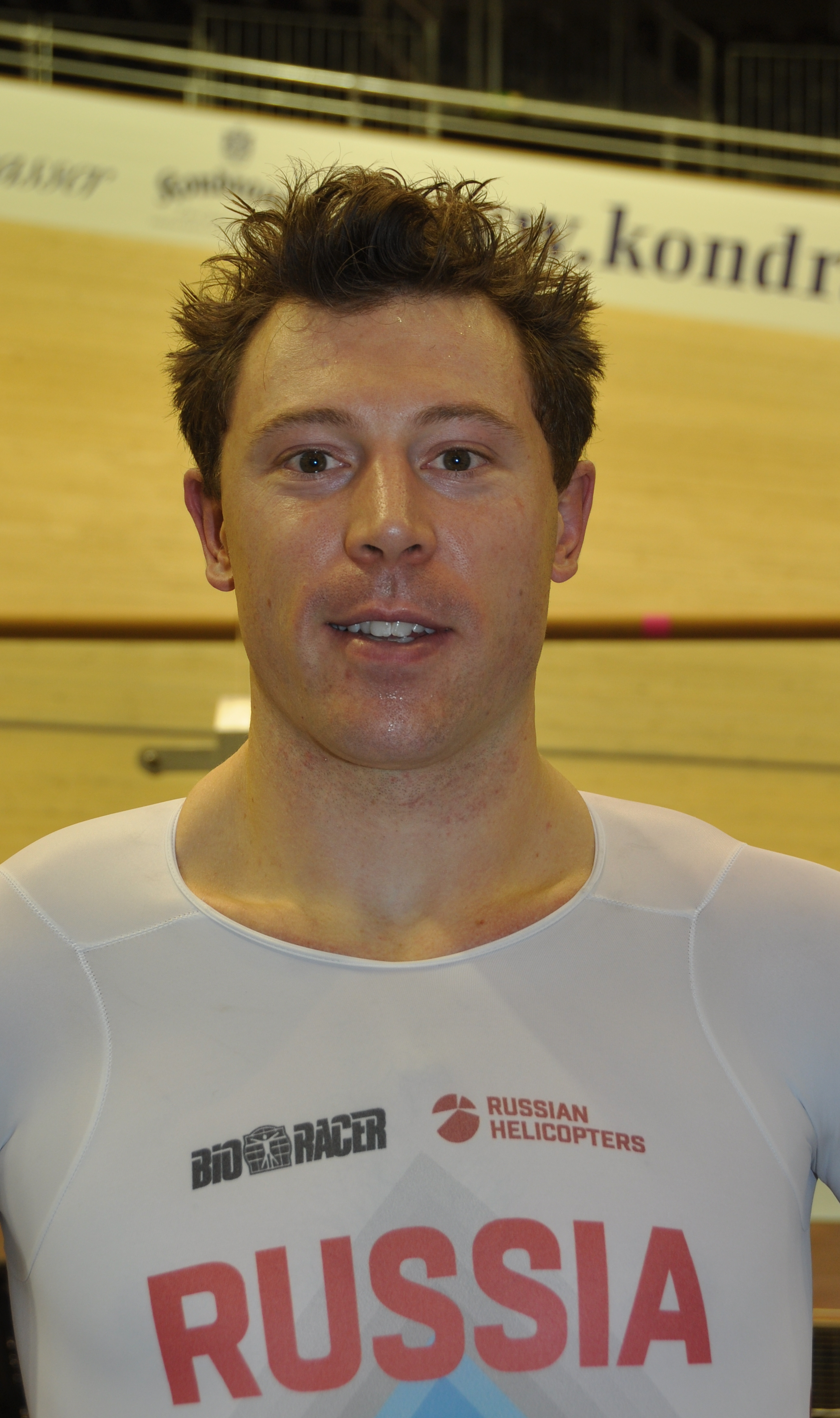
- Shane Perkins (2018)

Personal information
- Nickname: Perko
- Born: 30 December 1986 (age 39) Melbourne, Australia

Cycling career
- Sport: Cycling
- Discipline: Track
- Role: Rider
- Rider type: Sprint

Professional teams
- 2007–2016: Team Jayco – Australia
- 2017–: Gazprom - RusVelo
Medal record
Representing Australia
Men's track cycling
Summer Olympics
Bronze medal – third place	2012 London	Sprint
World Championships
Gold medal – first place	2011 Apeldoorn	Keirin
Gold medal – first place	2012 Melbourne	Team sprint
Silver medal – second place	2010 Ballerup	Sprint
Bronze medal – third place	2006 Bordeaux	Team sprint
Commonwealth Games
Gold medal – first place	2010 Delhi	Sprint
Bronze medal – third place	2006 Melbourne	Team sprint
Bronze medal – third place	2014 Glasgow	Team sprint
Representing Russia
Men's track cycling
European Championships
Silver medal – second place	2017 Berlin	Keirin

Shane Perkins (Russian: Шейн Перкинс; born 30 December 1986) is an Australian and Russian (since 17 August 2017) professional track cyclist.

== Biography ==
=== Early life ===
Perkins was born in Melbourne, the son of Daryl Perkins. As a youngster, Perkins played cricket, football and basketball. He played basketball at a very high level aged 7 to 14, but did not enjoy it enough to continue. Perkins rode BMX for a short while and began cycling aged 13 in 1999 with his father, who had himself been a successful cyclist.

His first cycling club was the Carnegie Caulfield Cycling Club, and his first medal was won at the Victoria state championships at Northcote, it was a gold medal in the sprint event, where he beat friend and rival Michael Ford. Within three months of taking up cycling, he had qualified to compete at the U15 Australian National Championships in Sydney, there he won two gold medals and broke two Australian records in the process. He went on to win 11 further National Championship titles between then and 2006, and broke another two Australian records. He is an Australian Institute of Sport and Victorian Institute of Sport scholarship holder.

=== 2004: Junior World championships ===
In Los Angeles in 2004, Perkins became the sprint and keirin junior World Champion. He tested positive for methamphetamine following the Keirin final on 29 July, his case was heard in front of the Court of Arbitration for Sport in November 2004. The Court took into account extenuating circumstances, accepting that Perkins had used a stimulant inadvertently. A Cycling Australia statement said: "In America Perkins purchased a nasal inhaler of the same brand he regularly uses in Australia without realising it contained a different active ingredient, namely methamphetamine, which is on the banned list," Perkins' suspension ran for six months, from 16 November 2004.

=== Commonwealth Games ===
Perkins was reselected to represent Australia at the 2006 Commonwealth Games in his hometown, Melbourne. He won a bronze medal as part of Australia's team sprint squad, becoming the youngest ever Australian cyclist to win a Commonwealth Games medal. He then went on to represent his country and claim the gold medal in the Men's individual sprint event at the 2010 Commonwealth Games in Delhi. His 2010 Commonwealth Games were not completely successful, however, as he was disqualified from the semifinal of the men's keirin. Relegated to the 7-12 place race, he swore at the judges as he crossed the finishing line. He later apologised and withdrew from the men's team sprint. At the 2014 Commonwealth Games, he was part of the team that won the bronze medal in the men's team sprint.

=== London 2012 ===
Perkins qualified for the 2012 London Summer Olympics. Perkins competed in the Men's Sprint, Men's Keirin, and Men's Team Sprint. He was part of the Australian sprint team that finished 4th, finished 5th in the keirin but won the bronze medal in the individual sprint.

=== Since 2015: Out of Australian team and acquirement of the Russian citizenship, first European medal ===
Since 2015, Perkins was not considered to be a candidate to the Australian international team, in particular, he missed the 2016 Summer Olympics. On 15 February 2017, it was announced that Perkins was in the process of acquiring Russian citizenship with the goal to race for the Russian team at the 2020 Summer Olympics.

In August 2017, Perkins was granted Russian citizenship. At the national championships, Perkins won gold with the Moscow team. He then won bronze in the individual sprint event, losing in the semifinals to eventual champion Pavel Yakushevskiy. He beat Alexey Tkachev in the bronze medal match. Perkins later also won gold in the keirin discipline.

Perkins debuted at the European Championships in Berlin, Germany. He participated in the team sprint and keirin event. His team consisting of Pavel Yakushevskiy and Denis Dmitriev took the fourth place after losing the bronze medal race to the Dutch. In the keirin event, Perkins won his first European silver medal, losing only to the German Maximilian Levy.

=== After 2017 ===
The Tokyo 2020 Olympics were delayed by one year and took place in 2021, with heavy restrictions on participation of Russian athletes. By that time, Perkins lost interest in competitive cycling and, together with his wife Kristine, took up bodybuilding.

== Personal life ==
In February 2008, tension was brewing between Perkins and his rival for Olympic selection, Ryan Bayley. Both were deemed by the judges to be riding improperly at the Australian National Track Championships. Bayley crashed when Perkins moved down on him during a race, burning a hole in the back of his skinsuit. The relationship between the two riders was given another dimension, when Perkins announced his engagement to Bayley's younger sister, Kristine Bayley.

Perkins and Kristine Bayley had a son, Aidan, in October 2008. They were married in November 2009.

During 2018 Six Days of Berlin, his father Daryl Perkins who flew to watch him race was infected with Meningococcal meningitis, which could cause permanent disabilities or death. A GoFundMe fundraising campaign organized by Six Day Series exceeded target of 20,000 euros under support of German public. His father was treated in Germany for 6 weeks and then returned to Australia for further recovery. He was grateful of the reception and decided to race again in 2019 Six Days of Berlin.

As of 2022, Perkins and his family were living in Perth. He was running a bodybuilding training center together with Kristine.

== Major results ==
2003
1st Kilo, Australian National Track Championships, Juniors
1st Sprint, Australian National Track Championships, Juniors

2004
1st Keirin, World Championships, Juniors
3rd Team Sprint, World Championships, Juniors
1st Sprint, World Championships, Juniors
2nd Kilo, Australian National Track Championships, Juniors
1st Sprint, Australian National Track Championships, Juniors

2006
3rd Team Sprint, World Cup, Los Angeles
3rd Team Sprint, Australian National Track Championships
2nd Keirin, Australian National Track Championships
3rd Team Sprint, Commonwealth Games
3rd Team Sprint, World Championships (with Ryan Bayley & Shane Kelly)
3rd Sprint, Oceania Games, Melbourne
1st Team Sprint, Oceania Games, Melbourne (with Scott Sunderland & Joel Leonard)

2007
3rd Keirin, World Cup, Los Angeles
3rd Sprint, Australian National Track Championships
1st Team Sprint, Australian National Track Championships (with Mark French & Joel Leonard)
2nd Keirin, Australian National Track Championships
1st Keirin, World Cup, Manchester
3rd Team Sprint, World Cup, Manchester
2nd Sprint, Oceania Championships, Invercargill
3rd Keirin, Oceania Championships, Invercargill

2008
3rd Sprint, Australian National Track Championships
1st Team Sprint, Australian National Track Championships (with Mark French & Shane Kelly)
2nd Sprint, World Cup, Manchester
1st Sprint, World Cup, Melbourne

2009
3rd Sprint, World Cup, Beijing
1st Keirin Oceania Championships AUS
1st Team Sprint Oceania Championships AUS
1st Keirin Australian Championships SA
1st Sprint Australian Championships SA
1st Team Sprint Australian Championships SA
1st Kilometre Time Trial Australian Championships SA
1st Austral Wheelrace VIC

2010
1st Sprint, Commonwealth Games

2011
1st Keirin, World Championships

2012
1st Team sprint, World Championships

2014
3rd Team sprint, Commonwealth Games

2017
1st Team sprint, Russian Track Cycling Championships
3rd Sprint, Russian Track Cycling Championships
1st Keirin, Russian Track Cycling Championships
2nd Keirin, European Championships
