= 2018–19 Six Day Series =

2018–2019 Six Day Series
- Third edition of the Six Day Series

Details
- Dates: 23 October 2018 – 14 April 2019
- Location: London; Berlin; Copenhagen; Melbourne; Hong Kong; Manchester; Brisbane
- Races: 7

The 2018–19 Six Day Series (also known as the Six Day Cycling Series is a multi six-day track cycling race tournament over a season. It is the 3rd series organised by the Madison Sports Group (MSG). This season consists of 7 events across 5 countries.

It was the first edition of the World Cup to feature countries in Asia-Pacific. With two events held in Melbourne and Brisbane as the final in Australia. In January 2019, Hong Kong was announced as a new stage to introduce 6-day racing in Asia as the latest frontier. Those three stages were raced during 3-day weekends instead of the standard 6-day format.

== Series ==
In August 2018 the MSG revealed the location and dates of the Six Day Series meetings for the season. Six rounds were scheduled in London, United Kingdom; Berlin, Germany; Copenhagen, Denmark; Melbourne, Australia; Manchester and Brisbane. In January, a round in Hong Kong was added into the schedule.

=== London, United Kingdom ===
Round 1 was held at the Lee Valley VeloPark, on October 23-28 October 2018. Completed in 2011, the velodrome was the site of the 2012 Olympic Games and 2012 Paralympic Games track events. It has hosted the UCI Track Cycling World Cup (2011-12, 2014-15), and the 2016 UCI Track Cycling World Championships. The 6750-capacity velodrome has also been used for the British Revolution track series, British National Track Championships and was the site of Sir Bradley Wiggins' successful Hour Record ride in 2015.

=== Berlin, Germany ===
Round 2, to be held in Velodrom from January 24-29 January 2019. The velodrome was designed by internationally renowned French architect Dominique Perrault for Berlin's 2000 Olympic Games bid. It was built in 1997 on the site of the former Werner-Seelenbinder-Halle. Since opening, it has played host to the 2017 European Track Championships, the 1998 UCI Track Cycling World Cup Classics and the 1999 UCI Track Cycling World Championships. Since 1997, the traditional Six Days of Berlin has also taken place here. In preparation for the 2017 European Track Championships, the track was rebuilt.

=== Copenhagen, Denmark ===
Denmark's Ballerup Super Arena is situated in the capital. It will host the third round, on January 31-February 5. The velodrome was completed in 2001 and hosted the 2002 UCI Track Cycling World Championships and 2010 UCI Track Cycling World Championships. It can hold 6,500 spectators.

=== Melbourne, Australia ===
The fourth round will be hosted on between 7-9 February at the Melbourne Arena. It hosted the UCI Track Cycling World Championships (2004, 2012), in addition to the 2006 Commonwealth Games track events and numerous rounds of the UCI Track World Cup.

=== Hong Kong ===
The fifth round of this Six Day Series will be hosted in Hong Kong between 8-10 March at the Hong Kong Velodrome. Opened in 2013, the velodrome hosted the final round of the UCI Track Cycling World Cup (2015-16, 2018-19), as well as the 2017 UCI Track Cycling World Championships, which is the first one in Asia in the 21st Century. It has permanent seating for 2,000 spectators, expandable to 3,000 for events such as the World Cup.

=== Manchester, United Kingdom ===
The sixth round was hosted in Manchester, a big northwestern city of the United Kingdom. This round will be held between 22-24 March. The Manchester Velodrome was completed in 1994 and is the home of British Cycling's National Cycling Centre. The Manchester Velodrome already hosted the 2002 Commonwealth Games, UCI Track Cycling World Championships (1996, 2000, 2008), British National Track Championships and Revolution Cycling series.

=== Brisbane, Australia ===
The final would be held in Brisbane, Eastern city in Queensland during 12-14 April. Anna Meares Velodrome was completed in 2016 and named after Olympic gold medallist Anna Meares. It hosted the track cycling events at the 2018 Commonwealth Games. Offices of Cycling Queensland are incorporated in the velodrome.

== Format ==
The men compete in teams of two across the six days and women’s event across three days for the first three rounds. Sprinters will also compete for 6 days. There are certain differences in the races between 6 Day Series and UCI Track Cycling World Cup and UCI Track Cycling World Championships

The following events will be raced in the series:

- Derny, men
- Team elimination, men and women
- Sprint finals, men and women
- Keirin, men and women
- 200m flying time trial, men and women
- Omnium, women
- The Longest lap, men
- Lap Record, men and women
- Madison, men and women
- 2 Lap madison time trial, men
- 10 km scratch race, women

== Results ==
=== Men ===
(Germany) Berlin | 24-29 January 2019
Rank	Riders	Day 1 Pts	Day 2 Pts	Day 3 Pts	Day 4 Pts	Day 5 Pts	Day 6 Pts
1st place, gold medalist(s)	(Germany) Roger Kluge/Theo Reinhardt	90	158 (-1 lap)	246	289	358 (-1 lap)	470
2nd place, silver medalist(s)	(Denmark) Marc Hester/Jesper Morkov	83	161	237	299	357 (-1 lap)	482 (-1 lap)
3rd place, bronze medalist(s)	(Austria) Andreas Graf/Andreas Muller	53	130	206	273	324 (-1 lap)	414 (-1 lap)
4	(Belgium) (Netherlands) Robbe Ghys/Wim Stroetinga	66	153 (-1 lap)	234	289	372	463 (-2 laps)
5	(Poland) Wojciech Pszczolarski/Daniel Staniszewski	68	125 (-1 lap)	220	290	355 (-1 lap)	437 (-2 laps)
6	(Germany) Henning Bommel/Kersten Thiele	71	137 (-1 lap)	215 (-2 laps)	296 (-2 laps)	340 (-4 laps)	406 (-6 laps)
7	(Belgium) (Netherlands) Jules Hesters/Melvin Van Zijl	66	129 (-1 lap)	171 (-3 laps)	244 (-2 laps)	305 (-4 laps)	331 (-7 laps)
8	(Germany) Moritz Augenstein/Sebastian Schmiedel	70 (-1 lap)	134 (-4 laps)	181 (-6 laps)	237 (-6 laps)	271 (-10 laps)	323 (-13 laps)
9	(Germany) Maximilian Beyer/Achim Burkart	49 (-1 lap)	107 (-4 laps)	142 (-6 laps)	192 (-7 laps)	211 (-10 laps)	269 (-15 laps)
10	(United Kingdom) Chris Latham/Andrew Tennant (Australia) Stephen Hall/Joshua Harrison	40; 44 (-1 lap)	91 (-5 laps); 76 (-6 laps)	150 (-6 laps); 102 (-9 laps)	197 (-7 laps); 142 (-11 laps)	201 (-12 laps)	249 (-15 laps)
11	(Netherlands) Nick Stöpler/Maikel Zijlaard	34 (-1 lap)	70 (-6 laps)	122 (-7 laps)	170 (-8 laps)	212 (-12 laps)	237 (-15 laps)
12	(Denmark) Sebastian Lander/Matias Malmberg	37 (-1 laps)	62 (-7 laps)	95 (-11 laps)	130 (-11 laps)	162 (-17 laps)	196 (-21 laps)
13	(Russia) Denis Nekrasov/Sergey Rostovtsev	28 (-2 laps)	62 (-9 laps)	74 (-14 laps)	113 (-16 laps)	133 (-22 laps)	158 (-26 laps)
14	(Germany) Calvin Dik/Nils Weispfennig	30 (-4 laps)	57 (-12 laps)	130 (-15 laps)	76 (-17 laps)	135 (-23 laps)	147 (-28 laps)
15	(Czech Republic) Daniel Babor/Luděk Lichnovský	4 (-5 laps)	12 (-15 laps)	30 (-19 laps)	51 (-22 laps)	72 (-28 laps)	100 (-34 laps)

Hong Kong | 8-10 March 2019
Rank	Riders	Day 1 Pts	Day 2 Pts	Day 3 Pts
1st place, gold medalist(s)	(Belgium) (Netherlands) Kenny De Ketele/Yoeri Havik	93	197	246
2nd place, silver medalist(s)	(Austria) Andreas Graf/Andreas Muller	42	109	157 (-1 lap)
3rd place, bronze medalist(s)	(United States) Daniel Holloway/Adrian Hegyvary	60 (-1 lap)	120 (-1 lap)	226 (-2 laps)
4	(Denmark) Marc Hester/Jesper Morkov	66 (-1 lap)	141 (-1 lap)	222 (-2 laps)
5	(Switzerland) Tristan Marguet/Nico Selenati	65 (-1 lap)	145 (-1 lap)	189 (-2 laps)
6	(Netherlands) Nick Stöpler/Melvin Van Zijl	61	113	168 (-2 laps)
7	(Hong Kong) Cheung King Lok/Leung Chun Wing	62 (-2 laps)	157 (-2 laps)	226 (-3 laps)
8	(Germany) Henning Bommel/Kersten Thiele	31 (-3 laps)	110 (-3 laps)	167 (-5 laps)

=== Women ===
(Germany) Berlin | January 24-29 January 2019
Rank	Riders	Day 1 Pts	Day 2 Pts	Day 3 Pts
1st place, gold medalist(s)	(Denmark) Trine Schmidt	90	190	290
2nd place, silver medalist(s)	(Denmark) Julie Leth	82	182	264
3rd place, bronze medalist(s)	(Russia) Tamara Dronova	66	144	228
4	(France) Pascale Jeuland	74	150	228
5	(Italy) Elena Cecchini	60	138	206
Hong Kong | 8-10 March 2019
Rank	Riders	Day 1 Pts	Day 2 Pts	Day 3 Pts
1st place, gold medalist(s)	(United Kingdom) Neah Evans	90	178	272
2nd place, silver medalist(s)	(United Kingdom) Emily Nelson	82	170	270
3rd place, bronze medalist(s)	(Republic of Ireland) Shannon McCurley	66	148	232
4	(United Kingdom) Manon Lloyd	74	130	198
5	(Russia) Maria Averina	44	122	188
6	(Australia) Lauren Perry	17	99	175
7	(Hong Kong) Leung Bo Yee	60	130	174
8	(Denmark) Josefine Huitfeldt	40	118	159

=== Sprinters (Men) ===
(Germany) Berlin | 24-29 January 2019
Rank	Riders	Day 1 Pts	Day 2 Pts	Day 3 Pts	Day 4 Pts	Day 5 Pts	Day 6 Pts
1st place, gold medalist(s)	(Germany) Maximilian Levy	50	98	148	198	223	273
2nd place, silver medalist(s)	(Russia) Denis Dmitriev	41	77	113	191	357 (-1 lap)	233
3rd place, bronze medalist(s)	(Russia) Shane Perkins	26	65	102	137	169	211
4	(Russia) Nikita Shurshin	42	66	96	116	143	173
5	(Germany) Anton Höhne	30	70	98	124	140	169
6	(France) Francois Pervis	24	50	82	116	128	148

Hong Kong | 8-10 March 2019
Rank	Riders	Day 1 Pts	Day 2 Pts	Day 3 Pts
1st place, gold medalist(s)	(Czech Republic) Pavel Kelemen	50	102	152
2nd place, silver medalist(s)	(Russia) Shane Perkins	45	90	140
3rd place, bronze medalist(s)	(Malaysia) Azizulhasni Awang	44	74	110
4	(France) Francois Pervis	26	60	86
5	(Chinese Taipei) Kang Shih Feng	28	50	81
6	(Hong Kong) Law Tsz Chun	20	50	70

=== Sprinters (Women) ===
Hong Kong | 8-10 March 2019
Rank	Riders	Day 1 Pts	Day 2 Pts	Day 3 Pts
1st place, gold medalist(s)	(Hong Kong) Lee Wai Sze	55	103	158
2nd place, silver medalist(s)	(Germany) Miriam Welte	50	94	136
3rd place, bronze medalist(s)	(Poland) Urszula Los	28	73	105
4	(Belgium) Nicky Degrendele	34	66	102
5	(Hong Kong) Li Yin Yin	26	48	78
6	(Hong Kong) Lee Sze Wing	20	42	60

== Series Standings ==
At the end of each Six Day event the Series Standings are updated. Riders are aiming to secure enough points throughout the Series to reach the Six Day Final in Brisbane and a chance to be crowned 2018/19 Series Champions.

Legend
Top riders qualify to 2019 Six Day Brisbane Final

=== Men ===
Rank	Riders	Points
1	(Netherlands) Yoeri Havik/Wim Stroetinga	100
2	(Australia) Leigh Howard/Kelland O'Brien	80
3	(Germany) Roger Kluge/Theo Reinhardt	65
4	(United Kingdom) Chris Latham/Andy Tennant	50
5	(Poland) Wojciech Pszczolarski/Daniel Staniszewski	40
6	(Denmark) Marc Hester/Jesper Morkov	30
7	(Belgium) Jules Hesters/Otto Vergaerde	25
8	(Austria) Andreas Graf/Andreas Muller	20
9	(Netherlands) Nick Stöpler/Melvin Van Zijl	16
10	(New Zealand) Shane Archbold/Aaron Gate	12
11	(Germany) Henning Bommel/Kersten Thiele	10
12	(Czech Republic) Daniel Babor/Luděk Lichnovský	8

=== Women ===
Rank	Riders	Points
1	(Australia) Georgia Baker	140
2	(United Kingdom) Emily Nelson	130
3	(United Kingdom) Neah Evans	100
3	(Australia) Annette Edmondson	100
3	(Denmark) Trine Schmidt	100
6	(Australia) Ashlee Ankudinoff	100
7	(Australia) Kristina Clonan	95
8	(Australia) Amy Pauwels	90
9	(Australia) Alex Manly	80
10	(Denmark) Julie Leth	80
