= Six Days of São Paulo =

Sports competition

Race details
- Region: São Paulo, Brazil
- Discipline: Track
- Type: Six-day racing

History
- First edition: 1957
- Editions: 2
- Final edition: 1959
- First winner: (Italy) Severino Rigoni (Argentina) Bruno Sivilotti
- Final winner: (Brazil) Antonio Alba (Brazil) Claudio Rosa

The Six Days of São Paulo was a six-day cycling event held in São Paulo, Brazil. Two editions of the event were held. The first was held in January 1957, and was won by Italian-Argentine team Severino Rigoni and Bruno Sivilotti; the second in March 1959, won by Brazilian duo Antonio Alba and Claudio Rosa.

== Winners ==
Edition	Winners	Second	Third
1957	(Italy) Severino Rigoni (Argentina) Bruno Sivilotti	(Italy) Mario Ghella (Brazil) Giuseppe Sunzeri	(Argentina) Mario García (Brazil) Enio Simões
1959	(Brazil) Antonio Alba (Brazil) Claudio Rosa	(Argentina) Antonio Alexandre (Argentina) Ramón Vázquez	(Argentina) Bruno Sivilotti (Brazil) Giuseppe Sunzeri
