= Six Days of Rio de Janeiro =

Coordinates: 22.5503°S 43.1117°W

Race details
- Date: August
- Region: Rio de Janeiro, Brazil
- Discipline: Track
- Type: Six-day racing

History
- First edition: 1956
- Editions: 1

The Six Days of Rio de Janeiro was a six-day cycling event, held in Rio de Janeiro. The event was only held once, in August 1956, won by Italian-Argentine team Severino Rigoni and Bruno Sivilotti.

== Roll of honour ==
Edition	Winners	Second	Third
1956	(Italy) Severino Rigoni (Argentina) Bruno Sivilotti	(Argentina) Mario García (Argentina) Ernesto Giacche	(Brazil) José Carvalho (Brazil) Claudio Rosa
