= Six-day racing =

Track cycling event that competes over six days

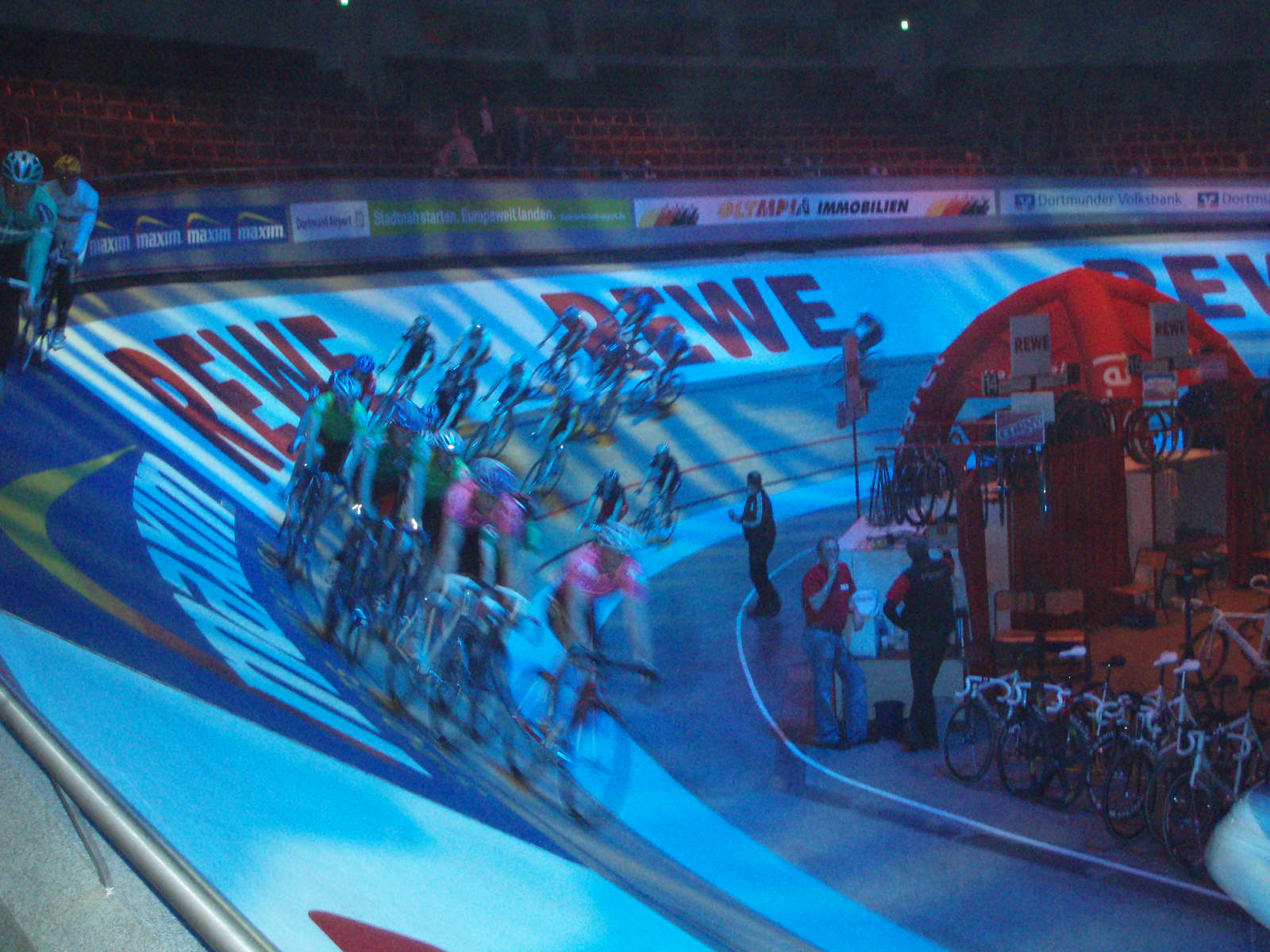
Racing at the 2007 Six Days of Dortmund

Six-day cycling is a track cycling event that takes place over six days. Six-day races started in Britain, spread to many regions of the world, were brought to their modern style in the United States and are now mainly a European event. Initially, individuals competed alone, the winner being the individual who completed the most laps. However, the format was changed to allow teams (usually of two riders each), one rider racing while the other rested. The 24-hours a day regime has also been relaxed, so that most six-day races involve six nights of racing, typically from 6pm to 2am, on indoor tracks (velodromes).

The overall winner is the team which completes most laps. In the event of teams completing the same number of laps, the winner is the team with most points won in intermediate competitions (see points race). As well as the 'chase' to gain laps over competitors, a typical six-day programme will include time trials, motor-paced, intermediate sprint and elimination races. In the main 'chase' or Madison events (named after Madison Square Garden in New York City, where the two-rider format was devised), both riders may be on the track at the same time, taking it in turns to race, hand-slinging each other back into action.

In 2024, the only remaining six-day races that are still annually ridden are those of Rotterdam and Gent. Others, including major historic events such as Berlin, Copenhagen, London, Bremen, Fiorenzuola, Melbourne, and Zürich, have seen their six-day races either truncated to three or four day events, or canceled altogether.

== Origins ==
The first six-day event was an individual time trial at the Agricultural Hall in Islington, London, in 1878, when a professional called David Stanton sought a bet that he could ride 1,000 miles in six successive days, riding 18 hours a day. A Mr Davis put up £100 and the stake was held by the Sporting Life newspaper. Stanton started at 6am on 25 February and won the bet in 73 hours, riding on a high-wheeled machine at an average speed of 13.5 mph.

Six-day cycle races involving more than one rider grew out of the 19th-century enthusiasm for endurance and other novelty competitions. A promoter at the Agricultural Hall held a six-day walking contest in April 1877. It was enough of a success for another to be held the following year. That inspired another organiser, name no longer known, to organise a six-day race in the same hall but for cyclists, also in 1878. He hoped to attract the crowd of 20,000 a day that had turned out for the walkers.

The Islington Gazette reported:

"A bicycle contest was commenced at the Agricultural Hall, on Monday last, for which £150 is offered in prizes for a six days' competition, the money to be allocated thus: £100 for the first man, £25 for the second, £15 for the third, and £10 for the fourth."

The race started at 6am with only four of the 12 entrants on the track. Although it is often said that the first six-day was a non-stop, no-sleeping event that ran without pause for six days, in fact riders joined in when they chose and slept as they wished.

The winner was Bill Cann, of Sheffield, who led from the start and finished after 1,060 miles.

== American six-days ==
In America, the first six-day bicycle race was held in Chicago’s Exposition Building in November 1879, a competition between Englishmen against Americans, won by the English, David Stanton and Bill Cann, who rode a combined distance of 1,665 miles. Many other six-day races were held in America during the 1880s.

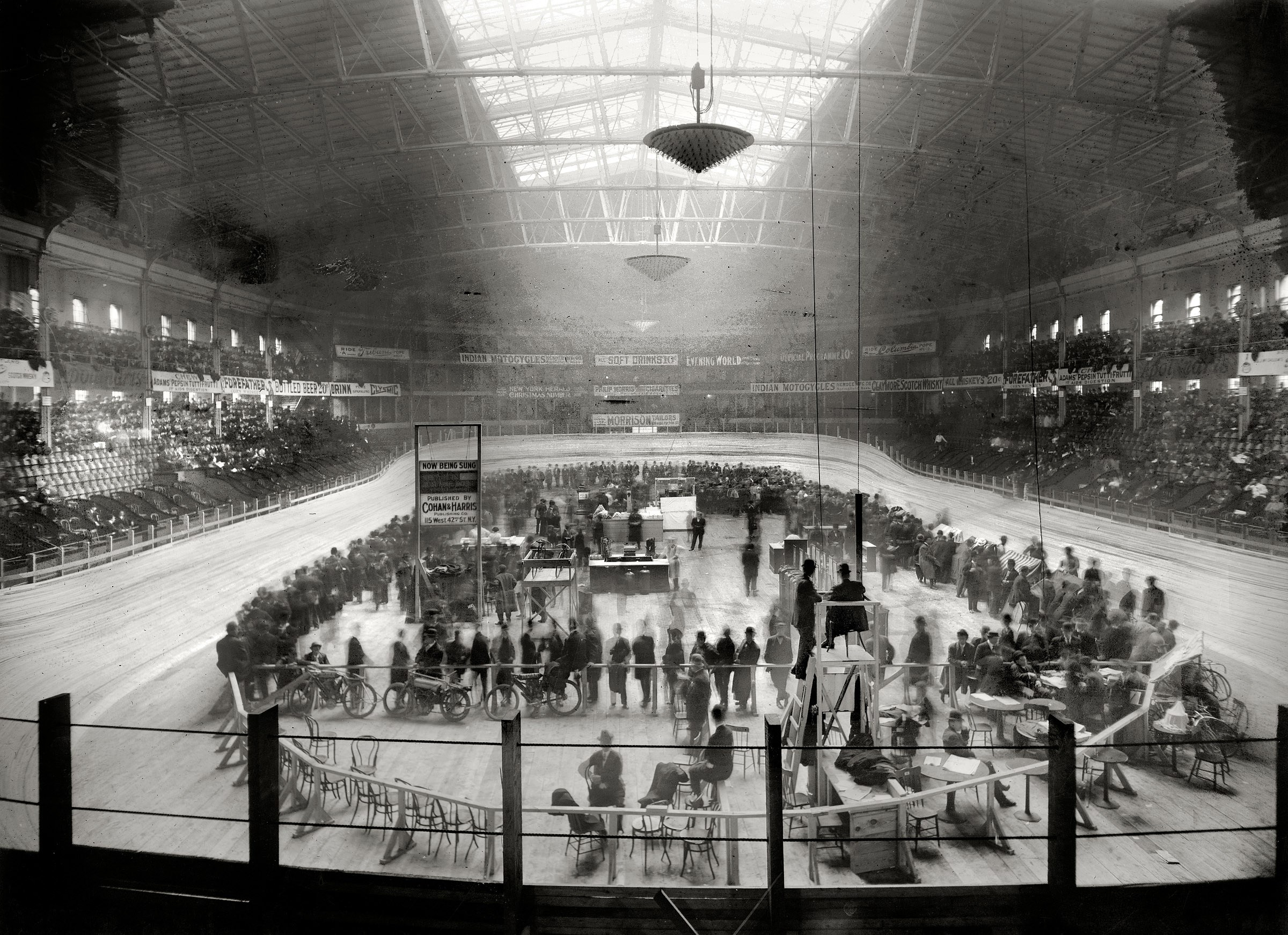
A six-day race at Madison Square Garden II in December 1908

However, the event did not become popular until 1891, when the first Six Days of New York were held in New York's Madison Square Garden. Initially, these races were contests of raw endurance, with a single rider completing as many laps as possible. At first, races were less than 24 hours a day. Riders slept at night and were free to join in the morning when they chose. Faster riders would start later than the slower ones, who would sacrifice sleep to make up for lack of pace. Quickly, riders began competing 24 hours a day, limited only by their ability to stay awake. Many employed seconds, as in boxing, to keep them going. The seconds, known by their French name, soigneurs, were said to have used doping to keep their riders circling the track. Riders became desperately tired. According to a contemporary newspaper clipping retained by Major Taylor:

The riders are becoming peevish and fretful. The wear and tear upon their nerves and their muscles, and the loss of sleep make them so. If their desires are not met with on the moment, they break forth with a stream of abuse. Nothing pleases them. These outbreaks do not trouble the trainers with experience, for they understand the condition the men are in.

The condition included delusions and hallucinations. Riders wobbled and fell. But they were often well paid, especially since more people came to watch as their condition worsened. Promoters in New York paid Teddy Hale US$5,000 when he won in 1896 and he won "like a ghost, his face as white as a corpse, his eyes no longer visible because they'd retreated into his skull", according to one report. The New York Times said in 1897:

It is a fine thing that a man astride two wheels can, in a six-day race, distance a hound, horse, or a locomotive. It confirms the assumption, no longer much contested, that the human animal is superior to the other animals. But this undisputed thing is being said in too solemn and painful way at Madison Square Garden. An athletic contest in which participants 'go queer' in their heads, and strain their powers until their faces become hideous with the tortures that rack them, is not sport. It is brutality. Days and weeks of recuperation will be needed to put the Garden racers in condition, and it is likely that some of them will never recover from the strain.

=== New York's twelve-hour law ===
By the late 1890s the solo six-day races at Madison Square Garden had drawn criticism for the toll they took on riders, who competed around the clock with minimal sleep. In 1899 the New York State Legislature made it unlawful for any contestant in a bicycle race or other contest of speed or endurance to compete for more than twelve hours in any twenty-four-hour period; the measure was approved by the Governor on April 14, 1899. The bill had been introduced by Assemblyman Cornelius F. Collins.

=== Introduction of the two-man team events ===
Six-day racing remained popular in the US. The intention was to allow riders to rest half the day, but promoters realised that teams of two, with only one rider on the track at a time, would give each the 12 hours' rest the law intended while still allowing the race to go around the clock. Races lasted six days rather than a week to avoid racing on Sunday. Speeds rose, distances grew, crowds increased, money poured in. Where Charlie Miller rode 2,088 miles alone, Alf Goullet and a decent partner could ride 2,790. The first such race was at Madison Square Garden and two-man tag racing has become known in English as a madison and to the French as l'américaine.

In the main 'chase' or madison sessions, both riders may be on the track at the same time, taking it in turns to race, hand-slinging each other back into action. The non-racing rider will circle the track slowly at the top of the banking until 'slung' back into the race. The hand-sling is an advanced skill that, in some countries, is only allowed for professional riders. The racing rider may also propel a teammate into the race by pushing the seat of the rider's racing shorts.

The historian Raymond Dickow said of riders in the post-1898 races:

The highest paid was Alfred Goullet of Australia. He earned $1,000 a day in addition to cash prizes won during sprints. Top riders like Bobby Walthour, US; Franco Giorgetti, Italy; Gérard Debaets, Belgium; and Alfred Letourneur, France, were making from $500 to $750 a day. Amateurs who had just turned pro, and still had to prove their worth, were paid the beginners' rate of $100 a day.

Sixes attracted enthusiasts and celebrities. Knute Rockne, George Raft, Barbara Stanwyck, and Otto Kruger were fans. Kruger used to invite riders home. Bing Crosby – whose presence at a track guaranteed he would be met by song-publishers' touts offering him music – was said to pay the hospital bills of riders who fell. The actress Peggy Joyce – whose wealth was such that Cole Porter wrote a lyric that said My string of Rolls-Royces, is longer than Peggy Joyce's – gave regular $200 bonus prizes, or primes. She was so delighted when a band in the track centre played Pretty Peggy with eyes of Blue that she put up $1,000.

Racing was at its hardest when the stands were full. Riders took it easy when they were empty and circled the track reading newspapers, talking, even writing letters as they pedalled with one foot, the other steering the handlebars. But sometimes a team would attack when things were quiet. Jimmy Walthour remembered one such night in 1933:

[At 4am], Tino Reboli and his partner were 12 laps behind the leaders. In desperation, they decided that no one would sleep that night. They knew that they had to close the gap up to stay in the race. One shift of riders had gone to the dormitory in another part of the building. Reboli and his partner, however, remained on the track. The team made its bid and gained three laps before trainers of the other teams could shake the sleeping cyclists out of bed. The jam turned into one of the wildest ever experienced in the history of the Garden. It necessitated turning on the huge lights over the track, costing the Garden thousands of dollars in lighting.

The only spectators were a handful of puzzled floor sweepers, garbage collectors, and sleepy reporters. At first the riders were mad at Reboli and his partner for starting the ruckus. They pedalled furiously to grind them down. But in frustration and irritation over loss of sleep, the riders became angry at one another ... As for Reboli and his partner, the session of jamming set them 12 laps behind again. The referee withdrew them from the race.

Six-day racing was popular in the United States until the Second World War. Then the rise of the automobile and the Great Depression brought a decline. Dickow said: "Attempts were made to revive the sport by several different promoters but none of them managed to restore bike racing to its former popularity." A further problem was that the more promoters brought in European opposition to spice up races for a potential crowd, the more the Europeans dominated and lessened the appeal for spectators. Jerry Rodman, one of the American riders, said: "In previous years, six-day bicycle racing faded only as a result of war or depression. Under the promotion of Harry Mendel, however, the sport, for the first time began to decline due to lack of spectator interest."

Jimmy Walthour said: "Six-day races began to fade in 1938. It was about that time when the skater Sonja Henie was given preference to appearance dates in Madison Square Garden. December was a traditional Garden date for the races but her show replaced the races for that month."

Annual sixes in Boston were discontinued in 1933, Detroit in 1936, and Chicago in 1948. The Six Days of New York hung on until 1950. There were some revivals but none succeeded. Sporting Cyclist published a picture of the last night of the Chicago six in 1957 being ridden with seven people in the quarter of the stands that the camera caught.

== European popularity ==
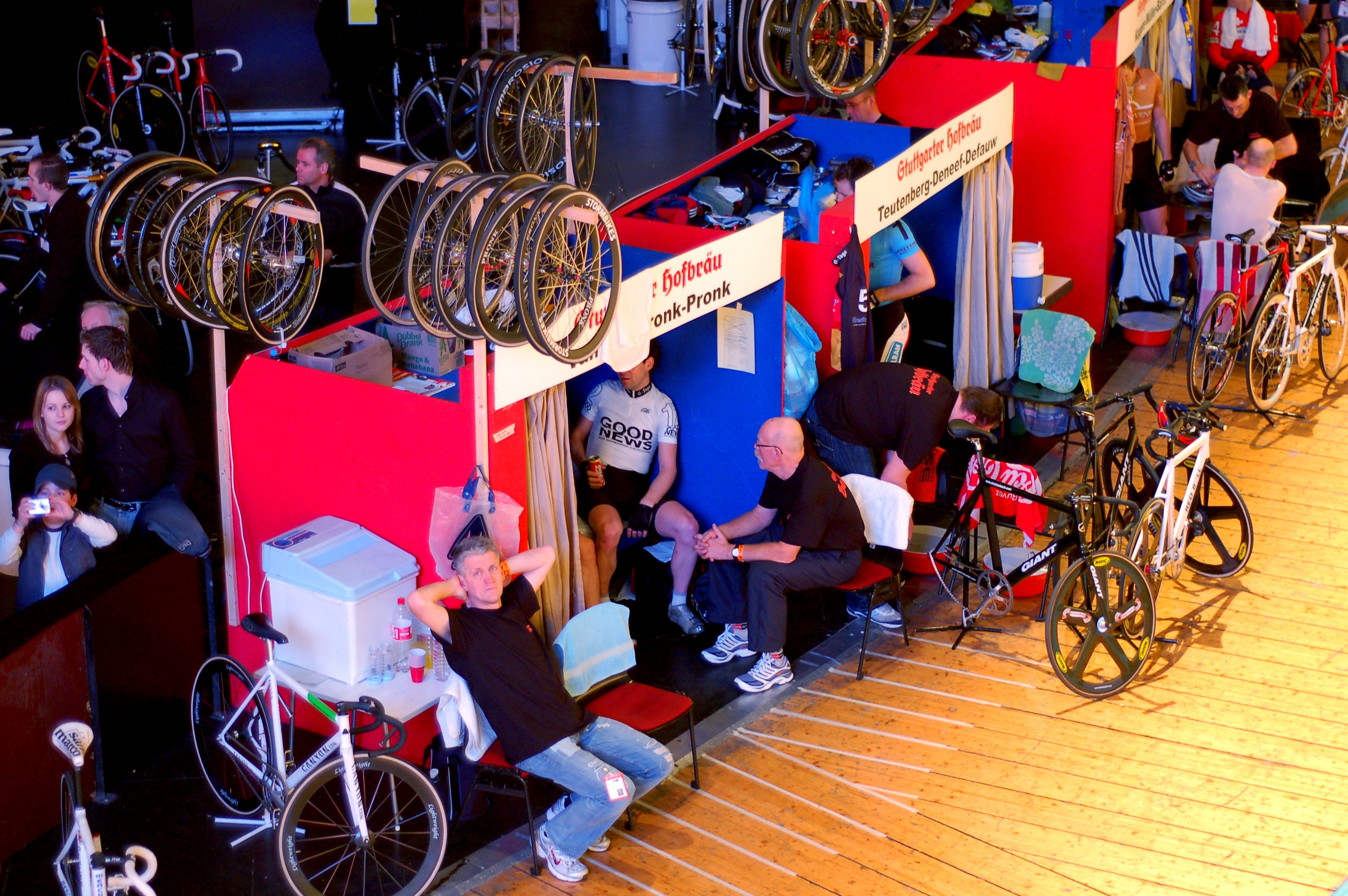
Riders rest in small cabins beside the track when the race is in progress

The success of madisons in America led to their introduction in Europe. The first was at Toulouse in 1906, although it was abandoned after three days because of lack of interest. Berlin tried, three years later, with success. Five races were held in Germany in 1911–12. Brussels followed in 1912 and Paris in 1913.

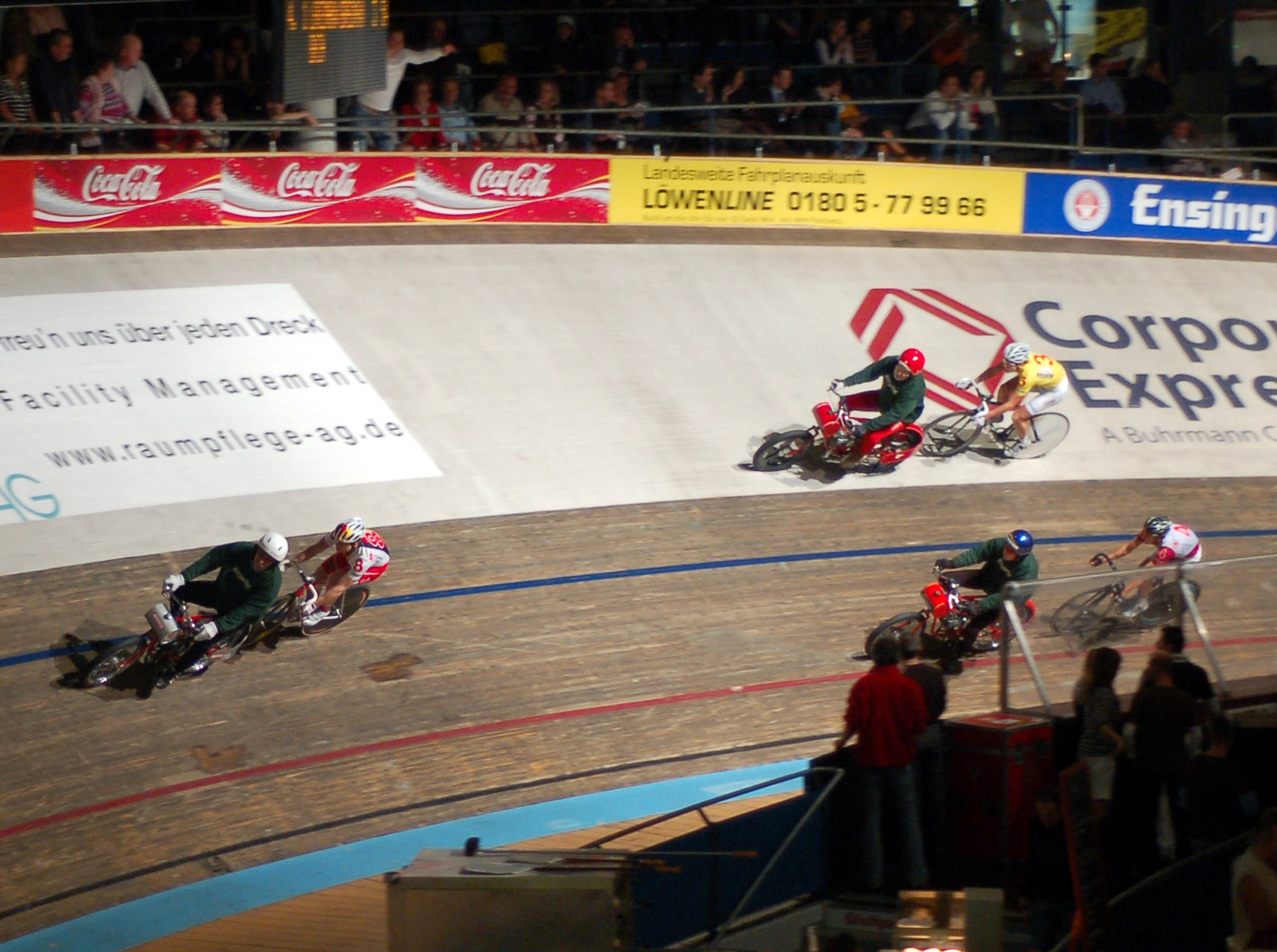
Riders compete not only in madisons but in subsidiary competitions behind pacers

The six-day race continued to do well in Europe. Its heart was in Germany – although races were curtailed in Germany by the Nazis, a six-day event was held in 1938 and was attended by a number of international representatives. These events were strong too, in Belgium and France. In 1923 the journalist Egon Erwin Kisch attended the tenth staging of the Berlin Six Day Race and wrote a celebrated piece "Elliptische Tretmuehle" (Elliptical Treadmill). London saw one race at Olympia in July 1923, and then a series of races at Wembley starting in 1936. The local man, Frank Southall, crashed and left for hospital. So did another British hope, Syd Cozens. Only nine of the 15 teams lasted the race. The series continued, with more success, until the start of the second world war in 1939.

Racing began hesitantly after 1945. The first in Germany for 17 years were in 1950; two further races were held at Wembley in 1951 and 1952. Eventually, though, European races began to decline. Races continued through the night, as they had in the US, but the costs of keeping open stadiums for partygoers who'd missed the bus and a small number of dedicated fans was too great. London dropped night racing when it revived six-day racing in 1967 at Earls Court and the following year at Wembley a new organiser, former rider Ron Webb, scheduled just the afternoon and evening, with a break between sessions. Other organisers were not impressed and insisted Webb call his race a "six" and not a "six-day". One by one, however, they followed Webb's pattern and there are now no old-style 24-hour races left. The last was Madrid. There the riders trundled round all night or, if they could get away with it, slipped off for bed. Tom Simpson remembered:

Our mechanic and general runner was David Nice, an Englishman from Colchester, who was not unlike me in a way, for his nose appeared to be, profile view anyway, very similar to mine (poor lad!) and I hit on the splendid idea of putting him out on the track in my place during the neutralised period. Tracksuited, a scarf over the lower part of his face and a Russian hat that I had bought completed the disguise. He was me to anyone giving a cursory glance at the figures plodding round the track. The get-up was quite in order for it became very cold there at night as they used to turn off all the heating. Everything went well for the first night of the wheeze and I congratulated myself on the plan. It could not go on for ever, though, worse luck, for on the very next night the game was up. Dave was trundling round wrapped up to the eyebrows as before when, horrors upon horrors, the track manager, who often rode a bike round himself during the quiet time, started to talk to him.

He thought it was me at first and chatted away quite happily to Dave, whose French was near enough non-existent. Well, it was not long before he sensed something was wrong and whipped the scarf off the poor lad's face. He stormed over to my cabin and dragged me out, half asleep, on to the track. That was that! He and the other officials kept their eyes on us after that and we had little chance of getting away with any more larks like that.

The London Six at Wembley continued annually until 1980.

== Reinventing six day cycling ==
In 1986, German cycling manager Winfried Holtmann revived six-day races in Stuttgart, Münster and Leipzig. As part of the promotion for the races, Holtmann and German game designer Walter Toncar designed the board game 6-Tage Rennen (6-Day Race). However, the revival did not catch on, and was abandoned after one season.

Madison Sports Group, a promoter of cycling events founded in 2013, decided in 2015 to reinvigorate the competition through the introduction of new six-day cycling events in six major cities across the globe, which together form the Six Day Series. The series starts in London travelling across the world, where it touches down in Berlin, Copenhagen, Melbourne and Manchester, before concluding in Brisbane. Although the Six Day Series is their flagship concept, MSG had previously promoted the Rotterdam, Amsterdam and Mallorca Six Day events and were unveiling Hong Kong as the first host in Asia in March 2019.

In 2015, not long after the London 2012 Olympic Games, Madison Sports Group brought Six day Cycling back to London, the event being held at the Lee Valley Velodrome, which had been built as part of the Olympic legacy. Sir Bradley Wiggins chose the 2016 London event as his last UK track appearance, and riders including the Australian Olympic gold medallists Cameron Meyer and Callum Scotson have also raced.

The women's event has also grown with the opportunity to compete in the Madison, an added attraction for some of the world's best exponents of track racing. Two-time world champion Kirsten Wild had attended in previous years, while in Six Day Manchester 2019 Britain's joint most-decorated female Olympic track cyclist at the time, Laura Kenny, competed, joined by Six Day London 2017 and Olympic team Pursuit champion Katie Archibald, and fellow British Cycling teammate Elinor Barker, an Olympic, two-time world and four-time European champion.

== Most six-day victories ==
Names in bold are riders still racing.

Nr.	Name	Country	Races won	Races ridden	Win average
1	Patrick Sercu	(Belgium)	88	223	0,3946
2	Danny Clark	(Australia)	74	235	0,3149
3	René Pijnen	(Netherlands)	72	233	0,3090
4	Peter Post	(Netherlands)	65	155	0,4194
5	Bruno Risi	(Switzerland)	61	178	0,3427
6	Rik Van Steenbergen	(Belgium)	40	134	0,2985
7	William Peden	(Canada)	38	127	0,2992
	Etienne De Wilde	(Belgium)	38	197	0,1929
9	Kurt Betschart	(Switzerland)	37	142	0,2606
	Klaus Bugdahl	(Germany)	37	229	0,1616
11	Gustav Kilian	(Germany)	34	90	0,3778
	Albert Fritz	(Germany)	34	198	0,1717
13	Fritz Pfenninger	(Switzerland)	33	181	0,1823
14	Heinz Vopel	(Germany)	32	74	0,4324
	Piet van Kempen	(Netherlands)	32	110	0,2909
	Franco Marvulli	(Switzerland)	32	112	0,3333
17	Dietrich Thurau	(Germany)	29	97	0,2990
18	Silvio Martinello	(Italy)	28	97	0,2887
19	Dieter Kemper	(Germany)	26	165	0,1576
20	Emile Severeyns	(Belgium)	25	151	0,1656
21	Andreas Kappes	(Germany)	24	116	0,2069
	Marco Villa	(Italy)	24	141	0,1702
23	**Iljo Keisse**	(Belgium)	23	72	0,3194
	Rudi Altig	(Germany)	23	79	0,2911
	Ferdinando Terruzzi	(Italy)	23	121	0,1901
	Tony Doyle	(United Kingdom)	23	139	0,1655
	Sigi Renz	(Germany)	23	159	0,1447
28	Alfred Letourneur	(France)	21	84	0,2500
	Robert Bartko	(Germany)	21	76	0,2800
	Reggie McNamara	(Australia)	21	119	0,1764
	Palle Lykke	(Denmark)	21	122	0,1721
	Urs Freuler	(Switzerland)	21	139	0,1511
33	Gert Frank	(Denmark)	20	143	0,1399
34	Gerrit Schulte	(Netherlands)	19	73	0,2603
35	Eddy Merckx	(Belgium)	17	35	0,4857
	Jan Pijnenburg	(Netherlands)	17	50	0,3400
	Gerard Debaets	(Belgium)	17	90	0,1889
	Donald Allan	(Australia)	17	107	0,1589
	Matthew Gilmore	(Belgium)	17	107	0,1589
40	Cecil Yates	(United States)	16	57	0,2807
	Sid Patterson	(Australia)	16	57	0,2807
	Jean Roth	(Switzerland)	16	85	0,1882
	Reg Arnold	(Australia)	16	103	0,1553
	Leo Duyndam	(Netherlands)	16	143	0,1119
	Danny Stam	(Netherlands)	16	111	0,1744
	Wilfried Peffgen	(Germany)	16	188	0,0851
47	Francesco Moser	(Italy)	15	35	0,4285
	Alfred Goullet	(Australia)	15	29	0,5172
	Scott McGrory	(Australia)	15	69	0,2029
	Roman Hermann	(Liechtenstein)	15	182	0,0824
	Adriano Baffi	(Italy)	15	99	0,1515
52	Kay Werner Nielsen	(Denmark)	14	56	0,2500
53	Armin von Büren	(Switzerland)	13	58	0,2241
	Jens Veggerby	(Denmark)	13	89	0,1461
	Erik Zabel	(Germany)	13	28	0,4643
56	Rik Van Looy	(Belgium)	12	43	0,2791
	Graeme Gilmore	(Australia)	12	100	0,1200
58	Gregor Braun	(Germany)	11	44	0,2500
	Günther Haritz	(Germany)	11	83	0,1325
	Robert Slippens	(Netherlands)	11	70	0,1571
61	Rolf Aldag	(Germany)	10	29	0,3448
	Horst Oldenburg	(Germany)	10	100	0,1000
	Lucien Gillen	(Luxembourg)	10	116	0,0862
	Wolfgang Schulze	(Germany)	10	135	0,0741

== Six-days ==
Six at	Number of editions	First ridden	Last ridden	Most wins by
Adelaide (SA)	6	1960	1967	Sid Patterson, Nino Solari (2)
Amsterdam; Six Days of Amsterdam	22	1932	2014	Danny Stam (4)
Antwerp; Six Days of Antwerp	52	1934	1994	Peter Post (11)
Apeldoorn	1	2009	2009	Léon van Bon, Pim Ligthart and Robert Bartko (1)
Århus; Six Days of Aarhus	9	1954	1961	Kay Werner Nielsen (4)
Atlantic City; Six Days of Atlantic City	2	1909	1932	No repeat winners
Bassano del Grappa; Six Days of Bassano del Grappa	8	1986	1998	Danny Clark (3)
Bendigo (Vic)	1	1960	1960	Bill Lawrie, Vic Brown (1)
Berlin; Six Days of Berlin	109	1909	2026	Klaus Bugdahl (9)
Boston; Six Days of Boston	13	1901	1933	Alfred Goullet, Alfred Hill, Norman Hill (2)
Bremen; Six Days of Bremen	51	1910	2026	René Pijnen (7)
Breslau	8	1921	1931	Piet van Kempen, Willy Rieger (3)
Brisbane (Qld)	1	1932	1932	Richard Lamb, Jack Standen (1)
Brussels; Six Days of Brussels	46	1912	1971	Rik Van Steenbergen (8)
Buenos Aires; Six Days of Buenos Aires	27	1936	2000	Jorge Batiz (5)
Buffalo; Six Days of Buffalo	16	1910	1948	Gustav Kilian (4)
Charleroi; Six Days of Charleroi	3	1967	1969	Patrick Sercu (2)
Chicago; Six Days of Chicago	50	1915	1957	Gustav Kilian (6)
Cologne; Six Days of Cologne	46	1928	1997	Albert Fritz (6)
Copenhagen; Six Days of Copenhagen	52	1933	2026	Danny Clark (8)
Cremona	1	2009	2009	Walter Pérez, Sebastian Donadio (1)
Dortmund; Six Days of Dortmund	67	1926	2008	Patrick Sercu, Rolf Aldag (8)
Essen; Six Days of Essen	8	1960	1967	Peter Post , Fritz Pfenninger (3)
Fiorenzuola d'Arda; Six Days of Fiorenzuola	25	1998	2022	Franco Marvulli (5)
Frankfurt; Six Days of Frankfurt	37	1911	1983	Dietrich Thurau, Patrick Sercu (5)
Ghent; Six Days of Ghent	80	1922	2025	Patrick Sercu (11)
Grenoble; Six Days of Grenoble	44	1971	2014	Franco Marvulli (6)
Groningen; Six Days of Groningen	4	1970	1979	Klaus Bugdahl, Dieter Kemper (2)
Hanover; Six Days of Hanover	10	1913	1981	Emile Carrara (2)
Hasselt; Six Days of Hasselt	4	2006	2009	Bruno Risi (3)
Herning; Six Days of Herning	14	1974	1998	Gert Frank (5)
Launceston (Tas)	21	1961	1987	Keith Oliver (4)
London; Six Day London	24	1923	2019	Patrick Sercu (8)
Maastricht; Six Days of Maastricht	13	1976	2006	René Pijnen (6)
Madrid; Six Days of Madrid	14	1960	1986	Rik Van Steenbergen (3)
Maryborough (Qld)	3	1961	1967	Bruce Clark, Robert Ryan, Jim Luttrel, Ronald Murray, Sid Patterson, Barry Waddell (1)
Melbourne (Vic)	24	1912	2017	Leandro Faggin, Sid Patterson (3)
Milan; Six Days of Milan	29	1927	2008	Francesco Moser (6)
Montréal; Six Days of Montreal	37	1929	1980	William Peden (7)
Munich; Six Days of Munich	46	1933	2009	Bruno Risi (9)
Münster; Six Days of Münster	34	1950	1988	Jean Roth (5)
New York City; Six Days of New York	70	1899	1961	Alfred Goullet, Franco Giorgetti (8)
Newark; Six Days of Newark	4	1910	1915	No repeat winners
Newcastle (NSW)	3	1961	1970	Sid Patterson (2)
Nouméa	18	1977	2003	Robert Sasson, Jean-Michel Tessier (4)
Paris; Six Days of Paris	42	1913	1989	Piet van Kempen, Schulte, Achiel Bruneel, Albert Billiet, Jean Aerts, Georges Sérès (3)
Perth (WA)	5	1961	1989	Peter Panton, Klaus Stiefler, Ronald Murray, Enzo Sacchi, Ian Campbell, Barry Waddell, Sid Patterson, John Young, Kim Eriksen, Michael Marcussen (1)
Pordenone'; Tre sere di Pordenone	23	2003	2025	Peter Panton, Klaus Stiefler, Ronald Murray, Enzo Sacchi, Ian Campbell, Barry Waddell, Sid Patterson, John Young, Kim Eriksen, Michael Marcussen (1)
Pordenone'; Tre sere di Pordenone	10	1999	2025	Peter Panton, Klaus Stiefler, Ronald Murray, Enzo Sacchi, Ian Campbell, Barry Waddell, Sid Patterson, John Young, Kim Eriksen, Michael Marcussen (1)
Pordenone'; Tre sere di Pordenone	10	1999	2025	Peter Panton, Klaus Stiefler, Ronald Murray, Enzo Sacchi, Ian Campbell, Barry Waddell, Sid Patterson, John Young, Kim Eriksen, Michael Marcussen (1)
Quebec; Six Days of Quebec	3	1964	1966	Emile Severeyns (2)
Rio de Janeiro; Six Days of Rio de Janeiro	1	1956	1956	Severino Rigoni, Bruno Sivilotti (1)
Rotterdam; Six Days of Rotterdam	38	1936	2025	René Pijnen (10)
Saint-Étienne; Six Days of Saint-Étienne	12	1928	1953	Piet van Kempen (3)
Stuttgart; Six Days of Stuttgart	31	1928	2008	Andreas Kappes (6)
São Paulo; Six Days of São Paulo	2	1957	1959	Severino Rigoni, Bruno Sivilotti, Antonio Alba, Claudio Rosa (1)
Sydney (NSW)	17	1912	1974	Ken Ross (3)
Tilburg	2	2009	2011	Tristan Marquet, Franco Marvulli, Nick Stöpler, Yoeri Havik (1)
Toronto; Six Days of Toronto	11	1912	1965	William Peden (4)
Townsville (Qld)	1	1962	1962	Barry Lowe, Sid Patterson (1)
Turin; Six Days of Turin	7	2001	2008	Marco Villa (4)
Whyalla (SA)	3	1966	1968	Sid Patterson, Robert Ryan, Joe Ciavola, Barry Waddell, Keith Oliver, Charly Walsh (1)
Zuidlaren	2	2007	2008	Bruno Risi, Franco Marvulli, Danny Stam, Robert Slippens (1)
Zürich; Six Days of Zürich	58	1954	2013	Bruno Risi (11)

== Six-day races ==
- 2006–07 Six Days Track Cycling Events
- 2007–08 Six Days Track Cycling Events
