= Cycling at the 2006 Commonwealth Games – Men's team sprint =

The men's team sprint at the 2006 Commonwealth Games took place on March 19, 2006, at the Melbourne Multi Purpose Venue.

== Results ==
=== Qualification ===
Rank	Country	Cyclists	Result
1	Scotland	Ross Edgar; Chris Hoy; Craig MacLean	44.265
2	England	Matthew Crampton; Jason Queally; Jamie Staff	44.564
3	Australia	Ryan Bayley; Shane Kelly; Shane Perkins	44.597
4	New Zealand	Justin Grace; Nathan Seddon; Adam Stewart	46.200
5	Canada	Cameron MacKinnon; Yannik Morin; Travis Smith	46.246
6	Malaysia	Junaidi Mohamad Nasir; Josiah Ng; Mohd Rizal Tisin	46.578
7	Barbados	John Cumberbatch; Jason Forde; Jason Perryman	53.059

=== Finals ===
==== Bronze medal ====
Rank	Country	Cyclists	Result
3rd place, bronze medalist(s)	Australia	Ryan Bayley; Shane Kelly; Shane Perkins	44.719
4	New Zealand	Justin Grace; Nathan Seddon; Adam Stewart	46.366

==== Gold medal ====
Rank	Country	Cyclists	Result
1st place, gold medalist(s)	Scotland	Ross Edgar; Chris Hoy; Craig MacLean	44.282
2nd place, silver medalist(s)	England	Matthew Crampton; Jason Queally; Jamie Staff	44.309
