= Six Days of Atlantic City =

Race details
- Date: July
- Region: Atlantic City, United States
- Discipline: Track
- Type: Six-day racing

History
- First edition: 1909
- Editions: 2
- Final edition: 1932
- First winner: (Australia) Paddy Hehir (United States) Eddy Root
- Final winner: (Canada) William Peden (Italy) Franco Giorgetti

The Six Days of Atlantic City was a six-day cycling event, held in Atlantic City, New Jersey. Two editions of the event were held; the first in 1909 and the second in 1932, won by track stars William Peden and Franco Giorgetti.

== Roll of honor ==
Edition	Winners	Second	Third
1909	(Australia) Paddy Hehir (United States) Eddy Root		
1932	(Canada) William Peden (Italy) Franco Giorgetti	(United States) Reggie McNamara (United States) Xavier Van Slembroeck (Note: Van Slembroeck was born in Belgium in 1912, but became a naturalized American citizen in 1930.)	(United States) Louis Cohen (United States) Alfred Crossley

== Full results ==
=== 1932 ===
1. William "Torchy" Peden (Can) - Franco Giorgeti (Ita) 1208 points
2. Reginald McNamara (Aus) - Xavier Van Slembroeck (Usa) 592 à 2 tours
3. Alfred Crossley (Usa) - Louis Cohen (Usa) 537
4. Laurent Gadou (Can) - Harry Horan (Usa) 757 à 3 tours
5. Willy Grimm (Usa) - Henri Lepage (Can) 653
6. Robert Walthour junior (Usa) - Norman Hill (Usa) 540
7. Dave Lands (Usa) - Anthony Beckman (Usa) 550 à 5 tours
