= Six Days of Berlin =

Cycling race

- Six Days of Berlin logo during 1998–2016 season

Race details
- Region: Berlin, Germany
- Discipline: Track
- Competition: Six Day Series (2017–)
- Type: Six-day racing
- Web site: www.sechstagerennen-berlin.de

History
- First edition: 1909
- Editions: 112 (as of 2025)
- Most wins: Klaus Bugdahl (GER) (9)
- Most recent: Roger Kluge (GER); Theo Reinhardt (GER)

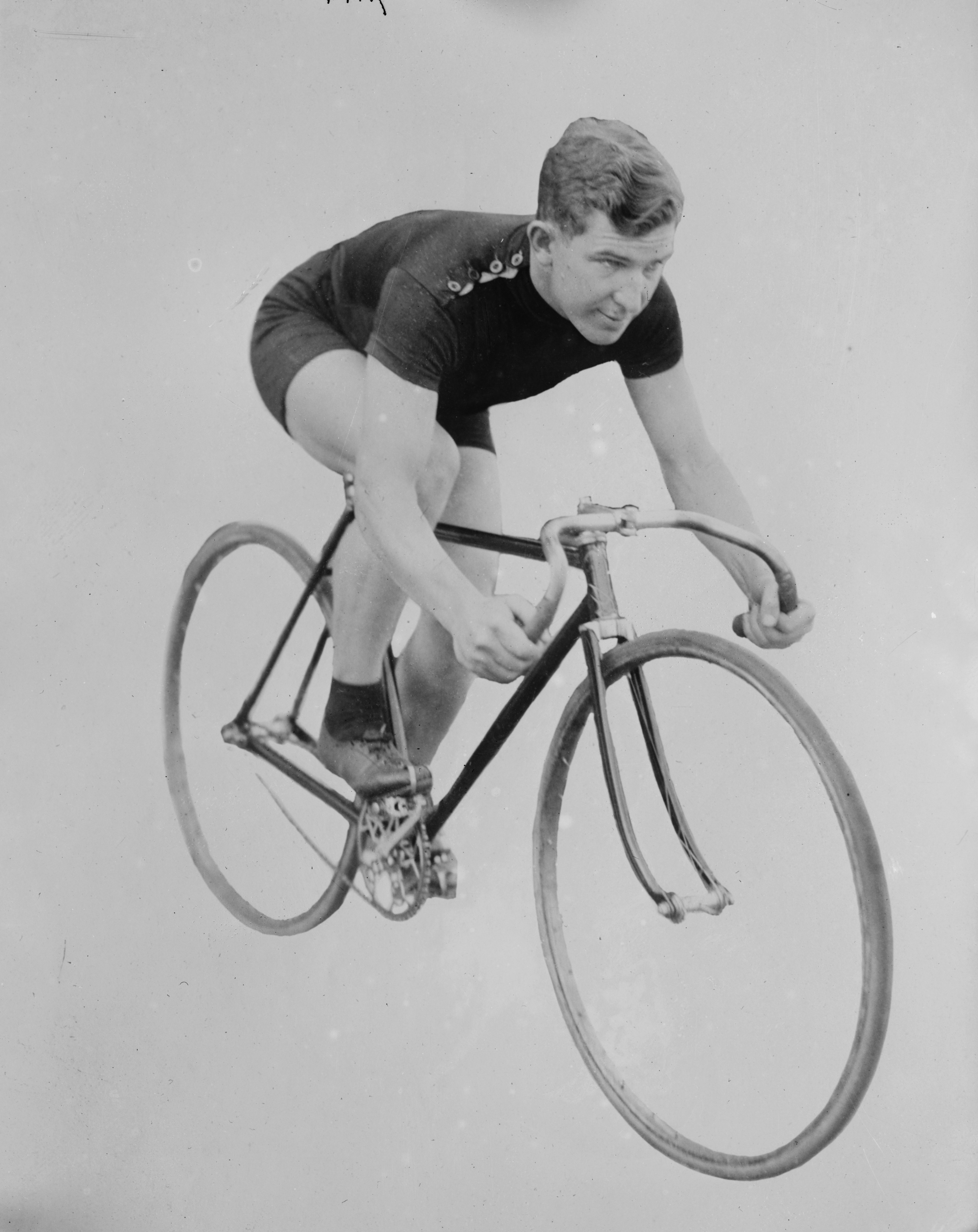
1910 Winner: Jackie Clark

The Six Days of Berlin is a two-day, formerly six-day track cycling race held annually in Berlin, Germany.

The event was first held in 1909. In its first edition, 15 teams of two cyclists each competed in the exhibition hall at Berlin Zoo for glory and, not least, 5000 Goldmarks. Klaus Bugdahl holds the record of victories with nine.

The time when the 6 day race is held is sometimes just in the middle of the football season, the winter is severe, and football league in Germany had rather long winter break. In the past Bundesliga was suspended from mid December to mid February. Therefore, 6-day races were considered major entertainment events at that time (handball was to some extent).

In particular, the Berlin 6-day race, which has reached the 100th race at the 2011 competition, still has a large audience, and in the heyday it was held twice a season. Due to the race format declines in popularity and 2008 financial crisis, Six Days of Dortmund, Stuttgart and Munich folded successively. Another surviving 6 day cycling in Germany is Six Days of Bremen.

Starting from 2017, 6 Days of Berlin was incorporated into the Six Day Series organized by Madison Sports Group in attempting to rejuvenate the race format.

The event was cancelled in 2021 and 2022 due to the COVID-19 pandemic. In 2023, it was shortened to a 3-day race because of a decrease in budget, and was further shortened to 2 days in 2024. The name remains as Six Days of Berlin.

== Winners ==
Year	Winners	Second	Third
1909	James Henri Moran (USA); Floyd MacFarland (USA)	John Stol (NED); Marcel Berthet (FRA)	Georges Passerieu (FRA); Maurice Brocco (FRA)
1910	Walter Rütt (GER); Jackie Clark (AUS)	John Stol (NED); Robert Walthour (USA)	Marcel Berthet (FRA); Maurice Brocco (FRA)
1911	John Stol (NED); Walter Rütt (GER)	James Henri Moran (USA); Floyd McFarland (USA)	Guus Schilling (NED); Maurice Brocco (FRA)
1912 (I)	John Stol (NED); Walter Rütt (GER)	James Henri Moran (USA); Joe Fogler (USA)	Alfred Hill (USA); Eddy Root (USA)
1912 (II)	John Stol (NED); Walter Rütt (GER)	Willie Lorenz (GER); Karl Saldow (GER)	James H. Moran (USA); Eddy Root (USA)
1913	Alfred Hill (USA); Jackie Clark (AUS)	Jules Miquel (FRA); John Stol (NED)	Willie Lorenz (GER); Karl Saldow (GER)
1914	Willie Lorenz (GER); Karl Saldow (GER)	Jules Miquel (FRA); John Stol (NED)	Walter Rütt (GER); Albert Stellbrink (GER)
1915– 1918	Not raced		
1919	Willi Techmer (GER); Karl Saldow (GER)	Walter Sawall (GER); Willy Lorenz (GER)	Emil Lewanow (GER); Otto Pawke (GER)
1920– 1921	Not raced		
1922	Willi Techmer (GER); Karl Saldow (GER)	Erich Aberger (GER); Willy Lorenz (GER)	Klaas Van Nek (NED); Richard Huschke (GER)
1923	Fritz Bauer (GER); Oskar Tietz (GER)	Adolf Huschke (GER); Richard Huschke (GER)	Max Hahn (GER); Franz Krupkat (GER)
1924 (I)	Willie Lorenz (GER); Karl Saldow (GER)	Fritz Bauer (GER); Franz Krupkat (GER)	Arthur Stellbrink (GER); Willi Techmer (GER)
1924 (II)	Richard Huschke (GER); Franz Krupkat (GER)	Giuseppe Oliveri (ITA); Alessandro Tonani (ITA)	Emil Lewanow (GER); Walter Rütt (GER)
1925 (I)	Walter Rütt (GER); Emile Aerts (BEL)	Max Hahn (GER); Oskar Tietz (GER)	Alfred Grenda (AUS); Alex McBeath (AUS)
1925 (II)	Alois Persijn (BEL); Jules Verschelden (BEL)	Max Hahn (GER); Oskar Tietz (GER)	César Debaets (BEL); Emile Thollembeek (BEL)
1926 (I)	Harry Horan (USA); Reginald McNamara (AUS)	Franco Giorgetti (ITA); Willy Rieger (GER)	Max Hahn (GER); Oskar Tietz (GER)
1926 (II)	Lucien Louet (FRA); Pierre Sergent (FRA)	Anthony Beckman (USA); Ray Eaton (USA)	Erich Junge (GER); Willy Gottfried (GER)
1926 (III)	Georges Wambst (FRA); Charles Lacquehay (FRA)	Erich Junge (GER); Gabriel Marcillac (FRA)	Emile Aerts (BEL); Jules Van Hevel (BEL)
1927 (I)	Willie Lorenz (GER); Alessandro Tonani (ITA)	Paul Buschenhagen (GER); Emile Thollembeek (BEL)	Paul Koch (GER); Pierre Rielens (BEL)
1927 (II)	Piet van Kempen (NED); Maurice Dewolf (BEL)	Oskar Tietz (GER); Emile Thollembeek (BEL)	Georg Kroschel (GER); Lothar Ehmer (GER)
1928	Georg Kroschel (GER); Lothar Ehmer (GER)	Oskar Tietz (GER); Willy Rieger (GER)	Emil Richli (SUI); Piet van Kempen (NED)
1929 (I)	Franz Duelberg (GER); Otto Petri (GER)	Alfons Goossens (BEL); Gérard Debaets (BEL)	Georg Kroschel (GER); Erich Junge (GER)
1929 (II)	Erich Dorn (GER); Erich Maczynski (GER)	Georg Kroschel (GER); Lothar Ehmer (GER)	Gottfried Hürtgen (GER); Werner Miethe (GER)
1930 (I)	Piet van Kempen (NED); Paul Buschenhagen (GER)	Georg Kroschel (GER); Willy Rieger (GER)	Jan Pijnenburg (NED); Karl Göbel (GER)
1930 (II)	Viktor Rausch (GER); Gottfried Hürtgen (GER)	Piet van Kempen (NED); Adolf Schön (GER)	Georg Kroschel (GER); Willy Rieger (GER)
1931 (I)	Jan Pijnenburg (NED); Adolf Schön (GER)	Emil Thollembeek (BEL); Oskar Tietz (GER)	Karl Göbel (GER); Alfredo Dinale (ITA)
1931 (II)	Paul Broccardo (FRA); Oskar Tietz (GER)	Karl Göbel (GER); Adolf Schön (GER)	Willy Funda (GER); Adolphe Charlier (BEL)
1932 (I)	Paul Broccardo (FRA); Oskar Tietz (GER)	Gottfried Hürtgen (GER); Viktor Rausch (GER)	Roger Deneef (BEL); Adolphe Charlier (BEL)
1932 (II)	Paul Broccardo (FRA); Marcel Guimbretière (FRA)	Willy Funda (GER); Adolf Schön (GER)	Lothar Ehmer (GER); Willy Rieger (GER)
1933	Roger Deneef (BEL); Albert Buysse (BEL)	Adolphe Charlier (BEL); Oskar Tietz (GER)	Karl Göbel (GER); Adolf Schön (GER)
1934	Walter Lohmann (GER); Viktor Rausch (GER)	Frans Slaats (BEL); Adolphe Van Nevele (BEL)	Werner Ippen (GER); Hans Zims (GER)
1935– 1948	Not raced		
1949	Ferdinando Terruzzi (ITA); Severino Rigoni (ITA)	Alfred Strom (AUS); Reginald Arnold (AUS)	Ludwig Hörmann (FRG); Lucien Gillen (LUX)
1950 (I)	Alfred Strom (AUS); Reginald Arnold (AUS)	Jean Roth (SUI); Gustav Kilian (FRG)	Robert Naeye (BEL); Ludwig Hörmann (FRG)
1950 (II)	Alfred Strom (AUS); Reginald Arnold (AUS)	Bernard Bouvard (FRA); Henri Surbatis (FRA)	Rudi Mirke (FRG); Hans Preiskeit (FRG)
1951 (I)	Heinz Vöpel (FRG); Gustav Kilian (FRG)	Severino Rigoni (ITA); Ferdinando Terruzzi (ITA)	Guy Lapébie (FRA); Lucien Gillen (LUX)
1951 (II)	Guy Lapébie (FRA); Émile Carrara (FRA)	Alfred Strom (AUS); Reginald Arnold (AUS)	Walter Bucher (SUI); Armin von Büren (SUI)
1952 (I)	Guy Lapébie (FRA); Émile Carrara (FRA)	Jean Roth (SUI); Armin von Büren (SUI)	Heinz Zoll (FRG); Waldemar Knoke (FRG)
1952 (II)	Heinz Zoll (FRG); Émile Carrara (FRA)	Jean Roth (SUI); Walter Bucher (SUI)	Hans Preiskeit (FRG); Walter Zehnder (SUI)
1953	Jean Roth (SUI); Walter Bucher (SUI)	Hans Ziege (FRG); Théo Intra (FRG)	Ferdinand Kübler (SUI); Oscar Plattner (SUI)
1954 (I)	Gerrit Peters (NED); Gerrit Schulte (NED)	Roger Godeau (FRA); Georges Senfftleben (FRA)	Jean Roth (SUI); Walter Bucher (SUI)
1954 (II)	Dominique Forlini (FRA); Émile Carrara (FRA)	Constant Ockers (BEL); Rik Van Steenbergen (BEL)	Hans Ziege (FRG); Horst Holzmann (FRG)
1955	Ferdinando Terruzzi (ITA); Lucien Gillen (LUX)	Kay-Werner Nielsen (DEN); Evan Klamer (DEN)	Sid Patterson (AUS); Rik Van Steenbergen (BEL)
1956	Jean Roth (SUI); Walter Bucher (SUI)	Hans Ziege (FRG); Ferdinando Terruzzi (ITA)	Kay-Werner Nielsen (DEN); Evan Klamer (DEN)
1957	Emile Severeyns (BEL); Rik Van Steenbergen (BEL)	Reginald Arnold (AUS); Ferdinando Terruzzi (ITA)	Klaus Bugdahl (FRG); Gerrit Schulte (NED)
1958	Klaus Bugdahl (FRG); Gerrit Schulte (NED)	Emile Severeyns (BEL); Rik Van Steenbergen (BEL)	Kay-Werner Nielsen (DEN); Palle Lykke Jensen (DEN)
1959	Kay-Werner Nielsen (DEN); Palle Lykke Jensen (DEN)	Emile Severeyns (BEL); Rik Van Steenbergen (BEL)	Klaus Bugdahl (FRG); Hans Jarosczewicz (FRG)
1960	Peter Post (NED); Rik Van Looy (BEL)	Klaus Bugdahl (FRG); Hans Junkermann (FRG)	Kay-Werner Nielsen (DEN); Palle Lykke Jensen (DEN)
1961 (I)	Rik Van Steenbergen (BEL); Klaus Bugdahl (FRG)	Peter Post (NED); Rik Van Looy (BEL)	Kay-Werner Nielsen (DEN); Palle Lykke Jensen (DEN)
1961 (II)	Klaus Bugdahl (FRG); Fritz Pfenninger (SUI)	Peter Post (NED); Rik Van Looy (BEL)	Emile Severeyns (BEL); Rik Van Steenbergen (BEL)
1962 (I)	Peter Post (NED); Rik Van Looy (BEL)	Klaus Bugdahl (FRG); Fritz Pfenninger (SUI)	Emile Severeyns (BEL); Rik Van Steenbergen (BEL)
1962 (II)	Rudi Altig (FRG); Hans Junkermann (FRG)	Rik Van Looy (BEL); Peter Post (NED)	Emile Severeyns (BEL); Rik Van Steenbergen (BEL)
1963	Sigi Renz (FRG); Klaus Bugdahl (FRG)	Rik Van Looy (BEL); Rik Van Steenbergen (BEL)	Freddy Eugen (DEN); Palle Lykke Jensen (DEN)
1964 (I)	Sigi Renz (FRG); Klaus Bugdahl (FRG)	Freddy Eugen (DEN); Palle Lykke Jensen (DEN)	Wolfgang Schulze (FRG); Fritz Pfenninger (SUI)
1964 (II)	Peter Post (NED); Fritz Pfenninger (SUI)	Freddy Eugen (DEN); Hans Junkermann (FRG)	Sigi Renz (FRG); Klemens Grossimlinghaus (FRG)
1965 (I)	Fritz Pfenninger (SUI); Peter Post (NED)	Sigi Renz (FRG); Klaus Bugdahl (FRG)	Dieter Kemper (FRG); Horst Oldenburg (FRG)
1965 (II)	Dieter Kemper (FRG); Rudi Altig (FRG)	Sigi Renz (FRG); Wolfgang Schulze (FRG)	Fritz Pfenninger (SUI); Peter Post (NED)
1966 (I)	Sigi Renz (FRG); Klaus Bugdahl (FRG)	Fritz Pfenninger (SUI); Peter Post (NED)	Freddy Eugen (DEN); Palle Lykke Jensen (DEN)
1966 (II)	Sigi Renz (FRG); Rudi Altig (FRG)	Freddy Eugen (DEN); Palle Lykke Jensen (DEN)	Wolfgang Schulze (FRG); Klaus Bugdahl (FRG)
1967 (I)	Horst Oldenburg (FRG); Dieter Kemper (FRG)	Wolfgang Schulze (FRG); Sigi Renz (FRG)	Patrick Sercu (BEL); Klaus Bugdahl (FRG)
1967 (II)	Peter Post (NED); Klaus Bugdahl (FRG)	Patrick Sercu (BEL); Eddy Merckx (BEL)	Horst Oldenburg (FRG); Dieter Kemper (FRG)
1968 (I)	Freddy Eugen (DEN); Palle Lykke Jensen (DEN)	Horst Oldenburg (FRG); Dieter Kemper (FRG)	Wolfgang Schulze (FRG); Sigi Renz (FRG)
1968 (II)	Peter Post (NED); Wolfgang Schulze (FRG)	Klaus Bugdahl (FRG); Rolf Wolfshohl (FRG)	Freddy Eugen (DEN); Palle Lykke Jensen (DEN)
1969 (I)	Horst Oldenburg (FRG); Wolfgang Schulze (FRG)	Peter Post (NED); Patrick Sercu (BEL)	Klaus Bugdahl (FRG); Sigi Renz (FRG)
1969 (II)	Klaus Bugdahl (FRG); Dieter Kemper (FRG)	Horst Oldenburg (FRG); Wolfgang Schulze (FRG)	Peter Post (NED); Léo Duyndam (NED)
1970 (I)	Sigi Renz (FRG); Wolfgang Schulze (FRG)	Alain van Lancker (FRA); Peter Post (NED)	Dieter Puschel (FRG); Albert Fritz (FRG)
1970 (II)	Klaus Bugdahl (FRG); Jürgen Tschan (FRG)	Patrick Sercu (BEL); Albert Fritz (FRG)	Albert Fritz (SUI); Peter Post (NED)
1971	Patrick Sercu (BEL); Peter Post (NED)	Sigi Renz (FRG); Wolfgang Schulze (FRG)	Wilfried Peffgen (FRG); René Pijnen (NED)
1972	René Pijnen (NED); Léo Duyndam (NED)	Sigi Renz (FRG); Wolfgang Schulze (FRG)	Wilfried Peffgen (FRG); Albert Fritz (FRG)
1973	Sigi Renz (FRG); Wolfgang Schulze (FRG)	Graeme Gilmore (AUS); Dieter Kemper (FRG)	Léo Duyndam (NED); Piet De Wit (NED)
1974	René Pijnen (NED); Roy Schuiten (NED)	Wilfried Peffgen (FRG); Jürgen Tschan (FRG)	Klaus Bugdahl (FRG); Dieter Kemper (FRG)
1975	Patrick Sercu (BEL); Dietrich Thurau (FRG)	Wilfried Peffgen (FRG); Jürgen Tschan (FRG)	Wolfgang Schulze (FRG); Albert Fritz (FRG)
1976	Dietrich Thurau (FRG); Günter Haritz (FRG)	René Pijnen (NED); Patrick Sercu (BEL)	Donald Allan (AUS); Danny Clark (AUS)
1977	Patrick Sercu (BEL); Eddy Merckx (BEL)	René Pijnen (NED); Dietrich Thurau (FRG)	Wilfried Peffgen (FRG); Albert Fritz (FRG)
1978	Patrick Sercu (BEL); Dietrich Thurau (FRG)	Wilfried Peffgen (FRG); Albert Fritz (FRG)	Günter Haritz (FRG); René Pijnen (NED)
1979	Patrick Sercu (BEL); Dietrich Thurau (FRG)	Wilfried Peffgen (FRG); Albert Fritz (FRG)	Donald Allan (AUS); Danny Clark (AUS)
1980	Patrick Sercu (BEL); Gregor Braun (FRG)	Donald Allan (AUS); Danny Clark (AUS)	Wilfried Peffgen (FRG); René Pijnen (NED)
1981	Dietrich Thurau (FRG); Gregor Braun (FRG)	Gert Frank (DEN); Hans-Henrik Ørsted (DEN)	Wilfried Peffgen (FRG); Horst Schütz (FRG)
1982	Patrick Sercu (BEL); Maurizio Bidinost (ITA)	Wilfried Peffgen (FRG); Horst Schütz (FRG)	Dietrich Thurau (FRG); Albert Fritz (FRG)
1983	Tony Doyle (GBR); Danny Clark (AUS)	Gert Frank (DEN); Hans-Henrik Ørsted (DEN)	Gregor Braun (FRG); Henry Rinklin (FRG)
1984	Danny Clark (AUS); Horst Schütz (FRG)	Gert Frank (DEN); Hans-Henrik Ørsted (DEN)	Josef Kristen (FRG); Henry Rinklin (FRG)
1985	Danny Clark (AUS); Hans-Henrik Ørsted (DEN)	Constant Tourné (BEL); Etienne De Wilde (BEL)	Tony Doyle (GBR); Joaquim Schlaphoff (FRG)
1986	Tony Doyle (GBR); Danny Clark (AUS)	René Pijnen (NED); Urs Freuler (SUI)	Constant Tourné (BEL); Etienne De Wilde (BEL)
1987	Dietrich Thurau (FRG); Urs Freuler (SUI)	Tony Doyle (GBR); Danny Clark (AUS)	Roland Günther (FRG); Roman Hermann (LIE)
1988	Tony Doyle (GBR); Danny Clark (AUS)	Dietrich Thurau (FRG); Urs Freuler (SUI)	Pierangelo Bincoletto (ITA); Roman Hermann (LIE)
1989	Not raced		
1990	Volker Diehl (FRG); Bruno Holenweger (SUI)	Roland Günther (FRG); Danny Clark (AUS)	Pierangelo Bincoletto (ITA); Andreas Klaus (FRG)
1991– 1996	Not raced		
1997	Olaf Ludwig (GER); Jens Veggerby (DEN)	Marco Villa (ITA); Adriano Baffi (ITA)	Andreas Kappes (GER); Carsten Wolf (GER)
1998	Marco Villa (ITA); Silvio Martinello (ITA)	Adriano Baffi (ITA); Andreas Kappes (GER)	Gerd Dörich (GER); Carsten Wolf (GER)
1999	Etienne De Wilde (BEL); Andreas Kappes (GER)	Jimmi Madsen (DEN); Carsten Wolf (GER)	Adriano Baffi (ITA); Andrea Collinelli (ITA)
2000	Marco Villa (ITA); Silvio Martinello (ITA)	Andreas Kappes (GER); Olaf Pollack (GER)	Robert Bartko (GER); Scott McGrory (AUS)
2001	Rolf Aldag (GER); Silvio Martinello (ITA)	Andreas Kappes (GER); Andreas Beikirch (GER)	Stefan Steinweg (GER); Erik Weispfennig (GER)
2002	Rolf Aldag (GER); Silvio Martinello (ITA)	Matthew Gilmore (BEL); Scott McGrory (AUS)	Robert Bartko (GER); Andreas Beikirch (GER)
2003	Kurt Betschart (SUI); Bruno Risi (SUI)	Marco Villa (ITA); Silvio Martinello (ITA)	Andreas Beikirch (GER); Andreas Kappes (GER)
2004	Robert Bartko (GER); Guido Fulst (GER)	Marco Villa (ITA); Franco Marvulli (SUI)	Andreas Beikirch (GER); Andreas Kappes (GER)
2005	Kurt Betschart (SUI); Bruno Risi (SUI)	Robert Bartko (GER); Guido Fulst (GER)	Danny Stam (NED); Robert Slippens (NED)
2006	Danny Stam (NED); Robert Slippens (NED)	Marco Villa (ITA); Franco Marvulli (SUI)	Leif Lampater (GER); Guido Fulst (GER)
2007	Leif Lampater (GER); Guido Fulst (GER)	Andreas Beikirch (GER); Robert Bartko (GER)	Bruno Risi (SUI); Franco Marvulli (SUI)
2008	Bruno Risi (SUI); Franco Marvulli (SUI)	Leif Lampater (GER); Guido Fulst (GER)	Christian Lademann (GER); Alexander Äschbach (BEL)
2009	Erik Zabel (GER); Robert Bartko (GER)	Bruno Risi (SUI); Franco Marvulli (SUI)	Kenny De Ketele (BEL); Roger Kluge (GER)
2010	Alex Rasmussen (DEN); Michael Mørkøv (DEN)	Robert Bartko (GER); Roger Kluge (GER)	Danny Stam (NED); Peter Schep (NED)
2011	Robert Bartko (GER); Roger Kluge (GER)	Leigh Howard (AUS); Cameron Meyer (AUS)	Alex Rasmussen (DEN); Michael Mørkøv (DEN)
2012	Leigh Howard (AUS); Cameron Meyer (AUS)	Franco Marvulli (SUI); Silvan Dillier (SUI)	Iljo Keisse (BEL); Kenny De Ketele (BEL)
2013	Roger Kluge (GER); Peter Schep (NED)	Kenny De Ketele (BEL); Keuke Roberts (AUS)	Franco Marvulli (SUI); Andreas Müller (AUT)
2014	Kenny De Ketele (BEL); Andreas Müller (AUT)	Leif Lampater (GER); Jasper De Buyst (BEL)	Robert Bartko (GER); Theo Reinhardt (GER)
2015	Leif Lampater (GER); Marcel Kalz (GER)	Kenny De Ketele (BEL); David Muntaner (ESP)	Alex Rasmussen (DEN); Marc Hester (DEN)
2016	Kenny De Ketele (BEL); Moreno De Pauw (BEL)	Roger Kluge (GER); Marcel Kalz (GER)	Yoeri Havik (NED); Nick Stopler (NED)
2017	Yoeri Havik (NED); Wim Stroetinga (NED)	Kenny De Ketele (BEL); Moreno De Pauw (BEL)	Pim Ligthart (NED); Jens Mouris (NED)
2018	Yoeri Havik (NED); Wim Stroetinga (NED)	Kenny De Ketele (BEL); Moreno De Pauw (BEL)	Roger Kluge (GER); Theo Reinhardt (GER)
2019	Roger Kluge (GER); Theo Reinhardt (GER)	Marc Hester (DEN); Jesper Mørkøv (DEN)	Andreas Müller (AUT); Andreas Graf (AUT)
2020	Wim Stroetinga (NED); Moreno De Pauw (BEL)	Marc Hester (DEN); Oliver Wulff Frederiksen (DEN)	Morgan Kneisky (FRA); Theo Reinhardt (GER)
2021–2022	Not raced		
2023	(Germany) Theo Reinhardt (Germany) Roger Kluge	(Netherlands) Yoeri Havik (Netherlands) Vincent Hoppezak	(Germany) Moritz Malcharek (Germany) Tim Torn Teutenberg
2024	(Netherlands) Yoeri Havik (Netherlands) Jan-Willem van Schip	(Germany) Theo Reinhardt (Germany) Roger Kluge	(Germany) Moritz Malcharek (Germany) Moritz Augenstein
2025	(Germany) Theo Reinhardt (Germany) Roger Kluge	(Netherlands) Yoeri Havik (Netherlands) Philip Heijnen	(Italy) Elia Viviani (Italy) Michele Scartezzini
