= Madison (cycling) =

Style of cycling race

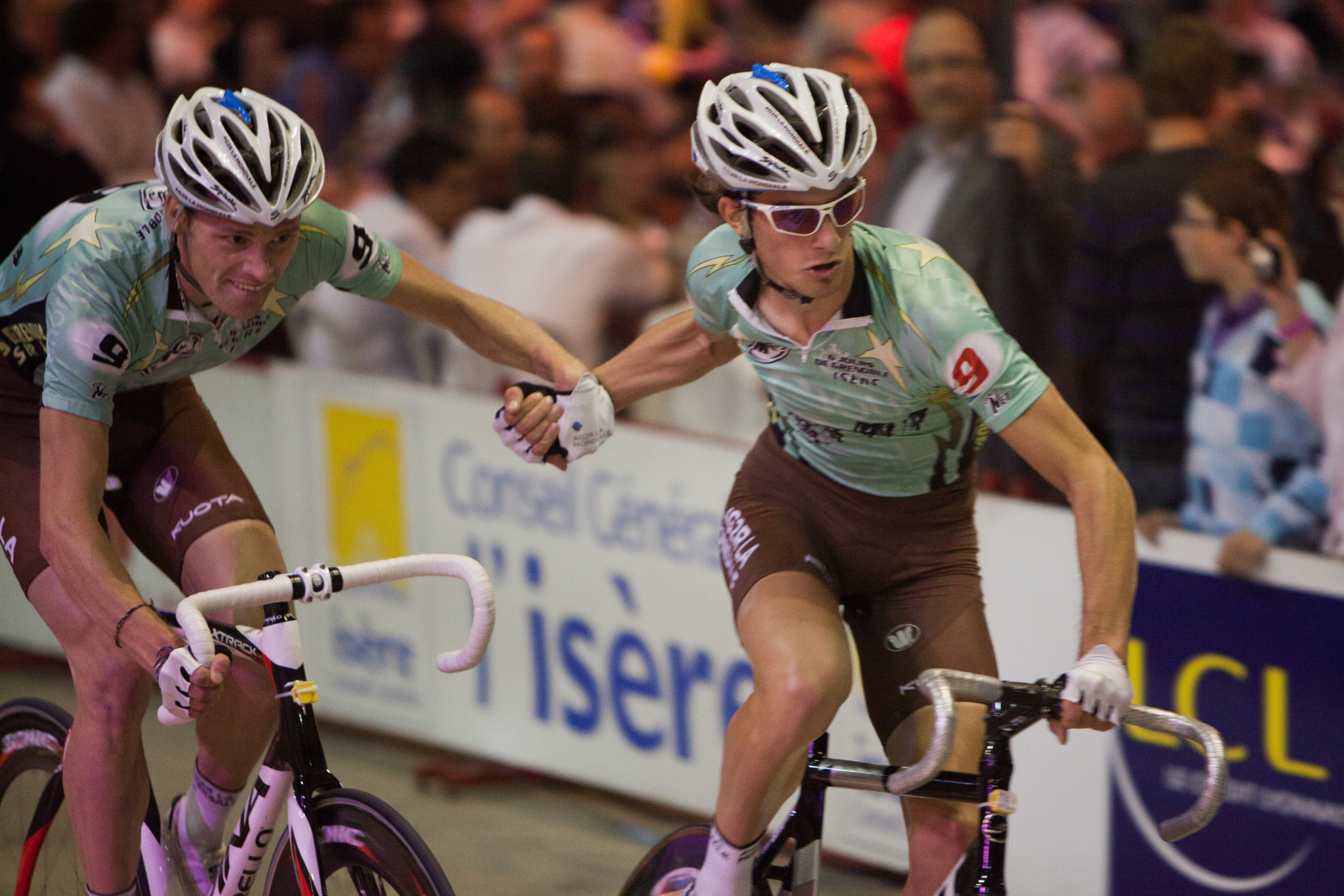
One racer propels his partner like a slingshot during a Madison race

The Madison is a relay race event in track cycling, named after the first Madison Square Garden in New York, and known as the "American race" in French (course à l'américaine) and as Americana in Spanish and in Italian.

== The race ==
The Madison is a race in which the team which completes the most laps wins. Tied positions are split by points awarded for placings at a series of sprints at intervals during the race. Teams usually have two riders but occasionally three. Riders in each team take turns, with only one rider per team racing at any time. After resting, riders can return to the race. To take over, the replacement rider has to be touched, pushed, often on the shorts, or hurled by the departing team member by a hand-sling.

How long each rider stays in the race is for the rider's team to decide. Originally, riders took stints of several hours and the resting rider could sleep or have a meal. That was easier in earlier six-day races because hours could pass without riders attempting to break away from the others. As races became more intensive, both riders from a team began riding simultaneously, one going fast on the shortest racing line around the base of the track and the other idling higher up until that rider's turn to take over. Modern six-day races last less than 12 hours a day and the Madison is now only a featured part, so staying on the track throughout is more feasible.

The Madison is a feature of six-day races, but it can also be a separate race, as in the Olympic Games. It has its own championships and specialist riders. UCI-sanctioned Madison races have a total distance of 50 kilometers (31 mi).

== History ==
The Madison began as a way of circumventing laws passed in New York in the US, aimed at restricting the exhaustion of cyclists taking part in six-day races.

According to a contemporary newspaper clipping retained by Major Taylor:

The riders are becoming peevish and fretful. The wear and tear upon their nerves and their muscles, and the loss of sleep make them so. If their desires are not met with on the moment, they break forth with a stream of abuse. Nothing pleases them. These outbreaks do not trouble the trainers with experience, for they understand the condition the men are in.

The condition included delusions and hallucinations. Riders wobbled and frequently fell. But the riders were often well paid, especially since more people came to watch them as their condition worsened. Promoters in New York paid Teddy Hale $5,000 when he won in 1896 and he won "like a ghost, his face as white as a corpse, his eyes no longer visible because they'd retreated into his skull," as one report had it.

The New York Times said in 1897:

An athletic contest in which participants "go queer" in their heads, and strain their powers until their faces become hideous with the tortures that rack them, is not sport. It is brutality. Days and weeks of recuperation will be needed to put the Garden racers in condition, and it is likely that some of them will never recover from the strain.

Alarmed, New York and Illinois ruled in 1898 that no competitor could race for more than 12 hours a day. The promoter of the event at Madison Square Garden, reluctant to close his stadium for half the day, realized that giving each rider a partner with whom he could share the racing meant the race could still go on 24 hours a day but that no one rider would exceed the 12-hour limit. Speeds rose, distances grew, crowds increased, money poured in. Where Charlie Miller rode 2,088 miles (3,360 km) alone, the Australian Alf Goullet and a decent partner could ride 2,790 miles (4,490 km).

The fastest known average speed of a Madison men's race is 59.921 kilometers per hour (37.233 mph), achieved by the Australian duo of Sam Welsford and Leigh Howard, at the world cup race in Glasgow, United Kingdom, 9 November 2019.

=== Origins of the name Madison Racing ===
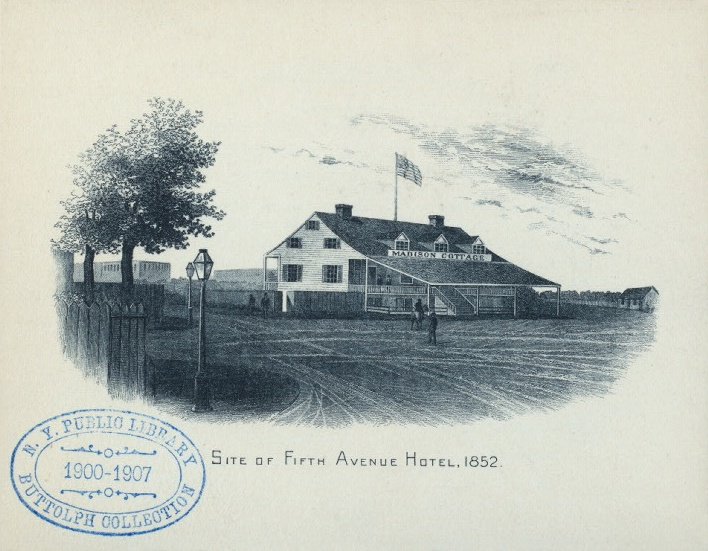
"Madison Cottage" on the site of the Fifth Avenue Hotel at Madison Square, NYC, 1852

The term Madison Racing derives essentially from a sequence of local New York City names honoring President James Madison. A lodge had been built at what was then the prominent and northernmost waypoint into and out of New York City. In honor of the recently deceased president, the cottage was named Madison Cottage. After the demise of Madison cottage, the site gave rise to a park, in turn named Madison Square, which remains today.

A series of four sports venues subsequently took their names from Madison Square — each named, one after the other, Madison Square Gardens. The first two were located directly adjacent to (and took their name from) Madison Square. The second Madison Square Gardens (1890–1925) became a prominent cycling venue, and gave rise to the track cycle racing that ultimately carried the name Madison Racing.

== Rules and format ==
The Madison is governed by a detailed set of rules, which are often regarded as being hard to follow. According to British Cycling, the main governing body for cycling in the United Kingdom, teams consist of two or three riders wearing matching colours and numbers, although major international competitions such as the Olympics and World Championships are contested by pairs. At all times during the race, only one rider from each team is actively competing, while teammates may relieve one another at any point. Exchanges are carried out below the stayers line, near the inside edge of the track, and involve one rider drawing level with the other and making physical contact—either by a push or a handling—to signal the changeover. The relieved rider must then move above the stayers line as soon as it is safe to do so.

Since the objective of the race is to gain laps on opposing teams, the team that gains the most laps is declared the winner. If multiple teams finished on the same lap, the result is determined by the number of sprint points gained during the race. If teams are tied on both laps and points, the final sprint placing determines the winner. The race ends when the leading team has completed specified distance, and teams that have been lapped are ranked according to the number of laps by which they are behind the winners.

At designated intervals, intermediate sprints are held, with the first four teams across the line gaining 5, 3, 2, and 1 points, respectively. A whistle signals one lap remaining before a sprint, and a bell indicates the start of the final lap. Teams that gain or lose laps during the race remain eligible to score sprint points.

In the event of a mechanical issue or other mishap, a rider may temporarily withdraw but is permitted to rejoin the race. During this period, the remaining teammate must continue racing and, if necessary, may be paired by the Chief Commissaire with a. rider from another team in a similar position, alternating participation until the affect rider returns. Teams withdrawing from the race are required to notify the Chief Commissaire immediately.

Race officials retain broad authority to enforce rules and ensure safety. Penalties for misconduct or dangerous riding may include the loss of points, loss of laps, or disqualification. The Chief Commissaire may neutralize the race in the event of unsafe conditions, terminate it before the full distance if necessary, or remove teams that have fallen excessively behind or are deemed a hazard to others.

== Olympics ==
The Madison was an Olympic event for men in 2000, 2004 and 2008, but was dropped ahead of the 2012 London Olympics, in part for reasons of gender equality as there was no equivalent race for women at that time.

In June 2017, the International Olympic Committee announced that the Madison would be added to the Olympic programme for the 2020 Summer Olympics. The 2020 Games includes a relaunch of the men's Madison event, as well as the introduction of the women's Madison as an Olympic event for the first time. The inaugural women's event was won by Katie Archibald and Laura Kenny for Team GB.

== Records ==
=== Points ===
Men

Format	Points	Team	Event	Date	Location	Ref
U16	30	(United Kingdom) Oscar Nilsson-Julien; Jack Rootkin-Gray	HSBC UK National Youth and Junior Track Championships N.Y.O	23 July 2018	Geraint Thomas National Velodrome of Wales, Newport International Sports Village, Newport, Wales	
U16	30	(United Kingdom) Jack Brough; Joshua Giddings	HSBC UK 2019 National Youth and Junior Track Championships N.Y.O	5 August 2019	Geraint Thomas National Velodrome of Wales, Newport International Sports Village, Newport, Wales	
Youth	9	(United Kingdom) Thomas Bostock; William Draper	British Cycling Junior & Youth A National Track Championships	1 August 2016	Derby Velodrome, Derby, England	
Junior (30 km)	56	(Russia) Ilia Schegolkov; Vlas Shichkin	2019 UEC European Track Championships (under-23 & junior)	9–14 July 2019	Vlaams Wielercentrum Eddy Merckx, Ghent, Belgium	
U23 (50 km)	121	(United Kingdom) Matthew Walls; Ethan Hayter	2018 UEC European Track Championships (under-23 & junior)	21–26 August 2018	World Cycling Centre, Aigle, Switzerland	
50 km	129	(New Zealand) Aaron Gate; Campbell Stewart	2019–20 UCI Track Cycling World Cup	6–8 December 2019	Avantidrome, Cambridge, New Zealand	
50 km Olympic	43	(Denmark) Lasse Norman Hansen; Michael Mørkøv	2020 Summer Olympics	7 August 2021	Izu Velodrome, Shizuoka Prefecture, Japan	
30 km	76	(New Zealand) Campbell Stewart; Aaron Gate	2018–19 UCI Track Cycling World Cup	18–20 January 2019	Avantidrome, Cambridge, New Zealand	
World Cup	2000	(Denmark) Lasse Norman Hansen; Michael Mørkøv; Casper von Folsach; Julius Johansen	2018–19 UCI Track Cycling World Cup	19 November 2018 – 27 January 2019	Various	
World Cup (Old scoring)	32	(Germany) Roger Kluge; Robert Bartko; Robert Bengsch; Marcel Kalz; Marcel Barth; Erik Mohs	2009–10 UCI Track Cycling World Cup Classics	30 October 2009 – 24 January 2010	Various	
20 km	11	(United Kingdom) Ross Sander; Geraint Thomas	2005–06 UCI Track Cycling World Cup Classics	11 December 2005	Manchester Velodrome, Manchester, England	
20 km	11	(Russia) Mikhail Ignatiev; Nikolay Trussov	2005–06 UCI Track Cycling World Cup Classics	22 January 2006	VELO Sports Center, Los Angeles, United States	
40 km	28	(Switzerland) Alexander Aeschbach; Franco Marvulli	2001 UCI Track Cycling World Cup Classics	26 August 2001	Velodrome Rakyat, Ipoh, Malaysia	
80 km	45	(United Kingdom) Bryan Steel; Robert Hayles	1994 British National Track Championships	30 July 1994	Herne Hill Velodrome, London, England	

Women

Format	Points	Team	Event	Date	Location	Ref
U16	30	(United Kingdom) Emma Finucane; Sophie Lewis	HSBC UK National Youth and Junior Track Championships N.Y.O	23 July 2018	Geraint Thomas National Velodrome of Wales, Newport International Sports Village, Newport, Wales	
U16	30	(United Kingdom) Zoe Backstedt; Millie Couzens	HSBC UK 2019 National Youth and Junior Track Championships N.Y.O	5 August 2019	Geraint Thomas National Velodrome of Wales, Newport International Sports Village, Newport, Wales	
Youth	9	(United Kingdom) Anna Docherty; Pfeiffer Georgi	British Cycling Junior & Youth A National Track Championships	1 August 2016	Derby Velodrome, Derby, England	
Junior (20 km)	32	(Italy)	2017 UEC European Track Championships (under-23 & junior)	19–23 July 2017	Sangalhos Velodrome, Sangalhos, Portugal	
U23 (50 km)	85	(Russia) Maria Novolodskaya; Diana Klimova	2018 UEC European Track Championships (under-23 & junior)	21–26 August 2018	World Cycling Centre, Aigle, Switzerland	
30 km	56	(Australia) Georgia Baker; Annette Edmondson	2019–20 UCI Track Cycling World Cup	13–15 December 2019	Anna Meares Velodrome, Brisbane, Australia	
30 km Olympic	78	(United Kingdom) Katie Archibald; Laura Kenny	2020 Summer Olympics	6 August 2021	Izu Velodrome, Shizuoka Prefecture, Japan	
20 km	39	(Belgium) Jolien D'Hoore; Lotte Kopecky	2018–19 UCI Track Cycling World Cup	18–20 January 2019	Avantidrome, Cambridge, New Zealand	
World Cup	1950	(United Kingdom) Neah Evans; Emily Kay; Katie Archibald; Elinor Barker; Laura Kenny; Emily Nelson	2018–19 UCI Track Cycling World Cup	19 November 2018 – 27 January 2019	Various	

=== Times ===
Men

Format	Time	Team	Event	Date	Location	Ref
1 km time trial	54.446 s	Rapha Condor-JLT (United Kingdom) Ed Clancy; Oliver Wood	Revolution 2014	1 February 2014	National Cycling Centre, Manchester, England	

== See also ==
- Cycling at the Summer Olympics
