= 6-Tage Rennen =

1986 board game

6-Tage Rennen (German for 6-Day Race) is a bicycle racing board game published in Germany in 1986 by Holtmann VIP as a promotional item.

== Contents ==
6-Tage Rennen is a game for 3–8 players based on the professional six-day cycling races popular in Europe in the 1950s. In the game, players compete in a series of single-lap races and try to be the first cyclist to cross the finish line in each one. Because no player has enough cards to complete one lap, they must use the power of slipstreaming in order to cross the finish line.

=== Components ===
The game box holds:

- Board with oval race track of 81 spaces. The race track has a Start/Finish line, as well as two special spaces: "Fahrerwechsel" ("Driver change") and "Sturz" ("Fall")
- 8 plastic cyclist tokens
- a green deck of 120 cards with numbers ranging from 1 to 7 (but with no #6)
- a grey deck of 80 cards with numbers from 1–6
- a rule book
- a pad of scoresheets

=== Setup ===
Players decide how many races will be run. As the title of the game suggests, six races is considered optimal. Each player chooses a bicycle token and places it behind the start line, and a starting player is chosen.

Each player then receives green cards:

- For 3-5 players: four 1 and 2 cards, three 3 and 4 cards, two 5 cards, and one 7 card.
- For 6-8 players, three 1 and 2 cards.

These are the only green cards the players get for the race. Excess green cards are set aside and not used for the rest of the race.

The grey deck is separated into cards 1–3 and cards 4–6. Each half deck is shuffled and placed on the appropriate space on the board.

=== Gameplay ===
Each race is one lap, with play moving clockwise around the table.

The active player can play any card in their hand, and moves their token forward the number of spaces indicated. If the cyclist ends its turn on a space occupied by other cyclists, then it gains a slipstreaming bonus: for every cyclist in the space, the active cyclist adds the original movement number on the card played to its movement. So if a player lands

- on an unoccupied space, there is no slipstreaming bonus and the player's turn ends.
- on a space already occupied by one bicycle, the token's move is doubled (the card's number is added to the movement already taken).
- on a space already occupied by two cyclists, its movement is tripled (the card's number is added twice to the movement already taken).
- And so on.

Example: A player plays a 4-card and lands on a space with three other riders. Due to slipstreaming, the token moves an extra 12 spaces (4 spaces x 3 cyclists) in addition to its original move of 4 spaces, for a total movement of 16 spaces.

The slipstreaming bonus only happens the first time the token ends its move. If the token is able to move bonus spaces due to slipstreaming and lands on another space with one or more cyclists, it does not get another bonus move.

=== Special spaces ===
If a player lands on the "Fahrerwechsel" ("Driver change") space, the player is forced to change riders. The player discards all of their green cards and draws four cards from the grey 4–6 deck, and six cards from the grey 1–3 deck. (If there are 3–5 players, the player draws seven cards from the grey 1–3 deck.)

If a player lands on the "Sturz" ("Fall") space, the rider has fallen from their bike and the player loses their next turn.

Slipstreaming is not allowed on either of these spaces.

=== Race points and laps down ===
Points are scored three times during a race. The first four riders to cross the two sprint lines score 5, 3, 2, and 1 point respectively. The first rider to cross the finish line scores 10 points, and the other players have one more turn to try to cross the finish line. The second player scores 6 points, third scores 4 points and the fourth scores 2 points. If four riders do not cross the finish line, the riders closest to the finish line score the points, dividing them equally if there is a tie.

At the end of the race, any rider who has not crossed the finish line is judged to be a lap down for every four spaces their token is from the finish line, to a maximum of five laps down.

=== Victory conditions ===
At the end of the set number of races, the player with the least number of laps down is the winner. If there is a tie in laps down, the player with the most race points wins.

=== Balancing rule (optional) ===
Optionally, players can change the order of player after each race by inverting the victory placement from the previous race, with the last-place player going first, second last going second, etc., and the first-place player going last.

== Publication history ==
Six-day cycle racing reached the height of its popularity in Europe in the 1950s, but had disappeared by the 1980s. In 1986, German cycling manager Winfried Holtmann revived six-day races in Stuttgart, Münster and Leipzig. As part of the promotion for the races, Holtmann and German game designer Walter Toncar designed the board game 6-Tage Rennen, which was subsequently published by Holtmann's company Holtmann VIP.

== Reception ==
Brian Walker reviewed 6-Tage Rennen for Games International magazine, and gave it 5 stars out of 5, and stated that "Whichever way you play it I'm sure you'll find it both extremely baffling and enjoyable in about equal proportions."

In The Game Cabinet, Bob Rossney noted the strategy requires players to "continuously strike a balance between staying with the pack, getting the most out of your cards, and keeping a good mix of denominations (races are often lost by not having the one card that would let you slipstream past the finish line)." He liked the fact that "There's almost no luck in the game [...] so among players of similar ability a given race can be a very close thing." He concluded by calling it "a tremendously exciting game."
