= Oskar Tietz (cyclist) =

German cyclist

Personal information
- Born: 18 October 1895
- Died: 16 May 1975 (aged 79)

Cycling career
- Sport: Cycling
- Discipline: Road
- Role: Rider

Oskar Tietz (18 October 1895 – 16 May 1975) was a German racing cyclist. He rode in the 1930 Tour de France.
