= Peter Panton =

Australian racing cyclist

Personal information
- Full name: Peter Panton
- Born: 3 June 1932 (age 94)

Cycling career
- Sport: Cycling
- Role: Rider

Peter Panton (born 3 June 1932) is a former Australian racing cyclist. He finished in second place in the Australian National Road Race Championships in 1958. He was also winner of the Sun Tour in 1959 and 1960.
