= Six Day Series =

Annual track cycling series

Race details
- Date: October – April
- Region: London (since 2016); Berlin (since 2016); Copenhagen (since 2016); Melbourne (since 2019); Hong Kong (since 2019); Manchester (since 2019); Brisbane (since 2019)
- Discipline: Track
- Type: Six-day racing series
- Organiser: Madison Sports Group

History
- First edition: 2016
- Editions: 3 seasons (as of 2018–19)

The Six Day Series or Six Day Cycling Series is an annual series of track cycling events run by Madison Sports Group featuring world class cyclists. The series, organised for the first time in the 2016–17 season, was formed to develop an elite-level competition series around the globe and combines track cycling with a party atmosphere. The aim was to rejuvenate the once flagging format and provide enticing rewards for cyclists during the road cycling off season.

The series initially comprised four meetings each season, held between October and April, each held on six consecutive days. Each season ended with a final event, qualification for which was granted through the previous six day events.

The 2018–19 season consisted of seven events across five countries. With the additions of Melbourne and Brisbane in Australia, which was the first time the series ran outside of Europe. This was intended as an expansion strategy to attract new viewers and business opportunities. In January 2019, an event in Hong Kong was announced as a new stage to introduce 6-day racing to Asia. The Hong Kong and Australian rounds will be held on 3-day weekends instead of the standard 6-day format.

The COVID-19 pandemic cancelled events from 2020 until 2022. The Six Day Series returns to Berlin from January 27 to 29, 2023.

== History ==
Six Day Cycling originated in Britain in 1877. Initially, riders competed individually, with the winner being the individual who completed the most laps over six days. However, this format was changed in the early 20th century to teams of two so one rider could race while the other rested, in order to keep the race continually going.

The success of the madison format in the United States led to their introduction in Europe. The first was at Toulouse in 1906, although it was abandoned after three days because of a lack of interest. Berlin then tried the format, three years later, this time with success. Five races were held in Germany in 1911–12. Brussels followed in 1912 and Paris in 1913.

Six-day races continued to do well in Europe. Its heart was in Germany - except during the Nazi period when the races were banned - but it was strong, too, in Belgium and France. In 1923 the journalist Egon Erwin Kisch attended the tenth staging of the Six Days of Berlin and wrote a celebrated piece "Elliptische Tretmuehle" (Elliptical Treadmill). London saw one race at Olympia in July 1923, and then a series of races at Wembley starting in 1936. Local rider Frank Southall crashed and left for hospital. So did another British hope, Syd Cozens. Only nine of the 15 teams lasted the race. The series continued, with more success, until the start of World War II in 1939.

Today, the 24-hours-a-day regime has been abandoned, with the Six Day format involving six nights of racing, typically from 6pm to 2am, on indoor tracks (velodromes).

== Event hosts ==
=== Current hosts ===
Event	Venue	City	Duration	Joined 6 Day Series	Event began	Scheduled	Ref
(United Kingdom) Six Days of London	London Velodrome	London	6 days	2016–17	1923	October	
(Germany) Six Days of Berlin	Velodrom	Berlin	6 days	2016–17	1909	January	
(Denmark) Six Days of Copenhagen	Ballerup Super Arena	Copenhagen	6 days	2016–17	1933	Jan-Feb	
(Australia) Six Days of Melbourne	Melbourne Arena	Melbourne	3 days	2018–19	2019	Feb	
Six Days of Hong Kong	Hong Kong Velodrome	Hong Kong	3 days	2018–19	2019	March	
(United Kingdom) Six Days of Manchester	Manchester Velodrome	Manchester	3 days	2018–19	2019	March	
(Australia) Six Days of Brisbane (Final)	Anna Meares Velodrome	Brisbane	3 days	2018–19	2019	April	

The World Series was originally scheduled to consist of six events in the 2018–19 season. Hong Kong was added between the Melbourne and Manchester races in the latest update during January 2019.

Most of these competitions began after they were added to the World Series, but with certain exceptions. The oldest of these meetings is the Six Days of Berlin, which dates back to 1909.

Other competitions that pre-date the Series include the Six Days of London at Wembley (which ran from 1923 to 1980 intermittently and was then disbanded, until it returned in the 2016–17 season as a leg on the Series) and the Six Days of Copenhagen which began in 1933.

=== Previous hosts ===
Event	Venue	City	Duration	Joined 6 Day Series	Event began	Last race	Ref
(Netherlands) Six Days of Amsterdam	Velodrome Amsterdam	Amsterdam	6 days	2016–17	1932	2017	
(Spain) Six Days of Mallorca (Final)	Palma Arena	Mallorca	1 day	2016–17	2017	2018	

== See also ==
- Six-day racing
- Revolution (Cycling Series)
