= Teddy Hale =

British cyclist

Edward Hale
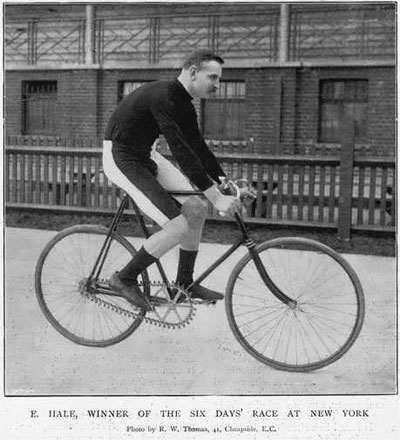

Personal information
- Full name: Edward Hale
- Nickname: Teddy Hale
- Born: 30 May 1864
- Died: 1911 (aged 46–47)

Cycling career
- Sport: Cycling
- Disciplines: Road, track
- Role: Rider

Major wins
- 1887 – North Road 100 Miles Road Race; 1896 – Six Days of New York

Edward Hale (* 30 May 1864; † 1911) was a British racing cyclist. In 1896 he won the solo-Six Days race in Madison Square Garden in New York City.

Teddy Hale started racing bikes at the age of 16 on a penny-farthing and became captain of the Gainsborough Cycling Club at the beginning of the 1880s. His first triumph was to set a new record between London and Brighton (approx. 54 miles) in three hours and 35 minutes. In 1885 he set a new 100-mile record in six hours and 59 minutes on a Kangaroo bicycle and a year later he won the prestigious 100-mile road race of the North Road Cycling Club on the Great North Road. At the second 1896 individual Six Days of London in the Agricultural Hall he achieved third place behind Welshman Arthur Linton, who would go on to win the Bordeaux-Paris race later that year, and Frenchman Gabriel Baraquin.

In 1896 Hale participates in the individual Six Days race in New York City's Madison Square Garden and wins with 1910 miles and 8 laps in a field of 30 riders, breaking the existing record by 300 miles. With this victory in front of 12,000 spectators he earned US$5,000. After the end of the race, when he allegedly continued disoriented for another ten laps, it was said: "He looked like a ghost. His face was like the white face of a corpse and he stared in front of himself, his eyes terribly fixed [...] His mind was no longer there on the track, he had lost all signs of life and self possession." He himself added: „I won, but I have given 10 years of my life away for a few thousand dollars.“ The next year, though, he participated again and obtained the third place.

Hale was referred to as Irish, but most probably originated from London. They referred to him as Irish, because he was part of the Simpson chain team, just like Tom Linton, John Dunlop Lumsden and Charley Chapple. Linton was Welsh, Lumsden Scottish, Chapple English, and accordingly they "made" Hale, for commercial reasons, probably Irish.

In February 1899, Hale was arrested in San Francisco because he allegedly didn't pay his trainer his dues. He was released, however, after promising to fulfill his debt. On 30 July of that year he started a record attempt to ride a 100 miles daily on British roads. This attempt was sponsored by Acatène, a company that produced a shaft-driven bicycle. One year later, at 31 July 1900, he completed a total of 32,496 miles with which he set a first mark for this endurance record. Afterwards Hale ended his cycling career. He died in 1911, only 47 years old, leaving behind a wife and five children.

Teddy Hale is one of the co-founders of the League of American Wheelmen.

== Palmarès ==
1886
3rd, North Road 50 Mile road race
1887
1st, North Road 100 Mile road race
1892
3rd, Six Days of London
1893
3rd, Bath Road 100 Mile road race
1894
2nd, Speedwell 100 Mile road race
4th, Amsterdam – Arnhem – Amsterdam
1896
1st, Six Days of New York
1897
3rd, Six Days of New York
