= Richard Huschke =

German cyclist

Personal information
- Born: 6 August 1893 Berlin, Germany
- Died: 11 January 1980 (aged 86) Stuttgart, Germany

Cycling career
- Sport: Cycling
- Role: Rider

Richard Huschke (6 August 1893 – 11 January 1980) was a German racing cyclist. He won the German National Road Race in 1922 and 1925.
