= Marc Hester =

Danish cyclist

Personal information
- Full name: Marc Hester Hansen
- Born: 28 June 1985 (age 41)

Cycling career
- Sport: Cycling
- Disciplines: Road; Track
- Role: Rider

Amateur teams
- 2010: Team Post Danmark
- 2016: Sorø BC

Professional teams
- 2005: Team GLS
- 2007: Team Löwik Meubelen
- 2009: Team Designa Køkken
- 2011: Christina Watches–Onfone
- 2012: Forsikring–Himmerland
- 2013: Christina Watches–Onfone
- 2014: Firefighters Upsala CK
- 2015: ONE Pro Cycling
- 2017: WIGGINS

Marc Hester Hansen (born 28 June 1985) is a Danish professional bicycle racer.

Hester rode for Firefighters Upsala CK for the 2014 season. In December 2014 Hester was announced as part of the inaugural squad for the ONE Pro Cycling team for the 2015 season.

== Major results ==
2005
2nd Scratch, UEC European Under-23 Track Championships
2006
9th Overall Mainfranken Tour
2007
2nd PWZ Zuidenveld Tour
2011
3rd Six Days of Bremen (with Jens-Erik Madsen)
2012
1st Scratch, National Track Championships
1st Six Days of Copenhagen (with Iljo Keisse)
2014
3rd Six Days of Bremen (with Andreas Müller)
2015
3rd Six Days of Berlin (with Alex Rasmussen)
2019
2nd Six Days of Berlin (with Jesper Mørkøv)
2nd Six Days of Rotterdam (with Lasse Norman Hansen)
2nd Six Days of Bremen (with Theo Reinhardt)
2020
3rd Six Days of Bremen (with Andreas Graf)
