= Kim Eriksen =

Danish cyclist

Personal information
- Born: 10 February 1964 (age 62) Silkeborg, Denmark

Cycling career
- Sport: Cycling

Kim Eriksen (born 10 February 1964) is a Danish former cyclist. He competed in the individual road race and the team time trial events at the 1984 Summer Olympics.
