= Severino Rigoni =

Italian cyclist (1914–1992)

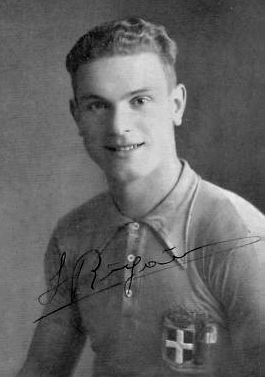

Personal information
- Born: 3 October 1914 Gallio, Italy
- Died: 14 December 1992 (aged 78) Padua, Italy

Cycling career
- Sport: Cycling
Medal record
Representing ITA
Men's cycling
Olympic Games
Silver medal – second place	1936 Berlin	4000 m team pursuit

Severino Rigoni (3 October 1914 – 14 December 1992) was an Italian cyclist who won a silver medal in the 4 km team pursuit at the 1936 Summer Olympics. After the Olympics he turned professional and competed on track in Italy (1938–45) and later on the road in Germany, United States, United Kingdom, Algeria and Brazil. He won six-day road races in Berlin (1949), New York City (1950), Münster (1951), Rio de Janeiro (1956) and São Paulo (1957). On track he won the national sprint title in 1935, placing second or third in 1934, 1936, 1938, 1940, 1943 and 1945.
