= List of cycling tracks and velodromes =

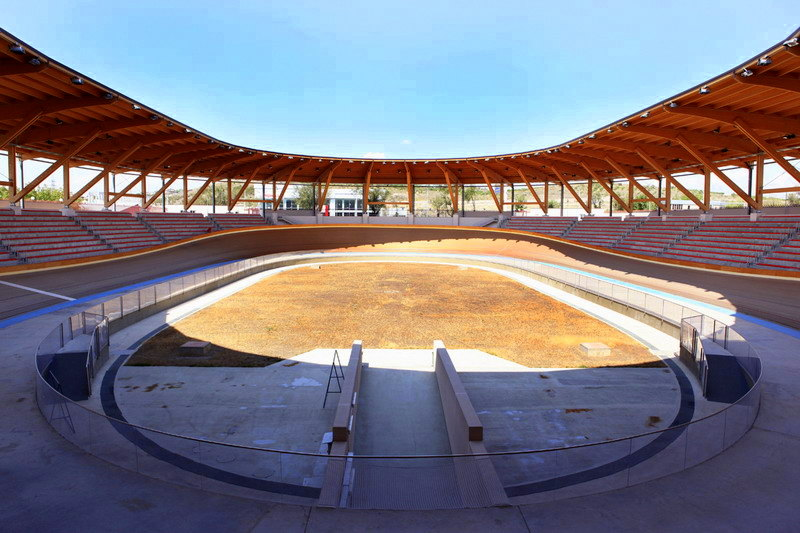
Yerevan Velodrome

This is a list of cycling tracks and velodromes for track cycling worldwide.

== Velodromes currently in use ==
Indoor: all the structures are closed inside
Outdoor: the velodrome is uncovered and in open air.
Outdoor, fully covered: all the structures are covered but in open air.
Outdoor, track covered: the track is covered but in open air.

Country	Velodrome	City	Length	Banking Corner(/Straight)	Surface	In-/Out-door	Notes	Altitude	Location
New Zealand	Taupō Velodrome	Taupō	333.33 m		concrete	Outdoor	Resurfaced 2019. LED lighting for night riding.	405 m	-38.402207, 176.55584
Argentina	Bahiense Pedal Club	Bahía Blanca	250 m	unknown	concrete	Outdoor		31 m	38.688392°S 62.273812°W
Argentina	Antonio Ríos	San Rafael, Mendoza	250 m	unknown	concrete	Outdoor		689 m	34.637118°S 68.324251°W
Argentina	Chavense Pedal Club	González Chaves	150 m	unknown	concrete	Outdoor		197 m	38.028504°S 60.102419°W
Argentina	City of Esperanza	Esperanza	250 m	unknown	concrete	Outdoor	RRF	41 m	31.447083°S 60.920651°W
Argentina		Concepción del Uruguay	540 m	unknown	asphalt	Outdoor		9 m	32.473652°S 58.224562°W
Argentina		Concordia	340 m	unknown	concrete	Outdoor		35 m	31.372278°S 58.001488°W
Argentina	Eduardo Maero (Bº Ayacucho) Velodrome	Córdoba	250 m	unknown	concrete	Outdoor	painted	430 m	31.375739°S 64.174219°W
Argentina	Ernesto Contreras Provincial	Mendoza	333.33 m	unknown	concrete	Outdoor	RRF	859 m	32.884205°S 68.880290°W
Argentina	Gabriel Deramond Municipal cycletrack	Caleta Olivia	450 m	unknown	asphalt	Outdoor		7 m	46.450051°S 67.529755°W
Argentina	Héctor Cassina	Rafaela	250 m	unknown	concrete	Outdoor	lights	103 m	31.272154°S 61.493785°W
Argentina	Jorge Batiz	Corral de Bustos	225 m	unknown	concrete	Outdoor		118 m	33.275939°S 62.192824°W
Argentina	Julio Polet Panamerican	Mar del Plata	250 m	unknown	concrete	Outdoor	lights, UP	16 m	38.016792°S 57.575439°W
Argentina	KDT Circuit	Buenos Aires	333.33 m	unknown	concrete	Outdoor	painted, RRF	9 m	34.566094°S 58.415181°W
Argentina	Las Breñas Cycle Association	Las Breñas	400 m	unknown	concrete	Outdoor	lights	105 m	27.096371°S 61.074074°W
Argentina	Luján	José María Jáuregui	200 m	unknown	concrete	Outdoor	lights	27 m	34.594188°S 59.181770°W
Argentina	Mayo Park	San Juan	400 m	unknown	concrete	Outdoor	lights, RRF	656 m	31.531321°S 68.543792°W
Argentina	Reconquista Municipal	Reconquista	333.33 m	unknown	concrete	Outdoor		44 m	29.166628°S 59.639164°W
Argentina	Resistencia	Resistencia	400 m	unknown	concrete	Outdoor		53 m	27.435003°S 59.036791°W
Argentina	Río Cuarto Municipal	Río Cuarto	250 m	unknown	concrete	Outdoor		440 m	33.113971°S 64.349065°W
Argentina	Roberto "Paco" Echegaray	San Carlos de Bariloche	333.33 m	unknown	concrete	Outdoor	lights	823 m	41.136363°S 71.292591°W
Argentina	Rubén Rosetti	Junín	333.33 m	unknown	concrete	Outdoor		82 m	34.585758°S 60.974359°W
Argentina	Rufino	Rufino	333.33 m	unknown	concrete	Outdoor		121 m	34.258369°S 62.724729°W
Argentina	Sáenz Peña	Pres. Roque Sáenz Peña	333.33 m	unknown	concrete	Outdoor		93 m	26.814527°S 60.422674°W
Argentina	San Francisco	San Francisco	400 m	unknown	concrete	Outdoor	non-std, painted	118 m	31.416487°S 62.079451°W
Argentina	San Luis Provincial	San Luis	250 m	unknown	concrete	Outdoor	lights, UP	729 m	33.312613°S 66.328478°W
Argentina	San Nicolás cycletrack	San Nicolás de los Arroyos	500 m	unknown	asphalt	Outdoor		28 m	33.353730°S 60.214062°W
Argentina	Trenque Lauquen Cycletrack	Trenque Lauquen	575 m	unknown	concrete	Outdoor	100 m turns	93 m	35.986721°S 62.750528°W
Argentina	Tres de Febrero	Villa Martínez de Hoz	535 m	unknown	concrete	Outdoor	lights, 40 m turns	93 m	34.603913°S 58.577175°W
Argentina	Unzué Park Municipal	Gualeguaychú	425 m	unknown	asphalt	Outdoor	lights, 75 m turns	7 m	33.010067°S 58.497099°W
Argentina	Velodrome of the Lagoon	Santa Rosa	565 m	unknown	asphalt	Outdoor	lights, RRF	169 m	36.628123°S 64.310869°W
Argentina	Venado Tuerto Municipal	Venado Tuerto	333.33 m	unknown	asphalt	Outdoor	lights	123 m	33.737229°S 61.961060°W
Argentina	Velódromo Héroes de Malvinas	San Juan	250 m	unknown	asphalt	Outdoor	lights, UP, RRF	646 m	31.581208°S 68.549754°W
Argentina	Vicente Alejo Chancay	San Juan	257 m	47°/12°	wood	Indoor	Will be venue for 2025 UCI Track Cycling World Championships	650 m	31.613653°S 68.528698°W
Armenia	Yerevan Velodrome	Yerevan	250 m	42°	wood	Outdoor	Built in 2010–11 to replace the old cycling track which was later demolished.	915 m	40.15684227407168°N 44.462862528439615°E
Australia	Adcock Park Velodrome	West Gosford, New South Wales	460 m	unknown	asphalt	Outdoor	Open to the public excepting cycle club competitions and training. Surrounds athletics track so caution when events are on. Lights.	4 m	33.430872°N 151.327892°E
Australia	Adelaide Super-Drome	Gepps Cross, South Australia	250 m	43.0°	wood	Indoor	Hosted 2011 Oceania Track Championships	25 m	34.841384°S 138.612296°E
Australia	Anna Meares Velodrome	Chandler, Queensland	250 m	40.0°	wood	Indoor	Hosted 2018 Commonwealth Games; Will be venue for 2032 Summer Olympics		27.514972°S 153.146506°E
Australia	Marty Busch	Ballarat, Victoria	250 m	37.5°	concrete	Outdoor		421 m	37.604869°S 143.843474°E
Australia	Burwood East	Burwood East, Victoria	307 m	25°	concrete	Outdoor		134 m	37.855967°S 145.160255°E
Australia	Blackwater	Blackwater, Queensland	333.33 m	unknown	concrete	Outdoor		169 m	23.563408°S 148.884876°E
Australia	Blue Lake Sports Park	Mount Gambier, South Australia	250 m	unknown	concrete	Outdoor		40 m	37.843460°S 140.816547°E
Australia	Bob Whitford	Newborough, Victoria	500 m	unknown	asphalt	Outdoor		83 m	38.177966°S 146.295445°E
Australia	Brunswick	Brunswick East, Victoria	322 m	unknown	concrete	Outdoor	lights	39 m	37.761090°S 144.981417°E
Australia	Bundaberg	Bundaberg West, Queensland	400 m	unknown	asphalt	Outdoor	lights	16 m	24.873638°S 152.338025°E
Australia	Caboolture Sports Centre	Caboolture, Queensland	350 m	unknown	concrete	Outdoor	lights	8 m	27.088876°S 152.945461°E
Australia	Cairns Cycledome Smith Park	Cairns, Queensland	400 m	unknown	bitumen	Outdoor	lights		-16.92503771975386, 145.73925140221513
Australia	Chandler Velodrome	Brisbane, Queensland	333.33 m	31	concrete	Outdoor	lights, underpass	34 m	27.511004°S 153.147569°E
Australia	Chelsea	Edithvale, Victoria	502 m	unknown	concrete	Outdoor	painted	5 m	38.036176°S 145.120214°E
Australia	Coburg	Coburg, Victoria	250 m	unknown	concrete	Outdoor	underpass	72 m	37.729756°S 144.955411°E
Australia	Collie	Collie, Western Australia	333.33 m	unknown	concrete	Outdoor		187 m	33.355330°S 116.155149°E
Australia	Dalgety Road	Alice Springs, Northern Territory	333.33 m	unknown	concrete	Outdoor	lights, underpass	600 m	23.669988°S 133.864115°E
Australia	Bagot Park	Darwin, Northern Territory	325 m	unknown	concrete	Outdoor	lights	22 m	12.396234°S 130.859035°E
Australia	David Blackie	Ararat, Victoria	250 m	unknown	concrete	Outdoor	lights	309 m	37.270687°S 142.941535°E
Australia	Devonport Oval	Devonport, Tasmania	500 m	unknown	concrete	Outdoor	lights	9 m	41.166921°S 146.359195°E
Australia	Doug Powell	Castlemaine, Victoria	500 m	unknown	asphalt	Outdoor		297 m	37.072664°S 144.230781°E
Australia	Dunc Gray Velodrome	Sydney, New South Wales	250 m	42°/12.5°	wood	Indoor	Hosted 2000 Summer Olympics	52 m	33.907419°S 150.998744°E
Australia	Lidcombe Oval	Sydney, New South Wales	426 m	unknown	asphalt	outdoor	lights	11 m	33.856667°S 151.04°E
Australia	Echuca-Moama	Moama, New South Wales	295 m	unknown	concrete	Outdoor		99 m	36.101540°S 144.746994°E
Australia	Edwardstown	South Plympton, South Australia	480 m	unknown	asphalt	Outdoor		22 m	34.981434°S 138.564294°E
Australia	Eridge Park	Burradoo, New South Wales	333.33 m	unknown	asphalt	Outdoor	painted, lights	662 m	34.515607°S 150.406955°E
Australia	Exeter cycletrack	Exeter, Tasmania	365 m	unknown	asphalt	Outdoor		56 m	41.298051°S 146.949112°E
Australia	Geelong West Velodrome	Geelong West, Victoria	454m	unknown	asphalt	Outdoor			38.130124°S 144.345949°E
Australia	Georgetown	Georgetown, Tasmania	375 m	unknown	asphalt	Outdoor		23 m	41.098970°S 146.834478°E
Australia	Gold Coast Cycling Centre	Nerang, Queensland	356 m	unknown	asphalt	Outdoor	lights	6 m	27.985710°S 153.336197°E
Australia	Graeme Jose	Whyalla, South Australia	269 m	unknown	concrete	Outdoor	lights	35 m	33.024118°S 137.570420°E
Australia	H.A. Smith Reserve	Hawthorn, Victoria	250 m	unknown	asphalt	Outdoor		16 m	37.838337°S 145.039090°E
Australia	Hanson Reserve	Woodville Gardens, South Australia	405 m	unknown	asphalt	Outdoor		12 m	34.867490°S 138.552196°E
Australia	Melbourne Arena	Melbourne, Victoria	250 m		wood	Indoor	Built in 2000. Hosted 2004 and 2012 UCI Track Cycling World Championships and 2006 Commonwealth Games	12 m	-37.822777097808626, 144.98184163187037
Australia	Hurstville Velodrome	Sydney				Outdoor		78 m	-33.96135885174499, 151.09946920127248
Australia	Joe Ciavola Velodrome (Darebin International Sports Centre)	Thornbury, Victoria	250 m	42°	wood	Indoor		52 m	37.764412°S 145.022930°E
Australia	Kenrick Tucker Velodrome	Rockhampton, Queensland	333.33 m			Outdoor			-23.34956317820862, 150.5334125433557
Australia	Kyneton Velodrome	Hurry Reserve Kyneton, Victoria	250 m	unknown	concrete	Outdoor		510 m	37.838337°S 145.039090°E
Australia	Latrobe Recreation Ground	Latrobe, Tasmania				Outdoor			-41.23583035885417, 146.42132589392952
Australia	Lavington Sports Ground	Albury, New South Wales	250 m		concrete	Outdoor			-36.03631545881526, 146.9133365253609
Australia	Lidcombe Oval	Lidcombe, New South Wales	426 m		asphalt	Outdoor	lights. Resurfaced and corners softened Dec 2013		-33.85668271439197, 151.03995733235914
Australia	Maryborough Velodrome	Avoca Road, Maryborough, Victoria	333.33 m	unknown	concrete	Outdoor		250 m	37.049469°S 143.725607°E
Australia	Muswellbrook Velodrome	Muswellbrook, New South Wales	166.66 m		concrete	Outdoor		150 m	32.26952°S 150.89225°E
Australia	Narrabundah Capital Velodrome	Canberra, Australian Capital Territory	333.33 m		concrete	Outdoor			-35.33773783685572, 149.15912320332689
Australia	New Town Oval	Hobart, Tasmania				Outdoor			-42.85305860536249, 147.29816930907123
Australia	Packer Park	Glen Eira, Carnegie	335 m	unknown	concrete	Outdoor		50 m	37.901469°S 145.057952°E
Australia	Perth SpeedDome	Midvale, Western Australia	250 m		wood	Indoor	Hosted 1997 UCI Track Cycling World Championships		-31.878933645703864, 116.026407768685
Australia	Prince of Wales	Tamworth, New South Wales	250 m	unknown	concrete	Outdoor	lights, underpass	384 m	31.097542°S 150.935333°E
Australia	Rosebery Oval	Rosebery, Tasmania				Outdoor			-41.779790189339536, 145.53310441583758
Australia	Sale Velodrome	Sale, Victoria			concrete	Outdoor			38.107042°S 147.092119°E
Australia	Seiffert Oval	Goulburn, New South Wales	400 m	unknown	asphalt	Outdoor	painted, lights		34.751539°S 149.710369°E
Australia	Shepparton Velodrome	Shepparton, Victoria	333.33 m		concrete	Outdoor			36.354928°S 145.392816°E
Australia	Silverdome	Launceston, Tasmania	285.714 m		wood	Indoor	The first Southern Hemisphere's Indoor timber cycling velodrome.		-41.47536274858873, 147.14024664197458
Australia	St. Helens Velodrome	St Helens, Tasmania				Outdoor			-41.31798219185631, 148.23438946130395
Australia	Canterbury Tempe Velodrome	Earlwood, New South Wales	333.33 m		concrete	Outdoor	Official name is Canterbury Velodrome, though most call it Tempe Velodrome.	5 m	33.9253437°S 151.1539239°E
Australia	Tom Flood Sports Centre Velodrome	Bendigo, Victoria	412 m			Outdoor		225 m	36.752596°S 144.280897°E
Australia	Toormina Velodrome	near Coffs Harbour, New South Wales	330 m		asphalt	Outdoor	Built in 2005		-30.35647557518777, 153.09489011892381
Australia	TW Andrews Park Velodrome	Preston, Victoria	333.33 m			Outdoor		85 m	37.716366°S 145.016937°E
Australia	Unanderra Velodrome	Unanderra, New South Wales	270 m		concrete	Outdoor			-34.45823818365211, 150.84039902965893
Australia	Wagga Cricket Ground	Wagga Wagga, New South Wales			concrete	Outdoor			-35.10550496820729, 147.3602940293979
Australia	Wangaratta Velodrome	Wangaratta, Victoria	490 m			Outdoor		145 m	36.346972°S 146.317122°E
Australia	Warragul Velodrome	Warragul, Victoria	333.33 m		concrete	Outdoor		140 m	38.169958°S 145.942734°E
Australia	Warwick Velodrome	Warwick, Queensland	333.33 m		bitumen	Outdoor	Lights on until 10pm	470 m	28.22694197463552°N 152.0198063094411°E
Australia	West Park Oval	Burnie, Tasmania				Outdoor			-41.045885822269696, 145.8983330634021
Austria	hello yellow Velodrome Linz	Linz	200 m	45°	wood	Outdoor	https://www.hello-yellow.at/en/	298 m	48.302830801327794°N 14.323129220329283°E
Barbados	Bridgetown	Bush Hall	500 m	unknown	concrete	Outdoor		46 m	13.120344°N 59.604657°W
Belarus	Minsk-Arena	Minsk	250 m		wood	Indoor	Hosted 2013 UCI Track Cycling World Championships		53.935522382754186, 27.48467082985403
Belgium	Velodroom Limburg	Heusden-Zolder	250 m		wood	Indoor	Hosted 2025 UEC European Track Championships		50.99315704847264, 5.265288951426002
Belgium	Vlaams Wielercentrum Eddy Merckx	Blaarmeersen, Ghent	250 m		wood	Indoor	Hosted 2019 UEC European Track Championships (under-23 & junior)		51.04679773652839, 3.692563847300104
Belgium	Kuipke	Ghent	166.66 m		wood	Indoor	Hosted annually the Six Days of Ghent		51.038625079207016, 3.720881059498416
Belgium	Antwerps Sportpaleis	Antwerp	250 m		wood	Indoor	Hosted 1969 and 2001 UCI Track Cycling World Championships		51.2311597899336, 4.441401846012163
Belgium	Wielerpiste Hulshout	Hulshout	384 m		asphalt	Outdoor			51.08385554150323, 4.8012838447117785
Belgium	Alleur	Ans	400 m		asphalt	Outdoor			50.683117310566445, 5.513013355922614
Belgium	Peer	Peer	400 m		asphalt	Outdoor			51.13453093973343, 5.464113981302574
Belgium	Vélodrome de Charleroi-Gilly	Gilly, Charleroi	250 m		asphalt	Outdoor			50.428330259066946, 4.479133884060329
Belgium	Jemelle	Rochefort	400 m		asphalt	Outdoor			50.15737187922954, 5.240531603184665
Belgium	Quenast	Rebecq	333.33 m		asphalt	Outdoor			50.66188177437747, 4.170342457082053
Belgium	Defraeye-Sercu	Rumbeke	166.67 m		concrete	Outdoor			50.93095522402432, 3.160157855797289
Belgium	Stene	Ostend	333.33 m		asphalt	Outdoor			51.19925363473235, 2.9258931981363636
Belgium	Wielercentrum Antwerpen	Wilrijk, Antwerp	333.33 m		asphalt	Outdoor	Construction began 24 September 2005, opened 30 September 2006		51.16204399927444, 4.373807129649544
Belgium	Wielerbaan Patrick Sercu	Bruges	333.33 m		asphalt	Outdoor			51.20588291867413, 3.244201551556865
Belgium	Beveren	Beveren	400 m		asphalt				51.21365610442611, 4.237210217359525
Bolivia	Velodromo de Alto Irpavi	La Paz	333.33 m	unknown	concrete	Outdoor	underpass. Built for the 1977 Juegos Bolivarianos.	3340 m	16.5235°S 68.0820°W
Bolivia	Villa Suramericana La Tamborada	Cochabamba	250 m		wood	Indoor	Built by Deportan/Petrarq / Hosted 2018 South American Games	2600 m	-17.459884393810906, -66.13620610608129
Bolivia	Velodromo Edgar Cueto	Cochabamba	333.33 m	unknown	concrete	Outdoor	Painted, Underpass. Inside Parque Mariscal Santa Cruz. Never really inaugurated. Named after the Cochabamba cycling champ from Quillacollo.	2571 m	17.3995°S 66.1735°W
Bolivia	Tarija	Tarija	250 m		concrete	Outdoor	Inauguration 27.2.2018. Built from 2008. Inside park Oscar Zamora.	˜1500 m	-21.563633946453706, -64.72327327201918
Bolivia	Santa Cruz	Santa Cruz	250 m		concrete	Outdoor	Inside the Villa Deportiva Abrahm Telchi. Inaugurated 10.4.2014.	˜800 m	-17.828201359826757, -63.188448514364296
Bolivia	Oruro	Oruro	490 m	around 10%	asphalt	Outdoor		˜4000 m	-17.978250532889945, -67.0931535744799
Bolivia	Velódromo Municipal Sucre	Chuquisaca	250 m		concrete	Outdoor	Built for the Juegos Deportivos de la Juventud 2020.	2780 m	
Brazil	Ciclismo E	Americana, São Paulo	333.33 m	unknown	concrete	Outdoor	lights	538 m	22.745205°S 47.320752°W
Brazil	Centro de Esporte e Lazer (Jardim Botânico)	Curitiba, Paraná	333.33 m	unknown	concrete	Outdoor	lights, underpass, tennis infield	928 m	25.443346°S 49.240742°W
Brazil	Willie Davids	Maringá, Paraná	250 m	unknown	concrete	Outdoor	lights, underpass	551 m	23.411737°S 51.937014°W
Brazil	Rio Olympic Velodrome	Rio de Janeiro	250 m	44.9º	wood	Indoor	Hosted 2016 Summer Olympics	5 m	22.980237°S 43.394769°W
Brazil	Velódromo Municipal Joaraci Mariano de Barros	Indaiatuba, São Paulo	250 m	43°	concrete	Outdoor			-23.097805185449655, -47.22737036829393
Brazil	Velódromo de Caieiras	Caieiras	250 m	unknown	concrete	Outdoor	underpass, traffic safety infield	735 m	23.356376°S 46.741582°W
Bulgaria	Kolodruma	Plovdiv	250 m	45°/10°	wood	Indoor	Opened 2015. Hosted 2020 UEC European Track Championships.	164 m	42.1282888°N 24.7667278°E
Canada	Argyll Velodrome	Edmonton, Alberta	333.33 m	37˚	concrete	Outdoor	Built for the 1978 Commonwealth Games. Also hosted track cycling competitions at the 1983 Summer Universiade.		53.50712173778563, -113.46296165704425
Canada	Vélodrome Sylvan Adams	Bromont, Quebec	250 m	42˚/10˚	wood	Indoor	New covered velodrome opened in 2022, replacing the outdoor Bromont Velodrome.		45.32371043591583, -72.6423696708375
Canada	Burnaby Velodrome	Burnaby, British Columbia (near Vancouver)	200 m	47˚	wood	Indoor	built mid-1990s. Pressurised dome.	30 m	49.288891380880436, -122.94065686145424
Canada	Coronation Park Sports and Recreation Centre	Edmonton, Alberta	250 m	42˚	wood	Indoor	first indoor triathlon training centre in North America		53.560980847895074, -113.56065715294338
Canada	Forest City Velodrome	London, Ontario	138 m	50˚	wood	Indoor	world's shortest permanent velodrome, built 2005 inside former hockey arena		42.918878531196974, -81.20476111195252
Canada	Glenmore Velodrome	Calgary, Alberta	400 m	39˚	concrete	Outdoor			51.00563134091761, -114.10322099262817
Canada	Mattamy National Cycling Centre	Milton, Ontario	250 m	42˚	wood	Indoor	built for the 2015 Pan American Games. First-ever UCI-regulated, class 1 Indoor velodrome in Canada. Designed by FaulknerBrowns Architects and opened in January 2015.		43.47435744245925, -79.87671539234131
Canada	Westshore Velodrome (Formerly Juan de Fuca Velodrome)	Colwood, Victoria, British Columbia	333.33 m	28˚	concrete	Outdoor	Built for the 1994 Commonwealth Games		48.44361172327907, -123.4645234020603
Canada	Wind-Del Velodrome	Windham Centre, Ontario	250 m	13˚	asphalt	Outdoor			42.910176021219456, -80.42017319534163
Chile	Estadio La Granja	Curico	250 m	unknown	concrete	Outdoor	lights, RR entry	221 m	34.974407°S 71.229354°W
Chile	Punta Arenas	Punta Arenas	500 m	unknown	concrete	Outdoor		7 m	53.154142°S 70.895553°W
Chile	Estadio Nacional	Santiago	333.33 m	unknown	concrete	Outdoor	lights, RR entry, underpass	570 m	33.469166°S 70.607444°W
Chile	Velódromo Peñalolén	Santiago	250 m	unknown	wood	Indoor	laminated wood (Finland Master Plank Kerto), designed by Peter Junek: built for the 2014 South American Games		33.465816°S 70.545315°W
China	Guangzhou Velodrome	Guangzhou	250 m		wood	Indoor	built for the 2010 Asian Games		23.05335862772348, 113.39171083354483
China	Laoshan Velodrome	Beijing	250 m		wood	Indoor	built for the 2008 Summer Olympics		39.91280397334726, 116.20758100812654
China	Luoyang Velodrome	Luoyang City	250m		wood	indoor			
China	Tianjin Velodrome	Tianjin	250 m		wood	Indoor	built for the 2013 East Asian Games		39.07059444637339, 117.17146181934214
China	Liaoning Velodrome	Shenyang	250 m		wood	Indoor			
China	Shanghai Velodrome	Shanghai	250 m		wood	Indoor	UCI WCC Continental Development Satellite		
China	Shandong Velodrome	Jinan	250 m		wood	Indoor			
China	Shanxi Velodrome	Taiyuan	250 m		wood	Indoor			
Colombia	Velódromo Rafael Vásquez	Barranquilla				Outdoor			10.924228910691399, -74.80096863168234
Colombia	Velódromo Luís Carlos Galán	Bogotá	333.33 m		concrete	Outdoor	Hosted 1995 UCI Track Cycling World Championships		4.66520384898806, -74.09808934521685
Colombia	Velódromo Primero de Mayo	Bogotá	333.33 m	43°/11°	wood	Outdoor	Built in 1951.		4.572961550857375, -74.08908986795345
Colombia	Velódromo Alfonso Flórez Ortiz	Bucaramanga			concrete	Outdoor			7.13508481511304, -73.11565886054663
Colombia	Velódromo Alcides Nieto Patiño	Cali	250 m	46°/11°	wood	Outdoor, fully covered	Built in 1971. Renovated in 2007. Regular stop for the UCI Track Cycling World Cup Classics. Hosted 2014 UCI Track Cycling World Championships	998 m	3.4113682179685583, -76.55098624706972
Colombia	Velódromo Alfonso Salamanca	Duitama	250 m		concrete	Outdoor			5.80423973680268, -73.03665931312615
Colombia	Velódromo Martín Emilio Cochise Rodriguez	Medellín	250 m	45°/8.5°	concrete	Outdoor			6.257119918344478, -75.5942669219195
Colombia	Velódromo Alfonso Hurtado Sarria	Pereira				Outdoor			4.804605848357146, -75.75419312192632
Costa Rica	Parque de la Paz	San Jose	333.33 m	30°/12°	concrete	Outdoor	lights	1173 m	9.912559°N 84.072993°W
Croatia	Stadion Kranjčevićeva	Zagreb	430 m	unknown	concrete	Outdoor	demolished on 28.04.2025.	116 m	45.804623°N 15.960862°E
Cuba	Velodromo Reinaldo Paseiro	Havana	333.33 m	unknown	concrete	Outdoor	underpass	40 m	23.153913°N 82.315042°W
Czech Republic		Motol, Prague	153.8 m	unknown	wood	Indoor		279 m	50.065716°N 14.351952°E
Czech Republic	Velodrom Třebešín	Třebešín, Prague	333.33 m	35°/7.5°	concrete	Outdoor	overpass	271 m	50.08419°N 14.488333°E
Czech Republic	Velodrom TJ Favorit Brno	Brno	400 m	34°/7°	concrete	Outdoor, track covered	lights, underpass. The first race here was on 21 July 1889. Hosted 1969 and 1981 world championships	208 m	49.184660°N 16.579075°E
Czech Republic		Prostějov	301 m	unknown	concrete	Outdoor	lights	227 m	49.480468°N 17.101522°E
Czech Republic		Plzeň	400 m	unknown	concrete	Outdoor	lights	332 m	49.736767°N 13.401070°E
Czech Republic		Louny	446 m	unknown	concrete	Outdoor		180 m	50.367180°N 13.788241°E
Denmark	Aarhus Cyklebane	Aarhus	333.33 m	36°	concrete	Outdoor		20 m	56.132485°N 10.191437°E
Denmark	Ballerup Super Arena	Copenhagen	250 m	45°	wood	Indoor	Hosted 2002, 2010 UCI Track Cycling World Championships and annually the Six Days of Copenhagen	24 m	55.721157°N 12.368401°E
Denmark	Hobro Cykelbane/Rosendal Idrætsforum	Hobro	250 m	30°	concrete	Outdoor		45 m	56.65507028764894°N 9.76651179942302°E
Denmark	Thorvald Ellegaard Arena	Odense	250 m	42°	wood	Indoor		20 m	55.399473°N 10.346406°E
Dominican Republic	Juan Pablo Duarte Olympic Center	Naco	333.33 m	unknown	concrete	Outdoor	lights, underpass, stadium		18.477497°N 69.919199°W
Ecuador	José Luis Recalde Velodrome	Quito	333.33 m	unknown	concrete	Outdoor	lights, stadium	2797 m	0.213648°S 78.486987°W
Egypt	Cairo Velodrome	Cairo	250 m		wood	Outdoor, fully covered	Hosted 2021 UCI Junior Track Cycling World Championships		30.072362397048025°N 31.30894342368037°E
Estonia	Pirita Velodrome	Tallinn	333.33 m	34°	concrete	Outdoor	underpass, multi-use infield, lights, stadium	12 m	59.463234°N 24.831527°E
Finland	Helsinki Velodrome	Helsinki	400 m	37.5˚/16˚	concrete	Outdoor		11 m	60.202837°N 24.943042°E
Finland	Turku Velodrome	Turku	333.33 m	unknown	asphalt	Outdoor		18 m	60.444272°N 22.302112°E
France	Palais des Sports	Grenoble	210.52 m	37°	wood	Indoor			45.18543149654686, 5.740429282227151
France	Vélodrome de Vincennes	Bois de Vincennes, Paris	500 m			Outdoor	built 1894. Tour de France finish from 1968 to 1974		48.82637636109472, 2.4111225120957545
France	Vélodrome du Lac	Bordeaux	250 m		wood	Indoor	Hosted 1998 and 2006 UCI Track Cycling World Championship		44.899099667692575, -0.5661438824969978
France	Vélodrome Roubaix (Vélodrome André-Pétrieux)	Roubaix	499.75 m	31°	concrete	Outdoor	Site of the finish of the spring classic Paris–Roubaix		50.67811492299893, 3.2053132232552546
France	Vélodrome Stablinski	Roubaix	250 m	45°	wood	Indoor	Built in 2012		50.67986213328622, 3.2048196968219735
France	Vélodrome du Parc de la Tête d'Or	Lyon	333.33 m	43°	resin	Outdoor			45.78195598793878, 4.855773077052908
France	INSEP	Paris	166.66 m		wood	Indoor			48.83148430580596, 2.450744813752726
France	Vélodrome Raymond Poulidor	Bonnac-la-Côte	250 m		concrete	Indoor		410 m	45.94581°N 1.28162°E
France	Vélodrome National de Saint-Quentin-en-Yvelines	Paris	250 m	43.8°	wood	Indoor	Hosted 2015 UCI Track Cycling World Championships, 2016 UEC European Track Championships and 2024 Summer Olympics		48.78790382340482, 2.034904653869663
France	Vélodrome de Toulon-Provence-Méditerranée	Hyères, Var	250 m		wood	Outdoor, track covered			43.10021510105627, 6.1245934518237775
France	Vélodrome Municipal de Dijon	Dijon, Côte d'Or	250 m	45°	resin	Outdoor			47.32623782345656, 5.067808584545069
France	Vélodrome Jean Jaurès	Equeurdreville, Manche	400 m		concrete	Outdoor			49.648596964731404, -1.6547977080206708
France	Vélodrome Commandant Bouguin	Rennes	403 m			Outdoor			48.107940456197625, -1.6623481847868056
France	Vélodrome Amédée Détraux	Baie-Mahault, Guadeloupe	333.33 m		concrete	Outdoor	Hosted 2014 UEC European Track Championships		16.249184783420883, -61.59409994696397
France	Vélodrome de Saint-Denis-de-l'Hôtel	Saint-Denis-de-l'Hôtel	333.33 m		concrete	Outdoor	built 1985		47.873165094866934, 2.1461776765728287
France	Vélodrome Gabriel Chéfiare	Saint-Denis, Reunion	333.33 m		concrete	Outdoor			-20.8923777026713, 55.4722572390602
France	Vélodrome de Fautaua	Papeete, Tahiti	400 m		concrete	Outdoor			-17.533871692375005, -149.55181269112882
Germany	Andreasried Velodrome	Erfurt	250 m		concrete	Outdoor, track covered	Originally opened in 1885. Redeveloped in 2006–2007, converting the original 333.33 metre track to a 250-metre track and adding a roof.		51.00158050147485, 11.010402625669544
Germany	Badewanne	Dudenhofen	250 m	42°	concrete	Outdoor			49.3216630456134°N 8.38893465847812°E
Germany	Radrennbahn	Bielefeld	333.33 m	49°	concrete	Outdoor			52.03062554061738, 8.580284557321153
Germany	Chemnitz Sportforum Velodrome	Chemnitz	318 m		concrete	Outdoor			50.803308713566956, 12.92993214408874
Germany	Lausitz Velodrom Cottbus	Cottbus	333.33 m		concrete	Outdoor, track covered			51.74071428487285, 14.33704245048803
Germany	Eichwaldstadion Velodrome	Schopp	450 m		concrete	Outdoor			49.35788228394303, 7.697508343352901
Germany	Radstadion Öschelbronn	Gäufelden	200 m	42°	wood	Outdoor, fully covered			48.54703456112759, 8.81265969249278
Germany	Gera Velodrome	Gera	250 m		concrete	Outdoor			50.86435646173404, 12.065600708473857
Germany	Isar-Radstadion	Niederpöring	333.33 m		concrete	Outdoor			48.71552295017934, 12.844948961261228
Germany	Mannheim Velodrome	Mannheim	333.33 m		concrete	Outdoor			49.50704842019665°N 8.48613150257496°E
Germany	NRW-Leistungszentrum	Kaarst-Büttgen	250 m		wood	Indoor			51.20281558484775, 6.6059188273306075
Germany	Oberhausen	Oberhausen-Rheinhausen	333 m	28°	concrete	Outdoor			49.25143542560403°N 8.47807831012781°E
Germany	Oderlandhalle	Frankfurt (Oder)	250 m		wood	Indoor	Redeveloped in 2013–2014, converting the original 285,714 metre track to a 250-metre track.		52.35648822515943, 14.52691404845705
Germany	Albert Richter Bahn	Köln	250 m	43°	wood	Outdoor, track covered			50.93622128250217, 6.8720681674424196
Germany	Rosch-Kampfbahn	Leipzig	400 m		concrete	Outdoor, track covered			51.31147151618856, 12.327740861529001
Germany	Rostock Velodrome	Rostock	250 m		concrete	Outdoor			54.07039867554192, 12.096116550371947
Germany	RSG	Augsburg	200 m		wood	Indoor			48.382129741440615, 10.945847665499887
Germany	Solingen Velodrome	Solingen	384.62 m		concrete	Outdoor			51.15133992110268, 7.127036015489781
Germany	Stadthalle	Bremen	166.66 m		wood	Indoor			53.086972561013276, 8.816696763827139
Germany	Stellingen	Hamburg	250 m		concrete	Outdoor, fully covered			53.59028955454266, 9.943551052201693
Germany	VCD	Darmstadt	333.33 m		concrete	Outdoor			49.85012729642077, 8.647348691986751
Germany	Velodrom	Berlin	250 m		wood	Indoor	Hosted 1999 UCI Track Cycling World Championships, the 2017 UEC European Track Championships and annually the Six Days of Berlin		52.530675077944416, 13.451053025173888
Greece	Athens Olympic Velodrome	Kifisia, Athens	250 m	42˚	wood	Indoor	Originally built in 1991, for the Mediterranean Games. Refurbished and covered in order to host the 2004 Summer Olympics. Redesigned for the 2004 Olympics by Santiago Calatrava.	162 m	38.040134°N 23.780321°E
Greece	Diagoras Velodrome	Rodos	412 m	unknown	concrete	Outdoor	lights	16 m	36.438224°N 28.228184°E
Guatemala	Velodromo Nacional de Guatemala	Guatemala City	250 m		concrete	Outdoor	Only track. If stairs are needed built outside.	˜50 m	14.595296003275191, -90.53228694513662
Hong Kong	Hong Kong Velodrome	Tseung Kwan O New Town	250 m	41.9°	wood	Indoor	Built in 2013. Hosted 2017 UCI Track Cycling World Championships; 2024 UCI Track Cycling Nations Cup		22.31331°N 114.26232°E
Hong Kong	Whitehead Velodrome	Ma On Shan		unknown	concrete	Outdoor			22.435782°N 114.240151°E
Hungary	Millenáris Sporttelep	Budapest	412 m	unknown	concrete	Outdoor	lights, underpass (2)	113 m	47.506193°N 19.094761°E
Hungary	Tamási Track	Tamási	400 m	unknown	concrete	Outdoor		107 m	46.626084°N 18.291624°E
India	B R Ambedkar Velodrome	B R Ambedkar Sports Complex, Vijaypura	333 m		concrete	Outdoor			
India	Commonwealth Games Velodrome	Indira Gandhi Sports Complex, New Delhi	250 m		wood	Indoor			28.634039114736133, 77.25108542672716
India	Guru Nanak Dev University Cycling Velodrome	Amritsar	333.33 m		concrete	Outdoor			31.63736734290269, 74.82920083244917
India	NIS Velodrome	Patiala	333.33 m		concrete	Outdoor			30.306133525398398, 76.38608882474516
India	Osmania University Velodrome	Hyderabad	333.33 m		concrete	Outdoor			17.418131510382008, 78.52109493752289
India	Punjabi University Stadium	Patiala	500 m		concrete	Outdoor			30.364478962788958, 76.45144513299734
India	Veerangna Rani Durgawati Sports Complex	Jabalpur				Outdoor			23.17350916886205, 79.92078643155305
India	Shree Shiv Chhatrapati Sports Complex velodrome	Pune	333.33 m		concrete	Outdoor			18.577635267941556, 73.75997621264548
India	Swai Maan Singh Sports Complex Cycling Velodrome	Jaipur	333.33 m		concrete	Outdoor			26.893736241445673, 75.80652168998537
India	LNCPE SAI Cycling Velodrome	Trivendrium	333.33 m		concrete	Outdoor			8.573732939545152, 76.88973249713392
India	SAI Sports Complex Cycling Velodrome	Imphal, Manipur	333.33 m		concrete	Outdoor			
India	National Games Sports Complex Cycling Velodrome	Ranchi	333.33 m		concrete	Outdoor			23.37834666942736, 85.39283753794675
India	National Games Sports Complex Cycling Velodrome	Guwahati, Assam	333.33 m		concrete	Outdoor			
India	PAU Sports Complex Cycling Velodrome	Ludhiana, Punjab	333.33 m		concrete	Outdoor			30.898995392894665, 75.81611444500426
India	Maharaja Karni Singh Stadium	Bikaner, Rajasthan	300 m		concrete	Outdoor			28.028479267761433, 73.32639626880409
Indonesia	Jakarta International Velodrome	Rawamangun, Jakarta	250 m	unknown	wood	Indoor	Built in 2018 in order to host the 2018 Asian Games.	5,5 m	6.191085°S 106.890227°E
Indonesia	Munaip Saleh Memorial Velodrome	Cisangkan, Bandung	333.33 m	unknown	concrete	Outdoor		749 m	6.873614°S 107.529339°E
Indonesia	Manahan Velodrome	Manahan, Banjarsari, Surakarta		unknown	concrete	Outdoor			-7.554741548742964, 110.8042453824442
Indonesia	Sawojajar Velodrome	Sawojajar, Kedungkandang, Malang		unknown	concrete	Outdoor			-7.97304973675642, 112.66986888797285
Iran		Ahvaz	250 m		concrete	Outdoor, track covered			38.029643°N 46.292755°E
Iran	Azadi Velodrome	Tehran	333.33 m	unknown	concrete	Outdoor	overpass, underpass, stadium, lights	1285 m	35.722432°N 51.272563°E
Iran	Samen	Mashhad	250 m		concrete	Outdoor, track covered		1050 m	36.290131°N 59.596831°E
Iran	Tabriz Cycling Track	Mashhad	250 m		concrete	Outdoor, track covered			38.029643°N 46.292755°E
Ireland	Eamonn Ceannt Stadium (Sundrive Road Track)	Dublin	457.5 m	7°–8° on the straight 15°–17° at the bends	tarmac	Outdoor	resurfaced 2009	35 m	53.3247°N 6.2920°W
Ireland	Kanturk Velodrome	Kanturk	250 m	Shallow	tarmac	Outdoor		78 m	52.1653°N 8.8992°W
Israel	Sylvan Adams Velodrome	Tel Aviv	250 m		wood	Outdoor, fully covered			32.10521834348139, 34.82393134247579
Italy	Albricci	Naples	600 m		concrete	Outdoor			40.862160355198974, 14.27423579325886
Italy	Marco Polo	Andora	150 m		concrete	Outdoor			43.958167597886415, 8.143678644409354
Italy	Stadio Rino Mercante	Bassano del Grappa	400 m		concrete	Outdoor	Hosted 1985 UCI Track Cycling World Championships		45.77171923682645, 11.751296817533028
Italy		Busto Garolfo	385 m		concrete	Outdoor			45.5531840853691, 8.880220186287659
Italy	Vincenzo Capone	Marcianise	285 m		concrete	Outdoor			41.01885599033071, 14.292054584288985
Italy	Nino Borsari	Cavezzo	375 m		concrete	Outdoor			44.834986372140115, 11.027031169072522
Italy	Bandiera	Civitavecchia	465 m		concrete	Outdoor			42.072839195934876, 11.807867931836789
Italy	Velodromo Comunale	Dalmine	375 m		concrete	Outdoor			45.642052919734724, 9.612323009580686
Italy	Giovanile Salesiano	Donada	333.33 m		concrete	Outdoor			45.032601784066934, 12.216070415613766
Italy	Fausto Coppi	Turin	400 m		concrete	Outdoor			45.06820275576891, 7.71868747407242
Italy	Enzo Sacchi	Florence	333.33 m		concrete	Outdoor			43.77861655698324, 11.232721792326755
Italy	Pacciarelli	Fiorenzuola d'Arda	400 m		concrete	Outdoor			44.932633064325685, 9.912265636543204
Italy		Forano	250 m		concrete	Outdoor			42.299644505323656, 12.585481946251969
Italy	Glauco Servadei	Forli	400 m		concrete	Outdoor			44.21348349605591, 12.057694697699496
Italy	Carlini	Genova	450 m		concrete	Outdoor			44.4060314058246, 8.97896092377307
Italy	Guido Biondi	Lanciano	400 m		concrete	Outdoor			42.219672643398674, 14.382171084327489
Italy		Molinella	425 m		concrete	Outdoor			44.61941246539008, 11.671069827566699
Italy		Montallese	325 m		concrete	Outdoor			43.061730247614264, 11.913059969760434
Italy		Noto	350 m		concrete	Outdoor			36.89032718377878, 15.075257150336162
Italy		Oppido Lucano	250 m		concrete	Outdoor			40.76084845493909, 15.982761937701039
Italy	Velodromo Paolo Borsellino	Palermo	400 m		concrete	Outdoor	Hosted 1994 UCI Track Cycling World Championships.		38.17362978443569, 13.314030259063056
Italy		Pontecorvo	333.33 m		concrete	Outdoor			41.46219606014823, 13.660394455870952
Italy	Ottavio Bottecchia	Pordenone	400 m		concrete	Outdoor			45.95787747108635, 12.6481433733619
Italy	Pier Giovanni Mecchia	Portogruaro	395.80 m		concrete	Outdoor	opened in 1947		45.77496729047901, 12.831425070953358
Italy		Quartu Sant Elena	333.33 m		concrete	Outdoor			39.24581933635219, 9.199039165194726
Italy	Francone	San Francesco al Campo	400 m	32°	concrete	Outdoor			45.23376446674081, 7.659404764094204
Italy	Velodromo Fassa Bortolo	Montichiari, Brescia	250 m	43˚	wood	Indoor	Climate controlled. Opened 2010.		45.41457120995733, 10.408151815118464
Italy	Velodromo Lello Simeone	Barletta	333.33 m		concrete	Outdoor			41.31630576041177, 16.28561903457527
Italy	Velodromo Corrado Ardizzoni	Cento, Ferrara	396.4 m		concrete	Outdoor			44.723073377465994, 11.285373299752811
Italy	Velodromo Parco Nord	Milan			concrete	Outdoor			45.529668931551164, 9.204476061344605
Italy	Velodromo Vigorelli	Milan	397.27 m	42°	wood	Outdoor, track covered	Hosted UCI Track Cycling World Championships in 1939, 1951, 1955 and 1962. From 1935 to 1967, the hour record it was set exclusively at the Velodromo Vigorelli by nine different cyclists in 10 rides.		45.48151914704126, 9.157878200332355
Italy	Luigi Ganna Velodrome	Varese	446 m		concrete	Outdoor	Hosted 1971 UCI Track Cycling World Championships.		
Jamaica	Independence Park	Kingston	500 m		concrete	Outdoor			18.001349621033583, -76.77266437891414
Japan	Akashi Velodrome	Hyogo	400 m	29.6°/6°	asphalt	Outdoor		25 m	34.65386671514095°N 134.99458449389684°E
Japan	Aomori Keirin Velodrome	Aomori	400 m	32.2°/2.5°	asphalt	Outdoor		81 m	40.79705725107316°N 140.66543209112243°E
Japan	Beppu Keirin Velodrome	Oita	400 m	33.4°/2.5°	asphalt	Outdoor		2 m	33.32262559546969°N 131.4983893411817°E
Japan	Chiba JPF Dome	Chiba	250 m	42.6°	wood	Indoor	designed by Peter Junek	16 m	35.62143763647243°N 140.11479827858173°E
Japan	Fukui Keirin Velodrome	Fukui	400 m	31.3°/2.5°	asphalt	Outdoor	2025 Grandstand Renovated	6 m	36.06064498734898°N 136.2002192453558°E
Japan	Gifu Keirin Velodrome	Gifu	400 m	32.2°/2.5°	asphalt	Outdoor	Resurfaced in 2025	10 m	35.41353520861313°N 136.7838450724766°E
Japan	Hachinohe Velodrome	Aomori	333.33 m	36°/10°	asphalt	Outdoor	Renovated in 2025	49 m	40.501707306952824°N 141.54228791495672°E
Japan	Hakodate Keirin Velodrome	Hakodate	400 m	30.4°/3.3°	asphalt	Outdoor	8,000 spectator capacity	7 m	41.777326327206616°N 140.76383056046967°E
Japan	Hiratsuka Keirin Velodrome	Kanagawa	400 m	31.3°/3.3°	asphalt	Outdoor	rotationally hosted Keirin Grand Prix	4 m	35.32537847781367°N 139.36343432644807°E
Japan	Hiroshima Keirin Velodrome	Hiroshima	400 m	32.3°/3.3°	asphalt	Outdoor	Urban Sports Park and Hotel	0 m	34.35613004647372°N 132.46703675463647°E
Japan	Hofu Keirin Velodrome	Yamaguchi	333.33 m	34.4°/4.3°	asphalt	Outdoor	2024 Renovated. kids park	43 m	34.067586748202835°N 131.5786866073742°E
Japan	Ito Keirin Velodrome	Shizuoka	333.33 m	34.4°/3.3°	asphalt	Outdoor		33 m	34.954667°N 139.092639°E
Japan	Iwaki Taira Keirin Velodrome	Fukushima	400 m	32.5°/3.3°	concrete	Outdoor	International Architecture Awards 2012	10 m	37.04597522835785°N 140.89121140560934°E
Japan	Izumizaki International Cycle Stadium	Fukushima	333.33 m	38°	asphalt	Outdoor	UCI category 2 track	300 m	37.15481349865538°N 140.3226908712316°E
Japan	Izu Velodrome	Shizuoka	250 m	45°	wood	Indoor	Hosted Summer Olympics in 2021	334 m	35.011548106473015°N 139.01510801904527°E
Japan	Japan Cycle Sports Center	Shizuoka	400 m	30.4°	asphalt	Outdoor		300 m	35.01105799866994°N 139.01275260754835°E
Japan	JIK 333m Piste	Shizuoka	333.33 m	33.5°	asphalt	Outdoor	Part of Japan Institute of KEIRIN	269 m	35.003324°N 139.006939°E
Japan	JKA250	Shizuoka	250 m	42.8°/13.1°	wood	Indoor	Part of Japan Institute of KEIRIN	301 m	35.004366°N 139.011107°E
Japan	JKA400	Shizuoka	400 m	31.8°	asphalt	Outdoor	Part of Japan Institute of KEIRIN	286 m	35.002801°N 139.010297°E
Japan	Kansai Cycle Sports Center	Osaka	400 m		asphalt	Outdoor		296 m	34.4154239788907°N 135.53153584010403°E
Japan	Kawasaki Keirin Velodrome	Kanagawa	400 m	32.1°/3.3°	asphalt	Outdoor	20,000 spectator capacity	2 m	35.52837343548965°N 139.7105312902241°E
Japan	Keiokaku Keirin Velodrome	Tokyo	400 m	32.1°/2.5°	asphalt	Outdoor	72,657 highest spectators in 1972	30 m	35.642994167289395°N 139.53350186324056°E
Japan	Kishiwada Keirin Velodrome	Osaka	400 m	30.6°/2.5°	asphalt	Outdoor	24,000 spectator capacity	5 m	34.481208599951884°N 135.3928705478661°E
Japan	Kochi Keirin Velodrome	Kochi	500 m	24.3°/3.3°	asphalt	Outdoor	9,187 spectator capacity	3 m	33.55314985312268°N 133.53260159404556°E
Japan	Kokura Keirin Velodrome	Fukuoka	400 m	34.1°/3.3°	asphalt	Indoor		4 m	33.87192250927983°N 130.88782457243428°E
Japan	Komatsushima Keirin Velodrome	Tokushima	400 m	29.5°/2.5°	asphalt	Outdoor	seaside track illumination	1 m	34.005624968619756°N 134.5947549356548°E
Japan	Kumamoto Keirin Velodrome	Kumamoto	400 m	34.2°/2.5°	asphalt	Outdoor	Renovated from 2016 earthquakes	22 m	32.79532907365613°N 130.7404072496697°E
Japan	Kurayoshi Velodrome	Tottori	333.33 m	33°/7°	asphalt	Outdoor		194 m	35.428263993793074°N 133.70186442528785°E
Japan	Kurume Keirin Velodrome	Fukuoka	400 m	31.3°/3.3°	asphalt	Outdoor		38 m	33.300611°N 130.543972°E
Japan	Kyoto Mukomachi Keirin Velodrome	Kyoto	400 m	30.3°/3.3°	asphalt	Outdoor		39 m	34.94730844321399°N 135.69879744568445°E
Japan	Maebashi Keirin Velodrome	Gunma	335 m	36°/4°	asphalt	Indoor	Hosted 1990 UCI Championships	106 m	36.39729263881126°N 139.0574178018938°E
Japan	Matsudo Keirin Velodrome	Chiba	333.33 m	29.4°/3.1°	asphalt	Outdoor	Seating capacity of 11,733	3 m	35.804055255385606°N 139.91116501111975°E
Japan	Matsumoto Misuzuko Velodrome	Nagano	333.33 m	36°	asphalt	Outdoor		1012 m	36.259278°N 138.015167°E
Japan	Matsusaka Keirin Velodrome	Mie	400 m	34.3°/2.5°	asphalt	Outdoor	Cycle Training Center	9 m	34.56432443442724°N 136.53348865655732°E
Japan	Matsuyama Keirin Velodrome	Ehime	400 m	34.1°/2.5°	asphalt	Outdoor	Resurfaced in 2026	12 m	33.808238131808025°N 132.7419636496966°E
Japan	Misato Rokugo Velodrome	Akita	333.33 m	34.4°/8°	asphalt	Outdoor	photo finish	62 m	39.415348810749286°N 140.56265728368547°E
Japan	Miyagi Taiwa Velodrome	Miyagi	333.33 m	36˚	asphalt	Outdoor		52 m	38.424066896393°N 140.8650744245533°E
Japan	Miyazaki Velodrome	Miyazaki	333.33 m	33°	asphalt	Outdoor	Rebuilt in 2026	3 m	31.833433°N 131.448785°E
Japan	Nara Keirin Velodrome	Nara	333.33 m	33.3°/4.5°	asphalt	Outdoor	15,000 spectator capacity	77 m	34.70292575797961°N 135.7790682515693°E
Japan	Nagoya Keirin Velodrome	Aichi	400 m	34.1°/2.5°	asphalt	Outdoor	BMX Race Track	2 m	35.175672753340315°N 136.85385410001052°E
Japan	Nejime Velodrome	Kagoshima	333.33 m	36.3°	asphalt	Outdoor		217 m	31.200766446521015°N 130.79433849010917°E
Japan	Odawara Keirin Velodrome	Kanagawa	333.33 m	35.3°/3.3°	asphalt	Outdoor	17,000 spectator capacity	31 m	35.25124643262629°N 139.148721521454°E
Japan	Ogaki Keirin Velodrome	Gifu	400 m	30.4°/2.5°	asphalt	Outdoor	2026 Grandstand Renovated	5 m	35.361043887851956°N 136.6291297124019°E
Japan	Okinawa Awase Velodrome	Okinawa	333.33 m	45°	asphalt	Outdoor		3 m	26.306117856819174°N 127.82303232296648°E
Japan	Omiya Keirin Velodrome	Saitama	500 m	26.2°/3.3°	asphalt	Outdoor	Built in 1939	8 m	35.919094182196176°N 139.63353944605754°E
Japan	Ota Velodrome	Shimane	333.33 m	34°/7°	asphalt	Outdoor		5 m	35.228822381036984°N 132.5104022436362°E
Japan	Sakaigawa Velodrome	Yamanashi	400 m	31.3˚/7.2˚	asphalt	Outdoor	inside cyclocross track	301 m	35.600910637951316°N 138.60815374494115°E
Japan	Sasebo Keirin Velodrome	Nagasaki	400 m	31.3°/3.3°	asphalt	Outdoor	Renovated in 2026	4 m	33.15486702375305°N 129.7305700650212°E
Japan	Seibu-en Keirin Velodrome	Saitama	400 m	29.3°/2.5°	asphalt	Outdoor		81 m	35.76965091150362°N 139.4469828859802°E
Japan	Shiwa Velodrome	Iwate	333.33 m	34˚	asphalt	Outdoor	Wheelchair Stairlift	109 m	39.546654930332174°N 141.14944104986202°E
Japan	Shizuoka Keirin Velodrome	Shizuoka	400 m	30.4°/2.5°	asphalt	Outdoor	rotationally hosted Keirin Grand Prix	10 m	34.97241768663891°N 138.4193351389179°E
Japan	Tachikawa Keirin Velodrome	Tokyo	400 m	31.1°/2.2°	asphalt	Outdoor	rotationally hosted Keirin Grand Prix	83 m	35.702647260159196°N 139.4228319669393°E
Japan	Takamatsu Keirin Velodrome	Kagawa	400 m	33.2°/2.5°	asphalt	Outdoor		0 m	34.34665002657334°N 134.0617072325206°E
Japan	Takeo Keirin Velodrome	Saga	400 m	32°/2.2°	asphalt	Outdoor	Resurfaced in 2024	17 m	33.18334815586642°N 130.02376471049405°E
Japan	Tamano Keirin Velodrome	Okayama	400 m	30.4°/3.3°	asphalt	Outdoor	Seaside Stadium integrated with Athlete Hotel	2 m	34.49708089256163°N 133.96146879333898°E
Japan	Tokyo Dome	Tokyo	400 m	29.3°	wood	Indoor		7 m	35.70566570885902°N 139.75121538098628°E
Japan	Toride Keirin Velodrome	Ibaraki	400 m	31.3°/2.5°	asphalt	Outdoor		21 m	35.90137984109579°N 140.05692427008813°E
Japan	Toyama Keirin Velodrome	Toyama	333.33 m	33.4°/3.3°	asphalt	Outdoor	Resurfaced in 2025. Cycle Park	2 m	36.75781991571821°N 137.23499491909465°E
Japan	Toyohashi Keirin Velodrome	Aichi	400 m	33.5°/2.2°	asphalt	Outdoor		14 m	34.7702912155392°N 137.41820429833862°E
Japan	Uchinada Velodrome	Ishikawa	400 m		asphalt	Outdoor	Resurfaced from 2024 earthquake	42 m	36.664036104780436°N 136.65089762094058°E
Japan	Utsunomiya Keirin Velodrome	Tochigi	500 m	25.5°/2.5°	asphalt	Outdoor	23,000 spectator capacity	139 m	36.572528035991375°N 139.88372491908927°E
Japan	Wakayama Keirin Velodrome	Wakayama	400 m	32.2°/2.5°	asphalt	Outdoor	Resurfaced in 2025	3 m	34.24043925222597°N 135.17015680793295°E
Japan	Yahiko Keirin Velodrome	Niigata	400 m	32.2°/2.5°	asphalt	Outdoor		45 m	37.707349543281154°N 138.82830814777876°E
Japan	Yokkaichi Keirin Velodrome	Mie	400 m	32.2°/2.5°	asphalt	Outdoor		0 m	34.984678385541734°N 136.64629290444378°E
Kazakhstan	Saryarka Velodrome	Astana	250 m	44°/13.5°	wood	Indoor		349 m	51.10996921137654, 71.40699486005468
Libya	Al Madina	Tripoli	400 m	unknown	concrete	Outdoor	lights	5 m	32.888306°N 13.165293°E
Lithuania	Cido Arena	Panevėžys	250 m	unknown	wood	Indoor		51 m	55.733400°N 24.339162°E
Lithuania	Klaipėda Velodrome	Klaipėda	333.33 m	unknown	concrete	Outdoor	lights	12 m	55.732363°N 21.134546°E
Malaysia	Velodrome Rakyat	Ipoh	250 m	unknown	wood	Outdoor	painted, underpass, lights	51 m	4.609273°N 101.100867°E
Malaysia	Velodrom Nasional Malaysia	Nilai	250 m	unknown	wood	Indoor			2.842647°N 101.786346°E
Malaysia	Velodrome Iskandar Puteri	Johor	250 m	unknown	wood	Indoor			1.4265858°N 103.6402052°E
Mexico	Aguascalientes Bicentenary Velodrome	Aguascalientes	250 m	41˚/12˚	wood	Indoor	Hosted 2010 Pan American Track Championships	1887 m	21.89751085840579, -102.28365912968424
Mexico	Radamés Treviño Velodrome	Monterrey	333.33 m		concrete	Outdoor			25.717199062791906, -100.31249620007507
Mexico	State Sports Institute Velodrome	Aguascalientes	333.33 m	34˚	concrete	Outdoor	Not in use, cracked track surface		21.87974680783964, -102.2710620063947
Mexico	Velodromo Agustín Melgar	Mexico City	333.33 m	39˚	concrete	Outdoor	Built for the 1968 Summer Olympics. Built in wood, converted in concrete later. 6,800 spectator capacity.	2260 m	19.409784472858103, -99.1034046025673
Mexico	Velódromo Panamericano	Guadalajara	250 m	39˚/12˚	wood	Indoor	Hosted the 2011 Pan American Games	1550 m	20.648346644904507, -103.32436781565902
Mexico	Centro Deportivo	Mexico City	400 m		concrete	Outdoor			
Mexico	Lopez Mateos	Guadalajara	400 m		concrete	Outdoor			20.648620324027572, -103.36711156478302
Mexico	Velodromo Gobierno De Baja California Sur	La Paz	333.33 m		concrete	Outdoor			24.12115116613304, -110.3162818333392
Mexico		Leon	333.33 m		concrete	Outdoor			
Mexico		Los Cabos	250 m		concrete	Outdoor			
Mexico	Centro de Alto Rendimiento de Baja California (CAR)	Tijuana	250 m	39˚/12˚	wood	Outdoor		20 m	32.53521112916643, -116.96866787723117
Mexico	Centro Nacional de Alto Rendimiento	Mexico City	250 m		wood	Indoor	Hosted 2009 and 2013 Pan American Track Cycling Championships	2200 m	19.40259842716616, -99.0917828517035
Morocco		Casablanca	333.33 m	unknown	concrete	Outdoor	underpass	30 m	33.589301°N 7.645600°W
Netherlands	Omnisport Apeldoorn	Apeldoorn	250 m	unknown	wood	Indoor	Hosted 2011 and 2018 UCI Track Cycling World Championships and 2011, 2013, 2019 and 2024 UEC European Track Championships	10 m	52.209286°N 5.997509°E
Netherlands	Sportpaleis Alkmaar	Alkmaar	250 m	42°	wood	Indoor		0 m	52.634669°N 4.716645°E
Netherlands	Velodrome	Amsterdam	200 m	47°	wood	Indoor		1 m	52.339600°N 4.807748°E
Netherlands	Laco sportcentrum Glanerbrook	Geleen	500 m	unknown	concrete	Outdoor			50.96614068184012, 5.834874150671496
Netherlands	Regionaal Wielercentrum Noord	Assen	200 m	unknown	wood	Outdoor	There are plans for a semi-Indoor roof	10 m	52.9829724157353, 6.5451594098492825
New Caledonia	Magenta Aérodrome	Nouméa	333.33 m	unknown	concrete	Outdoor	lights	14 m	22.264120°S 166.467716°E
New Zealand	Denton Park	Christchurch	400 m		concrete	Outdoor	Hosted the 1974 British Commonwealth Games		-43.541753995544255, 172.52041971505508
New Zealand	Grassroots Trust Velodrome (formerly called Avantidrome)	Cambridge	250 m	43.5°	wood	Indoor			37.88963°S 175.43479°E
New Zealand	SIT Zero Fees Velodrome	Invercargill	250 m		wood	Indoor	Built for city of Invercargill, New Zealand. Hosted 2012 UCI Juniors Track World Championships. Used for Oceania Championships, National Champs. Major sponsor: Southern Institute of Technology		-46.407237791625924, 168.38089307947683
New Zealand	Laurie Roberts Velodrome	Levin	450 m	15° (?)	Asphalt	Outdoor	lights		
New Zealand	Manukau Velodrome	Auckland	285.714 m	43.5°	concrete	Outdoor	Hosted the 1990 Commonwealth Games		-36.983588948799515, 174.88627728416637
New Zealand	Saxton Velodrome	Nelson	333 m	25° (?)	Asphalt	Outdoor	Built in 2017. Replaced the Trafalgar Park Velodrome		-41.332586171306716, 173.20635983512958
New Zealand	Taranaki Cycle Park	New Plymouth	333 m	25° (?)	Asphalt	Outdoor	Officially opened 2012		-39.025147833461176, 174.13833558903158
New Zealand	Rotorua Velodrome	Rotorua	333.33 m		concrete	Outdoor	Built by the cycling clubs of Rotorua, New Zealand		-38.150818536750144, 176.22464147625288
New Zealand	Seddon Park Velodrome	Dunedin	250 m	42°	concrete	Outdoor			-45.87704531819787, 170.35424265931186
New Zealand	Te Awamutu Velodrome		450 m			Outdoor			-37.889830640457426, 175.4349096259683
New Zealand	Temuka		400 m			Outdoor			-44.413955788358244, 171.26342285511433
New Zealand	Timaru		400 m			Outdoor			-44.41390642957891, 171.2633229570504
New Zealand	Tinwald	Ashburton	400 m			Outdoor			-43.92391910915498, 171.709094766869
New Zealand	Waimate	Waimate	400 m			Outdoor			-44.7381232869681, 171.0383349616751
New Zealand	Trust Bank Velodrome	Wanganui	250 m		wood	Outdoor	Built in 1995 by Ron Webb.		-39.9350461526573, 175.05093391623396
New Zealand	Wellington Velodrome	Wellington	333.33 m	33°	concrete	Outdoor	Built in 1968; opened early 1969. Hosted the 1981 NZ (International) Summer Games.		-41.305640990297036, 174.78941055176554
New Zealand	Athletic Park	Blenheim	450 m		asphalt	Outdoor			-41.52094414521928, 173.9416685351356
Nigeria	Abuja Velodrome	Abuja	250 m	42°/12°	concrete	Outdoor, fully covered		486 m	9.039207°N 7.457251°E
Norway	Asker Velodromen	Asker, Asker Municipality	200 m	46,8°	wood	Indoor	Built in 2020 - 2023, opened January 13, 2024.	68 m	59.82548N, 10.4532E
Norway	Halden Velodrom	Ystehede, Halden Municipality	Unknown	Unknown	Asphalt	Outdoor	Built in 1979, renovated in 2016.	40 m	59.066584°N 11.415203°E
Norway	Prestmoen sykkelvelodrom	Prestmoen, Stjørdal Municipality	297 m	Unknown	Asphalt	Outdoor	Built in 1976, renovated in 1997.	2 m	63.45127648372652°N 10.990962982177734°E
Norway	Sola Arena	Solakrossen, Sola Municipality	250 m	42°	wood	Indoor	Built in 2019 - 2021, opened September 30, 2021.	8 m	58.8956594N, 5.6629837,17E
Pakistan	Quaid e Azam International Cycling Velodrome	Lahore	333.33 m	42°	concrete	Outdoor		207 m	31.511995°N 74.330070°E
Peru	Velodrome Cerro Juli	Arequipa	333.33 m	unknown	concrete	Outdoor	underpass, lights	2295 m	16.430896°S 71.546189°W
Peru	Velódromo de la Videna	Lima	250 m	42°	wood	Indoor	Hosted 2019 Pan American Games	177 m	12.079698°S 76.999126°W
Peru	Velodrome Chiclayo- Colegio San José	Chiclayo	200 m	48°	wood	Outdoor	underpass	177 m	-6.777670762513299, -79.85127334520664
Peru	Velodrome Puente del Ejército	Lima	250 m	unknown	concrete	Outdoor	underpass	127 m	12.039646°S 77.044733°W
Philippines	Tagaytay Velodrome	Tagaytay	250 m	unknown	wood	Indoor	Replaces the Amoranto Velodrome	670 m	14.098597°N 120.939323°E
Poland	BGŻ Arena	Pruszków	250 m	42°	wood	Indoor	Hosted 2009 and 2019 UCI Track Cycling World Championship	92 m	52.163591°N 20.821674°E
Poland	Welodrom im. Wernera Józefa Grundmanna	Wrocław	200 m	unknown	concrete	Outdoor		116 m	51.157512°N 17.029855°E
Poland	Orzeł	Warsaw	333.33 m	unknown	concrete	Outdoor	disrepair	83 m	52.251002°N 21.072798°E
Poland	Szafera	Szczecin	400 m	unknown	concrete	Outdoor, track covered		31 m	53.459113°N 14.497490°E
Poland	Społem	Łódź	402 m	unknown	concrete	Outdoor		213 m	51.781481°N 19.471492°E
Poland	KTK Kalisz	Kalisz	500 m	unknown	concrete	Outdoor		104 m	51.758385°N 18.100713°E
Poland	GK Żyrardów	Żyrardów	300 m	unknown	concrete	Outdoor		111 m	52.056770°N 20.425921°E
Portugal	Pista de Alpiarça	Alpiarça	400 m	38,6º	concrete	Outdoor		17 m	39.252054°N 8.589790°W
Portugal	Pista da Malveira	Malveira	406 m		asphalt	Outdoor		250 m	38.934231°N 9.256697°W
Portugal	Sangalhos National Velodrome	Sangalhos, Anadia Municipality	250 m	42°	wood	Indoor	designed by Peter Junek	51 m	40.479630°N 8.476070°W
Puerto Rico	Velodromo Panamericano	Coamo City	333.33 m	48°	Concrete	Outdoor			18.068971885935692, -66.36544767022788
Romania	Velodromul Dinamo	Bucharest	400 m		concrete				44.45839334180855, 26.102548911388674
Russia	Krylatskoe Velodrome	Moscow	333.33 m	42˚	wood	Indoor	Built in 1979 as venue for 1980 Summer Olympics.		55.76297130272128, 37.4329550012692
Russia	Lokosfinks Velodrome	St. Petersburg	250 m		wood	Indoor	Built 2007–2008.		59.97471429162953, 30.227037606433363
Russia	Omsk Velotrack	Omsk	250 m		wood	Indoor	Built 2013–2014.		55.005027028825744, 73.36039569029934
Slovenia	Velodrom Novo Mesto	Novo Mesto	250 m		wood	Inflatable dome			45.805873645727196, 15.127704925955758
Taiwan	Kaohsiung Nanzih Velodrome	Kaohsiung City	333 m		concrete	Outdoor	https://iplay.sa.gov.tw/GymInfo/Index/6749?istraffic=1		22.733879734588864, 120.33339319212706
Taiwan	Tainan Velodrome	Tainan City	400 m		concrete	Outdoor	https://iplay.sa.gov.tw/GymInfo/Index/5347		22.976461288005787, 120.21083670200154
Taiwan	Hsinchu Velodrome	Hsinchu City	333 m		concrete	Outdoor	https://iplay.sa.gov.tw/gyminfo/index/5894		24.792460435544868, 120.98230422375295
Taiwan	Taichung Velodrome	Taichung City	333 m		wood	Outdoor	https://iplay.sa.gov.tw/GymInfo/Index/10164		
South Africa	Cyril Geoghegan Cycle Stadium	Durban	433 m	42°	concrete	Outdoor			-29.81911659179337, 31.030760368634127
South Africa	Hector Norris Velodrome	Johannesburg	460 m		concrete	Outdoor			-26.232702987837367, 28.051663396834496
South Africa	Pilditch Stadium	Pretoria	250 m	47°	concrete	Outdoor			-25.751516329021502, 28.164834230773234
South Africa	Westbourne Oval	Port Elizabeth	500 m		concrete	Outdoor			-33.96030628561582, 25.60858100367437
South Africa	Alexandra Park	Pietermaritzburg	460 m	25°	concrete	Outdoor			-29.609837625005504, 30.38266758397117
South Korea	Changwon Velodrome	Changwon	250 m		wood	Indoor			35.232038645629586, 128.66787192274833
South Korea	Gwangmyeong Speedom	Gwangmyeong	333.33 m	34°/4°	asphalt concrete	Indoor			37.466741723428356, 126.8451816534965
South Korea	Incheon Velodrome	Incheon	333.33 m			Outdoor			37.466787318624995, 126.84538215282551
South Korea	Olympic Velodrome	Seoul	333.33 m	38°/10°	wood	Outdoor	Built for the 1988 Summer Olympics. Seating capacity of 6,322.		37.51687954722574, 127.12330179476764
Spain	Velódromo de Anoeta	San Sebastián	285.714 m	48º	concrete	Indoor	Built in 1965. 5,500 spectator capacity. Also known as Belodromoa. Hosted 1965 and 1973 UCI Track Cycling World Championships		43.298748788019886, -1.9723087714595366
Spain	Velòdrom d'Horta	Barcelona	250 m	41°	wood	Outdoor	Built in 1984. Hosted 1984 UCI Track Cycling World Championships and 1992 Summer Olympics. Designed by Esteve Bonell and Francesc Rius.		41.43803732647341, 2.1488421181298296
Spain	Velódromo Luis Puig	Valencia	250 m	42º	concrete	Indoor	Painted. Built in 1992. 6,500 spectator capacity. Hosted 1992 UCI Track Cycling World Championships		39.500605228935676, -0.42737169246845746
Spain	Palma Arena	Palma de Mallorca	250 m	43°/15°	wood	Indoor	Built in 2007. 5,000 spectator capacity. Hosted 2007 UCI Track Cycling World Championships		39.588172119793455, 2.6430557630455036
Spain	Velodromo Municipal	Posadas	250 m		concrete	Outdoor			37.80552907859114, -5.098841416916948
Spain	Velódromo de Galapagar	Madrid	250 m		resin	Indoor			40.58211114389954, -4.010705932915308
Spain	Velódromo de Mataró	Mataró	200 m			Outdoor			41.54629292359217, 2.439757409420641
Sweden	YA Arena	Falun	190 m	50°	wood	Indoor	Designed by Peter Junek, Sweden's first Indoor velodrome since 1927. Sweden had 7 in 1905. And there is still a disused velodrome in Trelleborg that was used between 1976 and 1990. UPDATE: During 2016 the Trelleborg velodrome was refurbished.		60.59303909182607, 15.642475529195522
Switzerland	Vélodrome de Genève - Piste Tony Rominger	Geneva	166.66 m	56°	wood	Indoor	Refurbished in 2014		46.196336233665214, 6.131925145829526
Switzerland	Oerlikon Velodrome	Zürich	333.33 m	44.8°	concrete with multip	Outdoor	Hosted seven times the UCI Track Cycling World Championships (1923, 1929, 1936, 1946, 1953, 1961, 1983)		47.40951565744016, 8.551391174154066
Switzerland	Hallenstadion	Zurich	200 m		wood	Indoor			47.41167768348771, 8.551490750123097
Switzerland	Centre Mondial du Cyclisme	Aigle	200 m	46.7°	wood	Indoor			46.31859451204102, 6.933599557478744
Switzerland	Velodrome Suisse	Grenchen	250 m	46°	wood	Indoor	Hosted 2015 UEC European Track Championships. Hour records: Jens Voigt 51.110 km in 2014; Rohan Dennis 52.491 km in 2015; Daniel Bigham 55.548 km in 2022; Filippo Ganna 56.792 km in 2022; Joss Lowden set a former women's record 48.405 km in 2021.	450 m	47.1855598°N 7.4050980°E
Thailand	Suphan Buri Velodrome	Suphan Buri	333.33 m		concrete	Outdoor			14.453742878664531, 100.11103734691378
Thailand	Chiang Mai Velodrome	Chiang Mai	333.33 m		concrete	Outdoor			18.843375772120638, 98.9574629807698
Thailand	Hua Mark Velodrome	Bangkok	333.33 m		concrete	Outdoor			13.757727434361003, 100.6258938336891
Thailand	Nakon Ratchisima Velodrome	Korat	333.33 m		concrete	Outdoor			14.924573551789729, 102.04751358370291
Trinidad and Tobago	Arima Velodrome	Arima	450 m	unknown	concrete	Outdoor	lights	62.817 m	10.637142°N 61.284243°W
Trinidad and Tobago	Skinner Park	San Fernando, Trinidad and Tobago	333.33 m	unknown	concrete	Outdoor	lights	7.767 m	10.267056°N 61.460705°W
Trinidad and Tobago	Palo Seco Velodrome	Palo Seco		unknown	concrete	Outdoor	lights	16.954 m	10.084543°N 61.601519°W
Trinidad and Tobago	Irwin Park Sporting Complex	Siparia	333.33 m	unknown	concrete	Outdoor	lights	64.620 m	10.145067°N 61.505848°W
Trinidad and Tobago	National Cycling Velodrome	Couva	250 m	42°	wood	Indoor		32.382 m	10.426881°N 61.415937°W
Turkey	Konya Velodrome	Meram, Konya	250 m	45.5°	wood	Indoor		1120 m	37°49′10.4″N 32°24′01.4″E
Turkmenistan	Welotrek sport toplumy in Olympic Village	Ashgabat	250 m	40°	wood	Indoor	Designed by Peter Junek		37.90221949639839, 58.37429885350937
Ukraine	Kyiv Velotrack	Kyiv	285 m	38°	concrete	Outdoor			50.448665°N 30.505684°E
United Arab Emirates	Zayed Velodrome	Sharjah	250 m	42°	concrete	Outdoor		35 m	25.315786°N 55.522188°E
England	Aldersley Track	Aldersley, Wolverhampton	458.56 m	22.5°	asphalt	Outdoor			52.60484748707965, -2.150406772219748
England	Bournemouth Cycle Centre	Bournemouth, Dorset	250 m		tarmac	Outdoor	Opened June 2011		50.746758099999994, -1.8938857465800958
England	Calshot Velodrome	Calshot (near Southampton)	142.857 m	45˚/20˚	wood	Indoor	Short steeply banked track housed inside an old aircraft hangar, the original track was longer. Track was rebuilt with a wooden surface by Ron Webb in 1996.		50.81853459962998, -1.3074552978957301
England	Derby Arena	Derby	250 m	42°	wood	Indoor	Velodrome and sports arena designed by FaulknerBrowns Architects. Opened in March 2015.		52.91269351181585, -1.4466225361795404
England	Forest Town Welfare	Mansfield, Nottinghamshire	402 m	10˚	tarmac	Outdoor	Built in 1908, the track has 4 bankings, built in a rectangle shape around the football pitch.		53.15148889674064, -1.1613307796588612
England	Gosling Sports Park	Welwyn Garden City	460.95 m		asphalt	Outdoor			51.7914800121282, -0.21048503899084792
England	Herne Hill Velodrome	London	450 m	30°	tarmac	Outdoor	A track in a shallow concrete bowl, constructed in 1891. Centenary rebuild by Ron Webb, concrete, completed 1992. Resurfaced in tarmac in 2011.		51.45116351173236, -0.09150628355621461
England	London Velopark	Leyton, east London	250 m	42˚	wood	Indoor	Hosted 2012 Summer Olympics and 2016 UCI Track Cycling World Championships		51.55042865834519, -0.01524374917131561
England	Long View Leisure	Huyton Knowsley, Merseyside	400 m			Outdoor			53.414960934135706, -2.8290928339453747
England	Lyme Valley Stadium	Newcastle-under-Lyme, Staffordshire	400.05 m		asphalt	Outdoor			52.9977324063497, -2.214952485653115
England	Manchester Velodrome	Manchester	250 m	42°	wood	Indoor	National Cycling Centre and home of British cycling, designed by FaulknerBrowns Architects and built in 1994. Hosted 2000 and 2008 UCI Track Cycling World Championships		53.48557932770764, -2.1919559723870754
England	Middlesbrough Sports Village	Middlesbrough	250 m	30°	tarmac	Outdoor	Opened September 2015		54.54866092931822, -1.2077204199297147
England	Halesowen Velodrome	Halesowen, West Midlands	400 m		asphalt	Outdoor	Opened 1947		52.443296587221894, -2.039073380928749
England	The Mountbatten Centre	Portsmouth	535.6 m		asphalt	Outdoor	D-shaped track – two partial bends into a banked straight and flat D-shaped loop		50.82566119152457, -1.0822733941384939
England	Palmer Park Stadium	Reading	459.15 m		asphalt	Outdoor			51.45197094877265, -0.9370570988370062
England	Poole Park Track	Poole, Dorset	534 m		tarmac				
England	Preston Park Velodrome	Brighton, East Sussex	579.03 m		tarmac	Outdoor	Built in 1877, the oldest velodrome in the UK		50.84312130362058, -0.14716489817993467
England	Quibell Park Stadium	Scunthorpe	485.06 m		asphalt	Outdoor			53.58253008833545, -0.6786774245087003
England	Roundhay Park	Leeds, West Yorkshire			soil and grass	Outdoor	Grasstrack		53.8372694637008, -1.4986721649792003
England	Richmondshire Velodrome	Richmond, North Yorkshire	364 m		grass	Outdoor	Built 1892, a banked velodrome covered with grass. It was used for league races through the summer and hosted national grass track meetings. Not used since 2016		54.40496945499476, -1.7403822716224644
England	York Sport Velodrome	York, North Yorkshire	250 m	30°	tarmac	Outdoor	Opened in July 2014 to coincide with the Tour de France 2014.		53.94979805852927, -1.0165328682075523
Scotland	Caird Park	Dundee	402.34 m		concrete	Outdoor			56.48345563285878, -2.955251571567777
Scotland	Sir Chris Hoy Velodrome	Glasgow	250 m	45˚	wood	Indoor	Opened October 2012. Hosted 2018 UEC European Track Championships		55.84723923176922, -4.208431028116515
Wales	Carmarthen Park	Carmarthen	405.38 m		concrete	Outdoor	Built 1900, oldest concrete velodrome in the world in continuous use		51.85475548048393, -4.315973032710367
Wales	Maindy Stadium	Cardiff	459.37 m	18˚	concrete	Outdoor	Used in the 1958 British Empire and Commonwealth Games		51.49691282433337, -3.1900004887251057
Wales	Geraint Thomas National Velodrome	Newport	250 m	42˚	wood	Indoor	Welsh National Velodrome opened in 2003		51.574281608867864, -2.9574366171914876
Northern Ireland	Tommy Givan Track	Orangefield, Belfast	396 m		tarmac	Outdoor	Orangefield Track opened 1957, renamed Tommy Givan Track in 1981		54.586304025522715, -5.879391802246115
United States	Boulder Valley Velodrome	Erie, Colorado	250 m	42˚	wood	Outdoor	Opened in 2015, Renovated 2023	1564 m	40.029300689697266, -105.05184173583984
United States	Olympic Training Center Velodrome	Colorado Springs, Colorado	333.33 m	33˚	concrete	Inflatable dome	Built in 1982 in preparation for the 1984 Summer Olympics in LA.	1840 m	38.82903876271046, -104.79581345266047
United States	Cleveland velodrome	Cleveland, Ohio	166.66 m		wood	Outdoor	Built in 2012	207 m	41.47169505372669, -81.65455779288767
United States	Major Taylor Velodrome	Indianapolis, Indiana	333.33 m	28˚ / 9˚	concrete	Outdoor	Hosted the 1987 Pan American Games.	215 m	39.82185682144557, -86.19926154005711
United States	The Alkek Velodrome	Houston, Texas	333.33 m	33˚	concrete	Outdoor	Built 1986.	32 m	29.79830412563597, -95.69542078648658
United States	Dick Lane Velodrome	East Point, Georgia (near Atlanta)	321.8 m	36˚	concrete	Outdoor	Built 1972.	295 m	33.68505007028783, -84.4516828872925
United States	Asheville Velodrome	Asheville, North Carolina	500 m	4–8˚	asphalt	Outdoor	Converted from race car track in 2001.	602 m	35.565819317048906, -82.58157631531436
United States	Baton Rouge Velodrome	Baton Rouge, Louisiana	333.33 m		concrete	Outdoor	Re-opened March 2010 after extensive renovation	8 m	30.397898053338388, -91.11548936278881
United States	Lexus Velodrome	Detroit, Michigan	166.66 m	50˚	wood	Inflatable dome	Built in 2017.	189 m	42.351823044773575, -83.05016675114304
United States	Brian Piccolo Velodrome	Cooper City, Florida (near Fort Lauderdale)	333.33 m 200 m	30˚/>10˚	concrete	Outdoor	Two tracks: one competitive and one recreational.	1 m	26.035015137868868, -80.26901990168798
United States	Encino Velodrome	Encino, Los Angeles, California	250 m	28˚	concrete	Outdoor		217 m	34.181890919439596, -118.50892021132279
United States	Ed Rudolph Velodrome	Northbrook, Illinois (near Chicago)	382 m	18˚	epoxy on concrete	Outdoor	Built 1959, renovated 2004	195 m	42.1231575610149, -87.81822945960509
United States	Garden State Velodrome	Wall, New Jersey	400 m	33˚ / 15˚	asphalt	Outdoor	Term when Wall Township Speedway is used for cycling, Built in 1950.	43 m	40.175316803265, -74.11203640348462
United States	Hellyer Park Velodrome	San Jose, California (San Francisco Bay Area)	335 m	23˚	concrete	Outdoor		47 m	37.28789424939167, -121.81326696541662
United States	Kissena Park Velodrome	Flushing, Queens, New York City	400 m		asphalt	Outdoor	Built in 1962, resurfaced in 2004.	5 m	40.74474499505884, -73.80984786998295
United States	VELO Sports Center	Carson, California (near Los Angeles)	250 m	45˚	wood	Indoor	Built in 2004. Siberian pine. First and only permanent Indoor track of international standard in United States. Will be venue for 2028 Summer Olympics.	11 m	33.85892710926973, -118.25968645787545
United States	Jerry Baker Memorial Velodrome (formerly Marymoor Velodrome)	Redmond, Washington (near Seattle)	400 m	25˚	concrete	Outdoor	Built 1974, resurfaced 2005.	12 m	47.665597703997484, -122.11196598505441
United States	Northeast Velodrome	Londonderry, New Hampshire	333.33 m	14˚	asphalt	Outdoor	Runs events on Tuesday (Mass Start Racing), Thursday (Timed Events), Saturday (Structured Training and Open Track) and Sunday (Omnium). Re-opened in 2017	87 m	42.9201666980169, -71.41428331353444
United States	Penrose Park	St. Louis, Missouri	322 m	28˚	concrete	Outdoor	Built in 1962, resurfaced in 1984, completely resurfaced in concrete overlay in 2019.	42 m	38.68494943118909, -90.24561909918587
United States	San Diego Velodrome	San Diego, California	333.33 m	27˚	asphalt on concrete	Outdoor	Built 1976, resurfaced in 2016	81 m	32.7370346914474, -117.14090387575436
United States	Tucson Velodrome	Tucson, Arizona	250 m	42°	aluminium	Outdoor	First veldrome in the world built in aluminium. Designed by Peter Junek.		
United States	Valley Preferred Cycling Center	Breinigsville, Pennsylvania	333.33 m	28-30˚ / 12.5˚	concrete	Outdoor	Built 1975 as Lehigh County Velodrome, renovated 1995. 30-degree banked turns and 12.5-degree straightaways.	122 m	40.54729256289322, -75.61069786388089
United States	Washington Park Velodrome	Kenosha, Wisconsin	333.33 m	27˚	concrete	Outdoor	Built in 1927. Renovated in 2016	183 m	42.59923820296997, -87.83040085925535
United States	Giordana Velodrome	Rock Hill, South Carolina (Charlotte, NC region)	250 m	42.5˚/17°	concrete	Outdoor		206 m	34.9764°N 80.9780°W
Uruguay	Pista de Ciclismo de El Jagüel	Punta del Este	1190 m	unknown	asphalt	Outdoor	Opened in 2002; closed in 2014; re-opened in 2020		34.9210°S 54.92200°W
Uruguay	Velódromo Municipal de Montevideo	Montevideo	333.33 m	unknown	concrete	Outdoor	Opened in 1938; hosted partly the 1968 UCI Track Cycling World Championships		34.8980°S 56.1560°W
Uruguay	Velódromo Municipal de Paysandú	Paysandú	333.33 m	unknown	concrete	In re-construction as of 2022			32.3330°S 58.0834°W
Uzbekistan		Tashkent	333.33 m		concrete	Outdoor			41.36056939576482, 69.19910994206235
Venezuela	Polideportivo Libertador	Coro	333.33 m		concrete	Outdoor			11.422081956549771, -69.65975991949014
Venezuela	La Paragua	Ciudad Bolivar	333.33 m		concrete	Outdoor			8.08130368469085, -63.51916525129767
Venezuela	Urbanizacion Tiuna	Maracay	333.33 m		concrete	Outdoor			10.262834418041924, -67.61104346052356
Venezuela	Velódromo José de Jesús Mora Figueroa	San Cristobal	333.33 m		concrete	Outdoor			7.791205713467679, -72.20253400527359
Venezuela	Teo Capriles	Caracas	333.33 m	40°/10°	concrete	Outdoor			10.473117941559634, -66.94771581634431
Venezuela	Maximo Romero	Valencia	333.33 m		concrete	Outdoor			10.14366894232584, -68.00020744195946

== Velodromes no longer in use ==
Velodrome	Location	Length	Banking	Surface	Opened	Closed	Notes	Altitude	Location
Argentina
Buenos Aires Municipal	Buenos Aires	333 m or 1,093 ft							
Gen. Belgrano Park Velodrome	Salta	333 m or 1,093 ft							
Luna Park	Buenos Aires								
Don Pedro Milanese Velodrome									
	Formosa	333 m							
Australia
Maurice Kirby Velodrome	Noble Park, Victoria	430 m	6°	asphalt		2019			
Azerbaijan
Baku Velodrome	Baku	333 m or 1,093 ft		concrete					
Brazil
Barra Velodrome	Rio de Janeiro, Nelson Piquet International Autodrome	250 m		wood			indoor. Built for the 2007 Pan American Games. Demolished in 2013	5 m	
Velódromo da USP	São Paulo	285.714 m	unknown	concrete	1977	stopped being used in the 1990s due to lack of maintenance	lights, underpass, stadium, multi-use infield;	727 m	23.560275°S 46.715314°W
Canada
China Creek Velodrome	Vancouver	245 m or 804 ft	42˚	wood			Outdoor track. Built for the 1954 British Empire and Commonwealth Games. Rebuilt 1973. Demolished 1980.		
Olympic Velodrome (Montreal)	Montreal	285 m or 935 ft	48˚	wood			Indoor track. Built for the 1976 Summer Olympics. Converted into the Montreal Biodome in 1989.		
Vélodrome de Queen's Park	Verdun, Montreal			wood			Hosted 1899 ICA Track Cycling World Championships.		
Vélodrome Louis Garneau	Quebec City						Demolished in November 2007		
Winnipeg Velodrome	Winnipeg, Manitoba	400 m or 1,300 ft	38˚	concrete			Built for the 1967 Pan-American Games, demolished 1998		
Bromont Velodrome	Bromont, Quebec	250m		wood			Outdoor. Opened in 2001, using the wooden track formerly used at the 1996 Summer Olympics in Atlanta, Georgia.		
Vélodrome Caisse Populaire de Dieppe	Dieppe, New Brunswick	250 m	39˚	wood			Demolished in 2018		
Croatia
Stadion Koturaška	Zagreb	500 m	unknown	concrete			Outdoor. Built in 1894. Demolished in 1950s		45.80063889°N 15.96855556°E|-
Czech Republic
Pardubice	Pardubice	500 m or 1,640 ft		concrete			Outdoor track. Built 1931, Schurmann design. Renovated 1974.		
Denmark
Ordrup Velodrome	Ordrup, Copenhagen	370 m or 1,210 ft	40˚	cement	1888	2000	Outdoor track. Renovated 1893, 1903, 1987.		55°45′44″N 12°34′47″E
Georgia
Tbilisi Central Velodrome	Tbilisi	220 m or 722 ft		concrete			Outdoor track		
Tbilisi Velodrome	Tbilisi	400 m or 1,312 ft		wood			Outdoor track		
Germany
Olympiahalle	München	285 m or 935 ft		wood			Built for 1972 Olympic Games, demolished 2015.		
Hanns-Martin-Schleyer-Halle	Stuttgart	285.714 m		wood			Palace still in place but track removed (not available anymore)		
Neue Messe München	München	200 m	44°	wood			Hosted 2022 UEC European Track Championships, temporary. Track has been disassembled.		
Reichelsdorfer Keller	Nürnberg	400 m		concrete			Derelict		
Schanzenberg-Bahn	Saarbrücken	333.33 m		concrete			Derelict		
Westfalenhallen	Dortmund	200 m or 660 ft		indoor			Palace still in place but track removed (not available anymore)		
Wuelfel	Hannover	333 m or 1,093 ft	49°	wood			Outdoor. Still existing, but no longer in use		
France
Parc des Princes	Paris	666 m or 2,185 ft egg shape / 454 m or 1,490 ft oval					Built 1897. Tour de France finish from its beginning in 1903. Track reduced in size in 1924 for Olympic Games. Track demolished 1967.		
Vélodrome Buffalo	Neuilly-sur-Seine								
Vélodrome d'Hiver	Paris	333 m or 1,093 ft					Built in 1902, in the Salles des Machines which had previously housed the industrial display of the Exposition Universelle (1900). Used to hold thousands of Jews who were victims of a mass arrest during the Nazi occupation in 1942. The velodrome was partly destroyed by fire and the building subsequently demolished in 1959.		
Vélodrome de la Seine	Levallois-Perret						Owned by Adolphe Clément from circa 1893-1900		
Hong Kong
Hong Kong Sports Institute	Sha Tin						Demolished 2009.		
Ireland
Goff Cycle Track	Waterford, Ireland	400 m or 1,312 ft		cinder and tarmac			Outdoor track, donated to the People's Park in Waterford City by Sir W. G. D. Goff. Still exists but is covered in grass.		
Italy
Olympic Velodrome	Rome	400 m or 1,300 ft	37.27° / 9.55°	Cameroonian doussie			Outdoor track. Built in 1957–1960. Demolished in 2008 due to inactivity.		
Palazzo dello Sport	Milan						Indoor track in the Palazzo dello Sport. Built in November 1923, and possibly a removable installation.		
Palasport di San Siro	Milan						Indoor track. Built in 1970–1976. Demolished in 1988 due to inactivity.		
Stadio Tonino Benelli	Pesaro	500 m		concrete			Soccer stadium. Velodrome partially removed.		
Japan
Aizu Keirin Velodrome	Fukushima	333.3 m			1950	1963			
Chiba Keirin Velodrome	Chiba	500 m	24.1°/2.5°	asphalt	1949	2015	Rebuilt as Chiba JPF Dome		
Fukuoka Keirin Velodrome	Fukuoka	500 m			1950	1962			
Hachioji Velodrome	Tokyo	400 m	45°	wood	1964	1964	Temporary Built for Olympics		
Ichinomiya Velodrome	Aichi	400 m	33.5°/2.5°	asphalt	1950	2014			
Japan Cycle Sports Center	Shizuoka	250 m	45°/7°		1996?	2018	Rebuilt as JKA250		
Kagetsu-en Velodrome	Yokohama	400 m	30.5°/3.3°	asphalt	1950	2010			
Kanonji Keirin Velodrome	Kagawa	400 m	30.5°/2.5°	asphalt	1950	2012			
Karigane Velodrome	Nagano	333.3 m			1987	2013			
Kobe Keirin Velodrome	Hyogo	500 m			1949	1960	Rebuilt as Kobe Wing Stadium		
Korakuen Keirin velodrome	Tokyo	400 m			1949	1972	Rebuilt as Tokyo Dome		
Koshien Keirin Velodrome	Hyogo	400 m	28°		1949	2002			
Kyoto Keirin Velodrome	Kyoto	333.3 m			1949	1958			
Matsue Keirin Velodrome	Shimane	300 m	47°		1950	1953			
Matsumoto Velodrome	Nagano	400 m			1949	1951			
Moji Keirin Velodrome	Fukuoka	500 m			1950	2002			
Nishinomiya Stadium	Hyogo	333.3 m		wood	1949	2002			
Nagasaki Keirin Velodrome	Nagasaki	333.3 m			1949	1967			
Osaka Central Velodrome	Osaka	500 m			1950	1962	Rebuilt as Nagai Stadium		
Osaka Suminoe Velodrome	Osaka	500 m			1948	1964			
Otsu Keirin Velodrome	Shiga	500 m	25°/2.2°	asphalt	1950	2011			
Sapporo Keirin Velodrome	Sapporo	500 m			1949	1961	Rebuilt as Tsukisamu Gym		
Sendai Velodrome	Miyagi	400 m	31.3°		1952	2014			
Shinjo Cycle Sports Center	Yamagata	400 m			1975	2019			
Toyonaka Keirin Velodrome	Osaka	500 m			1950	1955			
Malaysia
Cheras Velodrome	Kuala Lumpur	330 m	unknown	concrete	1987	2017	1998 Commonwealth Games venue. Demolished after velodrome national build	3.111342°N 101.728571°E	
Philippines
Amoranto Velodrome	Quezon City	400 m	33°	concrete	1981	2024	Outdoor track. Demolished 2024 to be replaced by the Tagaytay track. Painted, lights, underpass.	14.629886°N 121.023292°E	
South Africa
Cape Town	Bellville Velodrome	250 m	43°	concrete		2026			
Western Holdings	Welkom, South Africa	485 m or 1,591 ft	25°	concrete			Once the most popular track in the country. Facilities destroyed in a hurricane in 1991 and never rebuilt again.		
President Steyn Mine Track	Welkom, South Africa	485 m or 1,591 ft	25°	concrete			Still existing, but no longer in use		
Harmony Gold Mine Track	Virginia, South Africa	485 m or 1,591 ft	25°	concrete			Still existing, but no longer in use		
Spain
Tirador	Palma de Mallorca	333.33 m or 1,093.6 ft		concrete			Outdoor track. Built in 1903, closed in 1973. Still existing, but no longer in use.		
Switzerland
Pontaise	Lausanne	250 m or 820 ft		concrete			No more in activity since 2011		
United Kingdom
England
Bootle Stadium	Bootle, Merseyside								
Butts Stadium	Coventry, West Midlands	402 m or 1,319 ft		asphalt			Built in 1879, fell out of use in the 1990s		
Catford Track	Catford	536 m or 1,759 ft		concrete					
Fallowfield Stadium	Fallowfield, Manchester	509 yards (465 m)	30˚	shale, later concrete			Opened May 1892. Was renamed the Reg Harris Stadium in 1955. Demolished in 1994.		
Gypsies Green	South Shields, Tyne and Wear	401 m or 1,316 ft		asphalt			Semi-derelict		
Harlow Track	Harlow, Essex	197 m or 646 ft	45˚	wood			Opened 11 September 1976, closed 3 November 1993		
Harvey Hadden Stadium	Bilborough Park, Nottingham	460 m or 1,509 ft		tarmac			Closed 2003		
Kirkby Sports Centre	Kirkby, Merseyside	485 m or 1,591 ft		asphalt			Built 1964. Last used 29 August 2007, demolished.		
North London Cycling Track	Wood Green, London	459 m or 1,506 ft							
Paddington Recreation Ground	Maida Vale, London			concrete			Demolished in 1987 to make way for a dog fouling area.		
Putney Velodrome	Putney, London	358 m or 1,175 ft		concrete			Opened 1 August 1891		
Saffron Lane sports centre	Leicester, Leicestershire	333 m or 1,093 ft	37˚	wood			Used for World Championships in 1970 and 1984 and national championships from the 1970s to the 1990s. Earlier plastic-coated concrete track given wood surface in 1978, fell into disrepair due to lack of funds after major events were moved to newly opened Manchester velodrome.		
Salford Stadium	Birmingham	402 m or 1,319 ft		tarmac			Opened 11 July 1951		
Southampton Velodrome	Southampton								
Memorial Athletic Grounds	West Ham, London								
	Kensal Rise, London								
LNWR Sports Ground	Wolverton, Milton Keynes						Hard track in use in the 1950s. Last visible derelict sections demolished circa 2009.		
Scotland
Meadowbank Stadium	Edinburgh	250 m or 820 ft		wood			Built for the 1970 British Commonwealth Games and used again in the 1986 Commonwealth Games, the outdoor track was demolished in 2018.		
Grangemouth Sports Stadium	Grangemouth, Falkirk						Circa 1966–1996		
Celtic Park	Glasgow						Circa 1892–early 20th century. Hosted 1897 World Cycling Championships.		
Wales
Taff Vale Park	Treforest, Rhondda Cynon Taff						Built before 1908, banking still exists covered in grass, surrounding a playing field behind Broadway		
Isle of Man
Nivison Stadium	Onchan, Isle of Man	400 m or 1,312 ft		asphalt			Outdoor track, built 1951		
Northern Ireland
Wallace Park	Lisburn						Opened in 1953. Fell into disrepair, partially demolished		
United States
Boulder Indoor Cycling	Boulder, Colorado	142 m or 466 ft	45	wood			Opened December 2008; ceased operations April 2012. The velodrome was disassembled.		
Dorais Velodrome	Detroit, Michigan	325 m or 1,066 ft	24˚/8˚	concrete			Outdoor track, completed 1969, hosted National Championships in 1969		
Bloomer Park Velodrome	Rochester,Michigan	200 m or 660 ft	44˚	wood			Outdoor track, completed 2002, demolished in 2025.		
Chicago Velo Campus	Chicago, Illinois	166 m or 545 ft					Outdoor interim track, built in 2011. Permanently closed in July 2016.		
National Sports Center Velodrome	Blaine, Minnesota (near Minneapolis)	250 m	43˚	wood			Outdoor, Built in 1990. Officially Closed 2019		
Olympic Velodrome	Carson, California	333.3 m or 1,094 ft		concrete			Outdoor track, built for the 1984 Summer Olympics. Completed in 1981. Seating for 2,500 spectators. Demolished in 2003 and replaced with Dignity Health Sports Park, including the ADT Event Center.		
Stone Mountain Velodrome	Stone Mountain Park, Georgia	250 m or 820 ft	42˚/13˚	polymer-wood			Outdoor track, built for the 1996 Summer Olympics. The velodrome site was restored to a songbird habitat in 2003. Track was sold, and moved to the Bromont Velodrome in Quebec, Canada.		
The Superdrome	Frisco, Texas (near Dallas)	250 m	44˚	wood	1998	2017	Outdoor		
East Hartford Velodrome	East Hartford, Connecticut (near Hartford)			wood	1926	1929	Outdoor		

== List of oldest cycling tracks and velodromes ==
This list exposes the oldest tracks around the world that are still existing today.

N.	Velodrome	City	Year	Length	Surface	Notes	In use	Location
1	Preston Park Velodrome	Brighton, England	1877	579.03 m	tarmac	outdoor	Yes	50.5029°N 00.0852°E
2	Velodrom TJ Favorit Brno	Brno, Czech Republic	1889	400 m	concrete	outdoor	Yes	49.184660°N 16.579075°E
3	Herne Hill Velodrome	London, England	1891	450 m	tarmac	outdoor	Yes	51.2704°N 00.0529°E
4	Richmondshire Velodrome	Richmond, England	1892	364 m	grass	outdoor	No	54.404998°N 01.740925°E
5	Vélodrome de Vincennes	Paris, France	1894	500 m	concrete	outdoor	Yes	48.4934°N 02.2441°E
6	Loudun Velodrome	Loudun, France	1895	185 m	concrete	outdoor	Yes	47.008434°N 00.076897°E
7	Vélodrome des Alliers	Angouleme, France	1895	333.33 m	concrete	outdoor	Yes	45.639153°N 00.126388°E
8	Turquet de la Boisserie	Senlis, France	1896	333.33 m	concrete	outdoor	Yes	49.208863°N 02.576555°E
9	Jacques Anquetil Velodrome	Saint-Omer, France	1896	412 m	concrete	outdoor	Yes	50.743669°N 02.250982°E
10	Millenáris Sporttelep	Budapest, Hungary	1896	412 m	concrete	outdoor	Yes	47.3022°N 19.0541°E
11	Lurcy-Lévis Vélodrome	Lurcy-Lévis, France	1897	250 m	concrete	outdoor	Yes	46.734663°N 02.940161°E
12	Carmarthen Park	Carmarthen, Wales	1900	405.38 m	concrete	outdoor	Yes	51.854198°N 04.313400°E
13	Tirador	Palma de Mallorca, Spain	1903	333.33 m	concrete	outdoor	No	39.578678°N 02.644325°E
14	Reichelsdorsfer Keller	Nuremberg, Germany	1904	400 m	concrete	outdoor	Yes	49.3666°N 11.0452°E
15	Radrennbahn Forst	Forst, Germany	1906	400 m	concrete	outdoor	Yes	51.4344°N 14.3719°E
16	Forest Town Welfare	Mansfield, England	1908	402 m	tarmac	outdoor	Yes	53.152203°N 01.164346°E

The Andreasried Velodrome (Erfurt, Germany) was originally built in 1885 but was entirely redeveloped in 2006–2007. This one is in fact a new track.
