= Halesowen Velodrome =

- Location: Halesowen, England, United Kingdom
- Surface: Asphalt
- Field size: 400 m (440 yd) track

Construction
- Renovated: 1992, 2004

Halesowen Velodrome is an outdoor velodrome located at Manor Abbey Stadium in Halesowen, in the Metropolitan Borough of Dudley, in the West Midlands, England. The 400m cycle track runs around the perimeter of a 350m athletics training track built for Halesowen Athletics Club.

The athletics club was formed in 1939, and joined forces with local cyclists to form Halesowen Athletic & Cycling Club. During the Second World War, the club purchased former marshland to create Manor Abbey Stadium. Due to continued flooding problems, the track was raised by one metre during the 1960s; it was resurfaced in 1992, and again in 2004 by Tarmac Limited (with grant aid from British Cycling).

During the summer months, the velodrome hosts a Friday night track league. Jessica Varnish is one notable rider to have developed her skills at the velodrome as a member of the Halesowen club.

== See also ==
- List of cycling tracks and velodromes
