= Tachikawa Velodrome =

Velodrome in Tachikawa, Tokyo

Coordinates: 35°42′10″N 139°25′21″E

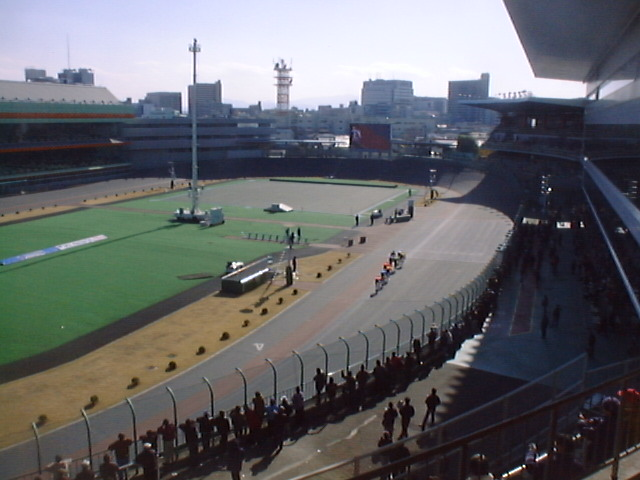
Tachikawa Velodrome

Tachikawa Velodrome (立川競輪場, Tachikawa Keirinjō) is a velodrome located in Tachikawa, Tokyo that conducts pari-mutuel Keirin racing - one of Japan's four authorized "Public Sports" (公営競技, kōei kyōgi) where gambling is permitted. Its Keirin identification number for betting purposes is 28# (28 sharp).

Tachikawa's oval is 400 meters in circumference. A typical keirin race of 2,025 meters consists of five laps around the course.

The Tokyo-based Tachikawa is one of professional keirin racing's major velodromes, often hosting its biggest race, the Keirin Grand Prix.

== See also ==
- List of cycling tracks and velodromes
