= Glenmore Velodrome =

Bicycle racing track in Calgary, Alberta

- Interactive map of Glenmore Velodrome
- Location: 5300 19 St SW, Calgary, Alberta
- Coordinates: 51.005709°N 114.103100°W
- Owner: Calgary, Alberta
- Operator: Calgary Bicycle Track League
- Field size: 400 meter oval

Construction
- Built: 1974

The Glenmore Velodrome is a 400-metre outdoor bicycle racing track in Calgary, Alberta. It is operated by the Calgary Bicycle Track League, and was built in 1974. The track surface is concrete, with 29 degree banking in the corners. It hosted the 1975 National Track Championships.

== See also ==
- List of cycling tracks and velodromes
