= Kawasaki Velodrome =

Velodrome in Kawasaki, Kanagawa, Japan

Coordinates: 35°31′42″N 139°42′39″E

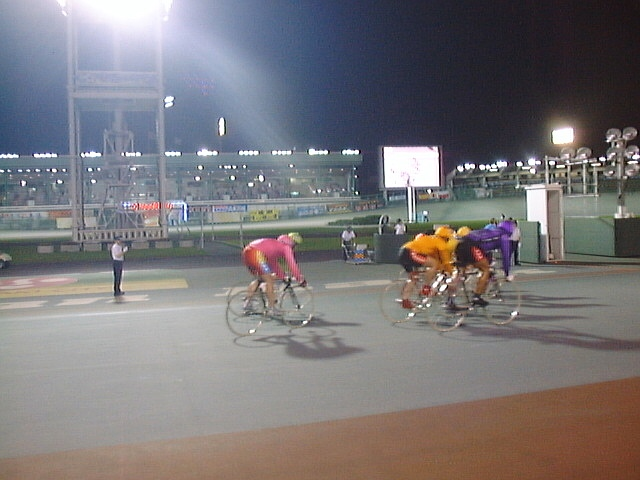
Kawasaki Velodrome at night

Kawasaki Velodrome (川崎競輪場, Kawasaki Keirinjyō) is a velodrome located in Kawasaki, Kanagawa that conducts pari-mutuel Keirin racing - one of Japan's four authorized "Public Sports" (公営競技, kōei kyōgi) where gambling is permitted. Its Keirin identification number for betting purposes is 34# (34 sharp).

Kawasaki's oval is 400 meters in circumference. A typical keirin race of 2,025 meters consists of five laps around the course.

Kawasaki Vélodrome is most convenient velodrome from Haneda airport in Tokyo.

Regular free shuttle buses run from Kawasaki Railway Station East-Gate (bus stop No.21) to the Vélodrome with a journey time of around 5 minutes. Buses run every 20 minutes from 10:00am to 15:00.

== See also ==
- List of cycling tracks and velodromes
- Sports betting
