= Jerry Baker Memorial Velodrome =

Velodrome in Redmond, Washington

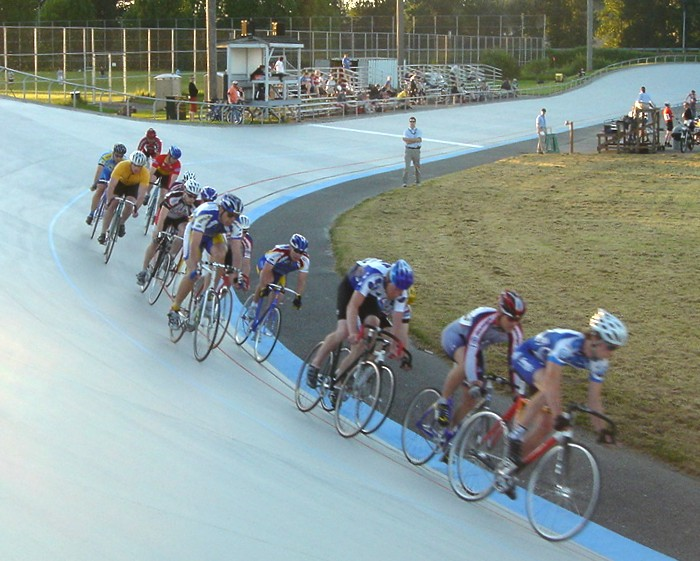
- Interactive map of Jerry Baker Memorial Velodrome
- Former names: Marymoor Velodrome
- Location: 6046 W Lake Sammamish Parkway NE, Redmond, Washington
- Coordinates: 47.665759°N 122.112079°W
- Owner: King County
- Operator: Marymoor Velodrome Association
- Capacity: 6 sets of bleachers
- Surface: Concrete
- Field size: 400m oval track

Construction
- Built: 1974
- Opened: 1975
- Renovated: 2005
- Cost: $176,000

Tenants
- Marymoor Velodrome Association and King County Parks

Website
- velodrome.org

The Jerry Baker Memorial Velodrome is a 1,300-foot (400 m) outdoor bicycle racing track located in Redmond, Washington. It was built in 1974 and was resurfaced in 2005. The current track racing surface is 400 meters in total length, with a maximum slope of 23 degrees in the corners. As such, the "Gentle Giant" is one of the longest in the country. Currently operated by the Marymoor Velodrome Association, the track hosted the US Master's Track National Championships in 2014. It also hosted the USA Junior Cycling Nationals in 2024 and 2025.

== See also ==
- List of cycling tracks and velodromes
