= Chiba Velodrome =

Velodrome in Chiba City, Japan

Coordinates: 35°37′19″N 140°6′53″E

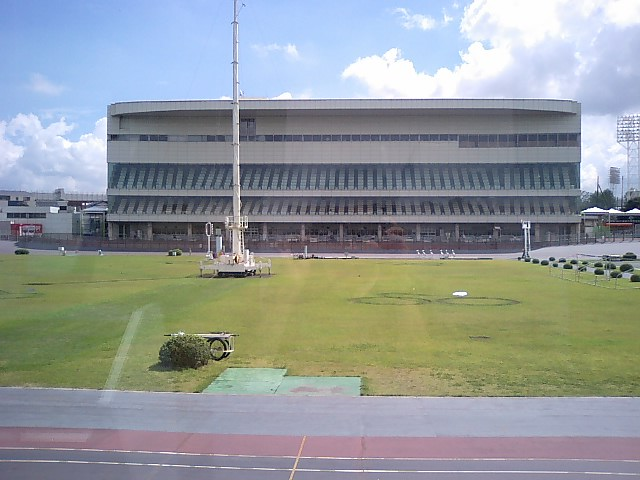
Chiba Velodrome

Chiba Velodrome (千葉競輪場, Chiba Keirinjyō) is a velodrome located in Chiba City that conducts pari-mutuel Keirin racing - one of Japan's four authorized "Public Sports" (公営競技, kōei kyōgi) where gambling is permitted. Its Keirin identification number for betting purposes is 32# (32 sharp).

Chiba's oval is 500 meters in circumference. A typical keirin race of 2,000 meters consists of four laps around the course.

== See also ==
- List of cycling tracks and velodromes
