= Aomori Velodrome =

Velodrome in Aomori, Japan

Coordinates: 40.797177°N 140.665534°E

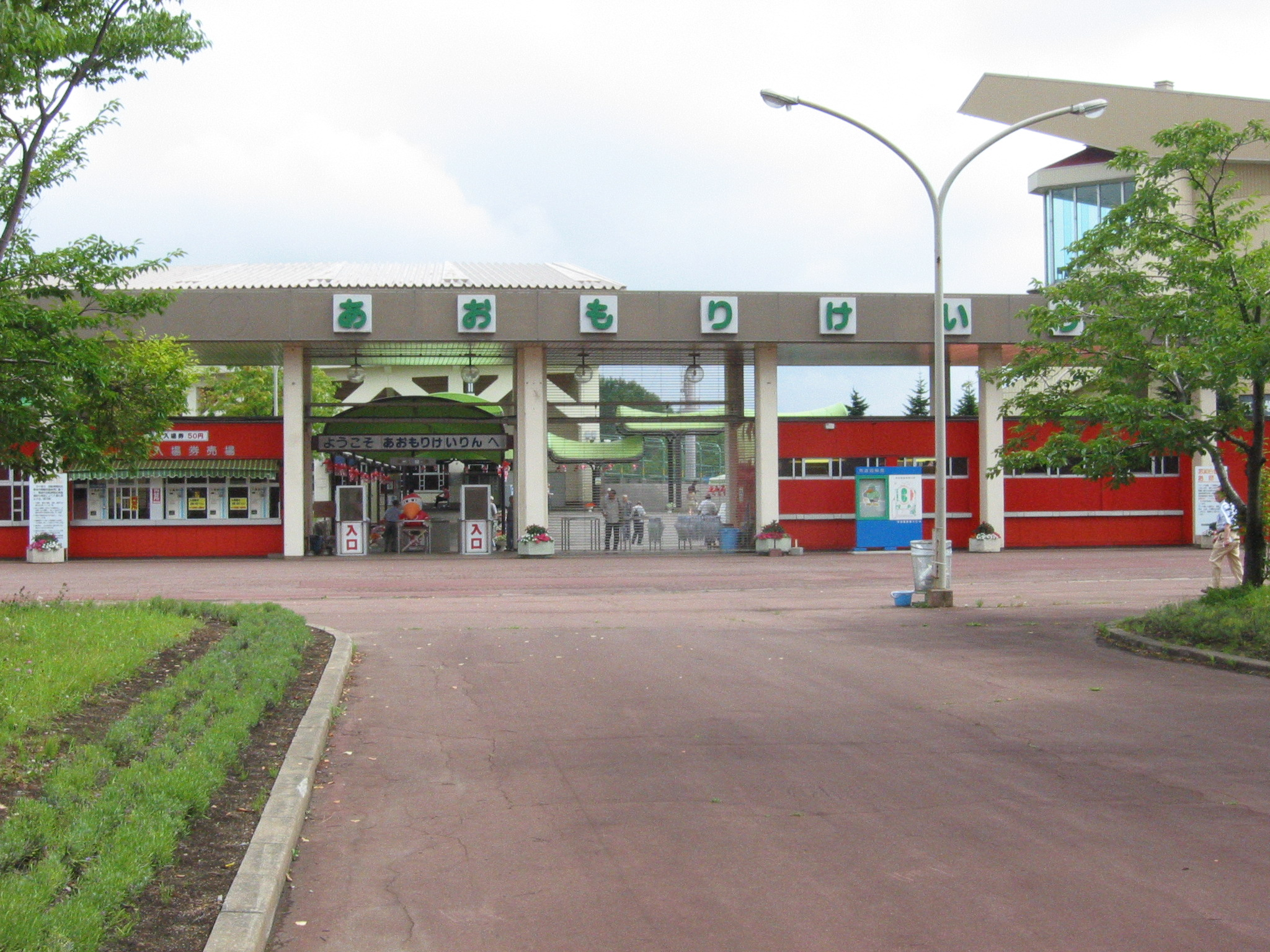
- Interactive map of Aomori Velodrome
- Location: Aomori, Aomori, Japan
- Owner: Aomori city
- Operator: Nippon Totor

Construction
- Opened: June 24, 1950

Website
- http://www.aomorikeirin.com/

Aomori Velodrome (青森競輪場, Aomori Keirinjyō), also known as Jomon Bank Aomori Velodrome, is a velodrome located in Aomori City that conducts pari-mutuel Keirin racing - one of Japan's four authorized "Public Sports" (公営競技, kōei kyōgi) where gambling is permitted. Its Keirin identification number for betting purposes is 12# (12 sharp).

Aomori's oval is 400 meters in circumference. A typical keirin race of 2,025 meters consists of five laps around the course.

Due to its location in the northern part of Tohoku, races at Aomori Velodrome are held during warm weather months, from April to November.

== See also ==
- List of cycling tracks and velodromes
