= Vélodrome Caisse Populaire de Dieppe =

Bicycle racing track in Dieppe, New Brunswick

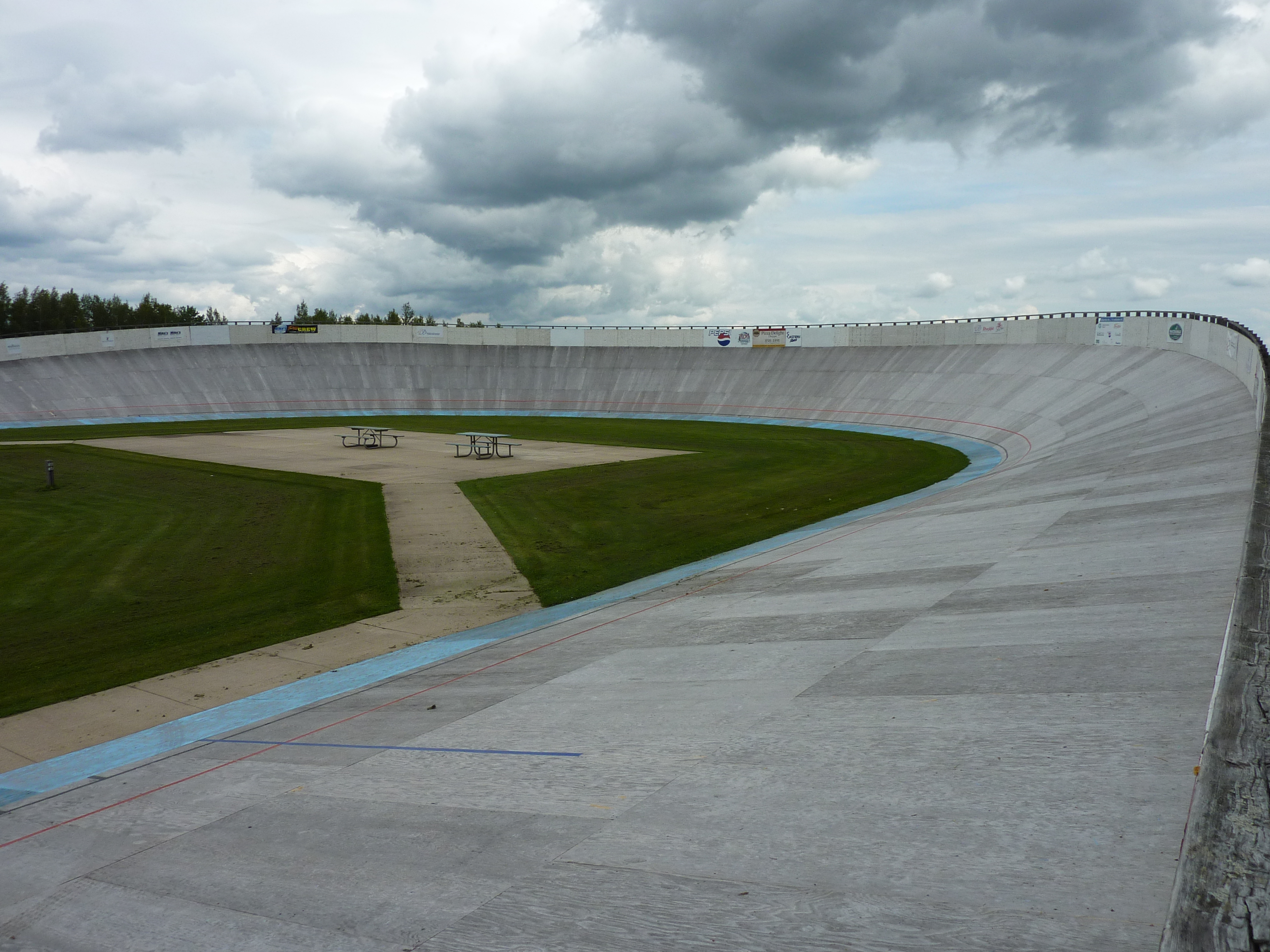
- Vélodrome Caisse Populaire de Dieppe (2014)
- Interactive map of Vélodrome Caisse Populaire de Dieppe
- Location: 200 Du Parc Promenade, Dieppe, NB
- Coordinates: 46.069510°N 64.711351°W
- Field size: 250 meter oval

Construction
- Opened: July 2001

The Vélodrome Caisse Populaire de Dieppe was a 250-meter bicycle racing track located in Dieppe, New Brunswick, Canada, which opened in July 2001. It was the National Cycling Centre for Atlantic Canada. The track was found to be beyond repair when inspected in spring 2018 and it was subsequently demolished.

In 2006 and 2007, it was the host for the Tim Hortons National Track Championships.

== See also ==
- List of cycling tracks and velodromes
