= Matsudo Velodrome =

Velodrome in Matsudo, Chiba, Japan

Coordinates: 35°48′15″N 139°54′40″E

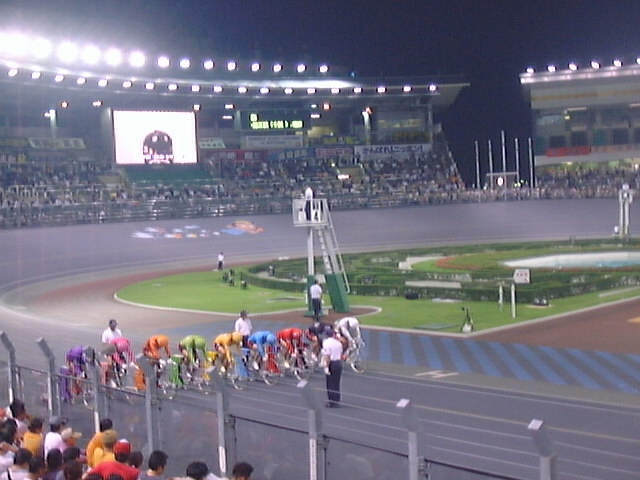
Matsudo Velodrome at night

Matsudo Velodrome (松戸競輪場, Matsudo Keirinjyō) is a velodrome located in Matsudo, Chiba that conducts pari-mutuel Keirin racing - one of Japan's four authorized "Public Sports" (公営競技, kōei kyōgi) where gambling is permitted. Its Keirin identification number for betting purposes is 31# (31 sharp).

Matsudo's oval is 333 meters in circumference. A typical keirin race of 2,015 meters consists of six laps around the course.

== See also ==
- List of cycling tracks and velodromes
