= Wind-Del Velodrome =

Bicycle racing track in Ontario, Canada

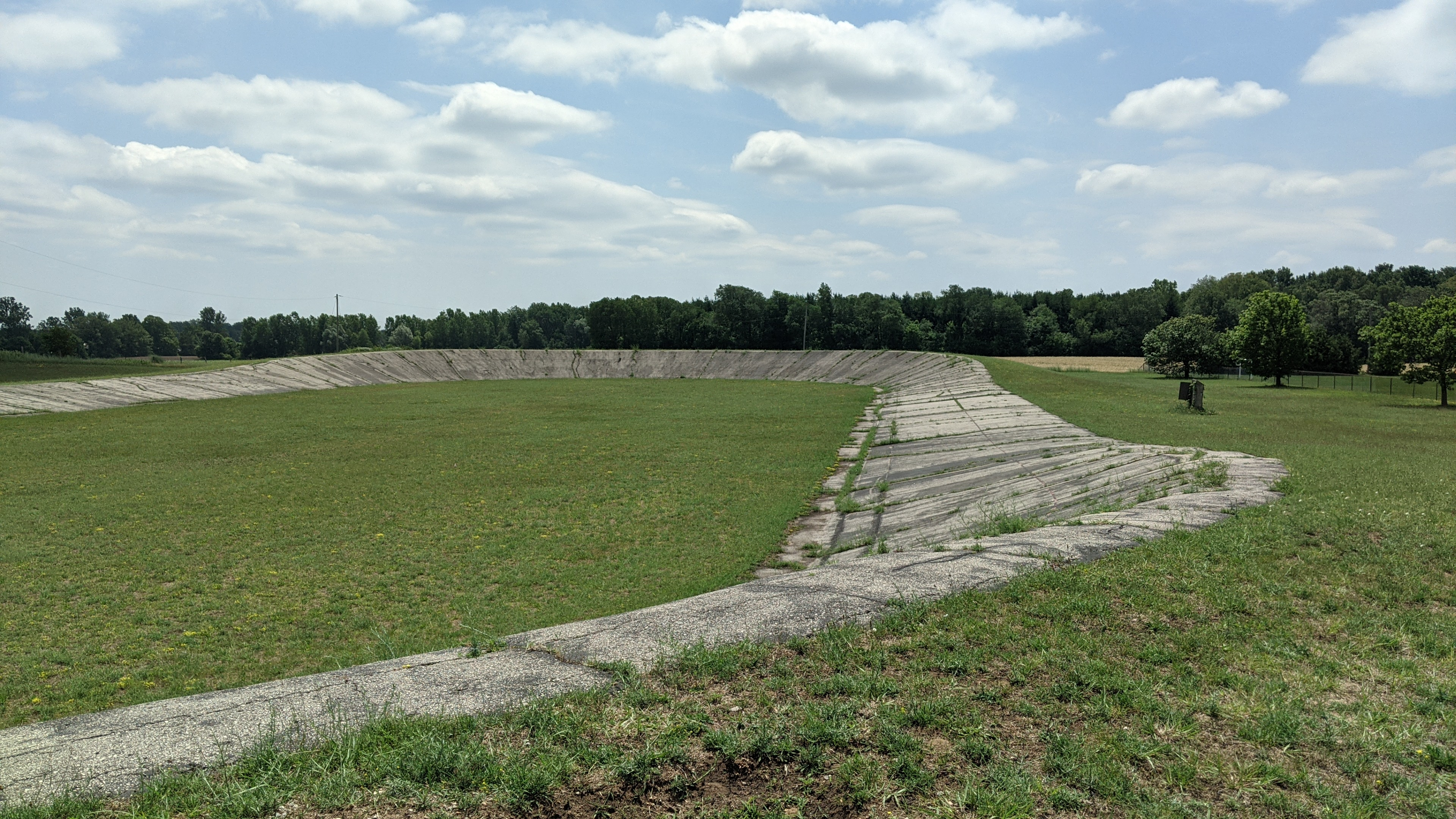
- Wind-Del Velodrome in 2021
- Interactive map of Wind-Del Velodrome
- Location: 3178 Regional Rd 25, Windham Centre, ON
- Coordinates: 42.910266°N 80.4202200°W
- Field size: 250 meter oval

Construction
- Built: 1972

The Wind-Del Velodrome is a 250 m (820 ft) outdoor bicycle racing track located in Windham Centre, Ontario, and is one of only three velodromes in the province. The surface is asphalt, and the corners are banked 13 degrees. It was constructed in 1972 by Belgian immigrants to the area. Though the track is not often used, funds for demolition are not available. In addition to hosting the 2001 Ontario Provincial Track Championships, it has been used as an amphitheater and host for recumbent bicycle races. With the opening of the Mattamy National Cycling Centre in Milton, Ontario, proposals have been made to upgrade the Win-Del Velodrome and use it as a training facility.

== See also ==
- List of cycling tracks and velodromes
