= Cleveland velodrome =

Velodrome in Cleveland, Ohio, U.S.

Cleveland Velodrome
- Interactive map of Cleveland Velodrome
- Location: Cleveland, Ohio, U.S.
- Coordinates: 41°28′18.3″N 81°39′16.2″W
- Surface: Wood
- Field size: 166 m (182 yd) track

Construction
- Opened: August 2012

Website
- http://clevelandvelodrome.org

The Cleveland Velodrome is an open-air velodrome in Cleveland, Ohio, U.S. The 166 m (182 yd) track has 50 degree banked turns. The track opened in August 2012. For the 2018 season, the track was renovated.

== See also ==
- List of cycling tracks and velodromes
