= Toride Velodrome =

Sporting venue in Japan

Coordinates: 35°54′5″N 140°3′25″E

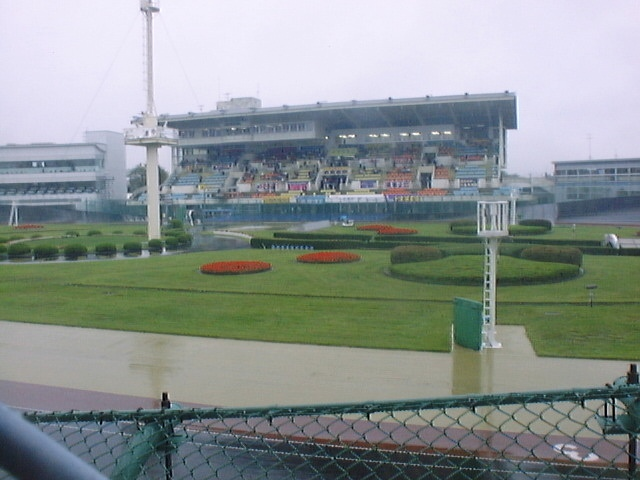
Toride Velodrome

Toride Velodrome (取手競輪場, Toride Keirinjyō) is a velodrome located in Toride, Ibaraki, that conducts pari-mutuel keirin racing - one of Japan's four authorized "public sports" (公営競技, kōei kyōgi) where gambling is permitted. Its keirin identification number for betting purposes is 23# (23 sharp).

Toride's oval is 400 meters in circumference. A typical keirin race of 2,025 meters consists of five laps around the course.

Horse races were once held here as Toride Racecourse, but due to the boom in bicycle racing in the 1950s, horse racing events declined, so the facility was changed to a bicycle racing track. Traces of the old racecourse, which opened on February 25, 1950, can still be seen in the current parking lot.

== See also ==
- List of cycling tracks and velodromes
