= Klaipėda Velodrome =

Bicycle track and football stadium in Klaipėda, Lithuania

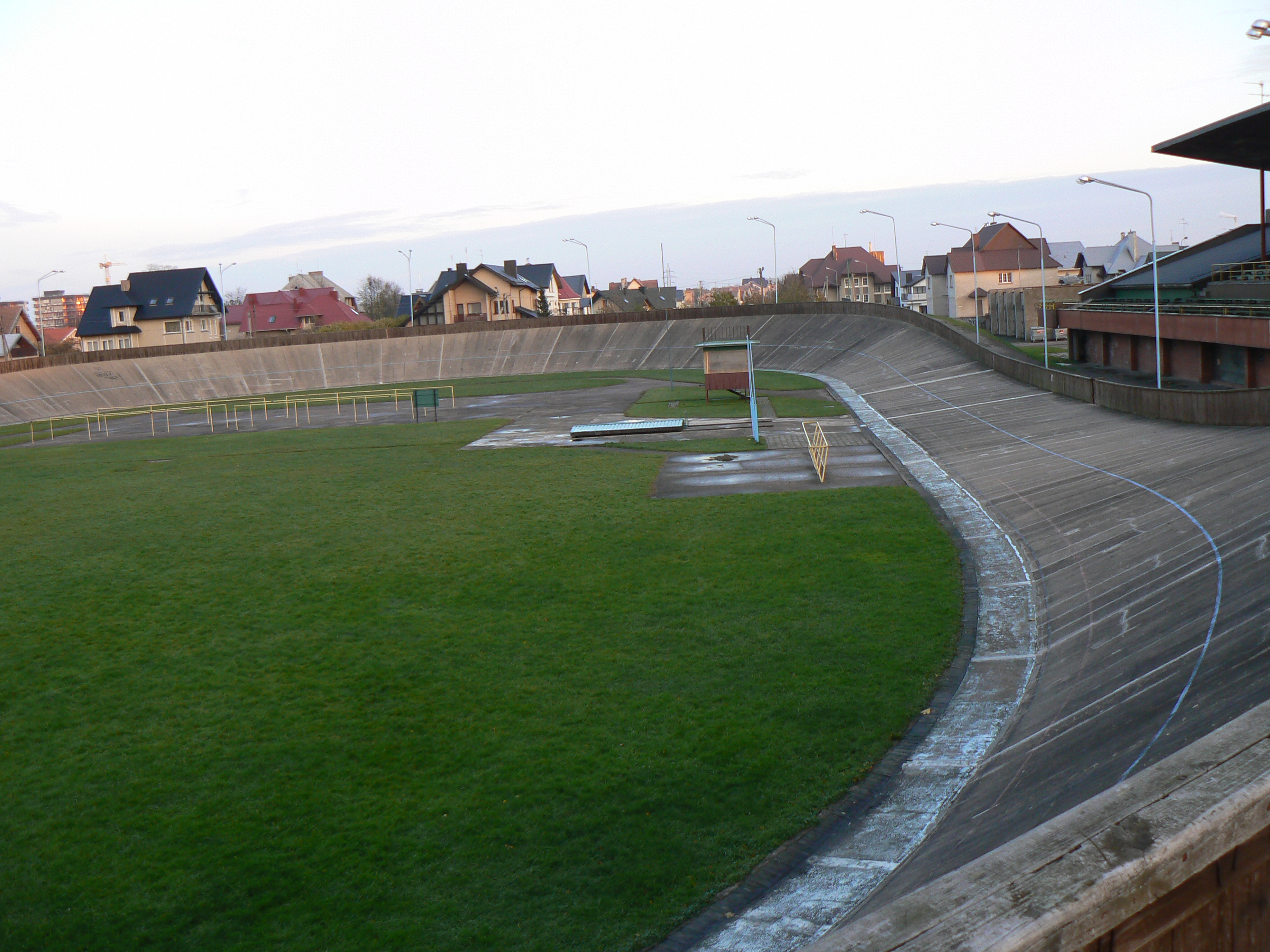
- Interactive map of Klaipėda Velodrome
- Coordinates: 55°43′57″N 21°8′5″E
- Surface: concrete (track)

Construction
- Opened: 1979

The Klaipėda Velodrome (Lithuanian: Klaipėdos velodromas) is a velodrome in Klaipėda, Lithuania. Opened in 1979, it is one of the oldest and most historically significant velodromes in the country. The facility is managed by the Klaipėda Body Culture and Recreation Center and has served as a major training ground for generations of Lithuanian cyclists.

== History ==
The history of velodromes in Klaipėda dates back to 1933, when a primitive concrete track was constructed during the interwar period by German clubs. However, this early facility was not accessible to Lithuanian cyclists, and following World War II, it became unusable due to poor condition.

In 1978–1979, a major reconstruction was carried out based on the design by architect Zigmas Bernardas Rutkauskas. The new facility included a 333.33-meter outdoor concrete track, becoming one of the most modern cycling venues in the Soviet Union at the time. For decades, it served as the base for the national men's cycling team from Klaipėda, coached by Narsutis Dumbauskas.

In 2020, the track was fenced off due to safety concerns, limiting access to only supervised training sessions for youth athletes.

== See also ==
- List of cycling tracks and velodromes
