= Keiokaku Velodrome =

Velodrome in Tokyo

Coordinates: 35.643238°N 139.533625°E

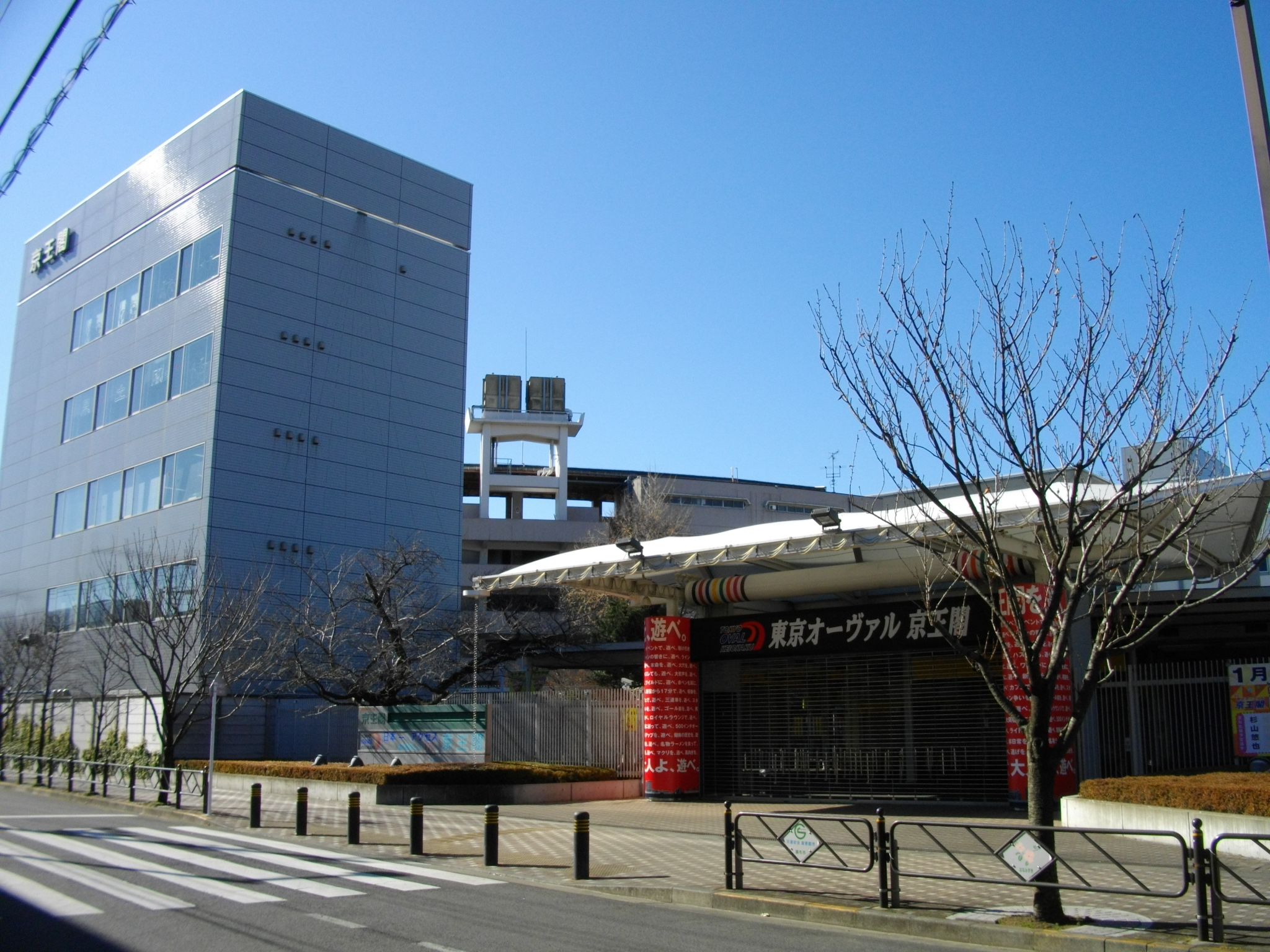
- Entrance to Keiokaku Velodrome
- Established in: 1949
- Race course: 400m
- Agari time record (back stretch to finishing line): 10.4s set by Shane Perkins, October 14th 2015

Major events in 2015
- 68th Japan Keirin Championship (第６８回日本選手権競輪)
- Keirin Grand Prix 2015 (ＫＥＩＲＩＮグランプリ２０１５)

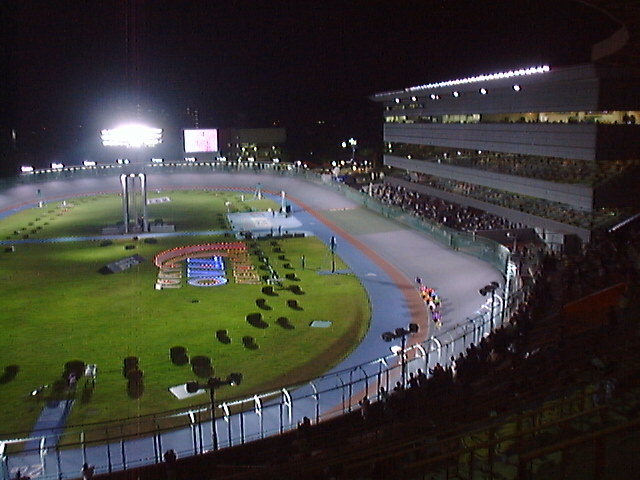
Night Racing at Keiokaku

Keiokaku Velodrome (京王閣競輪場, Keiōkaku Keirinjyō), also known as TOKYO OVAL KEIOKAKU, is a velodrome located in Chōfu, Tokyo that conducts pari-mutuel Keirin racing - one of Japan's four authorized "Public Sports" (公営競技, kōei kyōgi) where gambling is permitted. Its Keirin identification number for betting purposes is 27# (27 sharp).

Keiokaku's oval is 400 meters in circumference. A typical keirin race of 2,025 meters consists of five laps around the course.

== See also ==
- List of cycling tracks and velodromes
