= Tabriz Cycling Track =

Cycling venue in Tabriz, Iran

Coordinates: 38.029643°N 46.292755°E

Tabriz Cycling Track is a 250 m-long (820 ft) concrete track in Tabriz, in Iran's East Azerbaijan province. The cycling track is next to the Sahand Stadium and is part of Tabriz Olympic village project. It was officially opened in February 2011.

== See also ==
- List of cycling tracks and velodromes
