= Quaid e Azam International Cycling Velodrome =

Velodrome in Lahore, Pakistan

Coordinates: 31°30′43″N 74°19′48″E

The Quaid e Azam International Cycling Velodrome is a velodrome in Lahore, Pakistan; it is the only velodrome in Pakistan and was constructed in 1954, though plans exist to build a velodrome in Peshawar. However, its condition had deteriorated to the point that by 2011, Pakistan's Senate Standing Committee on Sports had become concerned about its continuing suitability.

== Facilities ==
The Quaid e Azam International Cycling Velodrome is a 333.33 meter long concrete surface velodrome, which has attracted criticism, as present international standards require a 250m or 500m long wooden surface. The velodrome is of an outdoor configuration, having a grandstand seating capacity of 3,000. The venue is suitable for cycling events.

== Events and usage ==
The Quaid e Azam International Cycling Velodrome has hosted national and international events and has been used as a training camp for track cycling teams. It is a popular destination for national and international track cycling teams looking for a unique environment for a training camp prior to competitions. It hosted the 2017 Pakistan national track cycling championships:

- November: Male Track National Cycling Championships
- December: Female Track National Cycling Championships

== See also ==
- List of cycling tracks and velodromes
