= Kagetsu-en Velodrome =

Velodrome in Yokohama, Japan

Coordinates: 35.501557°N 139.668717°E

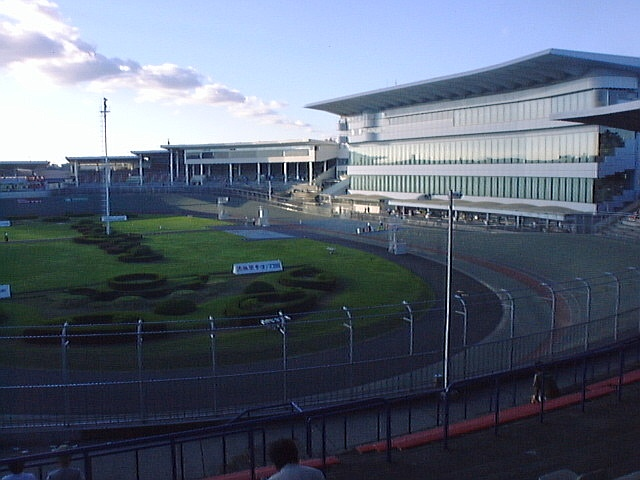
- Interactive map of Kagetsu-en Velodrome
- Location: Yokohama, Japan
- Owner: Kagetsu-en Kanko
- Operator: Kagetsu-en Kanko

Construction
- Opened: 1950
- Closed: March 31, 2010

Tenant
- Keirin

Kagetsu-en Velodrome (花月園競輪場, Kagetsuen Keirinjyō) was a velodrome located in Yokohama, Japan, that hosted pari-mutuel Keirin racing, one of Japan's four authorized "Public Sports" (公営競技, kōei kyōgi) where gambling is permitted.

Kagetsu-en Velodrome featured an oval track with a 400-meter circumference. A typical keirin race, which covered a distance of 2,025 meters, consisted of five laps around the track.

Kagetsu-en Velodrome officially closed on March 31, 2010.

== See also ==
- List of cycling tracks and velodromes
