= Velódromo Panamericano =

Velodrome in Tlaquepaque, Guadalajara, Mexico

The Pan American Velodrome is a Velodrome located in Tlaquepaque, near Guadalajara, Mexico. It hosted the track cycling events at the 2011 Pan American Games. It has a capacity of 1,932, a wooden track and has been described as one of the best velodromes in Latin America. It gained UCI approval in October 2011 after removing two pillars to improve sight lines. The Velodrome is approximately 1550 metres above sea level

After the games it will be used as high performance training center.

== See also ==
- Cycling at the 2011 Pan American Games
- List of cycling tracks and velodromes
