= Giordana Velodrome =

Cycling track in Rock Hill, South Carolina

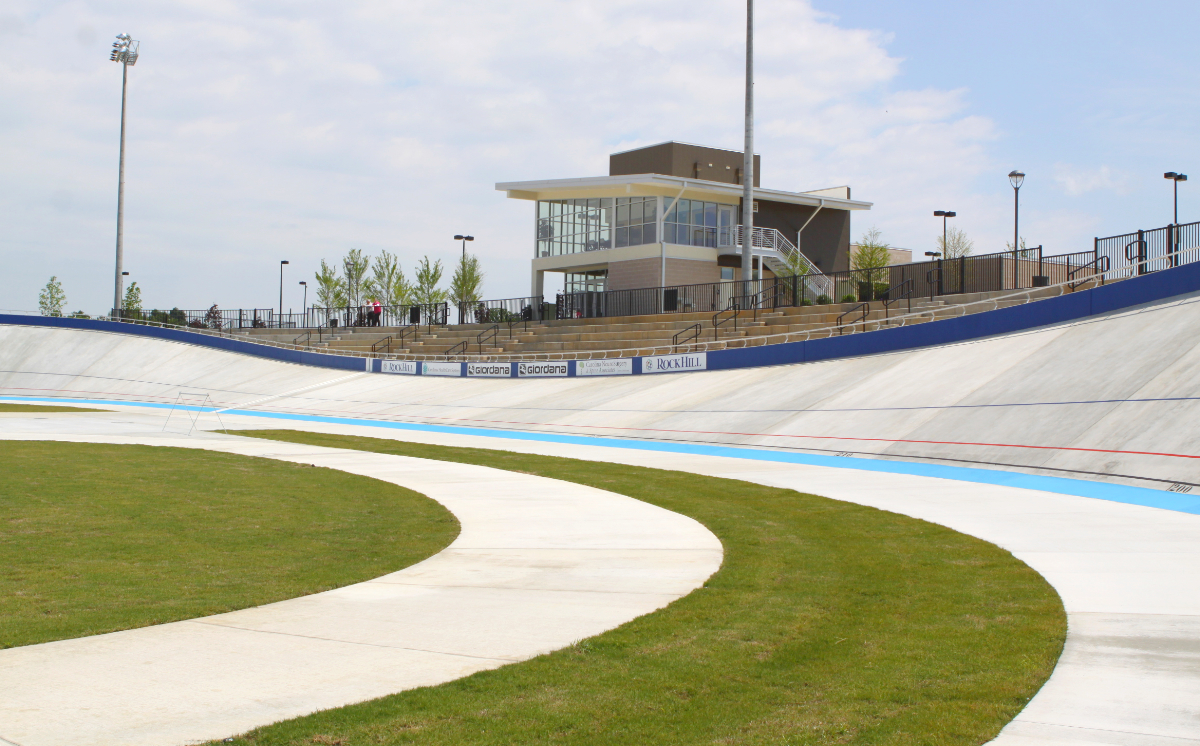
- The Giordana Velodrome
- Interactive map of Giordana Velodrome
- Location: Rock Hill, South Carolina, United States
- Coordinates: 34.976426°N 80.978138°W
- Surface: Concrete
- Field size: 250 m (270 yd) track

Construction
- Opened: March 2012

Giordana Velodrome is a cycling track in Rock Hill, South Carolina, United States. It opened in March 2012.

The 250-meter track is made of concrete with a 42.5 degree embankment in the corners and a 17 degree embankment on the front and back straights. The velodrome is part of the Rock Hill Outdoor Center. U.S. national track cycling championships were held there in 2012 and 2013. The velodrome was designed by Ralph Schürmann, a cycling track architect from Münster, Germany.

Giordana Velodrome is going to be the center of a recreational area, of which the construction is still in progress. Additional cycling venues, athletic fields, parks, gardens and greenspace are planned nearby.

== See also ==
- List of cycling tracks and velodromes
