= Utsunomiya Velodrome =

Velodrome in Utsunomiya, Tochigi, Japan

Coordinates: 36.572454°N 139.884298°E

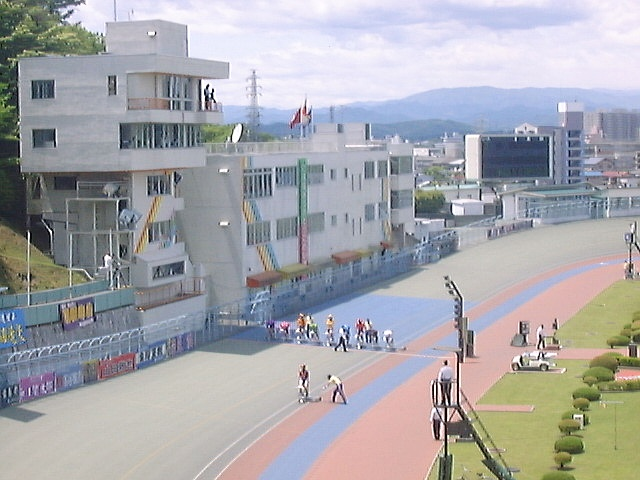
- Utsunomiya Velodrome. The finish line was moved to the other side of the course when construction of the new grandstand was completed in 2009
- Interactive map of Utsunomiya Velodrome
- Location: Utsunomiya, Tochigi, Japan

Construction
- Opened: 2009

Utsunomiya Velodrome (宇都宮競輪場, Utsunomiya Keirinjyō) is a velodrome located in Utsunomiya, Tochigi that conducts pari-mutuel Keirin racing - one of Japan's four authorized "Public Sports" (公営競技, kōei kyōgi) where gambling is permitted. Nicknamed "Kaze no Wonderland" (風のワンダーランド, Kaze no Uondarando; lit. The Wonderland of Wind), its Keirin identification number for betting purposes is 24# (24 sharp).

Utsunomiya's oval is 500 meters in circumference. A typical keirin race of 2,025 meters consists of four laps around the course.

Utsunomiya Velodrome is the home track of Yūichirō Kamiyama, a 21-year Keirin veteran and one of the sport's best competitors with 16 GI (Grade 1) victories in his career.

== See also ==
- List of cycling tracks and velodromes
