= Asheville Velodrome =

Outdoor cycling arena in North Carolina, US

The Asheville Velodrome, located in Asheville, North Carolina, is an outdoor velodrome with an inside track for pedestrians. It is nicknamed as “the Mellowdrome." It is situated inside a 32-acre park, named "Carrier Park," and runs along the French Broad River. In 2011, a full track was donated by the Carrier Family to the City of Asheville. The Mellowdrome is an official "velodrome" recognized by USA Cycling.

In 1900, Edwin Carrier constructed the "Carrier Race Track and Fair Grounds" as a horse racing track. Later, in 1960, a new racetrack was built on the same site, which operated as the "Asheville Speedway" until 1999. In 1998, the City of Asheville acquired the property.

The Mellowdrome holds 300 km, 500 km, and 300-mile outdoor track races. The track is open to all bicycles, both fixed gear track bikes, and bicycles with gears and brakes due to its gentle banking. In late 2017, the city started the "Carrier Park Velodrome Safety Project" to include lights, an inside track, and a new concrete surface. The Mellowdrome reopened in March 2018.

== See also ==
- List of cycling tracks and velodromes
