= Noguchi =

Noguchi (野口 lit. "field entrance") is a Japanese surname. Notable people with the surname include:

- Akira Noguchi (野口明), baseball player, older brother of Jirō Noguchi
- Akiyo Noguchi (野口啓代), Japanese climber who won multiple bouldering world cups
- Ayaka Noguchi, Japanese footballer
- Chiyo Noguchi (野口智代), Award-winning Japanese Athlete
- Fujio Noguchi (野口富士男), novelist
- Goro Noguchi (野口五郎), singer and actor
- Haruchika Noguchi (野口晴哉), the founder of Seitai
- Hideyo Noguchi (野口英世), bacteriologist, discoverer of the agent of syphilis, formerly depicted on the ¥1000 note
- Hiroshi Noguchi (野口裕司), football player
- Isamu Noguchi (野口勇), Japanese-American sculptor
- Jirō Noguchi (野口二郎), baseball player, younger brother of Akira Noguchi
- Ken Noguchi (野口健), alpinist
- Kenji Noguchi (野口健司), member of the Shinsengumi
- Koji Noguchi (野口幸司), football player
- Kyō Noguchi
- Machiko Noguchi (野口真千子), protagonist of the Aliens vs. Predator novel series
- Masaaki Noguchi (野口正明), baseball player
- Mika Noguchi (野口美佳), businesswoman
- Mizuki Noguchi (野口みずき), athlete
- Motoo Noguchi, Japanese judge
- Nawoko Noguchi, also known as Naoko Ken (研ナオコ), singer, actress and television personality
- Neisai Noguchi (野口寧斎), poet
- Osamu Noguchi (野口修), founder of Japanese kickboxing
- Rio Noguchi (born 1998), Japanese tennis player
- Ryuji Noguchi (野口 竜司; born 1995), Japanese rugby union player
- Ryu Noguchi (野口竜), manga artist and designer
- Shigeki Noguchi (野口茂樹), baseball player
- Shitagau Noguchi (野口遵), businessman
- Soichi Noguchi (野口聡一), astronaut
- Susumu Noguchi
- Tatsuhiko Noguchi (野口 竜彦; born 1997), Japanese footballer
- Thomas Noguchi (トーマス野口), Japanese-American coroner for Los Angeles County
- Toshihiro Noguchi (野口寿浩), baseball player
- Ujo Noguchi (野口雨情), author
- Yasutada Noguchi (野口安忠), athlete
- Yataro Noguchi (野口弥太郎), painter
- Yone Noguchi (野口米次郎), poet and father of Isamu Noguchi
- Yoshiyuki Noguchi (野口祥順), baseball player
- Yukio Noguchi (野口悠紀雄), economist
- Yuri Noguchi (のぐちゆり), voice actress

As a first name :

- Noguchi Yuka, Japanese woman educator for preschool education

== See also ==
- Noguchi Museum, displaying works of Isamu Noguchi
- 5734 Noguchi, asteroid
- Okinawa woodpecker (noguchigera)
