= List of boxing families =

This is a list of boxing families with two or more notable boxers. Many families have had multiple members become famous in the sport of boxing, with some having held multiple world titles. While this does not have extensive details, their highest career achievements are listed.

== Argentina ==
Matthysse siblings

- Walter Matthysse (1978–), WBO Latino welterweight champion
- Edith Soledad Matthysse (1980–), WBA and WBC female featherweight champion
- Lucas Matthysse (1982–), WBA (Regular) welterweight, WBC interim light welterweight champion

Bermúdez siblings

- Gustavo David Bermúdez (1988–), WBC Latino interim light welterweight champion
- Daniela Romina Bermúdez (1989–), WBO female super flyweight; IBF, and WBO female bantamweight champion
- Roxana Ayelyn Bermúdez (1995–)
- Evelyn Nazarena Bermúdez (1996–), IBF female light flyweight champion

== Australia ==
Green family

- Danny Green (1973–), WBA light heavyweight champion, IBO cruiserweight champion and Interim WBC super-middleweight title
- Archie Green (Danny's son; 2007–), upcoming lightweight boxer

Mundine family

- Tony Mundine (1951–2026), Commonwealth middleweight champion; Australian middleweight, light heavyweight, cruiserweight and heavyweight champion
- Anthony Mundine (Tony's son; 1975–), WBA super middleweight champion; IBO middleweight champion
- Rahim Mundine (Anthony's son; 2001–), upcoming super welterweight boxer

Moloney brothers

- Andrew Moloney (1991–), Interim WBA super-flyweight champion
- Jason Moloney (1991–), WBO bantamweight champion

Nicolson siblings

- Jamie Nicolson (1971–), World Championships and Commonwealth Games bronze medalist
- Skye Nicolson (Jamie's sister; 1995–) WBC featherweight title and WBC super bantamweight title

Nissen brothers

- Henry Nissen (1948–), former Australian flyweight title, Commonwealth flyweight title, induction into Australian National Boxing Hall of Fame
- Leon Nissen (1948–), former amateur boxer, represented Australia at the 1970 Commonwealth Games

Opetaia family

- Billy Opetaia (1942–), fought for the New Zealand middleweight championship before settling in Australia in the 1970s
- Martin Opetaia (Billy's son), fought domestically in the Australian heavyweight division in the 1990s
- Jai Opetaia (Martin's son; 1995–), IBF, The Ring and WBA (Regular) cruiserweight champion

Parr family

- John Wayne Parr (1976–), former Australian middleweight champion
- Jasmine Parr (John Wayne's daughter; 2003–), Current Australian super flyweight champion

Tszyu family

- Kostya Tszyu (1969–), former IBF, WBC, WBA, and The Ring light-welterweight Champion, International Boxing Hall of Fame member
- Tim Tszyu (Kostya's son; 1994–), former WBO light middleweight Champion, Australasian light middleweight champion
- Nikita Tszyu (Kostya's son; 1998–), Current Australian super welterweight champion

== Brazil ==
Falcão brothers

- Yamaguchi Falcão (1987–), WBO Latino middleweight champion, silver medal at 2011 Pan American Games, bronze at 2012 Olympics
- Esquiva Falcão (1989–), Middleweight bronze medal at 2011 World Championships, silver at 2012 Summer Olympics

Conceicao brothers

Robson Conceição 2016 Olympic Gold medalist. Former WBC Super feather world champion.

Hebert Conceição 2021 Olympic Gold medalist.

== Bulgaria ==
Pulev brothers

- Kubrat Pulev (1981–), European heavyweight champion
- Tervel Pulev (1983–), Bronze medal at 2012 Summer Olympics, European cruiserweight champion

== Canada ==
Gatti brothers

- Joe Gatti (1967–), light middleweight world title challenger
- Arturo Gatti (1972–2009), IBF super featherweight champion; WBC light welterweight champion

Hilton family

- Dave Hilton Sr. (1940–2023), Canadian middleweight champion
- Dave Hilton Jr. (Dave Sr.'s son; 1963–), WBC super middleweight champion
- Alex Hilton (Dave Sr.'s son; 1964–), Canadian middleweight champion
- Matthew Hilton (Dave Sr.'s son; 1965–), IBF light middleweight champion

Vanderpool brothers

- Fitz Vanderpool (1967–), World Boxing Federation (WBF) welterweight and light middleweight champion
- Syd Vanderpool (1972–), WBO-NABO super middleweight champion

== Colombia ==
Cardona brothers

- Prudencio Cardona (1951–2019), WBC flyweight champion
- Ricardo Cardona (1952–2015), WBA super bantamweight champion

== Cuba ==
Savón family

- Félix Savón (1967–), Gold medals at 1992, 1996 and 2000 Summer Olympics, and 1986, 1989, 1991, 1993, 1995 and 1997 World Championships
- Erislandy Savón (Félix's nephew; 1990–), Bronze medal at 2016 Summer Olympics, gold medal at 2017 World Championships

Ribalta brothers

- José Ribalta (eldest), welterweight
- José Ribalta (middle), heavyweight, 1976 Giraldo Córdova Cardín participant, fought Teófilo Stevenson three times in the mid-1970s, also fought Aziz Salihu
- José Manuel Ribalta (youngest; 1963–), heavyweight, 1979-1981 Florida State Golden Gloves Champion and AAU District Champ, 1981 National Golden Gloves finalist, WBC contender during the mid-1980s and the early 1990s, fought James Smith, Mike Tyson, Leon Spinks, Larry Holmes, Vitali Klitschko, Chris Byrd, Donovan Ruddock

== Denmark ==
Bredahl brothers

- Jimmi Bredahl (1967–), WBO, IBO, European super featherweight champion
- Johnny Bredahl (1968–), WBA, IBO, WBU, European bantamweight, WBO super flyweight champion; first Danish WBA champion

The only brothers in the world to become world champions the same night at the same event. Took place at Parken Stadium on September 4, 1992.

== Dominican Republic ==
Cruz brothers

- Carlos Cruz (1937–1970), WBA, and WBC lightweight champion
- Leo Cruz (1953–), WBA super bantamweight champion

== Fiji ==
Singh family

- Gyan Singh, father and boxing coach Uptown Boxing Club(Joseph Kwadjo), board member of the Fijian boxing commission
- Ubyad Haider (born Nathaniel Singh, died 2024) Fijian Super flyweight title holder
- Sebastian “The Sniper” Singh, Fijian cruiserweight title holder

== France ==
Tiozzo brothers

- Christophe Tiozzo (1963–), WBA super middleweight champion
- Fabrice Tiozzo (1969–), WBA, and WBC light heavyweight, WBA cruiserweight champion

== Germany ==
Rocchigiani brothers

- Ralf Rocchigiani (1963–), WBO cruiserweight champion
- Graciano Rocchigiani (1963–2018), IBF super middleweight, WBC light heavyweight champion

== Italy ==
Garbelli family

- Giuseppe Cesare Garbelli (1907–1945) Italian Lightweight Champion
- Giancarlo Garbelli (1931–2013) Italian and WBC Champion Welterweight and Middleweight

Stecca brothers

- Loris Stecca (1960–), WBA super bantamweight champion
- Maurizio Stecca (1963–), WBO featherweight champion

== Japan ==
Ioka family

- Kazunori Ioka (Kazuto's father; 1967–), Promoter
- Hiroki Ioka (Kazunori's brother; 1969–), WBC mini flyweight, WBA light flyweight champion
- Kazuto Ioka (Kazunori's son & Hiroki's cousin; 1989–), WBA mini flyweight, WBC mini flyweight, WBA light flyweight, WBA flyweight, WBO super flyweight champion

Kameda family

- Shiro Kameda (1965–), Trainer of Kameda brothers
- Koki Kameda (Shiro's son; 1986–), WBA light flyweight, WBA bantamweight, WBC flyweight champion
- Daiki Kameda (Shiro's son; 1989–), WBA flyweight, IBF super flyweight champion
- Tomoki Kameda (Shiro's son; 1991–), WBO bantamweight champion
- Kyonosuke Kameda (Shiro's nephew; 1998–), featherweight and super bantamweight contender

Inoue family

- Shingo Inoue (Naoya's father), former amateur fighter; trainer of Naoya, Takuma, and Koki
- Koki Inoue (Naoya's cousin; 1992–), WBO Asia Pacific light welterweight champion
- Naoya Inoue (1993–), WBC light flyweight, WBO super flyweight, undisputed bantamweight, and undisputed super bantamweight world champion
- Takuma Inoue (Naoya's brother; 1995–), WBA bantamweight champion, WBC Bantamweight champion

Noguchi family

- Susumu Noguchi, welterweight champion
- Kyō Noguchi, flyweight champion
- Osamu Noguchi, boxing promoter

== Mexico ==
Álvarez brothers

- Rigoberto Álvarez (1978–), WBA interim light middleweight champion
- Ricardo Álvarez (1981–), WBC Latino and WBC Continental Americas light welterweight champion
- Ramon Álvarez (1986–), WBC-NABF light middleweight champion
- Canelo Álvarez (1990–), WBA (Unified), WBC, WBO, and The Ring light middleweight, WBA (Super), WBC, IBF, and The Ring middleweight, WBA (Super), WBC, WBO, and The Ring super middleweight, and WBO light heavyweight champion

Arce brothers

- Jorge Arce (1979–), WBC, WBO light flyweight, WBO super flyweight, WBO bantamweight, WBO super bantamweight champion
- Francisco Arce Armenta (1981–), WBC-NABF super bantamweight champion

Arredondo brothers

- Ricardo Arredondo (1949–1991), WBC super featherweight champion
- Roberto Arredondo (1958–), Japanese featherweight champion
- René Arredondo (1961–), WBC light welterweight champion

Burgos family

- Víctor Burgos (1974–), IBF light flyweight champion
- Juan Carlos Burgos (Victor's nephew; 1987–), WBC Silver super featherweight champion

Castillo brothers

- José Luis Castillo (1973–), WBC lightweight champion
- Ricardo Castillo (1979–), WBC-NABF featherweight champion

Chávez family

- Julio César Chávez (1962–), WBC super featherweight, WBA, and WBC lightweight, WBC, and IBF light welterweight champion
- Roberto Chávez González (Julio's brother), bantamweight
- Julio César Chávez Jr. (Julio's son; 1986–), WBC middleweight champion
- Omar Chávez (Julio's son; 1990–), WBO-NABO light middleweight champion

Díaz brothers

- Joel Díaz (1973–), IBF lightweight champion
- Antonio Díaz (1976–), IBA light welterweight champion
- Julio Díaz (1979–), IBF lightweight champion

Espadas family

- Guty Espadas (1954–), WBA flyweight champion
- Guty Espadas Jr. (Guty's son; 1974–), WBC featherweight champion

García brothers

- Raúl García (1982–), IBF, and WBO mini flyweight champion
- Ramón García Hirales (1982–), WBO light flyweight champion

González family

- Alejandro Martín González (1973–), WBC featherweight champion
- Alejandro González Jr. (Alejandro's son; 1993–), super bantamweight

Juárez sisters

- Mariana Juárez (1980–), WBC female flyweight and WBC female bantamweight champion
- Lourdes Juárez (1986–), WBC female super flyweight champion

Karass brothers

- Jesús Soto Karass (1982–), WBC-NABF welterweight champion

López family

- Ricardo Lopez (1966–), WBA, WBC, and WBO mini flyweight, IBF light flyweight champion
- Alonso López (Ricardo's son; 1986–), flyweight

Margarito family

- Antonio Margarito (1978–), WBA, IBF, and WBO welterweight champion
- Hanzel Martínez (Antonio's brother-in-law; 1991–), bantamweight

Márquez brothers

- Juan Manuel Márquez (1973–), IBF & WBO featherweight, WBC super featherweight, WBA, and WBO lightweight, WBO light welterweight champion
- Rafael Márquez (1975–), IBF, and IBO bantamweight champion

Mijares family

- Vicente Mijares (1954–), lightweight
- Cristian Mijares (Vicente's nephew; 1981–), WBA, WBC, and IBF super flyweight champion
- Ricardo Mijares (Vicente's nephew; 1988–), lightweight

Montiel family

- Manuel Montiel Sr., 1970s flyweight and trainer
- Alejandro Felix Montiel (Manuel Sr.'s son; 1971–), IBA flyweight champion
- Pedro Montiel (Manuel Sr.'s son; 1973–), middleweight
- Fernando Montiel (Manuel Sr.'s son; 1979–), WBO flyweight, WBO super flyweight, WBC, and WBO bantamweight champion
- Manuel Montiel Jr. (Manuel Sr.'s son), bantamweight
- Eduardo Montiel (Manuel Sr.'s son), middleweight

Morales family

- José Morales, 1970s boxing contender, Erik's manager
- Érik Morales (Jose's son; 1976–), WBC, and WBO super bantamweight, WBC featherweight, WBC, and IBF super featherweight, WBC light welterweight champion
- Diego Morales (Jose's son; 1979–), WBO super flyweight champion
- Iván Morales (Jose's son; 1991–), bantamweight prospect

Páez family

- Jorge Páez (1965–), IBF, and WBO featherweight champion
- Jorge Páez Jr. (Jorge's son; 1987–), WBC Youth Intercontinental welterweight champion
- Azriel Páez (Jorge's son; 1989–), welterweight

Ruelas brothers

- Gabriel Ruelas (1970–), WBC super featherweight champion
- Rafael Ruelas (1971–), IBF lightweight champion

Sánchez family

- Salvador Sánchez (1959–1982), WBC featherweight champion
- Salvador Sánchez II (Salvador's nephew; 1985–), featherweight

Solís brothers

- Jorge Solís (1979–), WBA interim super featherweight champion
- Ulises Solís (1981–), IBF light flyweight champion

Zárate family

- Carlos Zárate (1951–), WBC bantamweight champion
- Joel Luna Zárate (Carlos's nephew; 1965–), WBO Latino super flyweight champion
- Carlos Zárate Jr. (Carlos's son; 1988–), light welterweight

== Norway ==
Havnå family

- Magne Havnå (1963–2004), WBO cruiserweight champion
- Kai Robin Havnå (Magne's son; 1989–), IBO International cruiserweight champion

== Panama ==
Durán family

- Roberto Durán (1951–), WBA, and WBC lightweight, WBC welterweight, WBA light middleweight, WBC middleweight champion
- Santiago Samaniego (Roberto's nephew; 1974–), WBA light middleweight champion
- Irichelle Durán (Roberto's daughter; 1976–), super bantamweight

Pedroza Family

- Eusebio Pedroza (1956–2019), WBA featherweight champion
- Rafael Pedroza (Eusebio's cousin; 1955–), WBA super flyweight champion

== Philippines ==
Donaire family

- Glenn Donaire (Nonito's brother; 1979–), WBC Latino super flyweight champion
- Nonito Donaire (1982–), IBF, and IBO flyweight, WBA (Super), WBC, and WBO bantamweight, WBO, IBF, and The Ring super bantamweight, WBA (Super) featherweight champion
- Richard Donaire (Nonito's cousin; 1987–), super flyweight

Magramo family

- Ric Magramo Sr., 1960s Flyweight contender
- Ric Magramo Jr. (Ric Sr.'s son; 1961–), light flyweight
- Melvin Magramo (1971–), WBO Inter-Continental, and OPBF flyweight champion
- Ronnie Magramo (1972–), WBF mini flyweight champion
- Giemel Magramo (Melvin's son; 1994–), WBC International flyweight champion

Pacquiao brothers

- Manny Pacquiao (1978–), WBC flyweight, IBF super bantamweight, WBA (Super), IBF, and The Ring featherweight, WBC, and The Ring super featherweight, WBC lightweight, IBO, and The Ring light welterweight, WBA (Super), and WBO welterweight, WBC light middleweight champion
- Bobby Pacquiao (1980–), WBO Asia-Pacific lightweight champion

Pagara brothers

- Jason Pagara (1988–), WBO Asia-Pacific Youth lightweight, WBO Asia-Pacific Youth and WBO International light welterweight champion
- Albert Pagara (1994–), IBF Intercontinental, and WBO Intercontinental super bantamweight champion

Peñalosa family

- Carl Peñalosa (1938–), lightweight and light welterweight
- Jonathan Peñalosa (Carl's son), WBC International flyweight champion
- Dodie Boy Peñalosa (Carl's son; 1962–), IBF light flyweight, IBF flyweight champion
- Gerry Peñalosa (Carl's son; 1972–), WBC super flyweight, WBO bantamweight champion
- Dodie Boy Jr. (Carl's grandson; 1991–), featherweight

Jaro family

- Aljoe Jaro (1973–), 1980-90s super featherweight contender, Amnat Ruenroeng's trainer
- Francisco Jaro (Aljoe's younger brother), Amnat Ruenroeng's trainer
- Sonny Boy Jaro (Francisco & Aljoe's cousin; 1982–), WBC flyweight champion

Rubillar brothers

- Ernesto Rubillar (1970–), mini flyweight and flyweight
- Juanito Rubillar (1977–), light flyweight
- Robert Rubilar (1981–), super bantamweight

Sonsona family

- Eden Sonsona (1988–), Philippines Games & Amusement Board bantamweight champion
- Marvin Sonsona (Eden's cousin; 1990–), WBO super flyweight champion

== Poland ==
Skrzecz brothers

- Grzegorz Skrzecz
- Paweł Skrzecz

Kosedowski brothers

- Dariusz Kosedowski
- Krzysztof Kosedowski
- Leszek Kosedowski

Malinowski brothers

- Dallas Malinowski
- Aj Malinowski

== Puerto Rico ==
Arroyo brothers

- McJoe Arroyo (1985–), WBO Latino super flyweight champion
- McWilliams Arroyo (1985–), WBO Latino flyweight champion

Bisbal brothers

- Victor Bisbal (1980–), heavyweight
- Gerardo Bisbal (1984–), amateur heavyweight

Camacho family

- Héctor Camacho (1962–2012), WBC super featherweight, WBC lightweight, WBO light welterweight, IBC welterweight, IBC middleweight, and IBC light middleweight champion
- Felix Camacho (Héctor's brother; 1966–), WBF super bantamweight champion
- Héctor Camacho Jr. (Héctor's son; 1978–), welterweight

Cotto family

- José Miguel Cotto (1977–), WBO Intercontinental super featherweight champion
- Abner Cotto (José's cousin; 1987–), lightweight
- Miguel Cotto (José's brother; 1980–), WBO light welterweight, WBA, and WBO welterweight, WBA light middleweight, WBC middleweight champion

Serrano sisters

- Cindy Serrano (1986–), WBO female featherweight champion
- Amanda Serrano (1988–), WBO female super flyweight, bantamweight, super bantamweight, featherweight, lightweight, light welterweight, and IBF female super featherweight champion

Solis brothers

- Enrique Solis, world title challenger
- Santos Solis (1954–2007), light welterweight, welterweight and light middleweight
- Julian Solís (1957–), WBA bantamweight champion
- Rafael Solis (1958–), super featherweight world title challenger

Vázquez family

- Wilfredo Vázquez (1960–), WBA bantamweight, WBA super bantamweight, WBA featherweight champion
- Wilfredo Vázquez Jr. (Wilfredo's son; 1984–), WBO super bantamweight champion

== Romania ==
Simion brothers

- Marian Simion (1975–), light middleweight silver medal at 2000 Summer Olympics
- Dorel Simion (1977–), welterweight bronze medal at 2000 Summer Olympics

== Thailand ==
Amateur

Boonjumnong brothers

- Manus Boonjumnong (1980–), light welterweight gold medal at 2004 Summer Olympics, silver medal at 2008 Summer Olympics
- Non Boonjumnong (1982–), welterweight silver medal at 2007 AIBA World Championships

Kamsing brothers

- Somrot Kamsing (1971–), light flyweight participant at 1996 Summer Olympics
- Somluck Kamsing (1973–), featherweight gold medal at 1996 Summer Olympics

Jongjohor family

- Somjit Jongjohor (1975–), flyweight gold medal at 2008 Summer Olympics
- Weerapon Jongjoho (Somjit's nephew; 2001–), Best Male Boxer at 2017 Thailand Youth Amateur Boxing Championships

Pannon family

- Suban Pannon (1978–), light flyweight gold medal at 1998 Asian Games
- Bannaphol Pannon (Suban's son), welterweight bronze medal at 2017 Asian Youth Amateur Boxing Championships

Professional

Poontarat brothers

- Payao Poontarat (1957–2006), light flyweight bronze medal at 1976 Summer Olympics, WBC super flyweight champion
- Panieng Poontarat (1969–), PABA light flyweight champion, Fahlan Sakkreerin Jr.'s trainer

Phonthawee family

- Sagat Phonthawee (1957–), WBC super bantamweight challenger
- Suriya Prasathinphimai (Sagat's cousin; 1980–), middleweight bronze medal at 2004 Summer Olympics

Galaxy twins

- Khaosai Galaxy (1959–), WBA super flyweight champion
- Khaokor Galaxy (1959–), WBA bantamweight champion

Payakaroon brothers

- Samart Payakaroon (1962–), WBC super bantamweight champion
- Kongtoranee Payakaroon (1960–), WBC, and WBA super flyweight challenger

Sor Vorapin brothers

- Ratanapol Sor Vorapin (1974–), IBF mini flyweight champion
- Ratanachai Sor Vorapin (1976–), WBO bantamweight champion
- Kaichon Sor Vorapin (1981–), WBO Asian Pacific light flyweight champion
- Kosol Sor Vorapin (1984–), PABA super bantamweight champion

Sitbangprachan brothers

- Pichit Sitbangprachan (1966–), IBF flyweight champion
- Pichitnoi Sitbangprachan (1975–), WBA light flyweight champion

Porpaoin twins

- Chana Porpaoin (1966–), WBA mini flyweight champion
- Songkram Porpaoin (1966–), WBA interim mini flyweight champion

Charoen family

- Wanwin Charoen (1971–), WBF mini flyweight challenger
- Wandee Singwancha (Wanwin's cousin; 1980–), WBC mini flyweight, WBC interim light flyweight champion

Chaorai-Oi family

- Chartchainoi Chaorai-Oi (1965–), 1990s super flyweight contender
- Takrawlek Dejrath (Chaorai-Oi's brother; 1972–), 1990s light flyweight contender
- Chainoi Worawut (Chaorai-Oi's son and Dejrath's nephew; 1997–), WBC-ABC super bantamweight champion

Dutch Boy Gym brothers

- Samson Dutch Boy Gym (1972–), WBF super flyweight champion
- Dutch Boy Dutch Boy Gym, 1990s contender

Sor Rungvisai brothers

- Suriyan Sor Rungvisai (1989–), WBC super flyweight champion
- Nawaphon Sor Rungvisai (1991–), WBC-ABC flyweight champion

Sakkreerin family

- Fahlan Sakkreerin (1968–), IBF mini flyweight, WBF flyweight champion
- Fahlan Sakkreerin Jr. (Fahlan's son; 1993–), IBF mini flyweight, IBF interim light flyweight challenger

Kratingdaenggym family

- Poonsawat Kratingdaenggym (1980–), WBA super bantamweight champion
- Stamp Kratingdaenggym (Poonsawat's cousin; 1998–), WBA interim flyweight champion

Phisitvuthinun family

- Surachart Phisitvuthinun (1950–), 1960s contender, Venice Borkhorsor's boxing partner, Veeraphol Sahaprom, Suriyan Sor Rungvisai & Srisaket Sor Rungvisai's manager
- Chokchai Phisitvuthinun (Surachart's son; 1977–), Suriyan Sor Rungvisai & Srisaket Sor Rungvisai's trainer

== Ukraine ==
Klitschko brothers

- Vitali Klitschko (1971–), WBC, WBO, and The Ring heavyweight champion
- Wladimir Klitschko (1976–), super heavyweight gold medal at 1996 Summer Olympics, WBA (Super), IBF, WBO, IBO, and The Ring heavyweight champion

Sydorenko brothers

- Volodymyr Sydorenko (1976–), WBA Bantamweight champion
- Valeriy Sydorenkno (twin; 1976–), 2000 Sydney Olympian

== United Kingdom ==
Benn family

- Nigel Benn (1964–), WBO middleweight and WBC super middleweight champion
- Conor Benn (Nigel's son; 1996–), WBA Continental welterweight champion

Booth brothers

- Jason Booth (1977–), British and Commonwealth flyweight champion; IBO super flyweight champion; Commonwealth bantamweight champion; British and Commonwealth super bantamweight champion
- Nicky Booth (1980–2021), British and Commonwealth bantamweight champion

Dubois siblings

- Daniel Dubois (1997–), IBF heavyweight champion
- Caroline Dubois (Daniel's sister; 2001–), lightweight gold medal at 2018 Youth Olympics

Edwards brothers

- Charlie Edwards (1993–), WBC flyweight and British super flyweight champion
- Sunny Edwards (1996–), IBF flyweight and British super flyweight champion

Eubank family

- Chris Eubank (1966–), WBO middleweight and WBO super middleweight champion
- Chris Eubank Jr. (Chris Sr.'s son; 1989–), British and WBA interim middleweight champion; IBO super middleweight champion

Finnegan brothers

- Chris Finnegan (1944–2009), British, Commonwealth, and European light heavyweight champion
- Kevin Finnegan (1948–2008), British and European middleweight champion

Fury family

- John Fury (Tyson's father; 1964–)
- Peter Fury (Tyson's uncle; 1968–)
- Andy Lee (Tyson's cousin; 1984–), WBO middleweight champion
- Tyson Fury: (1988–), WBA (Super), WBC, IBF, WBO, IBO, The Ring heavyweight champion
- Hosea Burton (Tyson's cousin; 1988–), British light heavyweight champion
- Hughie Fury (Tyson's cousin; 1994–), British heavyweight champion
- Nathan Gorman (Tyson's cousin; 1996–), WBC International Silver heavyweight champion
- Tommy Fury (Tyson's half brother; 1999–), cruiserweight
- Roman Fury (Tyson's brother; 1996–), heavyweight

Hatton family

- Ricky Hatton (1978–2025), WBA, IBF, IBO, and The Ring light welterweight champion; WBA welterweight champion
- Matthew Hatton (Ricky's brother; 1981–), European welterweight champion
- Campbell Hatton (Ricky's son; 2001–)

Itauma brothers

- Moses Itauma (2004–), Commonwealth heavyweight champion
- Karol Itauma (2000–), light heavyweight gold medal at 2018 Youth Olympics

Khan brothers

- Amir Khan (1986–), WBA (Super) and IBF light welterweight champion,
- Haroon Khan (1991–), flyweight bronze medal at 2010 Commonwealth Games

London family

- Jack London (1913–1963), British heavyweight champion
- Brian London (Jack's son; 1934–2021), British heavyweight champion

Magee brothers

- Terry Magee (1964–), Northern Ireland Area light middleweight champion; BUI light middleweight champion
- Noel Magee (1965–), Commonwealth light heavyweight champion
- Eamonn Magee (1971–), Commonwealth light welterweight champion

McDonnell twins

- Gavin McDonnell (1986–), British and European super bantamweight champion
- Jamie McDonnell (1986–), WBA (Regular) and IBF bantamweight champion

Minter family

- Alan Minter (1951–2020), WBC middleweight champion
- Ross Minter (1978–), English welterweight champion

Selby brothers

- Lee Selby (1987–), IBF featherweight champion
- Andrew Selby (1988–), flyweight silver medal at 2011 AIBA World Championships, flyweight bronze medal at 2013 AIBA World Championships

Smith brothers

- Paul Smith (1982–), British middleweight champion; British super middleweight champion
- Stephen Smith (1985–), British, and Commonwealth featherweight, British super featherweight champion
- Liam Smith (1988–), British, Commonwealth, and WBO light middleweight champion
- Callum Smith (1990–), WBA (Super) and The Ring super middleweight champion

Yafai brothers

- Khalid Yafai (1989–), WBA super flyweight champion
- Gamal Yafai (1991–), Commonwealth super bantamweight champion
- Galal Yafai (1992–), light flyweight gold medal at 2018 Commonwealth Games

== United States ==
Ali family

- Muhammad Ali (1942–2016), WBA, WBC, and The Ring heavyweight champion
- Rahaman Ali (Muhammad's brother; 1943–2025), heavyweight
- Laila Ali (Muhammad's daughter; 1977–), WBC female super middleweight champion
- Ibn Ali (Rahaman's son; 1979–), cruiserweight and heavyweight
- Nico Ali Walsh (Rasheda's son, Muhammad's grandson; 2001–), middleweight

Ayala family

- Tony Ayala Sr. (1935–2014), former boxer and trainer of his four sons
- Mike Ayala (Tony Sr.'s son; 1958–), WBC-NABF super bantamweight, WBC-NABF featherweight champion
- Sammy Ayala (Tony Sr.'s son; 1959–), welterweight
- Tony Ayala Jr. (Tony Sr.'s son; 1963–), light middleweight
- Paulie Ayala (Tony Sr.'s son), featherweight
- Edgar Ayala

Baer brothers

- Max Baer (1909–1959), heavyweight world champion
- Buddy Baer (1915–1986), heavyweight

Baltazar brothers

- Frankie Baltazar (1958–), super featherweight contender
- Tony Baltazar (1961–), lightweight contender
- Robert Baltazar (1963–), welterweight contender

Beard brothers

- Rickey Beard (1959–1985), welterweight
- Jackie Beard (1961–), WBC-NABF featherweight champion
- Obie Beard, light welterweight

Byrd family

- Joe Byrd Sr., 1992 US Olympic Team head coach
- Antoine Byrd (Joe Sr.'s son; 1962–), IBF-USBA super middleweight champion
- Tracy Byrd (Joe Sr.'s daughter; 1964–), IBA female lightweight, WIBO light welterweight champion
- Patrick Byrd (Joe Sr.'s son; 1968–), welterweight
- Chris Byrd (Joe Sr.'s son; 1970–), IBF, and WBO heavyweight champion
- Lamon Brewster (Joe Sr.'s nephew; 1973–), WBO heavyweight champion

Carbajal brothers

- Michael Carbajal (1967–), light flyweight silver medal at 1988 Summer Olympics, WBC, IBF, and WBO light flyweight champion
- Cruz Carbajal (1974–), WBO bantamweight champion

Canizales brothers

- Gaby Canizales (1960–), WBA, and WBO bantamweight champion
- Orlando Canizales (1965–), IBF bantamweight champion

Charlo brothers

- Jermall Charlo (1990–), IBF light middleweight, WBC middleweight champion
- Jermell Charlo (1990–), WBA (Super), WBC, IBF, and The Ring light middleweight champion

Cisneros family

- Ron Cisneros (1961–), bantamweight
- Mike Alvarado (Ron's son; 1980–), WBO light welterweight champion
- Ricky Lopez (Mike's cousin; 1987–), super bantamweight

Cortez brothers

- Joe Cortez (1943–), featherweight and world championship referee
- Mike Cortez (1942–), lightweight

Curry brothers

- Bruce Curry (1956–), WBC light welterweight champion
- Graylin Curry (1960–), light middleweight
- Donald Curry (1961–), WBA, WBC, IBF welterweight, and The Ring welterweight, WBC light middleweight champion

Dundee brothers (first siblings to become world champions)

- Joe Dundee (1903–1982), NYSAC welterweight champion
- Vince Dundee (1907–1949), NYSAC middleweight champion

De La Hoya family

- Joel De La Hoya Sr., Mike Anchondo & Daniel Ponce de León's manager
- Joel De La Hoya Jr. (Joel Sr.'s son), Diego De La Hoya's manager
- Oscar De La Hoya (Joel Sr.'s son; 1971–), lightweight gold medal at 1992 Summer Olympics, WBO super featherweight, IBF, and WBO lightweight, WBC light welterweight, WBC welterweight, WBA, WBC, and The Ring light middleweight, WBO middleweight champion
- Diego De La Hoya (Oscar's cousin; 1994–), WBC-NABF, and WBO-NABO super bantamweight champion

Douglas family

- William Douglas (1940–1999), middleweight and light heavyweight
- James Buster Douglas (William's son; 1960–), WBA, WBC, and IBF heavyweight champion
- Lamar Douglas (James' son)

Eklund & Ward brothers

- Dicky Eklund (1957–), welterweight
- Micky Ward (1965–), WBU light welterweight champion
- Sean Eklund (their nephew, 1984-), super lightweight

Figueroa/Barrios family

- Omar Figueroa Jr. (1989–), WBC lightweight champion
- Brandon Figueroa (Omar's brother)(1996–), WBC super bantamweight and featherweight champion
- Mario Barrios (Omar's and Brandon's brother-in-law) (1991–), WBC welterweight champion
- Selina Barrios (Mario's sister) (1993–), North American Boxing Federation lightweight champion

Flanagan brothers

- Del Flanagan (1928–2003), welterweight
- Glen Flanagan (1926–1979), featherweight

Folley family

- Zora Folley (1931–1972), heavyweight
- Robert Folley (Zora's son; 1959–), light heavyweight and cruiserweight

Foreman family

- George Foreman (1949–2025), WBA, WBC, IBF, and The Ring heavyweight champion
- Freeda Foreman (George's daughter; 1976–2019), middleweight
- George Foreman III (George's son; 1983–), heavyweight

Frazier family

- Joe Frazier (1944–2011), NYSAC, WBA, WBC, and The Ring heavyweight champion
- Marvis Frazier (Joe's son; 1960–), heavyweight
- Jackie Frazier-Lyde (Joe's daughter; 1961–), WIBA light heavyweight champion
- Tyrone Frazier (Joe's nephew; 1962–), super middleweight and light heavyweight
- Joe Frazier Jr. (Joe's son; 1962–), welterweight

Fullmer brothers

- Gene Fullmer (1931–2015), WBA middleweight champion
- Jay Fullmer (1937–2015), lightweight and welterweight
- Don Fullmer (1939–2012), middleweight

Fundora family

- Sebastian Fundora (1997–), WBO light middleweight champion
- Gabriela Fundora (Sebastian's sister; 2002–), IBF flyweight champion

Garcia family

- Eduardo Garcia (1942–), world champion trainer
- Robert Garcia (Eduardo's son; 1975–), IBF super featherweight champion
- Miguel Garcia (Eduardo's son; 1987–), WBO featherweight, WBO super featherweight champion
- Irving Garcia (Robert's nephew; 1989–), lightweight prospect
- Javier Garcia Calderón (Robert's nephew; 1989–), lightweight
- David Garcia (Robert's nephew; 1990–), welterweight

Gardner brothers

- George Gardner (1877–1954), light heavyweight world champion
- Billy Gardner (1879–1950), New England featherweight champion
- Jimmy Gardner (1885–1964), welterweight world champion

Gibbons brothers

- Mike Gibbons (1887–1956), middleweight
- Tommy Gibbons (1891–1960), heavyweight title challenger

Hagler & Sims brothers

- Marvin Hagler (1954–2021), WBA, WBC, IBF, and The Ring middleweight champion
- Robbie Sims (1959–), middleweight title challenger

Harris & Johnson brothers

- James Harris
- Mark Johnson (1971–), IBF flyweight, IBF, and WBO super flyweight champion

Hearns family

- Thomas Hearns (1958–), WBA welterweight, WBC light middleweight, WBO super middleweight, WBA, and WBC light heavyweight, IBO cruiserweight champion
- Billy Hearns (Thomas's brother), super featherweight
- Ronald Hearns (Thomas's son; 1978–), middleweight title challenger

Holyfield family

- Evander Holyfield (1962–), Undisputed cruiserweight and heavyweight champion
- Evan Holyfield (1997–), light middleweight contender

Hopkins family

- Bernard Hopkins (1965–), WBA, WBC, IBF, WBO, and The Ring middleweight, WBA (Super), WBC, IBF, and The Ring light heavyweight champion
- Demetrius Hopkins (Bernard's nephew; 1980–), IBF-USBA light welterweight

Jackson family

- Julian Jackson (1960–), WBA light middleweight, WBC middleweight champion
- Julius Jackson (Julian's son; 1987–), super middleweight
- John Jackson (Julian's son; 1989–), light middleweight

Jones family

- Roy Jones Sr.
- Roy Jones Jr. (1969–), IBF middleweight, IBF super middleweight, WBA, WBC, IBF, IBO, and The Ring light heavyweight, WBA heavyweight champion

Judah family

- Johnny Saxton (1930–2008), The Ring welterweight champion
- Yoel Judah (Johnny's nephew; 1956–), boxing trainer and kickboxing champion
- Daniel Judah (Yoel's son; 1977–), light heavyweight
- Zab Judah (Yoel's son; 1977–), IBF, and WBO light welterweight, WBA (Undisputed), WBC, IBF, and The Ring welterweight champion
- Josiah Judah (Yoel's son; 1978–), super middleweight

Labbe brothers

- Arthur "K.O." Labbe (1906–1958), Junior Welterweight
- Dom Labbe, (1909–1985), Middleweight
- Jack Labbe (fought as "Baby Jack Renault"), Middleweight
- Paul Labbe Jr. (1907–1995, fought as "Paul Junior"), Maine State and New England Lightweight champion, Welterweight contender

Leonard brothers

- Roger Leonard (1953–), light welterweight
- Sugar Ray Leonard (1956–), WBA, WBC, and The Ring welterweight, WBA, and The Ring light middleweight, WBC, and The Ring middleweight, WBC super middleweight, WBC light heavyweight champion

Litzau brothers

- Allen Litzau (1982–), featherweight
- Jason Litzau (1983–), NABF super featherweight champion

Lopez brothers

- Ernie Lopez (1945–2009), welterweight title challenger
- Danny Lopez (1952–), WBC featherweight champion

Magdaleno brothers

- Diego Magdaleno (1986–), NABF super featherweight champion
- Jessie Magdaleno (1991–), WBO super bantamweight champion
- Marco Magdaleno (1995–), lightweight

Mancini family

- Lenny Mancini (1919–2003), lightweight
- Ray Mancini (Lenny's son; 1961–), WBA lightweight champion

Mayweather family

- Floyd Mayweather Sr. (1952–), super welterweight, trainer
- Roger Mayweather (Floyd Sr.'s brother; 1961–2020), Floyd Jr.'s Trainer, WBA super featherweight, WBC light welterweight champion
- Jeff Mayweather (Floyd Sr.'s brother; 1964–), 1990s lightweight
- Floyd Mayweather Jr. (Floyd Sr.'s son; 1977–), WBC super featherweight, WBC, and The Ring lightweight, WBC light welterweight, WBA, WBC, IBF, and The Ring welterweight, WBA, WBC, and The Ring light middleweight champion
- Justin Jones (Floyd Sr.'s son; 1987–)

McCall family

- Oliver McCall (1965–), WBC heavyweight champion
- Elijah McCall (1988–), heavyweight

McCrory brothers

- Milton McCrory (1962–), WBC welterweight champion
- Steve McCrory (1964–2000), flyweight gold medal at 1984 Summer Olympics

McGirt family

- Buddy McGirt (1964–), IBF light welterweight, WBC welterweight champion
- James McGirt Jr. (Buddy's son; 1982–), super middleweight

McNeeley family

- Tom McNeeley Sr., heavyweight
- Tom McNeeley Jr. (1937–2011), heavyweight world title challenger
- Peter McNeeley (1968–), heavyweight

Norris brothers

- Orlin Norris (1965–), WBA cruiserweight champion
- Terry Norris (1967–), WBC, and IBF light middleweight champion

Patterson family

- Floyd Patterson (1935–2006), WBA, and The Ring heavyweight champion
- Raymond ”Ray” Patterson (Floyd's brother; 1942–), heavyweight
- Tracy Harris Patterson (Floyd's adopted son; 1964–), WBC super bantamweight, IBF super featherweight champion

Perez Brothers

- Irleis (Cubanito) Perez
- Tomas Perez

Quarry brothers

- Jerry Quarry (1945–1999), heavyweight
- Mike Quarry (1951–2006), light heavyweight
- Bobby Quarry (1962–), heavyweight

Richardson family

- Greg Richardson (1958–), WBC bantamweight champion
- Durrell Richardson (1979–), light middleweight
- Chester, Golden Gloves champion
- Randy, Golden Gloves champion
- Ollie, Golden Gloves champion

Russell brothers

- Gary Russell Jr. (1988–), WBC featherweight champion
- Gary Allen Russell (1993–), 2010 National Golden Gloves light welterweight champion
- Gary Antonio Russell (1993-), super bantamweight contender
- Gary Antuanne Russell (1996-), WBA light welterweight champion

Sandoval brothers

- Alberto Sandoval (1958–), bantamweight
- Richie Sandoval (1960–), WBA bantamweight champion

Shuler brothers

- James Shuler (1959–1986), WBC-NABF middleweight champion
- Marvin Shuler (1960–)

Spinks family

- Leon Spinks (1953–2021), WBA, WBC, and The Ring heavyweight champion
- Michael Spinks (Leon's brother; 1956–), WBA, WBC, IBF, and The Ring light heavyweight, IBF, and The Ring heavyweight champion
- Leon Spinks Jr. (Leon's son; 1970–1990), fought as Leon Calvin
- Darrel Spinks (Leon's son; 1973–), super welterweight
- Cory Spinks (Leon's son; 1978–), WBA, WBC, IBF, The Ring welterweight, IBF light middleweight champion
- Leon Spinks III (Leon's grandson; 1988–)

Tate brothers

- Thomas Tate (1965–), WBC-NABF super middleweight champion, middleweight and super middleweight world title challenger
- Frank Tate (1964–), IBF middleweight champion

Tubbs family

- Tony Tubbs (1958–), WBA heavyweight champion
- Nate Tubbs (Tony's brother; 1964–), heavyweight
- Robert Tubbs (Tony's cousin; 1972–), middleweight
- Roy Dale (Tony's uncle; 1942–), middleweight
- Antwaun Taylor (Tony's son; 1985–)

Tucker family

- Bob Tucker
- Tony Tucker (1958–), IBF heavyweight champion

Vargas brothers

- Fernando Vargas (1977–), WBA, and IBF light middleweight champion
- Rogelio Vargas (1982–), super middleweight

Webber sisters

- Cora Webber (1958–), IFBA light middleweight champion
- Dora Webber (1958–), IWBF lightweight champion

Zivic brothers

- Fritzie Zivic (1913–1984), NYSAC, NBA, and Ring Magazine welterweight champion
- Jack Zivic (1903–1973), lightweight and welterweight contender
- Peter Zivic (1901–1987), bantamweight and featherweight contender
- Eddie Zivic (1910–1996), welterweight contender

== Venezuela ==
España brothers

- Ernesto España (1954–), WBA lightweight champion
- Crisanto España (1964–), WBA welterweight champion

== See also ==
- List of current world boxing champions
- List of professional sports families
- List of family relations in American football
  - List of second-generation National Football League players
- List of association football (soccer) families
  - List of African association football families
  - List of European association football families
    - List of English association football families
    - List of former Yugoslavia association football families
    - List of Scottish football families
    - List of Spanish association football families
  - Category:Association football families
- List of Australian rules football families
- List of second-generation Major League Baseball players
- List of second-generation National Basketball Association players
- List of chess families
- List of International cricket families
- List of family relations in the National Hockey League
- List of family relations in rugby league
- List of international rugby union families
- List of professional wrestling families
