= Hakodate Velodrome =

Velodrome in Hakodate, Hokkaido, Japan

Coordinates: 41.777197°N 140.763901°E

Hakodate Keirin Verodrome
- Interactive map of Hakodate Keirin Verodrome
- Location: Hakodate, Japan
- Owner: Hakodate city
- Operator: Nippon Totor
- Capacity: 8,000

Construction
- Opened: June 29, 1950
- Renovated: 2002
- Architects: Kume Sekkei and Consortium
- Main contractor: Shimizu Corporation

Website
- https://keirin.hakodate.jp/

Hakodate Velodrome (函館競輪場, Hakodate Keirinjyō) is a velodrome located in Hakodate, Hokkaido that conducts pari-mutuel Keirin racing - one of Japan's four authorized "Public Sports" (公営競技, kōei kyōgi) where gambling is permitted. Its Keirin identification number for betting purposes is 11# (11 sharp).

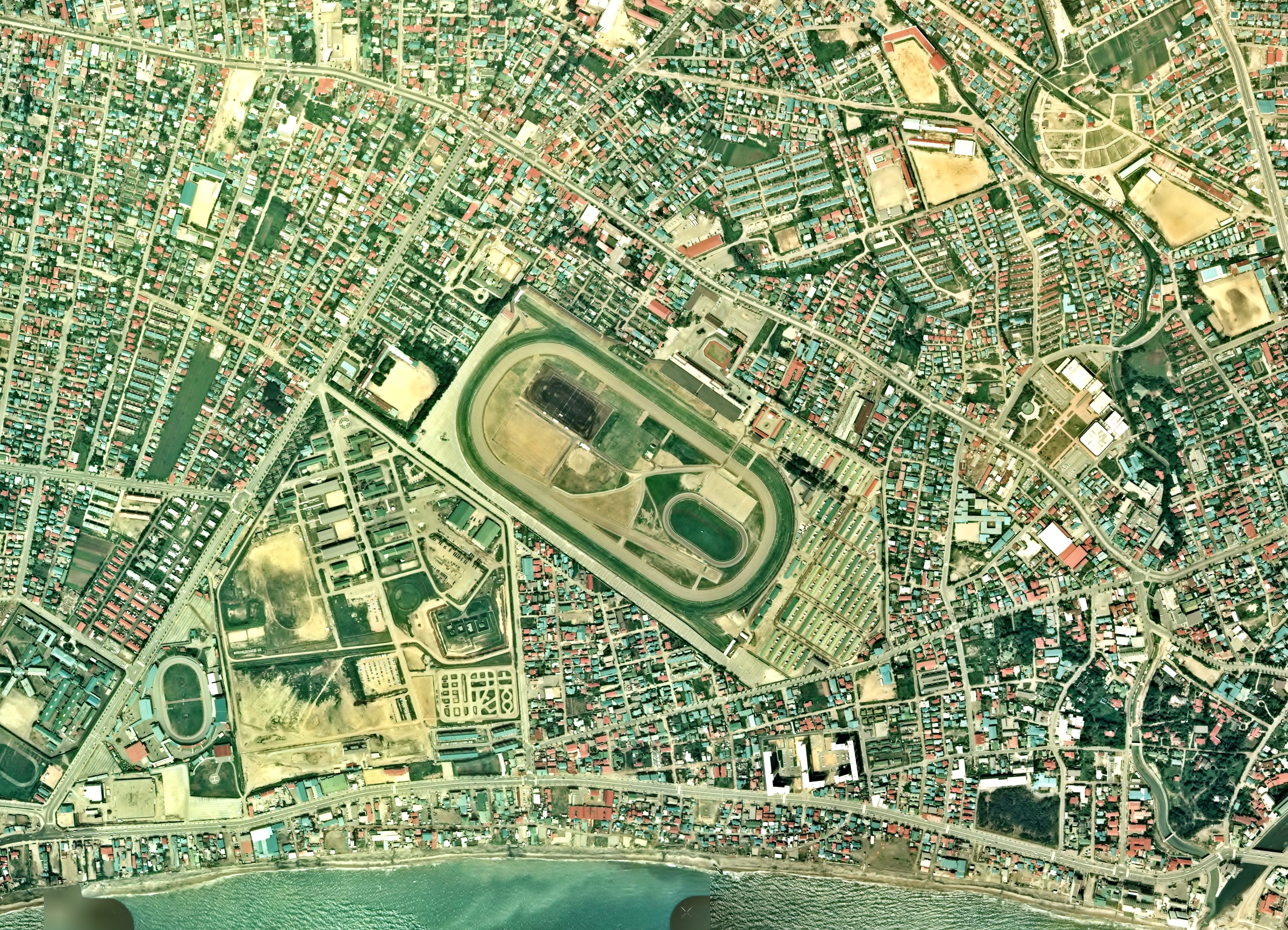
Hakodate Velodrome

Hakodate's oval is 400 meters in circumference. A typical keirin race of 2,025 meters consists of five laps around the course.

Hakodate Velodrome is the only facility on the island of Hokkaido used for Keirin races. Races are held during warm weather months, from April to October.

== See also ==
- List of cycling tracks and velodromes
