= Nagasawa =

Nagasawa (written: 長沢 lit. "long swamp" or 長澤) is a Japanese surname. Notable people with the surname include:

- Hidetoshi Nagasawa (長澤 英俊; 1940–2018), Japanese sculptor and architect
- Hiroaki Nagasawa (born 1958), Japanese politician
- Kenta Nagasawa (長澤 憲大; born 1993), Japanese judoka
- Masahiko Nagasawa (born 1965), Japanese film director
- Miki Nagasawa (born 1970), Japanese voice actress
- Masami Nagasawa (born 1987), Japanese actress
- Nao Nagasawa (born 1984), Japanese actress
- Nao Nagasawa (born 1971), Japanese voice actress
- Nagasawa Rosetsu (1754–1799), 18th-century painter
- Nagasawa Kanaye (1852–1934), Californian winemaker
- Katsutoshi Nagasawa (1923–2008), Japanese composer
- Kazuaki Nagasawa (born 1958), former Japanese football player
- Kazuki Nagasawa (born 1991), Japanese football player
- Kotoe Nagasawa (born 1950), Japanese ice skater
- Shun Nagasawa (born 1988), Japanese football player
- Tetsu Nagasawa (born 1968), former Japanese football player
- Yoshiaki Nagasawa (born 1947), Japanese bicycle builder
- Yuya Nagasawa (長沢 祐弥; born 1996), Japanese footballer

== See also ==
- Keikyū Nagasawa Station, a railway station in Yokosuka, Japan
- Nagasawa Station, a railway station in Funagata, Yamagata Prefecture, Japan
