= JKA Foundation =

Autorace Foundation

The Japan Keirin Autorace Foundation, or JKA Foundation (Japanese: 財団法人JKA, Zaidanhōjin JKA), is the regulating body for pari-mutuel keirin cycle racing and flat track motorcycle racing competitions in Japan. These sports—two of Japan's four authorized "Public Sports" (公営競技, kōei kyōgi) where gambling is permitted—were originally regulated by two separate organizations. These sports and organizations were brought under the authority of the JKA on April 1, 2008.

== Keirin ==
Prior to the JKA's founding, keirin races were overseen by the Nihon Jitensha Shinkōkai (Japanese: 日本自転車振興会, lit. Japan Bicycle Promotion Association), or Japan Keirin Association, often abbreviated NJS. Today the present JKA is responsible for fostering Japan's bicycle industry and regulating keirin racing in Japan.

In addition to licensing keirin racers, the association sets specifications for frames and parts such as wheel size, spoke count, frame geometry, and even weight and material of components. These requirements were established in 1957 in an attempt to prevent any racers from having equipment-related advantages.

Because the foundation's main objective is supporting the Japanese cycling market, its bureaucracy is notoriously critical of foreign manufacturers attempting to enter the Japanese market. The Italian cycling equipment manufacturer Campagnolo has, though, received keirin racing certification.

A common misconception regarding certification is that it is a mark of quality, when in fact it is simply a mark of standardization; parts stamped with the NJS logo have become fashionable in recent years with some Western cyclists.

== Flat track motorcycle racing (auto race) ==
Japan's flat track motorcycling industry was overseen by the Nihon Kogatajidōsha Shinkōkai (Japanese: 日本小型自動車振興会, lit. Japan Compact Car Promotion Association) prior to the founding of the JKA.
