= Sawamura =

Sawamura (written: 沢村 or 澤村) is a Japanese surname. Notable people with the surname include:

- Eiji Sawamura (沢村 栄治) (1917–1944), Japanese baseball player
- Hirokazu Sawamura (澤村 拓一) (born 1988), Japanese Nippon Professional Baseball player
- Ikki Sawamura (沢村 一樹) (born 1967) Japanese actor
- Kunitarō Sawamura (沢村 国太郎) (1905–1974), Japanese actor
- Tadashi Sawamura (沢村 忠) (1943–2021), Japanese kickboxer

Fictional characters:

- Chizuru Sawamura of Inubaka
- Haruka Sawamura of Yakuza (series)
- Seiji Sawamura and his sister Rin of Midori Days
- Daichi Sawamura of Haikyuu!
- Dai Sawamura of Space Sheriff Shaider
- Eijun Sawamura of Diamond no Ace
