= Iwaki-Taira Velodrome =

Velodrome in Iwaki, Fukushima, Japan

- air bank
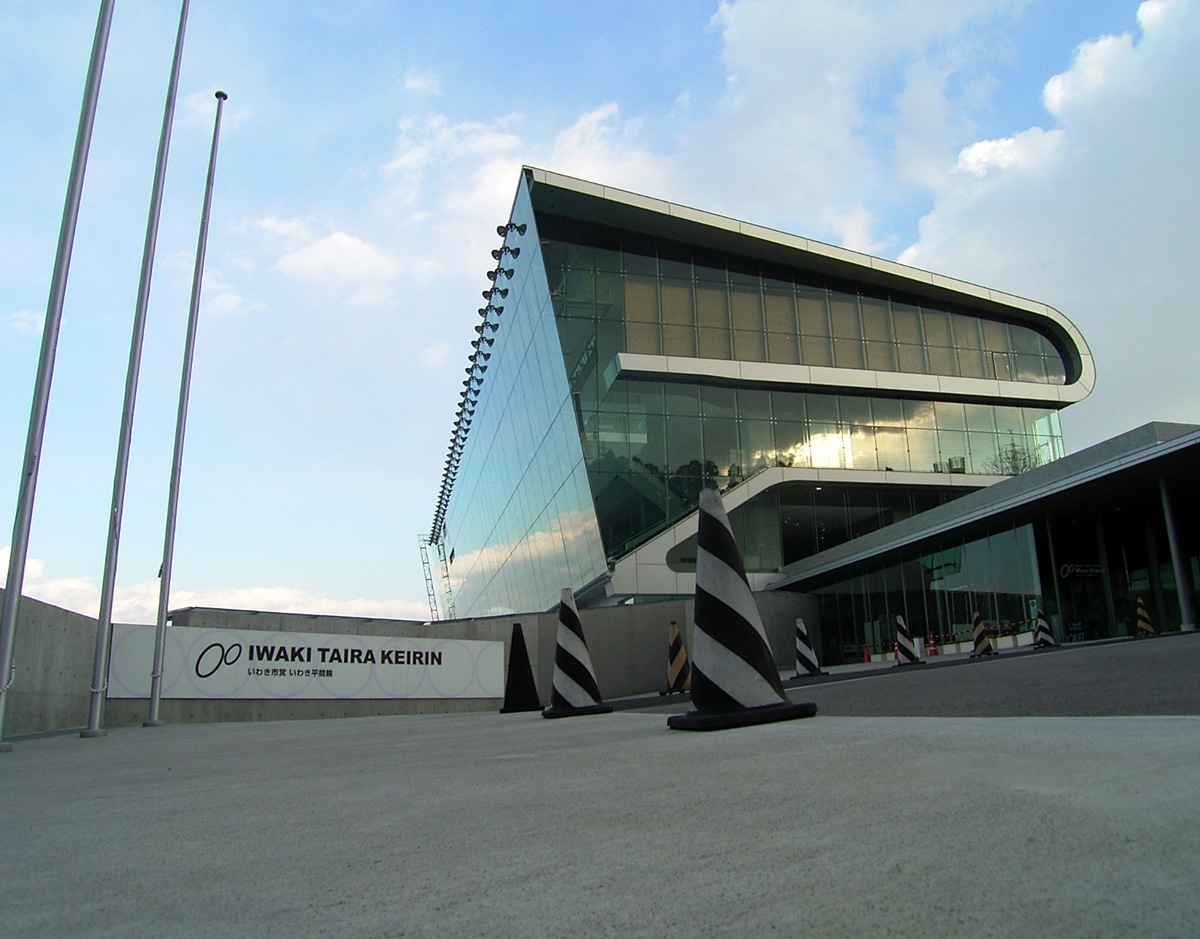
- Interactive map of Iwaki-Taira Velodrome
- Former names: Taira Velodrome
- Location: Iwaki, Fukushima, Japan
- Coordinates: 37.045899°N 140.891231°E
- Owner: Iwaki city
- Operator: Iwaki city
- Capacity: 8,000
- Surface: PCa concrete

Construction
- Opened: 1951
- Renovated: 2006
- Architect: Nihon Sekkei
- Main contractor: Obayashi Corporation

Iwaki-Taira Velodrome (いわき平競輪場, Iwakitaira Keirinjyō) is a velodrome located in Iwaki, Fukushima that conducts pari-mutuel Keirin racing - one of Japan's four authorized "Public Sports" (公営競技, kōei kyōgi) where gambling is permitted. Its Keirin identification number for betting purposes is 13# (13 sharp).

Iwaki-Taira's oval is 400 meters in circumference. A typical keirin race of 2,025 meters consists of five laps around the course.

== See also ==
- List of cycling tracks and velodromes
