= Tony Baltazar =

American boxer

Anthony Baltazar
Personal information
- Nickname: Tiger
- Nationality: American
- Born: February 5, 1961 (age 65) Los Angeles, California
- Height: 5 ft 9 in (175 cm)
- Weight: Light Welterweight; Lightweight

Boxing career
- Reach: 70 in (178 cm)
- Stance: Orthodox

Boxing record
- Total fights: 46
- Wins: 38
- Win by KO: 30
- Losses: 7
- Draws: 1
- No contests: 0

Anthony Baltazar (born February 5, 1961) is an American former boxer that competed in the Lightweight division. After an amateur career during which he won various titles, he turned professional in the late 1970s, and boxed the likes of Robin Blake, former world champion Roger Mayweather (whom he beat by ten round unanimous decision), Hector Macho Camacho and Carlos Bolillo Gonzalez, the last two of which Baltazar fought for world titles. Baltazar was a contender at the Lightweight and Jr. Welterweight divisions.

== Early life ==
Baltazar was born in Los Angeles, California and is the brother of former boxers Robert Baltazar and Frankie Baltazar.

== Professional career ==
Baltazar grew up in La Puente, Calif, Baltazar now resides in Phoenix. He was one time the holder of a WBO regional title, the North American Boxing Organization Jr. Welterweight championship. His brother, Frankie Baltazar, was also a top rated contender during most of the 1980s.

In 1995, Baltazar and his wife had a son who developed a strange blood disease. Two years later, the disease was diagnosed and Baltazar and his family started travelling constantly to Rochester, Minnesota for treatment. In between, Baltazar organized a foundation that helps grow funds for kids with that disease. After constant improvement and fall backs, Baltazar's son died in 2001, at the age of 6. In memory of his son, Baltazar has kept the foundation on working, and he and his helpers organize charity boxing undercards, rodeos and auctions every year.

=== Retirement ===
Baltazar's activities have been attended by several celebrities, such as world champion boxers George Foreman, Evander Holyfield and Carlos Palomino, as well as a varied list of Hollywood actors. In 2001, the auction charity was attended by Alice Cooper, former world boxing champion Michael Carbajal, daredevil Spanky Spangler and others. The Baltazar brothers Frankie, Tony and Bobby were trained and managed by their father, Frank Baltazar sr.

Tony now works at Jacksons car wash in Arizona as a glass sales representative.

== See also ==
- Notable boxing families
