= Japan Professional Sports Grand Prize =

Sports award

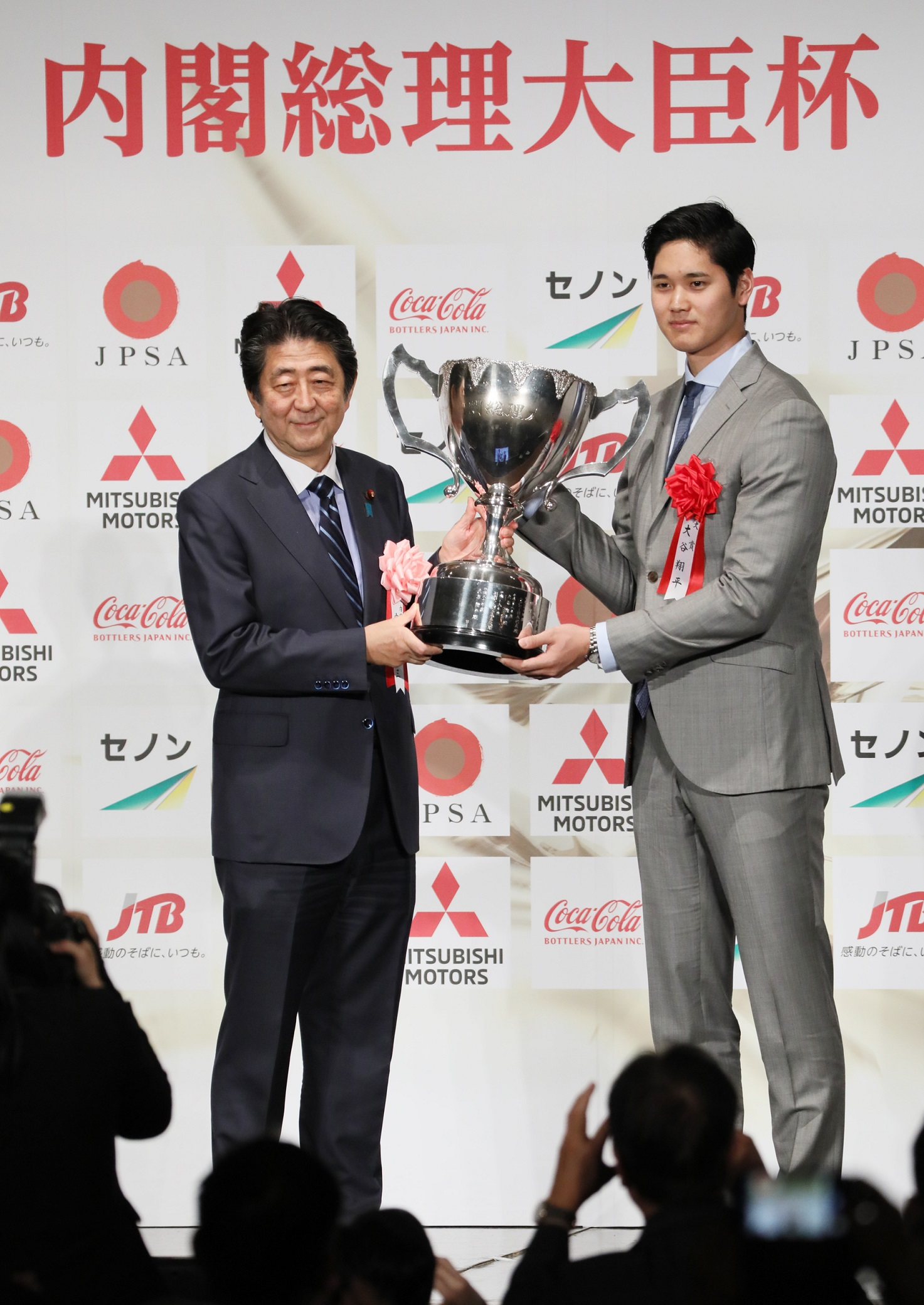
Shinzo Abe awarding Shohei Ohtani the Prime Minister Trophy at the 2018 Japan Professional Sports Grand Prize Award Ceremony

Japan Professional Sports Grand Prize (日本プロスポーツ大賞, Nippon Puro Supōtsu Taisyō) is given to one sportsperson or sports team every year since 1968 by the Japan Professional Sports Association. The award is one of the most prestigious all-sport awards in Japanese sport. The recordholders are the baseball players Ichiro Suzuki and Sadaharu Oh (three awards). A committee of representatives from Tokyo newspapers, wire services, television and radio for sports media are responsible for making the selections. The winner is given the Prime Minister Trophy.

From 2019 to 2021, the awards was discontinued due to problems within the Japan Professional Sports Association.

== List of winners ==
Year	Winner	Sport
1968	Shozo Saijo	Boxing
1969	Yomiuri Giants	Baseball
1970	Taihō Kōki	Sumo
1971	Shigeo Nagashima	Baseball
1972	Katsuaki Matsumoto	Bicycle racing
1973	Tadashi Sawamura	Kickboxing
1974	(Taiwan) Sadaharu Oh	Baseball
1975	Hiroshima Toyo Carp	Baseball
1976	(Taiwan) Sadaharu Oh	Baseball
1977	(Taiwan) Sadaharu Oh	Baseball
1978	Yakult Swallows	Baseball
1979	Yoko Gushiken	Boxing
1980	Yoko Gushiken	Boxing
1981	Koichi Nakano	Bicycle racing
1982	Hiromitsu Ochiai	Baseball
1983	Tatsuro Hirooka	Baseball
1984	Sachio Kinugasa	Baseball
1985	(United States) Randy Bass	Baseball
1986	Hiromitsu Ochiai	Baseball
1987	Ayako Okamoto	Golf
1988	Chiyonofuji Mitsugu	Sumo
1989	Chiyonofuji Mitsugu	Sumo
1990	Hideo Nomo	Baseball
1991	Joichiro Tatsuyoshi	Boxing
1992	Takanohana Kōji	Sumo
1993	Kazuyoshi Miura	Football
1994	Ichiro Suzuki	Baseball
1995	Ichiro Suzuki	Baseball
1996	Masashi Ozaki	Golf
1997	Hidetoshi Nakata	Football
1998	Kazuhiro Sasaki	Baseball
1999	Daisuke Matsuzaka	Baseball
2000	Hideki Matsui	Baseball
2001	Ichiro Suzuki	Baseball
2002	Japan national football team	Football
2003	Hideki Matsui	Baseball
2004	(Mongolia) Asashōryū Akinori	Sumo
2005	(Mongolia) Asashōryū Akinori	Sumo
2006	Japan national baseball team	Baseball
2007	Urawa Red Diamonds	Football
2008	Ryo Ishikawa	Golf
2009	Ryo Ishikawa	Golf
2010	(Mongolia) Hakuhō Shō	Sumo
2011	Japan women's national football team	Football
2012	Shinnosuke Abe	Baseball
2013	Masahiro Tanaka	Baseball
2014	Kei Nishikori	Tennis
2015	Japan national rugby union team	Rugby union
2016	Shohei Ohtani	Baseball
2017	Fukuoka SoftBank Hawks	Baseball
2018	Shohei Ohtani	Baseball
Not Awarded
2022	Naoya Inoue	Boxing
2023	Japan national baseball team	Baseball
2024	Haruka Kitaguchi	Javelin throw
2025	Yoshinobu Yamamoto	Baseball

=== Wins by sports ===
Sport	# of Awards
Baseball	28
Sumo	7
Football	5
Boxing	5
Golf	4
Bicycle racing	2
Kickboxing	1
Tennis	1
Rugby union	1
Javelin throw	1
