= Auto Race (Japanese sport) =

Japanese paved flat track motorcycle racing

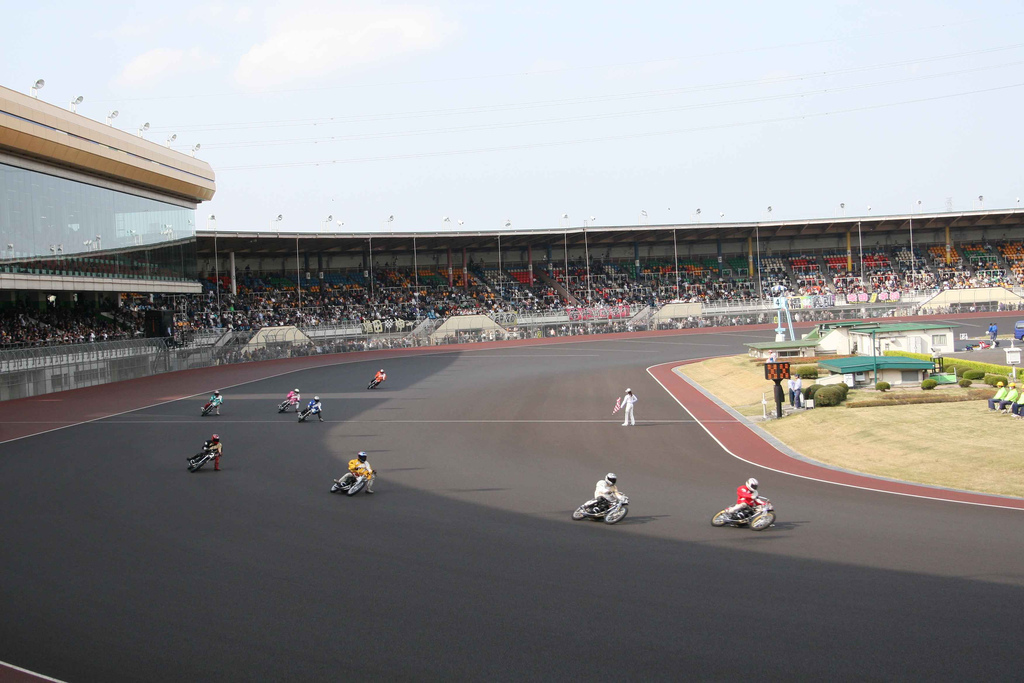
- Auto Race competitors cross the finish line at Kawaguchi Auto Race Circuit

Characteristics
- Contact: Contact
- Type: Outdoor

Auto Race (オートレース, Ōto Rēsu) is a Japanese version of flat track motorcycle racing, but is held on an asphalt course. It is regulated by the JKA Foundation.

Paved flat track is predominantly a gambling sport. The first ever meeting was held at Funabashi in 1950, but the more traditional speedway and flat track dirt surfaces were banned by the government in the 1960s because they were considered too dangerous.

Unlike other forms of motorcycle and gambling sport, riders are required to live at a dormitory with over 500 riders prior to race day, and refrain from making contact with the outside world. This is designed to prevent race fixing, which scandalised the sport during the years when it was taken over by the yakuza, most notably the Black Mist Scandal where NPB players and flat track racers conspired to manipulate races; as a result, crowds dwindled and it was saved when a motorcycle federation took it over in 1967. Since then the sport has very much gone its own way to develop into a form of motor sport exclusive to Japan, as it has differences between that and motorcycle speedway and flat track.

Auto Race competitions are held on tarmac tracks, and usually involve eight riders and runs for six laps. The hard surface dictates riders lean round the corners rather similar to motorcycle road racing, than slide as in conventional Speedway, the sport from which Autorace was derived. A typical Auto Race bike is 599cc and has a two-speed gearbox. As in Speedway, the bikes have no brakes and are designed with the left handlebar higher than the right in order to help maintain stability while leaning the machine on the banked oval circuit.

As well as their real names, all the riders have an alias, or nickname, which they go by. All are trained in official training schools and have to pass a qualifying examination before being allowed to become competitive riders. Once qualified, riders are graded according to their results and these grades are used to ascertain racing positions, with the higher graded riders starting from the back grids. Riders are identifiable by number and vest colour. An average rider usually spends half a year living away from home. Between races, the bike is kept together with other bikes.

The sport also inspired a manga series, Speed Star (スピードスター), written by Shinya Iihoshi and published in Young King from 2005 to 2007.

== See also ==
- Gambling in Japan
- Keirin
