= Kick no Oni =

Japanese manga series

キックの鬼
- Manga
- Written by: Ikki Kajiwara
- Illustrated by: Kentaro Nakajou
- Published by: Shōnen Gahōsha
- Magazine: Shōnen King
- Original run: August 1969 – February 1971
- Volumes: 6
- Anime television series
- Directed by: Yoshifumi Hatano
- Produced by: Masaharu Eto
- Written by: Masaki Tsuji
- Music by: Asei Kobayashi
- Studio: Toei Animation
- Original network: JNN (TBS)
- Original run: October 2, 1970 – March 26, 1971
- Episodes: 26

Kick no Oni (キックの鬼ー, Kikku no Oni; lit. Demon's Kick), also known as The Demon of Kickboxing, is a manga written by Ikki Kajiwara and illustrated by Kentaro Nakajou. It is based on the life of the kickboxer Tadashi Sawamura.

== History ==
Written by Ikki Kajiwara and illustrated by Kentaro Nakajou, the manga was published in 1969 in the magazine Shōnen King. It received an anime television series in 1970 that ran until 1971 by Toei Animation. Ikki Kajiwara is known for his other sports manga, one of them, Ashita no Joe, is illustrated by Tetsuya Chiba and was published between 1968 and 1973 in Weekly Shōnen Magazine. The staff at Toei found it easier to animate Oni after gaining experience with physical contact sports anime Tiger Mask (also written by Kajiwara).

In 1970, the manga was turned into an anime series, comprising 26 episodes. It's theme song was composed by Asei Kobayashi. Though it met with little commercial success in Japan, it became a cult favourite anime in Brazil.

== Plot ==
The series chronicled the true story of kickboxer Tadashi Sawamura.

In this series, Tadashi Sawamura, was an arrogant karate fighter who was defeated by a kickboxer, leaving Sawamura in a mild coma. Once in the hospital and recovering from the coma, his opponent's kickboxing trainer Noguchi, came to his hospital room and convinced Sawamura to become a kickboxer. To which after some rigorous training barefoot, he learned a devastating finishing move: "The Jumping Vacuum Knee" (Shinku tobi hiza geri).

== Cast ==
- Koji Asakura as Tadashi Sawamura
- Kiyoshi Kobayashi as Osamu Noguchi
- Michiko Nomura as Etsuko
- Minori Matsushima as Youko
- Yuuji Nishimoto as Hideki
