= Katsuaki Matsumoto =

Japanese cyclist (1928–2021)

- Born: 5 March 1928; Kyoto Prefecture, Japan
- Died: 6 March 2021 (aged 93); Kyoto Prefecture, Japan
- Occupation: track cyclist
- Known for: keirin racing
- Awards: Japan Professional Sports Grand Prize (1972)

Katsuaki Matsumoto (松本勝明, Matsumoto Katsuaki; 5 March 1928 in Kyoto Prefecture – 6 March 2021) was a Japanese professional track racing cyclist.

Matsumoto is the leading all-time winner amongst professional Keirin track racers with a career total of 1341 wins.

Matsumoto started as a cyclist in 1949, and won the national keirin championships in 1954 and 1955. He retired from racing on 1 October 1981. After retirement he trained young cyclists. He became an honorary citizen of Kyoto in 1987.

Matsumoto died on 6 March 2021 from lymphoma.
