= Ricky Lopez =

American boxer

Ricky López
Personal information
- Born: Ricky López; March 3, 1987 (age 39) Denver, Colorado, U.S.
- Height: 4 ft 11 in (174 cm)
- Weight: Super bantamweight

Boxing career
- Reach: 71 in (181 cm)
- Stance: Orthodox

Boxing record
- Total fights: 11
- Wins: 9
- Win by KO: 4
- Losses: 2

Ricky López (born March 3, 1987) is an American professional boxer who fights in the super bantamweight weight class.

== Professional career ==
On May 9, 2009 López took out the veteran Nick Arellano by K.O. to win his professional debut.

== See also ==
- Notable boxing families
