= Frankie Baltazar =

American boxer

Personal information
- Nickname: Matador
- Nationality: American
- Born: April 14, 1958 (age 68) Los Angeles, California
- Height: 5 ft 8 in (173 cm)
- Weight: Lightweight; Super featherweight

Boxing career
- Reach: 70 in (178 cm)
- Stance: Southpaw

Boxing record
- Total fights: 44
- Wins: 40
- Win by KO: 27
- Losses: 3
- Draws: 1
- No contests: 0

Frankie Baltazar (born April 14, 1958) is a Mexican American former professional boxer who competed from 1976 to 1991.

== Early life ==
Frankie is the brother of former boxers Robert Baltazar and Tony Baltazar.

The Baltazar brothers were trained and managed by their father, Frank Baltazar Sr.

== Professional career ==
Baltazar unsuccessfully challenged Rafael Limón for the NABF super featherweight title in 1980. On June 17, 1983 he beat title contender Juan Escobar.

== See also ==
- Notable boxing families
