= Robert Baltazar =

American boxer

Personal information
- Nickname: Bobby
- Nationality: American
- Born: Robert Edward Baltazar; January 16, 1963 (age 63) Los Angeles, California
- Height: 5 ft 10 in (179 cm)
- Weight: Welterweight; Light Welterweight

Boxing career
- Reach: 72 in (183 cm)
- Stance: Orthodox

Boxing record
- Total fights: 5
- Wins: 5
- Win by KO: 5
- Losses: 0
- Draws: 0
- No contests: 0

Robert Edward Baltazar (born January 16, 1963) is a former Mexican American professional boxer in the Welterweight division.

== Early life ==
Robert is the brother of former boxers Frankie Baltazar and Tony Baltazar.

The Baltazar brothers, Frankie, Tony and Bobby were trained and managed by father, Frank Baltazar Sr.

== Professional career ==
On February 8, 1985 Baltazar beat the veteran Larry Yazzie to win his professional debut.

== See also ==
- Notable boxing families
