= Keirin =

Form of motor-paced cycle racing

Keirin (ケイリン)
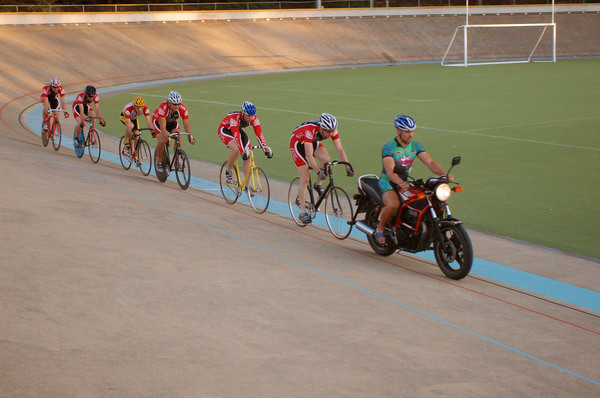
- Keirin in Colwood, British Columbia, July 2006
- Highest governing body: Union Cycliste Internationale (UCI) and JKA Foundation (Japanese regulating body)
- Year originated: 1948 in Kitakyushu, Fukuoka, Japan

Characteristics
- Type: Track cycling
- Venue: velodrome

Presence
- Olympic: 2000, 2004, 2008, 2012, 2016, 2020, 2024

KEIRIN Logomark

Keirin (競輪 / ケイリン; [keːɾiɴ]) – "racing track" – is a form of motor-paced cycle racing in which track cyclists sprint for victory following a speed-controlled start behind a motorised or non-motorised pacer. It was developed in Japan around 1948 for gambling purposes, and became an official event at the 2000 Olympics in Sydney, Australia.

== Overview ==
Keirin race in Kanagawa, 2023

Riders use brakeless fixed-gear bicycles. Races are typically 1.5 kilometres (0.93 mi) long: 6 laps on a 250 m (270 yd) track, 4 laps on a 333 m (364 yd) track, or 4 laps on a 400 m (440 yd) track. Lots are drawn to determine starting positions for the sprint riders behind the pacer, which is usually a motorcycle, but can be a derny, electric bicycle or tandem bicycle. Riders must remain behind the pacer for 3 laps on a 250 m (270 yd) track. The pacer starts at 30 km/h (19 mph), gradually increasing to 50 km/h (31 mph) by its final circuit. The pacer leaves the track 750 m (820 yd) —3 laps on a 250 m (270 yd) track— before the end of the race. The winner's finishing speed can exceed 70 km/h (43 mph).

Competition keirin races are conducted over several rounds with one final. Some eliminated cyclists can try again in the repechages.

=== Race track ===
Keirin takes place on an in- or outdoors track, which is oval-shaped and divided into specific areas:

- two straightaways (homestretch and backstretch)
- four turns (corners)
- two locations called the "centre", referring to the area between corners 1 and 2 (centre 1) and corners 3 and 4 (centre 2)

The track contains several race lines perpendicular to the track:

- Backstretch line
- Homestretch line
- 30-metre line
- 25-metre line

And also oval shaped lines parallel to the track:

- Outer line
- Inner line
- Yellow line
- Side line

== World championships ==
Keirin, in its modified form, has been a UCI men's World Championship event since 1980 and a UCI women's World Championship event since 2002. Danny Clark of Australia and Li Na of China were the first UCI world champions. The 2019 men's and women's world champions are Matthijs Büchli of the Netherlands and Lee Wai Sze of Hong Kong.

== Olympics ==
Keirin made its debut at the 2000 Summer Olympics in Sydney as a men's event, after being admitted into the Olympics in December 1996. The women's event was added for the 2012 Summer Olympics in London.

A BBC News investigation, reported in July 2008, raised concerns about the nature of the 1996 admission for the 2000 Olympics by the world cycling body, Union Cycliste Internationale (UCI). It had found evidence that in the late 1990s, following the admission, the Japan Keirin Association (JKA) had subsequently paid a total of US$3 million (approximately £1.5M or €2.6M) to the UCI. The UCI and its then-president, Hein Verbruggen, denied any wrongdoing.

At the Tokyo 2020 Olympics, the Men's keirin took place on 7 and 8 August 2021, with 30 cyclists from 18 nations competing, and the gold medal going to Jason Kenny from Great Britain. The Women's keirin took place on 4 and 5 August 2021, with 29 cyclists from 18 nations competing, and the gold medal going to Shanne Braspennincx from the Netherlands.

Men

Olympics	Men's Champion
2000	Florian Rousseau (FRA)
2004	Ryan Bayley (AUS)
2008	Chris Hoy (GBR)
2012	Chris Hoy (GBR)
2016	Jason Kenny (GBR)
2020	Jason Kenny (GBR)
2024	Harrie Lavreysen (NED)

Women

Olympics	Women's Champion
2012	Victoria Pendleton (GBR)
2016	Elis Ligtlee (NED)
2020	Shanne Braspennincx (NED)
2024	Ellesse Andrews (NZL)

== Keirin in Japan ==
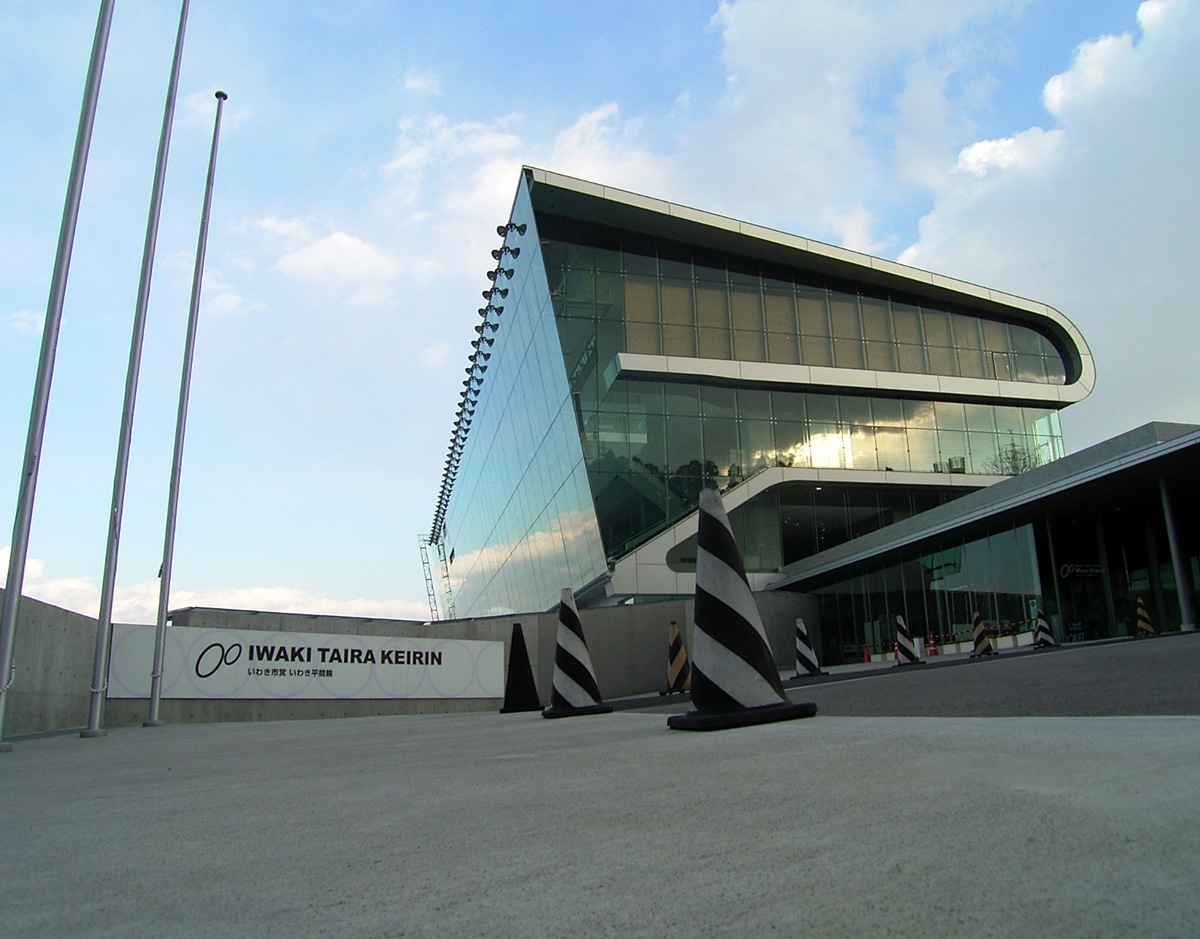
The entrance and grandstand at the Iwaki-Taira Velodrome in Iwaki, Fukushima

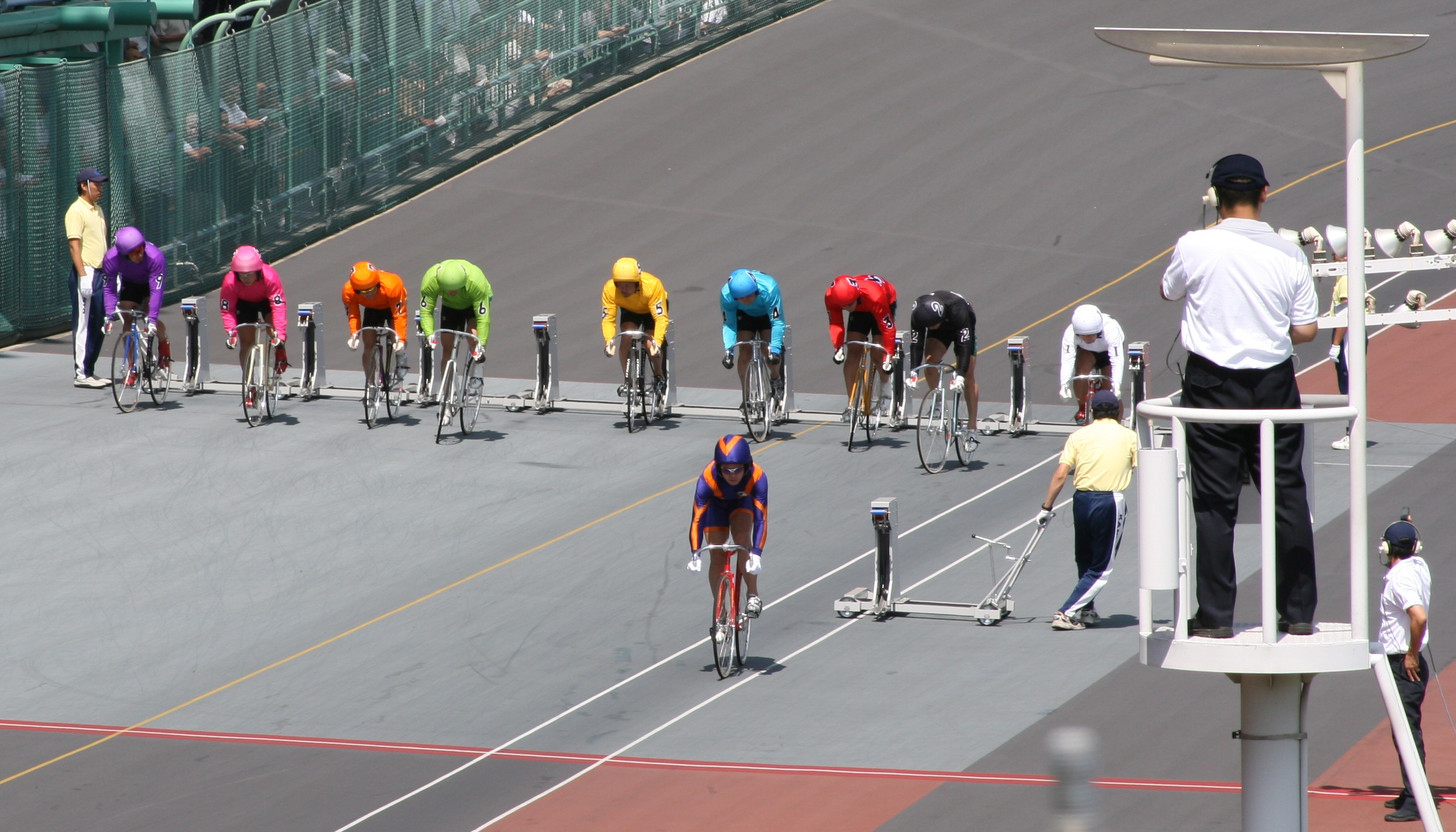
Start of a race at Tachikawa Velodrome in Tokyo. Riders start from the blocks and pace up to speed behind the pacer, wearing purple and orange. A referee observes the start in the tower to the right.

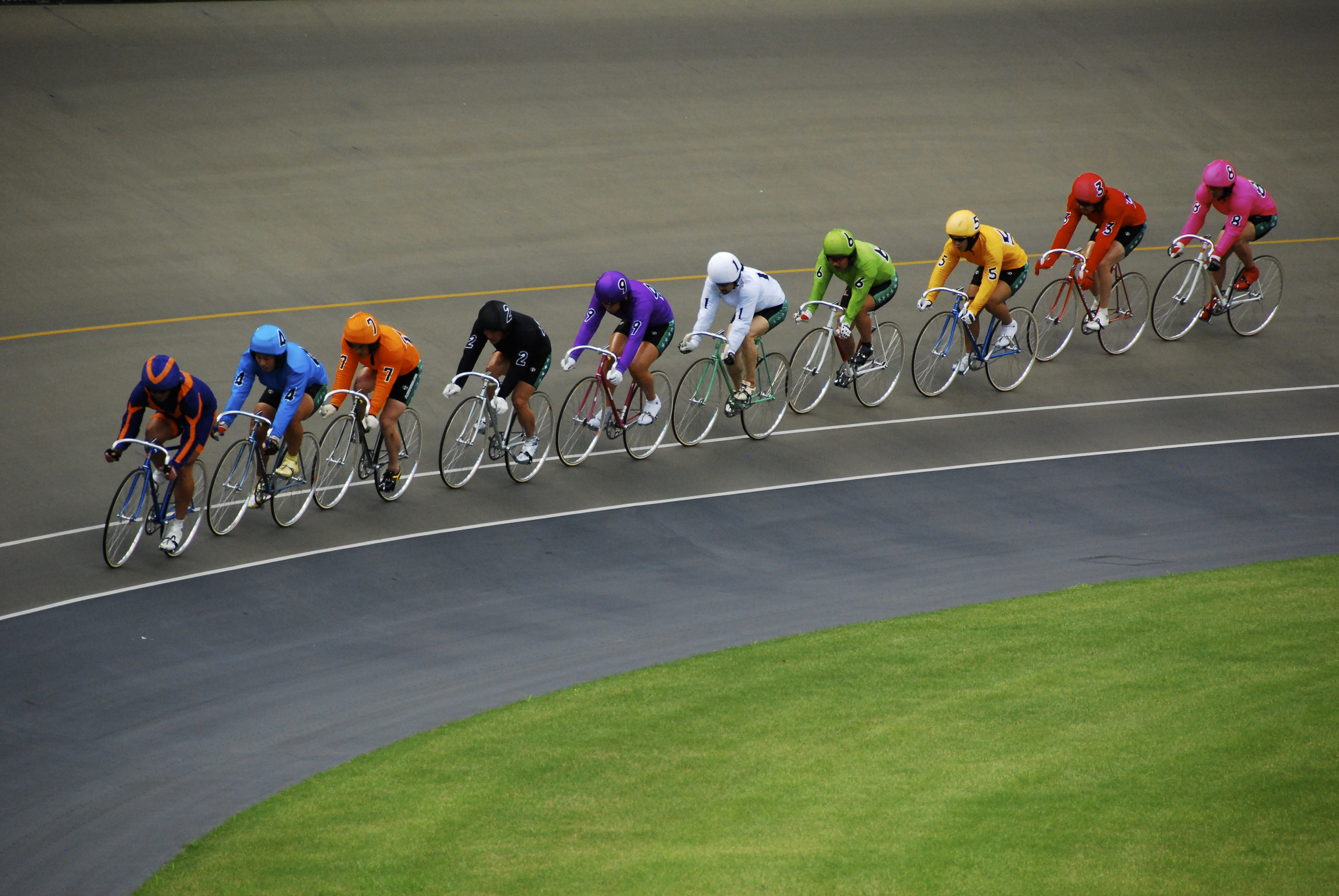
During a race at Ōmiya Velodrome in Saitama, the nine racers form a line behind the pacer as they go around a corner.

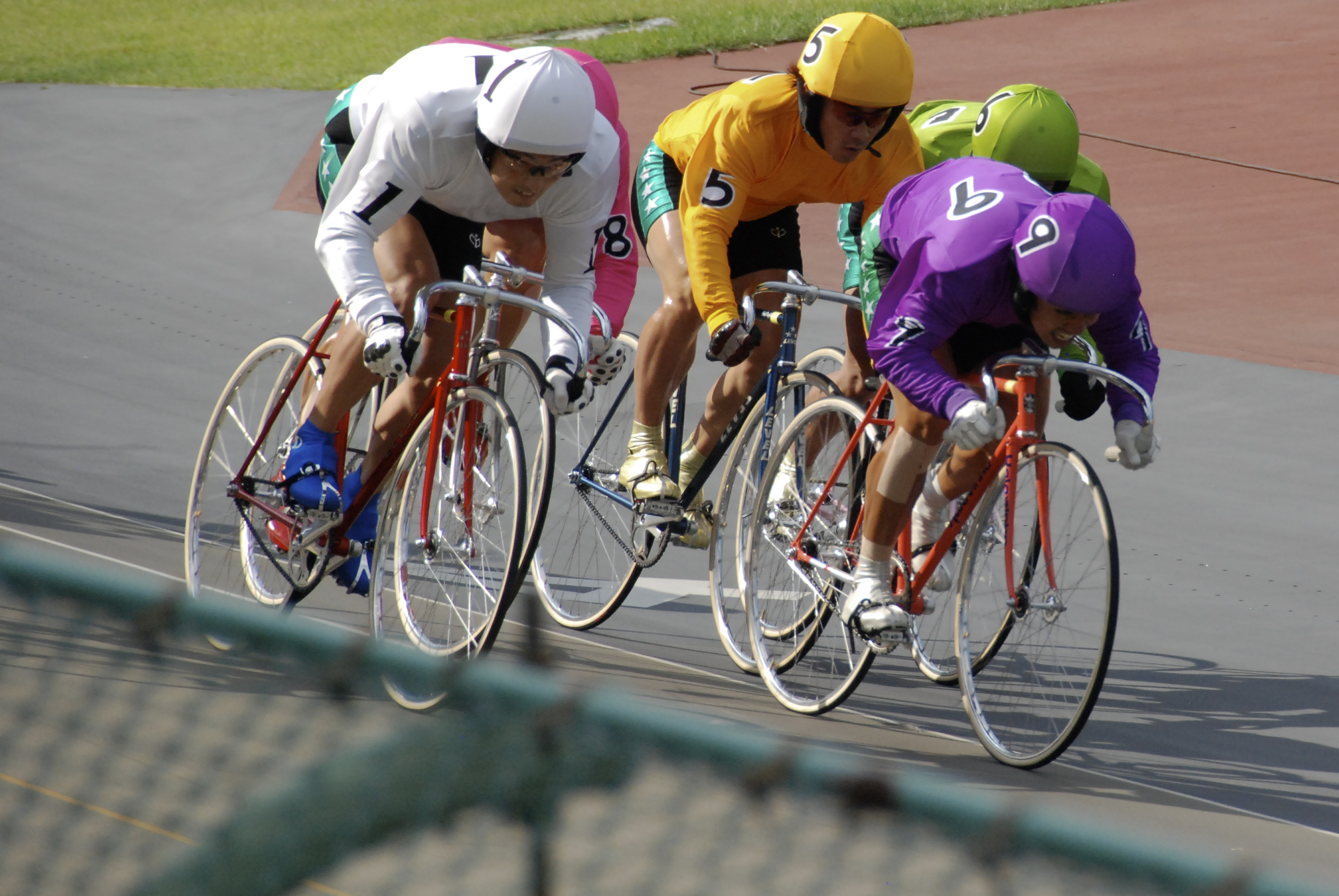
Racers sprinting to the finish line in the last lap of a race at the Ōmiya Velodrome

=== History ===
Track cycling began as one of four allowed betting sports in Japan in 1948, and has since become very popular there. In 1957, the Nihon Jitensha Shinkōkai (NJS; Japan Bicycle Association) was founded to establish a uniform system of standards for the sport in Japan. Today keirin racing is regulated by the JKA Foundation. In 2011, the sum of bets placed on keirin races exceeded ¥600 billion (approximately €5.4B or US$5B), and the number of attendees in the races was approximately 4.9 million people.

Aspiring professional keirin riders in Japan compete for entrance into the Japan Keirin School. The 10% of applicants who are accepted then undergo a strict 15-hours-per-day training regimen. Those who pass final examination must still be approved by the Japan Keirin Association before being allowed to compete.

Japanese races for women were reintroduced in July 2012, under the title of "Girls Keirin" (ガールズケイリン). Women were previously permitted to participate from 1949 until 1964. Like the men, the women must also undergo a strict training regimen at the Keirin School.

=== Champions from Japan ===
Koichi Nakano (中野 浩一, Nakano Kōichi) was one of the first Japanese keirin athletes to compete outside of his native country, Nakano holds the best matched sprint record as a track cyclist at the UCI Track World Championships with a record of ten consecutive professional Sprint World Track Cycling Championship wins from 1977 to 1986 against mostly western European pro track cyclists, although he never won the Keirin World Championship. At that time, many leading sprint riders were from the Eastern bloc countries and competed in separate "amateur" events.

Katsuaki Matsumoto (1928–2021) is the all-time professional keirin athlete with the most wins (1341) over his career. He retired in 1981 at the age of 53.

=== Typical race ===
Keirin races in Japan begin with the cyclists parading to the starting blocks, bowing as they enter the track and again as they position their bikes for the start of the race. Every participant is assigned a number and a colour for identification and betting purposes.

At the sound of the gun, the cyclists leave their starting blocks and settle into a position behind the pacer, who is another keirin bicyclist wearing purple with orange stripes. Cyclists initially settle into different groups, referred to as "lines", where they try to work together with others to maximise their chance of winning.

As the pace quickens, the pacer will usually depart the track with between one and two laps remaining, though the actual location where the pacer leaves varies with every race. With 1 1/2 laps remaining, officials begin sounding a bell or gong, increasing in frequency until the bicyclists come around to begin the final lap.

The race is monitored by referees. Two of the referees are stationed in towers along the backstretch (2nd and 3rd corners), while others review the homestretch area from a control room using closed-circuit cameras. Once the race has finished, a referee can signal a possible rule violation by illuminating a red light at the corner nearest to where the infraction may have occurred, or by waving a red flag. Judges then examine the video of the race and decide if a competitor committed a rules violation and should be disqualified. Once the order of finish is finalised, the race is declared official and the winning bets are paid.

=== Ranks ===
There are a total of six ranks that competitors can obtain in Japanese keirin racing. SS is the highest rank, followed by S1, S2, A1, A2 and A3. All new keirin graduates begin their careers with an A3 rank and work their way up by competing in keirin events.

The colour of the shorts worn by each keirin competitor indicates rank. Those in A-class (A1, A2, A3) wear black shorts with a green stripe and white stars. S-class competitors (S1 and S2) wear a red stripe instead of a green stripe. Those in the elite SS class wear red shorts with a black stripe, white stars and special insignia. Introduced in 2007, the SS ranking is assigned by the NJS every December to the top nine Keirin athletes. These nine compete in that year's Keirin Grand Prix and retain their rank until the following December.

=== Distances ===
The distance of each race depends on gender and rank. For men, distances for those ranked A3 are at 1,600m, while all others compete at 2,000m. The finals of some of the top graded events are run at a longer distance of 2,400m. The season-ending Keirin Grand Prix is held at 2,800m.

All events for women are currently run at 1,600m. There are usually small variances in distance based on the size of the track.

=== Race grades ===
A race meeting at any given keirin velodrome in Japan is assigned a grade. The highest graded events are GP, GI (G1), GII (G2) and GIII (G3), reserved only for S-class riders. Underneath those are FI (F1) events, which are open to both S-class and A-class riders. The lowest graded events, FII (F2), are reserved for A-class riders.

The GP grade designation is reserved for the Keirin Grand Prix, a three-day meet held at the end of December for the year's top keirin competitors. The meet ultimately concludes with the Grand Prix race itself, which determines the annual Keirin racing champion.

As of 2018, a selection committee determines the competitors for the Grand Prix race using the following priority:

- Winners of each of the six GI events during the year,
- Japanese medal winners of individual cycling events during the Summer Olympic Games, or in non-Olympic years, the UCI Track Cycling World Championships,
- Competitors specifically recognised by the selection committee, and
- Competitors that have earned the most prize money from Keirin events during the year.

Also part of the Grand Prix meet is the Young Grand Prix, which is open to the best of those that have begun competing in Keirin within the last three years; it is the only Keirin race of the year in which both S-class and A-class compete in the same race. A new addition to the meet in 2012 was the Girls' Grand Prix for the sport's top female competitors.

Another prestigious event on the annual keirin racing calendar is the GI Japan Championship. Held every May over a period of six days, it is the longest single race meeting of the year.

Each of the keirin velodromes are generally permitted to host one event per year of either GI, GII or GIII designation. The remaining events at each track consist of a combination of FI and FII races for a total of approximately 70 race days per year. On average there is one GI or GII event every month and one GIII meeting per week on the annual calendar.

=== Top Keirin events ===
As of 2024, the top events on the Keirin racing calendar are as follows:

Month	Grade	Event
February	GI	Yomiuri Shimbun All-Japan Keirin Cup (読売新聞社杯全日本選抜競輪)
March	GII	Winners Cup (ウィナーズカップ)
April	GI	All-Girls' Classic※ (オールガールズクラシック)
May	GI	Japan Championship Keirin (日本選手権競輪)
June	GI	Prince Takamatsu Memorial Cup (高松宮記念杯競輪)
June	GI	Pearl Cup※ (パールカップ)
July	GII	Summer Night Festival (サマーナイトフェスティバル)
August	GI	All-Star Keirin (オールスター競輪)
August	GI（only 2024:FII）	Women's All-Star Keirin※ (女子オールスター競輪)
September	GII	Kyodo News Service Cup (共同通信社杯競輪)
October	GI	Prince Tomohito Cup/World Championship Tournament (寛仁親王牌・世界選手権記念トーナメント)
November	GI	Asahi Shimbunsha Cup Keirin Festival (朝日新聞社杯競輪祭)
November	GI	Keirin Festival Women's Championship※ (競輪祭女子王座戦)
December	GP	Keirin Grand Prix (KEIRINグランプリ)
December	GII	Young Grand Prix (ヤンググランプリ)
December	GP	Odds Park Cup Girl's Grand Prix※ (オッズパーク杯ガールズグランプリ)
※=Girls Keirin

=== Race schedule ===
Keirin velodromes follow the same basic schedule of races when conducting a race meeting. On the first day of competition, the better keirin competitors are assigned to races of higher calibre, while others are assigned to low-calibre races. Keirin racers are guaranteed to compete on each day of the meeting unless they are disqualified from a race or withdraw from the meeting for any reason — in which case alternate competitors are called up to fill in the lower-calibre races.

Below is a schedule of races conducted during a typical three-day FI event (open to both S-class and A-class riders).

==== Day 1 ====
- Races 1–5: A-class Preliminary (A級 予選, A-kyū yosen) (low-calibre)
  - First four or five finishers in each race advance to Day 2 Semi-finals
- Race 6: A-class Special (A級 特選, A-kyū tokusen) (high-calibre)
  - All riders compete in Day 2 Semi-finals

After six races, S-class riders compete:

- Races 7–10: S-class Preliminary (S級 予選, S-kyū yosen)
  - First three or four finishers in each race advance to Day 2 Semi-finals
- Race 11: S-class Special (S級 特選, S-kyū tokusen)
  - All riders compete in Day 2 Semi-finals

==== Day 2 ====
- Races 1–2: A-class General (A級 一般, A-kyū ippan)
  - First two finishers in each race advance to Day 3 Special
- Race 3: A-class Selection (A級 選抜, A-kyū senbatsu)
  - First five finishers advance to Day 3 Special
- Races 4–6: A-class Semi-finals (A級 準決勝, A-kyū junkesshō)
  - First three finishers in each race advance to Day 3 Final

S-class riders then compete to advance:

- Races 7–8: S-class General (S級 一般, S-kyū ippan)
  - First one or two finishers in each race advance to Day 3 Special
- Races 9–11: S-class Semi-finals (S級 準決勝, S-kyū junkesshō)
  - First three finishers in each race advance to Day 3 Final

==== Day 3 ====
- Races 1–2: A-class General (A級 一般, A-kyū ippan)
- Races 3–5: A-class Special (A級 特選, A-kyū tokusen)
- Races 6–7: S-class General (S級 一般, S-kyū ippan)
- Race 8: S-class Special (S級 特選, S-kyū tokusen)
- Race 9: A-class Final (A級 決勝, A-kyū kesshō)
- Race 10: S-class Special (S級 特選, S-kyū tokusen)
- Race 11: S-class Final (S級 決勝, S-kyū kesshō)

=== Betting ===
Bets that can be made on Keirin races include, but are not limited to:

- Exacta (2車単, nishatan) – selecting the first two finishers in exact order
- Quinella (2車複, nishafuku) – first two finishers in any order
- Trifecta (3連単, sanrentan) – first three finishers in exact order
- Trio (3連複, sanrenpuku) – first three finishers in any order
- Quinella Place, or wide (ワイド, waido) - selecting two to finish in the top three, in any order.

Some wagers cannot be placed if there is a small number of competitors in the race.

During major race meets, some jackpot wagers are offered:

- Dokanto! 4 two – selecting the exacta in four consecutive (typically the last four) races.
- Dokanto! 7 – this is what would be called a Pick 7 in horse racing in that the bettor selects the winner of each of the last seven races of the day.

The money bet into the Dokanto wagers can carry over if there are no winning tickets, even to subsequent race meets at another velodrome in the country.

In extraordinary circumstances, races have been declared no-contests, forcing velodromes to refund millions of yen in bets. Such results are generally known as a failure (不成立, fuseiritsu). A race at Shizuoka velodrome on 2 January 2008 was declared a failure when the back wheel of the pacer's bicycle nicked the bicycle of an actual competitor, causing him to fall. In a race at Iwaki-Taira Velodrome on 14 December 2008, separate infractions resulted in the disqualification of the entire field; all but one of the competitors were handed a one-year suspension by the velodrome after the race. The suspensions were lifted four months later.

=== Equipment ===
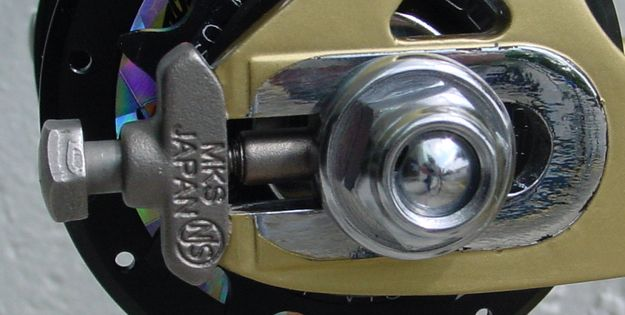
Mikashima chain-tug with NJS stamp

As a result of the parimutuel gambling that surrounds keirin racing in Japan, the Nihon Jitensha Shinkōkai (NJS; Japanese Bicycle Association)— now under the JKA Foundation— developed a strict system of standards for bicycles and tools to ensure that no rider will have any advantage based on equipment. All components must be made using NJS-approved materials and techniques, and the frames themselves must be handmade by an NJS-certified builder. For example, the bicycles frames used in Japanese Keirin races must be made from chromoly steel using traditional techniques like brazing, and wheels must have exactly 36 spokes per wheel.

Popular frame manufacturers include Nagasawa, 3Rensho, Makino, Kalavinka, Level, Bridgestone, Panasonic, and Samson. Other components come from Japanese manufacturers like Shimano, Nitto, Hatta, MKS, Kashimax, and Sugino. Because the primary goal of the NJS is to support the Japanese manufacturing industry, its bureaucracy is typically resistant to the certification of foreign manufacturers' components. The few exceptions to this are Italian cycling equipment manufacturers Campagnolo and Cinelli, which received NJS certification for some components.

Exceptions to these rules include Girls' Keirin and Keirin Evolution. Girls' Keirin allows for a limited set of non-NJS tires, stems, saddles, and carbon-fibre frames and wheels. Manufacturers of the frames used in Girls' Keirin are Boma, Bridgestone, Gan Well, Kalavinka, Bomber, and MBK. Keirin Evolution participants may use any frames or components approved by the NJS, UCI, or JCF. NJS-approved equipment is not required for keirin races sanctioned by the UCI or its local national sporting associations, including UCI-sanctioned races in Japan.

The NJS standard does not necessarily relate to quality or standard of manufacture, though NJS-approved equipment often sells for more than comparable equipment because of its niche use, strict build requirements, and finite availability.

== See also ==
- Motor-paced racing
- Single-speed bicycle
- UCI Track Cycling World Championships – Men's sprint
- UCI Track Cycling World Championships – Men's keirin
- UCI Track Cycling World Championships – Women's keirin
- BMX racing
- Auto Race (Japanese sport)
