= Tadashi Sawamura =

Japanese kickboxer (1943–2021)

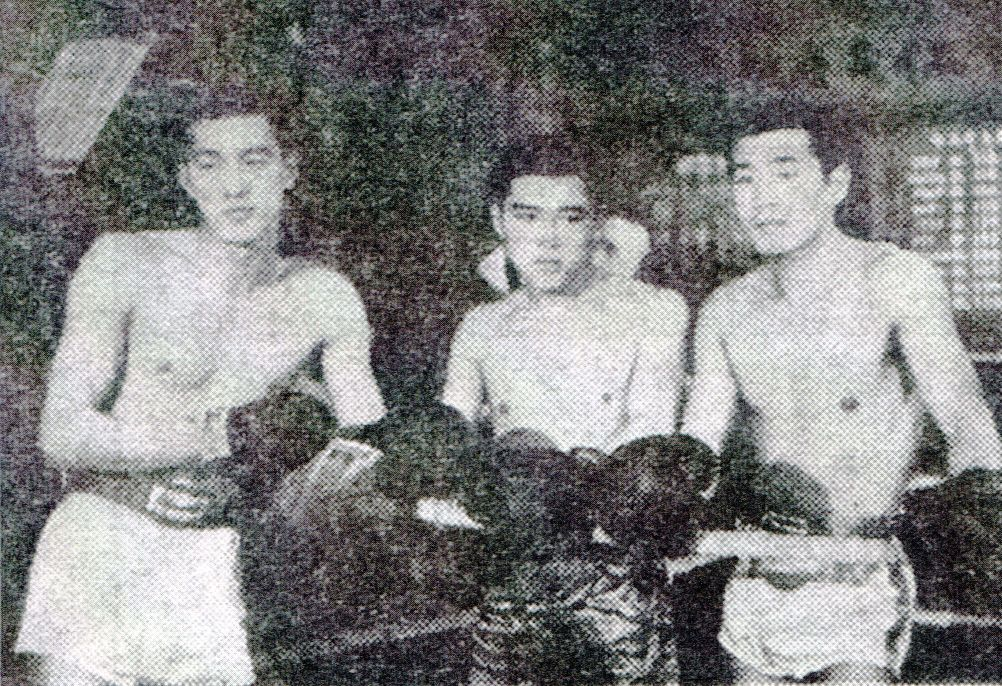
- Sawamura (right) with Isao Fujimoto (left) and Isao Kikuchi (center)
- Born: Hideki Shiraha 白羽秀樹; January 5, 1943; Manchukuo
- Died: March 26, 2021 (aged 78); Japan, Chiba prefecture
- Native name: 沢村忠
- Other names: Kick no Oni (Demon of the kick), Keri no shiraha (Kicking white feathers)
- Nationality: (Japan) Japanese
- Height: 174 cm (5 ft 9 in)
- Division: Lightweight; Welterweight; Middleweight
- Style: Kickboxing, Karate, Muay Thai
- Years active: 1966–1973

Kickboxing record
- Total: 241
- Wins: 232
- By knockout: 228
- Losses: 5
- Draws: 4

Tadashi Sawamura (沢村 忠, Sawamura Tadashi; January 5, 1943 – March 26, 2021) was a Japanese kickboxer whose real name was Hideki Shiraha (白羽 秀樹, Shiraha Hideki). He is often credited with sparking the "Shōwa era kickboxing boom", being one of the era's most popular Japanese fighters, and enjoying great fame throughout his career.

== Biography ==
=== Early life ===
Hideki Shiraha was born in Manchukuo in 1943. In his youth, he studied Gōjū-ryū-style Karate and some Chinese Martial Arts from his grandfather. As a child, he was part of a children's theater company called "Theatrical Company Broad Bean" (gekidan sora mame - 劇団そらまめ), with aspirations of becoming an actor in the future.

When he was in the third year of junior high school, he was scouted to Shintoho Studios as part of their "Shintoho Starlet" program. He had appeared in TV dramas under the stage name "Tetsuya Shiro", but due to the bankruptcy of Shintoho, he was forced to suspend his career in the entertainment industry.

Subsequently, he graduated from Hosei University Junior and Senior High School and joined Daiei Film Company. He enrolled in the Film Department of Nihon University College of Art as part of his training at Daiei. Around this time, he seemed to have given up his career as an actor and pursued to become a screenwriter. On the other hand, he had also joined the Goju-ryu Karate Club at university and won the All Japan Student Championship while he was still in school. He was undefeated in 60 fights.

In 1963 there was a competitive match between leading Japanese and Thai instructors, a karate vs Muay Thai tournament. Japan won the series although two of the Japanese participants Osamu Noguchi and Tatsuo Yamada wanted to create a full-contact sport similar to how Muay Thai is a sport in Thailand, and they started to create kickboxing.

Shiraha came to attention of Osamu Noguchi, who praised Shiraha's ability. Noguchi had invited Shiraha to pursue kickboxing, telling Shihara that "the sports version of karate doesn't have the training to win in a full-contact fight" and that "[Shiraha] would lose if he traveled to Thailand to compete in full-contact". Shiraha eventually left Daiei Film Company at the same time as graduating from college and started training at the Noguchi Gym.

=== Kickboxing career ===
The Japan Kickboxing Association was launched in April 1966, with Shiraha debuting as a professional kickboxer on April 11, 1966, under the ring name "Tadashi Sawamura". The ring name was chosen after Kyokushin fighter Tadashi Nakamura, who defeated a Muay Thai fighter by KO at Lumpinee Stadium in 1964 as a representative of Japan and Karate.

Sawamura's debut match held at the Osaka Prefectural Gymnasium was a match called "Karate vs. Muay Thai" and won by 2nd Round KO over "Rākurei shīhāman" (ラークレイ・シーハーマン).

In June 1966, he fought against Muay Thai fighter Samarn Sor Adisorn, who was ranked #8 at Lumpinee's featherweight division, at the Riki Palace. Sawamura lost by 4th Round KO and during the fight, was knocked down to the mat 16 times during the fight (with some reporting 19 times) and received more than 25 bruises from the fight.

Disheartened, Sawamura wanted to retrain himself in jujutsu and hold a rematch. Noguchi met with Sawamura while he was healing, and suggested that Sawamura should be trained in kickboxing proper. Sawamura begins training in Kickboxing and turns his career around, starting to rack up KO wins with moves like "vacuum jump knee kick" (真空飛び膝蹴り - Shinkū tobihizageri) and "kick before jump" (飛び前蹴り - Tobi maegeri). (Note: As dubbed by Tokyo Broadcasting Announcer Akira Ishikawa, who was broadcasting the YKK hour kick boxing broadcast at that time.)

In 1973, he awarded the Japan Professional Sports Grand Prize. At that time, it was popular on the covers of several general magazines such as "Weekly Shonen Champion" (Akita Shoten) first issue in 1969 and "Weekly Shonen Magazine" (1968 issue 47).

The final match was held on July 2, 1977, and the retirement ceremony was held on October 10, the following year. His final record was 241 fights, 232 wins (228KO), 5 losses and 4 draws.

=== Retirement and death ===
After his retirement, he broke all ties with his martial arts world and focused on managing his automobile repair company in Tokyo.

Hideki Shiraha died at a hospital in Chiba prefecture on March 26, 2021, at 78 years old. It was discovered that he had lung cancer and that it had progressed to a state where Shiraha was experiencing bloody sputum. He diagnosed in the summer of the previous year and had been medical treatment since. His funeral was held by his immediate family.

== Legacy ==
Sawamura is domestically regarded as the sport's great champions and helped increase Kickboxing's international profile, retiring with over 200 knockouts.

While credited as one of the drivers of the Shōwa era kickboxing boom, his retirement in 1977 caused immediate ripples to be felt in Japanese Kickboxing world. Notably, the Japan Kickboxing Association fell into disarray, which resulted in various groups splitting away from it. In 1984, its remnants were absorbed by the Japan Kickboxing Federation (NKB).

Sawamura had an exceptionally high knockout percentage of 94.60% in combat sports. For comparison, in heavyweight boxing the two highest knockout percentages are 87.76% by Rocky Marciano and 87.23% by Vitali Klitschko. Mike Tyson, who became famous for his knockout power, retired with a knockout percentage of 75.86%.

It is believed that a significant number of Sawamura's fights were staged. Many who knew Sawamura at the time have testified that Sawamura preferred actual combat and possessed legitimate fighting ability, and that if some fights were staged, Sawamura still had to have legit skill to fend himself if an opponent with actual skill decided to "shoot" and beat up Sawamura for sake of glory.

== In media ==
His exploits were the basis of a manga series called Kick no Oni, written by Ikki Kajiwara and published in Shōnen Gahōsha. The manga was later adapted to an anime series by Toei Animation, and was broadcast on TBS from October 2, 1970, to March 26, 1971. Besides in domestic Japan, the anime series became very popular in Brazil during the 70's and early 80's, released there as "Sawamu, o Demolidor".

Sawamura has recorded two songs during his life. "Uta ikasu machida ze" (いかす街だぜ - "It's a cool city") in 1969 and the theme song for the 1970 Kick no Oni.

In movies, he has had minor roles in 1968 movie Gorotsuki, the 1970 Tōei film "Ninkyō kōbō-shi kumichō to daigashi" and 1974 Tōei movie "Gokuaku kenpō".

In TV, he has had guest appearances in television shows, such as Return of Ultraman (Episode 27), Henshin Ninja Arashi (Episode 36), the 1974 TV Show The Bodyguard (Episode 2) and Tatakae! Doragon (Episode 21).

=== Influence and tributes ===
Japanese professional wrestler Jumbo Tsuruta used a jumping knee strike in tribute to Sawamura.

The Japanese name for the Pokémon Hitmonlee is Sawamurā (officially romanized as "Sawamular"), which is a reference to Sawamura.

In 2005, a Pachinko Machine named "CR Kick no Oni" based after him was released.

== Championships and accomplishments ==
- Japan Professional Sports Association
  - Japan Professional Sports Grand Prize recipient 1973
- Japan Kickboxing Association
  - Oriental Lightweight champion (Defended 20 times)
  - Oriental Middleweight champion (Defended 14 times)

== Kickboxing Record ==
- 241 total fights
  - 232 wins
    - 228 by knockout
  - 5 losses
  - 4 draws

== See also ==
- List of male kickboxers
