= Motoo Noguchi =

Japanese court judge

Motoo Noguchi is a Japanese judge and chairman of the Board of Directors of the Trust Fund for Victims at the International Criminal Court.

His other and former positions include:

- Prosecutor in Japan (1985-1996)
- Professor at the Research & Training Institute of the Ministry of Justice (1996-2000)
- Counsel at the Office of the General Counsel of Asian Development Bank (2000-2004)
- Professor at UNAFEI (2004-2012)
- International judge of the Supreme Court Chamber at the Extraordinary Chambers in the Courts of Cambodia (ECCC, 2006-2012)
