= Ubayd Haider =

Fijian professional boxer (1998/1999–2024)

Ubayd Haider (born Nathaniel Singh; 1998 or 1999 – November 10, 2024) was a Fijian professional boxer who competed between 2019 and 2024. The self-styled "Prince of Fiji", in 2024, he held the Fijian Super featherweight title. While contesting the International Boxing Organization (IBO) Asia Pacific Featherweight title, Haider was knocked unconscious, slipped into a coma and died two weeks later at age 25.

== Early life ==
Ubayd Haider was born Nathaniel Singh into a boxing family in Suva, Fiji. His father Gyan Singh is a boxing trainer (Joseph Kwadjo), and his brother Sebastian "the Sniper" Singh is a professional cruiserweight boxer. His father would be his first boxing trainer.

Singh began boxing at age six. He made his international boxing debut in 2016 with a win in Papua New Guinea. He would continue in the footsteps of his father and brother as boxer.

== Personal life ==
Haider was married to Helen Singh and the couple shared two sons. He was described as a humble and hard-working young man, who made his boxing club and his family proud.

== Amateur career ==
Singh went undefeated as an amateur, boxing at bantamweight. Through his amateur career, Singh posted a record of 18–0.

In 2018, he joined the Fijian training camp in preparation for the 2018 Commonwealth Games, but was unselected as one of Fiji's two boxers sent to the Games.

In April 2019, Singh won the gold medal at the Fiji National Boxing Championships for the 57 kg division. After the win, he eagerly looked forward to the Pacific Games and the opportunity to compete internationally. Singh hoped to represent his country at the Olympic Games, however when he was left off of Fiji's Pacific Games squad "without any explanation" he turned professional.

== Professional career ==
In October 2019, Singh made his professional debut at age 19 while a first year medical student at Fiji National University. He won on his pro debut against Ritesh Gounder with unanimous points.

Early in his professional career, he was known as Nathan "the Hornet" Singh.

In March 2021, Singh experienced a difficult loss while competing for the Fiji lightweight title against Ronald Naidu. He appeared emotional after the bout when a technical knockout victory was awarded to Naidu. After the fight, some attendees at the Prince Charles Park venue vented their frustration at referee Jerry Ledua, including the night's heavyweight title victor.

In December 2021, Bluegas, a Fijian petroleum supplier, was announced as a new sponsor for Singh.

In 2022, Singh would have a string of successes. In July, Singh recorded a technical knockout victory against Sachin Mudaliar in the second round. In November he made his Australian debut and recorded his fifth professional win against Robert Lale.

The next month, he returned to Australia and recorded another victory, this time by unanimous decision against Luke Martin.

=== Prince of Fiji ===
In 2023, after his victories in Australia and in anticipation of his bout with Vanuatu’s Masing Warawara, Singh started to become styled as Nathan "Prince of Fiji" Singh. That June, he was successful in his bout against Warawara.

In early January 2024, Singh made several announcements about his career and future boxing plans. After fighting in one professional bout the previous year, Singh shared he was preparing for two high stakes bouts, first against Mohammad Ali and secondly against Mikaele Ravalaca after which he planned to transition away from the sport.

=== Ubayd Haider ===
Early in 2024, Singh shared that he had converted to Islam, and changed his name. Singh, now known as Ubayad Haider, shared that since his conversion to Islam, his faith had provided a renewed sense of focus on what he wanted to achieve in life and in sport. Depending on his boxing accomplishments that year, Haider alluded to a possible October 2024 opportunity to fight on the United States boxing circuit.

Haider also reaffirmed his commitment to step away from boxing after the 2024 season. Haider described how after nearly 20 years of boxing, he wanted to give back to his community, helping young boxers and building a career as a nutritionist.

In March 2024, in his first fight as Ubayd Haider, Haider defeated Mohammed Ali at the Vodafone Arena in Suva based on unanimous points. Prior to the bout, Ali claimed Haider would be defeated and quit boxing.

Dr. Shailendra Singh of the University of the South Pacific media school described the fight, "I thought Nathan (Haider) did well. It was an easy night for him. Far too skilled for Mohammed (Ali). He needs to stop the showboating though. I reckon that he's an exciting fighter with loads of talent who trains seriously for all his fights. Against a serious opponent he will step up."

In May 2024, Haider successfully contested his first title fight, winning the Fijian super featherweight title in a bout against Krishnil Mudaliar. In August he would capture another professional win against Saimoni Ratu.

== South Pacific Boxing Promotion ==
On 26 October 2024 the Boxing Commission of Fiji and South Pacific Boxing Promotions would host one of the largest boxing events ever to be held in the Pacific region at King Charles Park in Nadi. The event would host 3 international title fights in one night. Haider would contest the IBO Asia Pacific Super Featherweight title as the Fijian champion. His brother, cruiserweight boxer Sebastian “The Sniper” Singh’ would also compete at the event that night. The brothers aimed to make history by contesting for two IBO Asia Pacific titles on the same night at the same event.

During Haider's bout against Australian-based fighter Runqi Zhou, Haider fell unconscious after being knocked out. He was admitted to Lautoka Aspen Hospital and found to have suffered a brain hemorrhage. Haider underwent emergency brain surgery, and slipped in a coma.

=== Death and aftermath ===
Haider remained in a coma until he died on 10 November 2024, 16 days after his unsuccessful title fight. He was 25.

Haider was described as one of Fiji's most promising talents, and his death left a considerable impact on the wider boxing community in the country.

Prior to Haider's death, the Fiji Boxing Commission planned an inquiry about the events, due to Haider's extensive injuries and subsequent criticism from the community. The commission was slated to begin 30 October 2024. In the following days, further questions were raised about the operations of the South Pacific Boxing Promotion, such as the availability of ambulances, insurance for boxers, and the requirement to have drug tests. It was later determined that no boxer underwent a drug test after their fight, despite a requirement to do so.

After Haider's death, his father and trainer Gyan Singh looked to hold the Boxing Commission of Fiji and the South Pacific Boxing Promotions accountable for his son's death. Singh was reportedly suing the Fijian boxing authorities and the event's promoter.

== Professional boxing record ==
12 fights	10 wins	2 losses
By knockout	6	2
Draws	0	
