= Yoshiaki Nagasawa =

Japanese bicycle frame builder (born 1947)

Yoshiaki Nagasawa (born 1947) is a Japanese bicycle frame builder who builds primarily Keirin track racing bicycles. He has a one-man shop near Osaka, Japan. Notable riders of his bikes include ten-time world champion track racing cyclist Koichi Nakano.

Nagasawa was born in 1947 in Asahi, Chiba Prefecture. In his youth he took part in bicycle races in Japan, including the Japan National Championships Road Race. Later he was chosen as a hopeful to race for Japan at the 1968 Olympics in Mexico City. But after colliding with a bus while training the year before the 1968 Games, he retired from competition. Giving up racing he decided to become a mechanic for bicycle racing. After graduating from Nihon University in 1970, he went to Italy and studied building under Ugo De Rosa of De Rosa Bicycles, and has been building bicycles in Japan since the late 1970s.

Nagasawa returned to Japan in January 1976 and established his plant, Nagasawa Racing Cycle, in Kashiwara, Osaka Prefecture. Koichi Nakano debuted in the track world championships that same year and took the fourth place. He started to ride the Nagasawa frame bike in April 1977 and won an unprecedented 10 world titles, all with Nagasawa frames.

He keeps manufacturing frames to this day and is still invited to races as a mechanic.

I feel happy when people say they enjoy riding bikes I made.

— Yoshiaki Nagasawa,
