= Noguchi Yuka =

Japanese educator

- 野口幽香
- Born: 17 March 1866; Himeji
- Died: 27 January 1950 (aged 83); Shinjuku, Tokyo
- Education: Tōkyō Shihangakkō Joshibu (present Ochanomizu University)
- Occupations: kindergarten teacher, social welfare entrepreneur
- Known for: preschool education, welfare for underprivileged, especially children and mothers

Noguchi Yuka (Yuka Noguchi (野口幽香, 野口ゆか), March 17, 1866 (1 February Keiō 2)–27 January 1950 (Shōwa 25)) was a Japanese woman educator for preschool education and a social entrepreneur.

== Before 1900s ==
Born on 1 February 1866 (Keio 2) in Himeji Shimizu (present Himeji, Hyogo prefecture), Yuka's father Noguchi Iyashi was a feudal retainer of the Harima clan, her mother Kuri a daughter of a Confucian scholar of the clan, and her younger brother Noguchi Magoichi (1869–1915) was an architect. In 1890 (Meiji 23), Noguchi Yuka graduated from Tōkyō Shihangakkō Joshibu (literary Women's College of Tokyo Normal School, present Ochanomizu University), and took up a position at the kindergarten attached to her alma matar as an assistant teacher. In 1894 (Meiji 27), she was transferred to a kindergarten newly established as attached to Kazoku jogakkō, a girls' school for daughters of the imperial and aristocrat families.

One day on her way to her office, she saw a child in poor clothes play on roadside and drew letters on ground, and she looked at an arrogant child of around the same age who ordered and ruled the surrounding attendants at the school gate. It was when she began to think about the education for children of underprivileged family. In January 1900 (Meiji 33) Noguchi and Morishima Mine established Futaba Kindergarten for children of poor family at a small rental house in Shimo Rokubancho in central Tokyo near Tokyo Imperial Palace, a middle class residential area.

== Futaba Kindergarten for the poor ==
It was in 1906 (Meiji 39) when the Kindergarten was relocated to an imperial premises for free rent, which was in Yotsuya Samegabashi, in one of the three major slums in Meiji period. Noguchi sympathized with the modern education for young children which Friedrich Fröbel advocated, and started her kindergarten on his concept that education for young children should answer to the needs and ability unique to them. On top of that, her kindergarten became the pioneer of qualified "Kindergarten for poor children" in Japan.

They renamed Futaba kindergarten to Futaba Nursery School in 1916 (Taisho 5) as they had operated for dry nursing and accommodated changes in governing laws and social system. A branch facility named Asahi Bun'en in Naito Shinjuku Minamimachi, Shinjukuku, was opened with Tokunaga Yuki as the head kindergartener.

After Tokunaga was baptized at the age of at the age of 15 in 1902, she by chance found a board in Yotsuya that Futaba Kindergarten would open on the premise which was not so far from her home. She decided to work for Noguchi. The main facility housed an elementary school division for those children who were not enrolled in compulsory elementary school for economic reasons, and that division maintained its service from 1919 to 1921 when it was turned over to the city of Tokyo. They renovated that division into a library in 1922, the year beginning an after-school day care for elementary school pupils (so-called After School Care Program). Their Boys and Girls club was initiated the same year.

== Facilities for mothers ==
As the mortal rate for newborn rose in early 1900s, Noguchi decided and added Mothers' Home for single mothers and their children, which would be the pioneer of those home for mother-and-child since 1922 (Taisho 11.) In the same year, a night clinic was opened for working parents and their children with Dr.Nagata Eisuke as resident practitioner. For the sick, Noguchi's staff, those with clinical nurse license as well as any other staff took care of around the clock. A thrift market was also opened, while a sewing class was provided in the evenings. The Yotsuya main facility was partially destroyed at the 1923 Kanto Earthquake, Asahicho branch in Shinjuku was burned down, to be reopened the following year. The Mothers' Home had been expanded with a second building in 1924, and in 1928 additional rooms and services was added to it when the Yotsuya main facility was rebuilt that year.

== Retirement ==
Noguchi appointed Tokunaga Yuki as the second principal and trusted all the management of their kindergarten when they finalized to upgrade their kindergarten to a public service corporation. She died at her home in Kamiochiai at the age of 84, survived by her nieces and nephews by her brother Magoichi. She shares her tomb with Tokunaga Yuki at Tama Cemetery. As a devoted Christian, Noguchi Yuka established the Tokyo Futaba Dokuritsu Kyokai in Higashi Nakano, Tokyo, in 1910 (Meiji 43), or the present Higashi Nakano Church, United Church of Christ in Japan.

== Publications ==
- Noguchi, Yuka (November 1906). Nihon Sangakukai (ed.). "Hatsu tozan (Iwawashi tozanki)". Sangaku. Vol. 1, no. 3. Meikeido. ISSN 0286-7508. OCLC 47181095.
- Shirō Moriue; Reihō Kashiwame, eds. (2004). "Noguchi Yuka". Hoiku yōgo jiten: Kodomo to hoiku o mitsumeru kī wādo (3 ed.). Minerva shobō. ISBN 9784623073528. OCLC 908068577.
- Murota, Yasuo (2006). Jinbutsu de yomu kindai Nihon shakai fukushi no ayumi. Minerva Shobō. ISBN 9784623045198. OCLC 70233439.
- Shishido, Takeo (August 2014). "Azuma Motoyoshi to Noguchi Yuka". Nihon ni okeru hoikuen no tanjō: kodomotachi no hinkon ni idonda hitobito. Shindokushosha. ISBN 9784788011809. OCLC 893840425.
