= Susumu Noguchi =

Japanese boxer

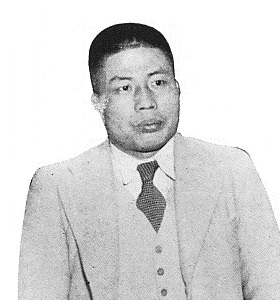

Personal information
- Nationality: Japanese
- Born: June 1, 1908 Tokyo, Japan
- Died: May 8, 1961 (aged 52)
- Weight: Welterweight

Boxing career
- Stance: Orthodox

Boxing record
- Total fights: 56
- Wins: 33
- Win by KO: 6
- Losses: 7
- Draws: 16

Susumu Noguchi (June 1, 1908 – May 1, 1961) was a Japanese professional boxer who was best known for winning the Japanese Welterweight title.

In June 1931, Susumu Noguchi tried bombing Junnosuke Inoue's residence. Susumu Noguchi served a short prison sentence.

In 1933 Noguchi was arrested for trying to assassinate the politician Wakatsuki Reijirō, an important Japanese politician when the minister departed at Ueno Station in Tokyo in protest of the London Naval Treaty.

Susumu Noguchi is the founder of Noguchi boxing gym which produced notable Japanese boxers such as Hitoshi Misako and Hiroyuki Ebihara.

== Personal life ==
Susumu Noguchi had two sons, flyweight boxer Kyō Noguchi and Osamu Noguchi, founder of the sport Kickboxing.
