= Kyō Noguchi =

Japanese boxer

Personal information
- Nationality: Japanese
- Born: June 14, 1939 Ehime Prefecture, Japan
- Died: January 1, 2009 (aged 69) Adachi, Tokyo, Japan
- Weight: Flyweight

Boxing career
- Stance: Orthodox

Boxing record
- Total fights: 52
- Wins: 37
- Win by KO: 6
- Losses: 10
- Draws: 5

Kyō Noguchi (June 14, 1939 – January 1, 2009) was a Japanese former professional boxer who was best known for winning the Japanese flyweight title and fighting for the Oriental and Pacific Boxing Federation title.

== Professional career ==
On April 28, 1961, Kyō Noguchi defeated Atsuto Fukumoto to win the Japanese flyweight championship and won the title by a decision. This made history as the first parent and son boxing champion in Japan because Susumu Noguchi was the Japanese welterweight champion. On May 30, 1962, Noguchi challenged Pone Kingpetch for the flyweight world championship, but Noguchi lost by unanimous decision.

On January 1, 2009, Kyō Noguchi died of heart failure at his home in Adachi, Tokyo.

== Personal life ==
Osamu Noguchi the founder of Kickboxing was Kyō Noguchi's brother.

== Professional boxing record ==
52 fights	37 wins	10 losses
By knockout	6	0
By decision	31	10
Draws	5	

No.	Result	Record	Opponent	Type	Round, time	Date	Location	Notes
52	Loss	31–10-5	Seisaku Saito	RTD				Japanese Flyweight title
51	Loss	31–9-5	Ray Min Chan	PTS				
50	Loss	31–8-5	Seisaku Saito	PTS				
49	Win	31–8-4	Narongrit Jalengkabo	KO				
48	Loss	30–8-4	Pone Kingpetch	UD	15	May 30, 1962	Kokugikan, Japan	Fought for NBA and The Ring flyweight titles
47								
46								
45								
44								
43								
42								
41								
40								
39								
38								
37								
36								
35								
34								
33								
32								
31								
30								
29								
28								
27								
26								
25								
24								
23								
22								
21								
20								
19								
18								
17								
16								
15								
14								
13								
12								
11								
10								
9								
8								
7								
6								
5								
4								
3	Win		Seito Nishihara		3-0	1955-08-13		
2	Win		Fujio Otake	KO	2-0	1955-08-02		
1	Win		Shinji Miwa	KO	1-0	1955-06-14		
