= Osamu Noguchi =

Kickboxing promoter

- Born: January 24, 1934; Bunkyo-ku, Tokyo, Japan
- Died: May 9, 2016 (aged 82)
- Occupation: Kickboxing promoter
- Known for: Pioneering Kickboxing in Japan
- Father: Susumu Noguchi
- Relatives: Kyō Noguchi (brother)

Osamu Noguchi (Japanese: 野口 修, Hepburn: Noguchi Osamu; 24 January 1934 – 9 May 2016) was a Japanese kickboxing promoter. He is often credited for creating the sport and the term kickboxing.

== Biography ==
Osamu Noguchi family moved to Shanghai in 1938 at the invitation of Yoshio Kodama, Noguchi spent his childhood being entertained by Japanese jazz singer Dick Mine in nightclubs run by his father Susumu Noguchi. When the Japanese were defeated in the Pacific War, the Noguchi family were repatriated back to Japan.

After Osamu Noguchi graduated Meiji University, he became the manager of Noguchi Boxing Gym which was owned by his father Susumu Noguchi, and worked as a boxing promoter. In 1961, Noguchi became the owner of Noguchi Gym after his father died, and also promoted his younger brother Kyō Noguchi's boxing matches on television with NET (Nihon Educational Television Co., Ltd, now TV Asahi). However, Noguchi was arrested for matchfixing of world title fights, and was backlisted from the boxing promotion in Japan, including being cut off from his contract with NET.

In 1964 Osamu Noguchi and Tatsuo Yamada organised a 3-on-3 competition of Kyokushin Karate vs Muay Thai competition with Tadashi Nakamura, Kenji Kurosaki and Tadashi Sawamura being the representatives for Karate and defeating their Muay Thai opponents at the Lumpinee Boxing Stadium in Thailand. This would be the basis of what would be popularly known as the sport of Kickboxing and established the Japan Kickboxing Association. Noguchi coined the term "kickboxing" in the 1960s as a Japanese anglicism for a hybrid martial art combining Muay Thai and karate, which he had introduced in 1958.

In 1970 under the guidance of Yoko Yamaguchi persuaded Noguchi to sign Hiroshi Itsuki as a singer with great success.

In October 1972, Noguchi opened a Kickboxing gym on Ratchadamri Road which sparked a backlash in Thailand. In 1976 Noguchi, founded the World Kickboxing Association.

On 9 May 2016, Noguchi died.

== Popular culture ==
Osamu Noguchi appears as character in Kick no Oni a Japanese anime based on the life of the kickboxer Tadashi Sawamura.
