= Gambling in Japan =

Sports betting, lotteries and casinos in Japan

In Japan, most forms of gambling are generally banned by the Criminal Code chapter 23. However, there are several exceptions, including betting on horse racing and certain motor sports.

Public sports, lottery, and toto (football pools) are held under special laws in order to increase the income of national and local governments as well as to offer a form of entertainment.

Since 2018, casino operators have been bidding for three legal licenses to operate an integrated casino resort in Japan, including in Osaka, Tokyo, and Yokohama. The Japanese government established the Casino Administration Committee in 2020 to supervise and manage Japan's resort operators.

== Public sports ==
Kōei kyōgi (Japanese: 公営競技, public sports) or Kōei Gyanburu (Japanese: 公営ギャンブル, public gambling) are public races that can be gambled on legally. There are four types: horse racing, bicycle racing, powerboat racing, and asphalt speedway motorcycle racing. They are allowed by special laws and are regulated by local governments or governmental corporations.

All four types employ parimutuel betting. The prize pool for gamblers on these races are 70–80% of total sales. Betting tickets are available at numerous circuits and ticket booths (off-track betting) within many cities.

== Lottery ==
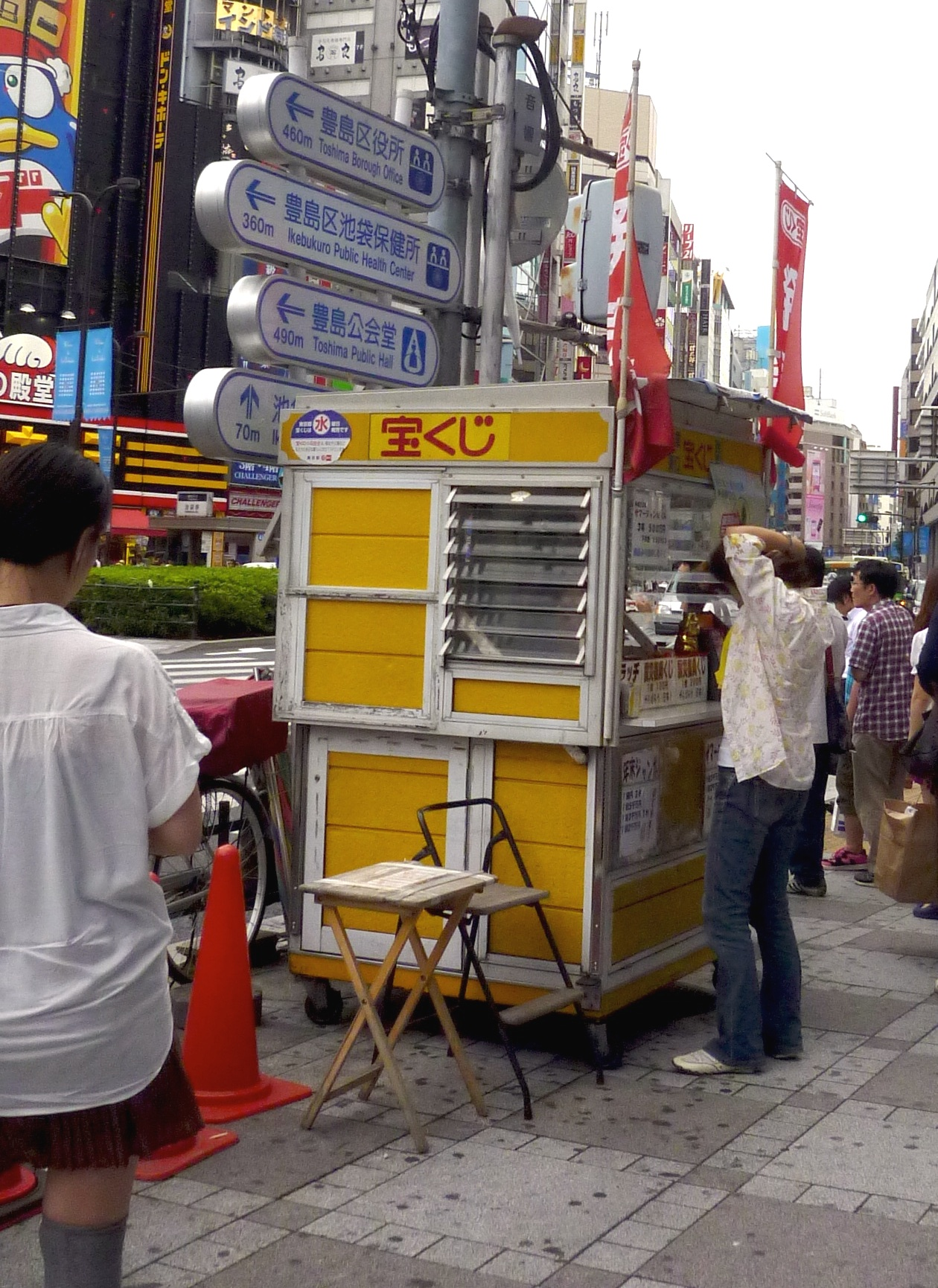
Small street shop, in Ikebukuro, selling takarakuji tickets

Takarakuji (宝くじ), i.e., lotteries, are held by prefectures or large cities on a regular basis all throughout the calendar year.

There are three main types of lotteries: unique number lotteries, selected number lotteries, and scratch cards. Each lottery ticket is sold at 100 to 500 yen, and the top cash prizes are usually 100 million yen or more.

The takarakuji law stipulates that the entire prize pool for any given lottery is to be less than 50% of total sales, with the rest going to local government organizations and charities.

Takarakuji tickets are available at takarakuji booth and stores in many cities, with some outlets becoming particularly popular. Tickets for selected number lotteries can be also bought at some ATMs.

== Pachinko ==
Pachinko (Japanese: パチンコ), is a pinball-like slot machine game. It is officially not considered gambling because Japanese laws regard pachinko as an exception to the criminal code on gambling for historical, monetary, and cultural reasons. Pachinko parlors can be found all over Japan, and they are operated by private companies. As of 2011, there are about 12,480 pachinko parlors in Japan. In 2018, Japan spent $200 billion on pachinko each year. Also, "nearly half of all leisure time in Japan" was spent in pachinko parlors.

In pachinko, when a player's ball makes it into a special hole to activate the slot machine and a jackpot is made, they are rewarded with more balls. Players can then exchange the balls for prizes of different value at a booth in the parlor. Money cannot be awarded at pachinko parlors as this would be in violation of the criminal code. However, players almost always exchange pachinko balls for special tokens, usually slips of gold encased in plastic, and then "sell" them at a neighboring shop for cash. This neighbouring shop is often owned by the parlor, but as long as the winners do not receive cash in the parlor premises itself, the law is not broken.

On April 4, 2011, Shintaro Ishihara, the Governor of Tokyo at the time, spoke against the pachinko parlors, arguing that the popular game together with vending machines were wasting electricity, at "nearly 10 million kilowatts of energy [sic]". He said that following the consequences the earthquake of March 11, 2011, the government asked people to reduce energy consumption, but asking was not enough and the government order was not enacted. In 2016, the Parliament voted to approve the said law that will eventually "alter the gambling industry in Japan"

== Sports lottery ==
Sports Promotion Lottery (スポーツ振興くじ, Supōtsu Shinkō-kuji) is a sports lottery run by the Japan Sports Council, a special corporation under the jurisdiction of the Ministry of Education, Culture, Sports, Science and Technology. It was established in the spring of 2000 under the Sports Betting Law and was launched in 2001. It was initially aimed at J-League with Soccer-kuji (サッカーくじ) or Toto. Soccer-kuji was divided into two types: Toto, where the participants predict the result of the game, and TotoGOAL, where the participants predict the goals scored. In the fall of 2022, a prediction-based lottery was established aimed at B.League.

== Illegal gambling ==
The origins of the yakuza are known to have been shaped in part by rings of bakuto, itinerant gamblers who rose in power amid an uptick in illegal gambling following the Tokugawa shogunate's establishment of permanent peace in the country. To this day, Yakuza are known to operate illegal casinos in Japan. In addition to traditional casino games, mahjong can be played for money, and many mahjong parlours have ties with the Yakuza to assist in collecting debt from players who default.

Another illegal gambling opportunity is offered by mobile gambling sites. At these sites, Japanese gamblers can play rock paper scissors (roshambo) and win cash prizes. In 2010, the owner of one of these sites was arrested and confessed to earning over $1 million. The players purchased betting tickets for ¥315. They could win ¥1000 if they won three times in a row, while ¥10,000 was the prize for those who won five times in a row.

In 2025, Japan is set to introduce a new law aimed at curbing illegal online gambling, following reports that illicit bets have exceeded ¥1 trillion and that over 3 million people, including many young adults, are involved in online gambling. The proposed legislation will prohibit the operation and advertisement of online casinos, including on social media, and mandate public awareness campaigns by both central and local governments to highlight the illegality and consequences of such activities. The law, expected to be submitted during the current Diet session and enacted swiftly if approved, also seeks to address the country’s growing gambling addiction problem, particularly among youth, with the hope of reducing both illegal gambling and its associated social harms.

== Casinos ==
=== Efforts to legalize ===
There were movements within the Liberal Democratic Party (LDP) government to open casinos to boost tourism in Japan. Operating casinos remains illegal in Japan, and recent sports betting on baseball by sumo wrestlers has caused a scandal.

In 2000, former mayor Ishihara proposed building casinos in Odaiba, but despite the high public interest, the idea was not entirely approved. One of the arguments against the developments was that the Japanese being not used to gambling would be too prone to addiction. Another possibility for the development of the casino industry in Japan is the creation of floating casinos. The idea of boat gambling has also been actively supported by Ishihara.

Casino legislation in Japan picked up fresh momentum with lawmakers submitting the Integrated Resort (IR) Enabling Act to the Diet in 2015.

=== Legalization and bidding ===
In July 2018, Japanese lawmakers approved a bill that officially allows casinos in the country. Three casinos in the form of integrated resorts (IRs) will be established in different locations. The IRs will come with restrictions and Japanese locals will only be able to visit the casinos three times per week, or ten times a month. Japanese visitors will also be charged a 6,000 yen entrance fee to help discourage addiction.

Osaka was the first to launch the "Request For Proposal" (RFP) process in 2019, and the five companies who applied for an Osaka integrated casino resort license are Las Vegas Sands, Wynn Resorts, MGM Resorts, Melco Resorts, and Genting Singapore. Names of two gambling operators were not revealed as they had requested anonymity. In February 2020 only MGM Resorts had submitted a bid in Osaka, with no bids put in by competing companies Galaxy Entertainment and Genting Singapore. MGM was awarded the contract. Las Vegas Sands, Melco Resorts and Entertainment and Wynn Resorts all said they were instead focusing on Yokohama and Tokyo and the bidding processes there, for the remaining two licenses.

On May 13, 2020, Las Vegas Sands recalled its bid to open an IR in Japan amid postponement of the Tokyo 2020 Olympics and global coronavirus epidemic.

MGM Resorts began construction of MGM Osaka, an integrated resort in Osaka in April 2025. MGM Osaka will include 2,300 hotel rooms, a casino, shopping and dining options, convention space and a 3,500 seat theatre.

=== Casino Administration Committee ===
The Japanese government established the Casino Administration Committee on January 7, 2020. Intended to supervise and manage Japan's IR operators, it operates as an external department to the cabinet. The chairman is Michio Katamura. It will grant casino licenses and also be able to revoke them, and investigate operators and related officers.

== Media depictions ==
Gambling is a central theme in many Japanese works of fiction, including manga, anime, film, and literature. Examples of notable franchises centered on gambling in Japanese culture include Kakegurui, Kaiji, Usogui, Akagi, The Legend of the Gambler: Tetsuya, Liar Game, Mahjong Hishō-den: Naki no Ryū, One Outs, Rio: Rainbow Gate!, and Gambling Emperor Legend Zero.

== See also ==
- Bookmaker
- problem gambling
- addiction
- organised crime
