= Hour record =

Record for the longest distance cycled in one hour on a bicycle

The hour record is the record for the longest distance cycled in one hour on a bicycle from a stationary start. Cyclists attempt this record alone on the track without other competitors present. It is considered one of the most prestigious records in cycling. Since it was first set, cyclists ranging from relatively unknown amateurs to well-known professionals have held the record. There is now one unified record for upright bicycles meeting the requirements of the Union Cycliste Internationale (UCI). Hour-record attempts for UCI bikes are made in a velodrome.

== Early hour records (until 1972) ==
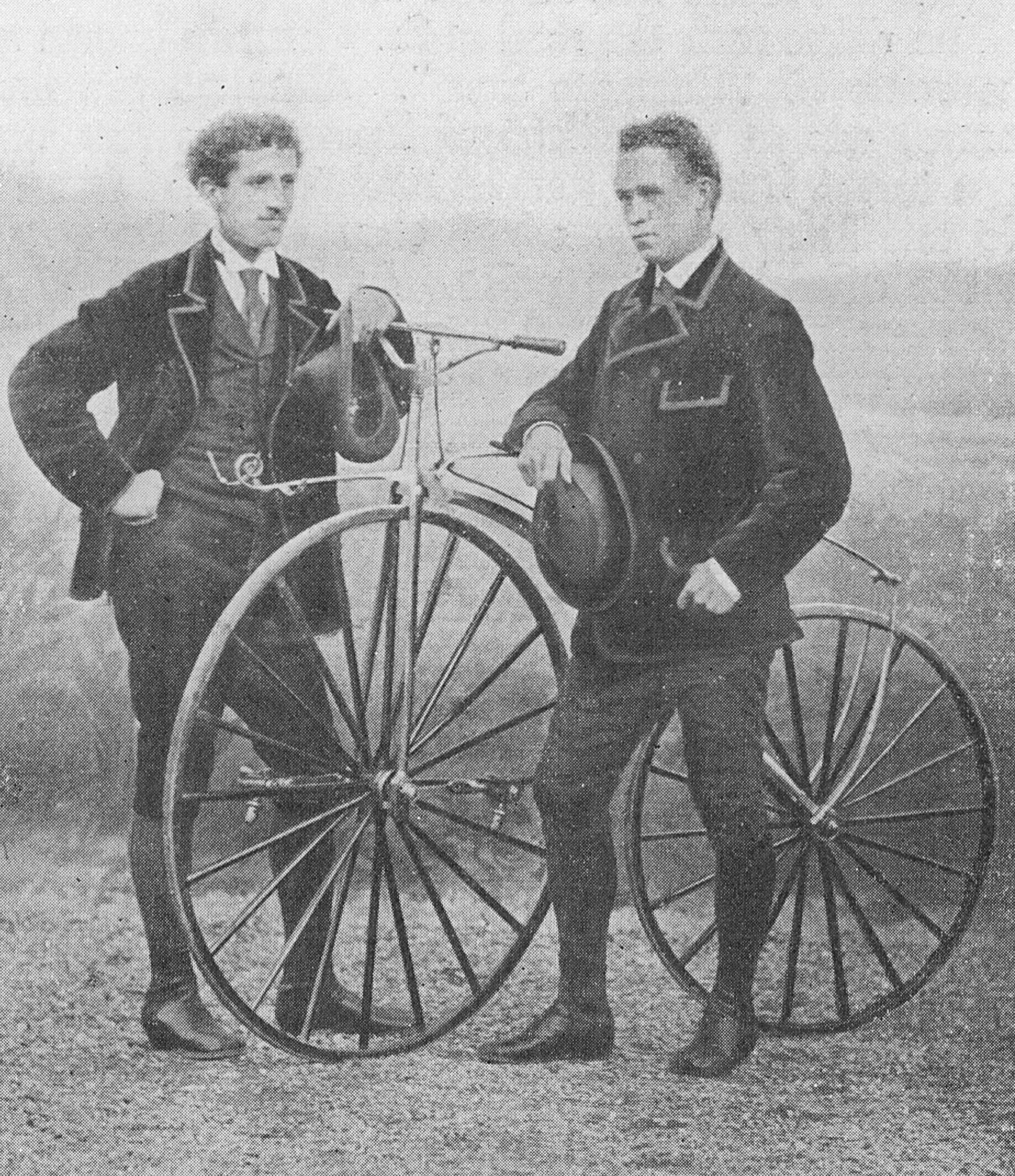
Jean-Eugène-André Castéra (left) and James Moore (right) with a Paris – Rouen velocipede, 1869

The first universally accepted record was in 1876 when the American Frank Dodds rode 26.508 km (16.471 mi) on a penny-farthing. The first recorded distance was set in 1873 by James Moore in Wolverhampton, riding a 49" high wheel (1.2 m) bicycle (possibly this one); however, the distance was recorded at exactly 14.5 miles (23.3 km), leading to the theory that the distance was just approximated and not accurately measured.

The first officially recognised record was set by Henri Desgrange at the Buffalo Velodrome, Paris, in 1893 following the formation of the International Cycling Association, the forerunner of the modern-day UCI. Throughout the run up to the First World War, the record was broken on five occasions by Swiss rider Oscar Egg and Frenchman Marcel Berthet, and due to the attempts being highly popular and guaranteeing rich attendances, it is said that each ensured he did not beat the record by too much of a margin, enabling further lucrative attempts by the other. (Note: Hutchinson, Michael (2007). The Hour. Penguin Random House. ISBN 9780224075206. (Michael Hutchinson. pp. 119–120) It is reported that as professionals, Egg and Berthet ensured not to beat the record by too great a distance, enabling them both to continue to repeatedly break the record and receive lucrative appearance fees)

The hour was attempted sporadically over the following 70 years, with most early attempts taking place at the Buffalo Velodrome in Paris, before the Velodromo Vigorelli in Milan became popular in 1930s and 1940s sparking attempts from leading Italian riders and former Giro d'Italia winners such as Fausto Coppi and Ercole Baldini. Coppi's record set in 1942, during the Second World War, despite Milan being bombed nightly by Allied forces, was eventually broken in 1956 by Jacques Anquetil on his third attempt. In 1967, 11 years later, Anquetil again broke the hour record, with 47.493 km (29.511 mi), but the record was disallowed because he refused to take the newly introduced post-race doping test. He had objected to what he saw as the indignity of having to urinate in a tent in front of a crowded velodrome and said he would take the test later at his hotel. The international judge ruled against the idea, and a scuffle ensued that involved Anquetil's manager, Raphaël Géminiani. In 1968, Ole Ritter broke the record in Mexico City, the first attempt at altitude since Willie Hamilton in 1898.

The women's hour record was first established in 1893 by Mlle de Saint-Sauveur at the Vélodrome Buffalo in Paris, setting a total distance of 26.012 km (16.163 mi). The record was improved several times over the next years, until Louise Roger reached 34.684 km (21.552 mi) in 1897 also at Vélodrome Buffalo. In 1911 the longest standing men's or women's record (37 years) was set by the 157 cm (5 ft 2 in) tall Alfonsina Strada: 37.192 km (23.110 mi) riding a 20 kg (44 lbs) machine. From 1947 to 1952, Élyane Bonneau and Jeannine Lemaire set several new hour records, the last of which was 39.735 km (24.690 mi) by Lemaire in 1952. The first women's hour record approved by the UCI was by Tamara Novikova in 1955. However Lemaire's 1952 non-UCI record was not bettered until Elsy Jacobs broke the 40 kmh barrier in 1958, the year Jacobs had won the inaugural women's road world championship. Jacobs's 1958 41.347 km UCI record would not be bettered until 1972.

=== Historical hour records ===
Men's historical hour records (1873–1972) (UCI official records from 1893)
Date	Rider	Location	Distance (km)	Increase (m)
1873	James Moore (England)	Molyneaux Grounds, Wolverhampton, England	23.331	-
25 March 1876	Frank Dodds (United States)	Cambridge University Ground (Note: Heijmans, Jeroen; Mallon, Bill (2011-10-16). The Historical Dictionary of Cycling. Scarecrow Press. ISBN 9780810871755. (Jeroen Heijmans, Bill Mallon) lists three further records after Dodds but before Herbert Cortis. Listed only by surname, 1877, Shopee in Cambridge, 26.960, 1878, Weir, in Oxford, 28.542 and Christie, in 1879, 30.374, also in Oxford.)	26.508	3,177
2 August 1882	Herbert Liddell Cortis (England)	England	32.454	5,946
1887	Jules Dubois (France)	London, England	34.217	1,763
11 May 1893	Henri Desgrange (France)	Buffalo, Paris	35.325	1,108
31 October 1894	Jules Dubois (France)	Buffalo, Paris	38.220	2,895
30 July 1897	Oscar Van den Eynde (Belgium)	Vincennes, Paris	39.240	1,020
3 July 1898	Willie Hamilton (Republic of Ireland)	Colorado Springs, USA	40.781	1,541
24 August 1905	Lucien Petit-Breton (France)	Buffalo, Paris	41.110	329
20 June 1907	Marcel Berthet (France)	Paris	41.520	410
22 August 1912	Oscar Egg (Switzerland)	Paris	42.122 (Revised to 42.360)	602
22 July 1913	Richard Weise (Germany)	Berlin, Germany	~~42.276~~	(Note: "Berthet/Egg Hour Record". Oscar Egg's original distance was recorded at 42.122 km. In July 1913 Richard Weise beat this mark, but following protest from Egg the Buffalo track was re-measured and his result changed to 42.360 km, cancelling out Weise's record)
7 August 1913	Marcel Berthet (France)	Paris	42.741	619
21 August 1913	Oscar Egg (Switzerland)	Paris	43.525	784
20 September 1913	Marcel Berthet (France)	Paris	43.775	250
18 June 1914	Oscar Egg (Switzerland)	Paris	44.247	471
7 July 1933	Francis Faure (France)	Paris	45.055	808 (Note: "The history of the recumbent bicycle". On 7 July 1933 Francis Faure rode 45.055 km on a "Velocar" beating Egg's record. This led to the UCI imposing rules regarding bicycle dimensions on 1 April 1934 and Faure's record was moved into a new category, "Records Set By Human Powered Vehicles (HPV's) without Special Aerodynamic Features")
25 August 1933	Jan van Hout (Netherlands)	Roermond	44.588	388
28 September 1933	Maurice Richard (France)	Sint-Truiden, Belgium	44.777	189
31 October 1935	Giuseppe Olmo (Italy)	Velodromo Vigorelli, Milan	45.090	313
14 October 1936	Maurice Richard (France)	Vigorelli, Milan	45.325	235
29 September 1937	Frans Slaats (Netherlands)	Vigorelli, Milan	45.485	160
3 November 1937	Maurice Archambaud (France)	Vigorelli, Milan	45.767	282
7 November 1942	Fausto Coppi (Italy)	Vigorelli, Milan	45.798	31
29 June 1956	Jacques Anquetil (France)	Vigorelli, Milan	46.159	369
19 September 1956	Ercole Baldini (Italy)	Vigorelli, Milan	46.394	235
18 September 1957	Roger Rivière (France)	Vigorelli, Milan	46.923	529
23 September 1959	Roger Rivière (France)	Vigorelli, Milan	47.347	424
27 September 1967	Jacques Anquetil (France)	Vigorelli, Milan	~~47.493~~	(Note: Howard, Paul (2008). Sex Lies and Handlebar tape, p237-239. Mainstream Publishing Company, Limited. ISBN 9781845963019. (Paul Howard) Anquetil set a record time in 1967 of 47.493 km but the record was never ratified by the UCI following Anquetil's refusal to take a post race doping control, and on 13 October the UCI voted not to allow the record.)
30 October 1967	Ferdi Bracke (Belgium)	Olympic Velodrome, Rome	48.093	746
10 October 1968	Ole Ritter (Denmark)	Mexico City	48.653	560
25 October 1972	Eddy Merckx (Belgium)	Mexico City	49.431	778

Women's historical hour records (1893–1972) (UCI official records from 1955)
Date	Rider	Location	Distance (km)	Increase (m)
July 1893	Mlle de Saint-Saveur (France)	Vélodrome Buffalo, Paris, France	26.012	-
August 1893	Renée Debatz (France)	Vélodrome Buffalo, Paris, France	28.019	2007
October 1893	Hélène Dutrieu (Belgium)	Vélodrome Lillois, Lille, France	28.78	761
October 1897	Louise Roger (France)	Vélodrome Buffalo, Paris, France	34.684	5,904
1911	Alfonsina Strada (Italy)	Moncalieri, Turin, Italy	37.192	2,508
October 1947	Elyane Bonneau (France)	France	37.56	368
November 1948	Jeannine Lemaire (France)	France	37.72	160
July 1949	Jeannine Lemaire (France)	France	38.283	563
1952	Jeannine Lemaire (France)	France	39.735	1,452
7 July 1955	Tamara Novikova (Soviet Union)	Irkoutsk, Russia	38.473	-1,262 (due to previous non-UCI records)
18 September 1957	Renee Vissac (France)	Velodromo Vigorelli, Milan, Italy	38.569	96 (still less than non-UCI record)
25 September 1958	Millie Robinson (Isle of Man)	Vigorelli Velodrome, Milan, Italy	39.719	1,150 (still less than non-UCI record)
9 November 1958	Elsy Jacobs (Luxembourg)	Vigorelli Velodrome, Milan, Italy	41.347	1,628 (1,612 increase on the non-UCI 1952 record)

== UCI hour record (1972–2014) ==
=== 1972–1984: Merckx, Moser and new technology ===
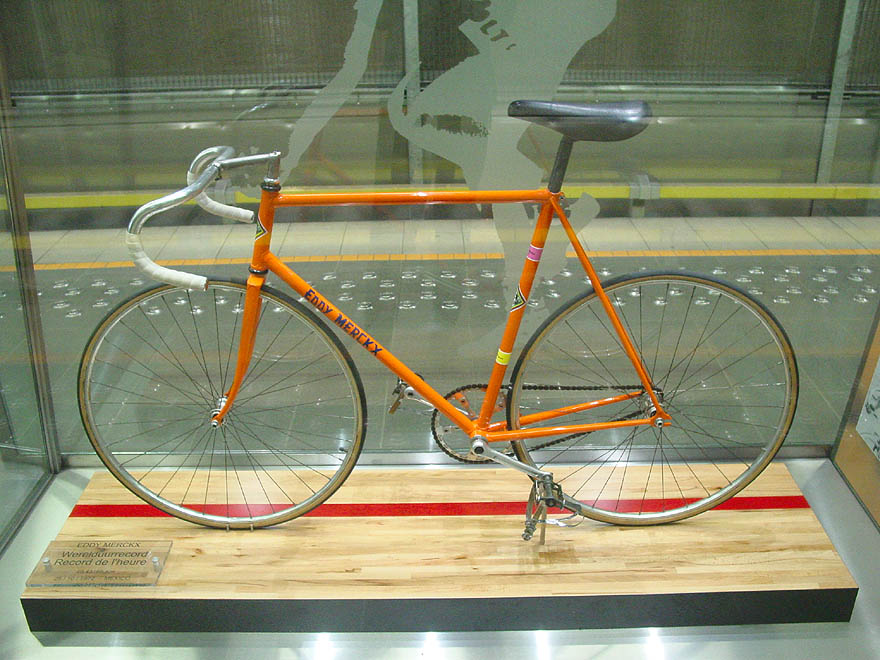
Eddy Merckx's 1972 hour record steel-framed bike

In 1972, Eddy Merckx set a new hour record at 49.431 km (30.715 mi) in Mexico City at an altitude of 2,300 m (7,500 ft) where he proclaimed it to have been "the hardest ride I have ever done".

The record stood until January 1984, when Francesco Moser set a new record at 51.151 km (31.784 mi). This was the first noted use of disc wheels, which, along with Moser's skin suit, provided aerodynamic gains. Moser's record would eventually be moved in 1997 to "best human effort".

=== 1990s: non-traditional riding positions ===
In 1993 and 1994, Graeme Obree, who built his own bikes, posted two records with his hands tucked under his chest. In 1994, Moser set the veteran's record in Mexico City, riding 51.840 km (32.212 mi) with bullhorn handlebars, steel airfoil tubing, disk wheels and skinsuit. Moser's distance beat his 1984 record and Obree's 1993 ride.

In May 1994, the UCI outlawed the "praying mantis" style. Spaniard Miguel Induráin and Swiss Tony Rominger subsequently broke the record with a more traditional tri-bar setup; Rominger rode 55.291 km.

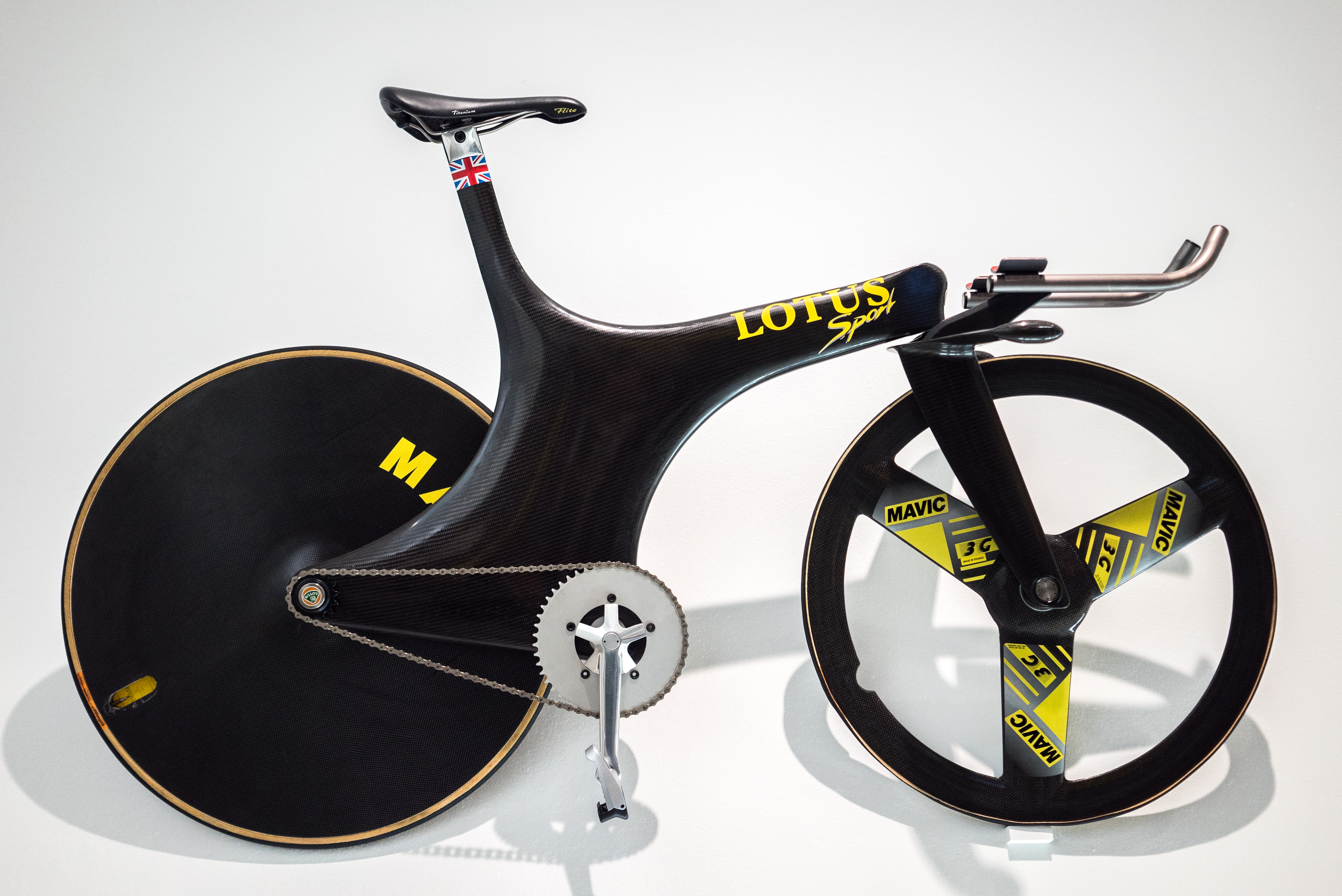
The Lotus 108 bicycle, a forerunner to the Lotus 110 Chris Boardman used to set a new hour record of 56.375 km (35.030 mi) in 1996.

Chris Boardman took up the challenge using a modified version of the Lotus 110 bicycle, a successor to the earlier Lotus 108 bicycle he'd ridden to victory at the 1992 Olympic Games. South African company Aerodyne Technology built the frame. Boardman set the UCI Absolute record of 56.375 km (35.030 mi) in 1996, using another position pioneered by Obree, his arms out in front in a "Superman" position. This too was considered controversial by the UCI, and while the record was allowed to stand, the position was banned. This enabled Boardman's 1996 record to stand for about 26 years. In October 2022, Filippo Ganna unified the records, beating Boardman's best human effort record and Daniel Bigham's official UCI Hour record on a traditionally shaped, though uniquely manufactured, bicycle.

=== 1997 UCI rule change ===
With the increasing gap between modern bicycles and what was available at the time of Merckx's record, the UCI established two records in 1997:

- UCI Hour Record: which restricted competitors to roughly the same equipment as Merckx, banning time trial helmets, disc or tri-spoke wheels, aerodynamic bars, and monocoque frames.
- Best Human Effort: also known as the UCI "Absolute" Record in which modern equipment was permitted.

As a result of the 1997 rule change, all records since 1972, including Boardman's 56.375 km (35.030 mi) in 1996, were moved to Best Human Effort and the distance of Eddy Merckx set in 1972 once more became the official UCI benchmark. In 2000, Boardman attempted the UCI record on a traditional bike, and rode 49.441 km (30.721 mi), topping Merckx by 10 metres (32.8 ft), an improvement of 0.02%.

In 2005, Ondřej Sosenka improved Boardman's performance at 49.700 km (30.882 mi) using a 54×13 gear. However, Sosenka failed a doping control in 2001 and then again in 2008, the latter resulting in a career-ending suspension which puts in doubt the validity of his record. All women's records from 1986 to 1996 were recategorized to Best Human Effort.

=== Hour record holders (men's) ===
UCI hour record (1972–2014)
Date	Rider	Age	Velodrome	Distance (km)	Equipment
25 October 1972	(Belgium) Eddy Merckx	27	Agustín Melgar (333 meters outdoor concrete high-altitude), Mexico City, Mexico	49.431	Drop handlebar, round steel tubing frame, wire spokes. 5.5 kg Colnago (drilled chain & handlebars)
27 October 2000	(United Kingdom) Chris Boardman	32	Manchester Velodrome (250 meters indoor wood sea-level), Manchester, UK	49.441	Drop handlebar, carbon fibre tubing frame, wire spokes.
19 July 2005	(Czech Republic) Ondřej Sosenka	29	Krylatskoye (333 meters indoor wood sea-level), Moscow, Russia	49.700	Drop handlebar, carbon fibre tubing frame, wire spokes.

UCI best human effort (1984–2014)
Date	Rider	Age	Velodrome	Distance (km)	Equipment
19 January 1984	(Italy) Francesco Moser	32	Agustín Melgar (333 meters outdoor concrete high-altitude), Mexico City, Mexico	50.808	Bullhorn handlebar, oval steel tubing frame, disc wheels.
23 January 1984	(Italy) Francesco Moser	32	Agustín Melgar (333 meters outdoor concrete high-altitude), Mexico City, Mexico	51.151	Bullhorn handlebar, oval steel tubing frame, disc wheels.
17 July 1993	(United Kingdom) Graeme Obree	27	Vikingskipet (250 meters indoor wood sea-level), Hamar, Norway	51.596	Graeme Obree-style "praying mantis" handlebar, round steel tubing frame, carbon tri-spoke wheels.
23 July 1993	(United Kingdom) Chris Boardman	24	Velodrome du Lac (250 meters indoor wood sea-level), Bordeaux, France	52.270	Triathlon handlebar, carbon airfoil tubing frame, carbon 4-spoke wheels.
27 April 1994	(United Kingdom) Graeme Obree	28	Velodrome du Lac (250 meters indoor wood sea-level), Bordeaux, France	52.713	Graeme Obree-style "praying mantis" handlebar, round steel tubing frame, Specialized carbon tri-spoke wheels.
2 September 1994	(Spain) Miguel Induráin	30	Velodrome du Lac (250 meters indoor wood sea-level), Bordeaux, France	53.040	Wide triathlon handlebar, carbon monocoque Pinarello Espada aero frame, disc wheels.
22 October 1994	(Switzerland) Tony Rominger	33	Velodrome du Lac (250 meters indoor wood sea-level), Bordeaux, France	53.832	Triathlon handlebar, Colnago frame with Columbus Oval CX steel tubing, disc wheels.
5 November 1994	(Switzerland) Tony Rominger	33	Velodrome du Lac (250 meters indoor wood sea-level), Bordeaux, France	55.291	Triathlon handlebar, oval steel tubing frame, disc wheels.
6 September 1996	(United Kingdom) Chris Boardman	28	Manchester Velodrome (250 meters indoor wood sea-level), Manchester, UK	56.375	Graeme Obree "superman-style" handlebar, carbon monocoque aero frame, 5-spoke front and rear disc wheel.

=== Hour record holders (women's) ===
UCI hour record (1972–2014)
Date	Rider	Age	Velodrome	Distance (km)	Equipment
25 November 1972	(Italy) Maria Cressari	28	Agustín Melgar Olympic Velodrome, Mexico City, Mexico	41.471	4.7-kilogram Colnago, drop handlebars, wire spokes.
16 September 1978	(Netherlands) Keetie van Oosten	29	Munich, Germany	43.082	RIH superlight steel frame, drop handlebars, wire spokes.
18 October 2000	(Australia) Anna Wilson-Millward	26	Vodafone Arena, Melbourne, Australia	43.501	Perkins, Columbus steel tubing, box section rims, wire spokes
5 November 2000	(France) Jeannie Longo-Ciprelli	42	Agustín Melgar Olympic Velodrome, Mexico City, Mexico	44.767	Drop handlebar, steel tubing frame, wire spokes.
7 December 2000	(France) Jeannie Longo-Ciprelli	42	Agustín Melgar, Mexico City, Mexico	45.094	Drop handlebar, steel tubing frame, wire spokes.
1 October 2003	(Netherlands) Leontien Zijlaard-van Moorsel	33	Agustín Melgar, Mexico City, Mexico	46.065	Drop handlebar, Koga chromoly tubing frame, box section rims, wire spokes

UCI best human effort (1986–2014)
Date	Rider	Age	Velodrome	Distance (km)	Equipment
20 September 1986	(France) Jeannie Longo-Ciprelli	27	OTC Velodrome, Colorado, United States of America	44.770	
23 September 1987	(France) Jeannie Longo-Ciprelli	28	OTC Velodrome, Colorado, United States of America	44.933	
1 October 1989	(France) Jeannie Longo-Ciprelli	30	Agustín Melgar Olympic Velodrome, Mexico City, Mexico	46.352	
29 April 1995	(France) Catherine Marsal	24	Bordeaux, France	47.112	Corima carbon composite bicycle. Corima 12 spoke/Corima disc wheels. Tri-Bar.
17 June 1995	(United Kingdom) Yvonne McGregor	34	Manchester Velodrome Manchester, England	47.411	Terry Dolan bicycle. Cinelli tri-bar, Corima disc wheels
26 October 1996	(France) Jeannie Longo-Ciprelli	38	Agustín Melgar Olympic Velodrome, Mexico City, Mexico	48.159	

== UCI unified hour record (2014–present) ==
=== Unified rule change (2014) ===
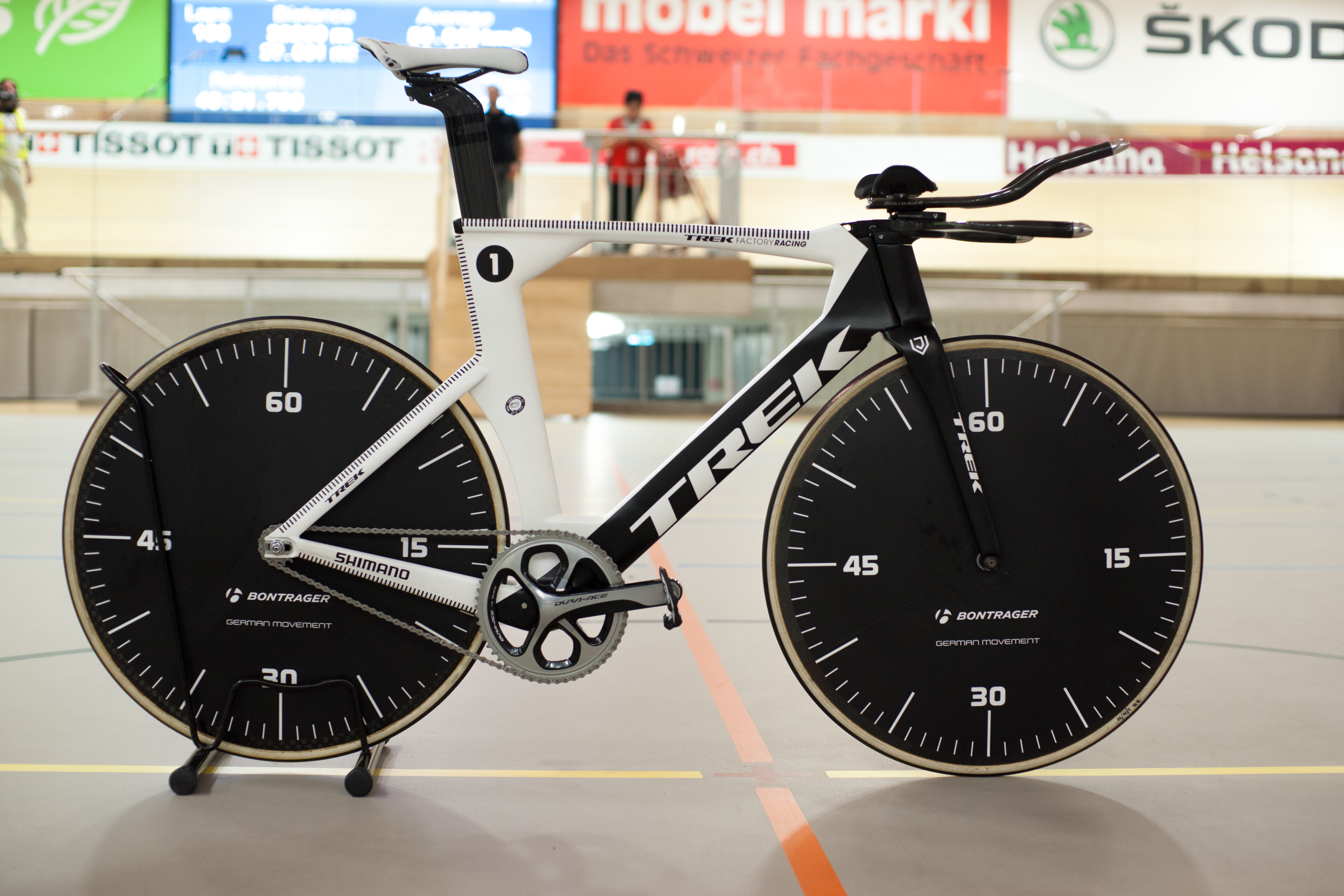
The bike used by Jens Voigt in the first attempt under the unified regulations in 2014

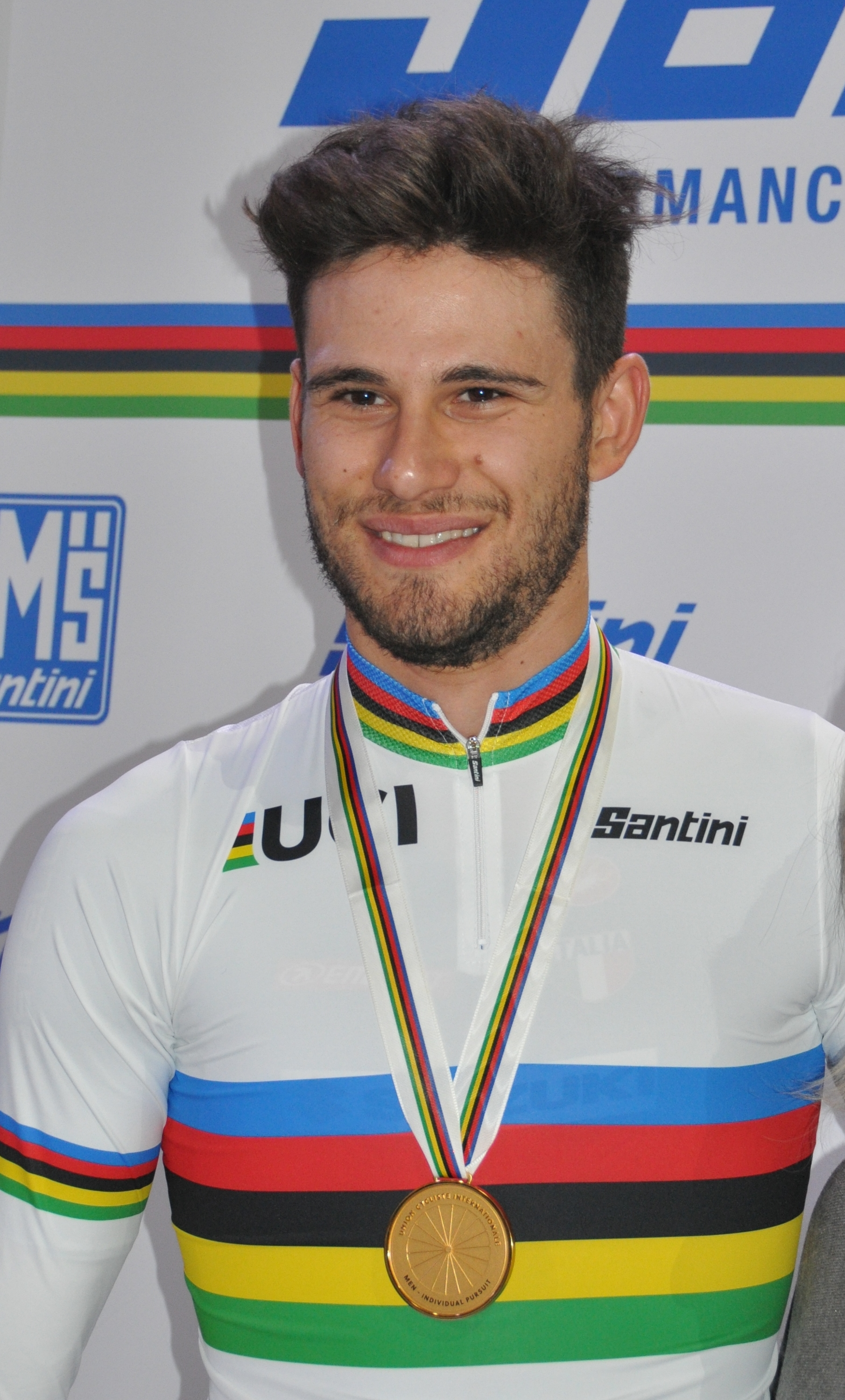
Current hour record holder Filippo Ganna, pictured here at the 2020 UCI Track Cycling World Championships

In 2014, the UCI unified the two classifications into a single classification in line with regulations for current track pursuit bikes. Records previously removed for Chris Boardman and Graeme Obree were returned, however the benchmark record would remain at 49.7 km (30.9 mi) set in 2005 by Ondrej Sosenka, even though that was not the farthest distance. Under the new regulations riders may use any bike allowed by the UCI standards for endurance track events in place at the time of the attempt.

Riders are required to be part of the athlete biological passport program. However, of the men to attempt the record since the rule change, only five were on a UCI World Tour team at the time: Jens Voigt of Trek Factory Racing, Rohan Dennis of the BMC Racing Team, Alex Dowsett of the Movistar Team, Victor Campenaerts of Lotto Soudal, Filippo Ganna of Ineos Grenadiers. Matthias Brändle was with IAM Cycling, then a UCI Professional Continental team. Jack Bobridge was on Team Budget Forklifts, an Australian UCI Continental team. Thomas Dekker had been released from World Tour team Garmin–Sharp several months before. Gustav Larsson was riding for the Professional Continental team Cult Energy Pro Cycling, whilst Bradley Wiggins had left the World Tour's Team Sky shortly before his attempt, which was made in the colours of his own UCI Continental team WIGGINS.

As of October 2022, 26 attempts have been made for the men's record, eight successfully, while nine attempts have been made on the women's record, six of them successfully.

=== Unified hour record attempts (men's) ===
Following the change in the rules, German Jens Voigt became the first rider to attempt the hour, on 18 September 2014 at the Velodrome Suisse, Grenchen, Switzerland. He set a new record of 51.110 km (31.758 mi), beating the previous record set by Sosenka by 1.41 km (0.88 mi). On 30 October 2014, Matthias Brändle set a new record of 51.852 km (32.219 mi) at the World Cycling Center in Aigle, Switzerland.

Further attempts by Australians Jack Bobridge and Rohan Dennis, and the Dutchman Thomas Dekker came within a few weeks, between 31 January and 25 February 2015. Dennis was the only one of the three to set a new record, and in doing so was the first rider to cover more than 52 kilometres (32.3 mi). Dekker's attempt at the Aguascalientes Bicentenary Velodrome was the first attempt to take place at appreciable altitude. Aguascalientes is at 1,890 m (6,200 ft) above sea level, while Melbourne is at only 31 m (102 ft), and, although in Switzerland, Grenchen and Aigle are at 451 m (1,480 ft) and 415 m (1,362 ft) respectively, and not in the mountains. High altitude is thought to result in faster times, providing the rider takes the time to acclimatise to the conditions. This is because the air density decreases with an increase in altitude, which reduces the aerodynamic drag.

Having postponed an earlier scheduled attempt due to a broken collarbone incurred in a crash while training, British cyclist Alex Dowsett exceeded Dennis's mark, with a new record of 52.937 km (32.894 mi), at Manchester Velodrome on 2 May 2015.

On 7 June 2015, Sir Bradley Wiggins broke Dowsett's record, by completing a distance of 54.526 km (33.881 mi) at the Lee Valley VeloPark in London.

On 16 April 2019, Victor Campenaerts was the first to exceed 55 km/h by completing a distance of 55.089 km (34.231 mi) at the Velodromo Bicentenario in Aguascalientes.

The UCI rules require an athlete to participate in its anti-doping system, including having a biological passport. When Daniel Bigham rode 54.723 km (34.003 mi) to break Wiggins's British national record on 1 October 2021 he was ineligible to attempt the UCI record as he was not part of the anti-doping system, estimating it would cost him £8,000.

==== Men's UCI hour record attempts and record holders (since the rule revision in 2014) ====
Men's UCI hour record attempts and record holders (since the rule revision in 2014)
Date	Rider	Age	Velodrome	Distance (km)	Supported by	Equipment	Notes
18 September 2014	(Germany) Jens Voigt	43	Velodrome Suisse, Grenchen, Switzerland (altitude 450m)	51.110 (New record)	(United States) Trek Bicycle Corporation	Triathlon handlebar, Trek carbon fibre tubing frame, disc wheels, chain on a 55/14 gear ratio.	First attempt under the new rule-set and oldest record holder at 43 years old and one day. Set new German national record.
30 October 2014	(Austria) Matthias Brändle	24	World Cycling Centre Aigle, Switzerland (altitude 380m)	51.852 (New record)	(Switzerland) IAM Cycling	Triathlon handlebar, SCOTT carbon fibre tubing frame, disc wheels, chain on a 55/13 gear ratio.	Set new Austrian national record.
31 January 2015	(Australia) Jack Bobridge	24	Darebin International Sports Centre, Melbourne, Australia	51.300 (Failure)	Cycling Australia	Triathlon handlebar, Cervelo carbon fibre tubing frame, disc wheels.	Failed to set new hour record. Beat Brad McGee's previous Australian national record of 50.300 km set in 2000.
8 February 2015	(Australia) Rohan Dennis	24	Velodrome Suisse, Grenchen, Switzerland (altitude 450m)	52.491 (New record)	(United States) BMC Racing Team	Triathlon handlebar, BMC carbon fibre tubing frame, disc wheels, chain on a 56/14 gear ratio.	Beat Jack Bobridge's previous Australian national record of 51.300 km set in January 2015.
25 February 2015	(Netherlands) Thomas Dekker	30	Aguascalientes Bicentenary Velodrome, Aguascalientes, Mexico	52.221 (Failure)	(Netherlands) Koga	Koga TeeTeeTrack with Mavic Comete Track wheels, Koga components, Rotor cranks with a KMC (3/32") chain on a 58/14 gear ratio.	First attempt at altitude (2000 m). Failed to set new hour record. Set new Dutch national record.
14 March 2015	(Sweden) Gustav Larsson	34	Manchester Velodrome, Manchester, United Kingdom	50.016 (Failure)	(United Kingdom) Revolution Series (Denmark) Cult Energy Pro Cycling	Ridley carbon track bike with front and rear disc wheels, triathlon handlebars.	Failed to set new hour record. Set new Swedish national record, beating previous record of 45.335 km.
2 May 2015	(United Kingdom) Alex Dowsett	26	Manchester Velodrome, Manchester, United Kingdom	52.937 (New record)	(Spain) Movistar Team	Canyon Speedmax WHR carbon track bike, with Campagnolo Pista disc wheels, Pista crankset with 54 or 55 or 56t chainring.	Set new British national record, beating Chris Boardman's record of 49.441 km set in 2000.
7 June 2015	(United Kingdom) Bradley Wiggins	35	Lee Valley VeloPark, London, United Kingdom	54.526 (New record)	(United Kingdom) Team Wiggins	Pinarello Bolide HR, SRAM Crankset, modified front fork, custom printed handlebars, 58/14 gear ratio.	Set new British national record, beating Alex Dowsett's record. Set CURRENT sea-level world best.
21 March 2016	(Switzerland) Micah Gross		Velodrome Suisse, Grenchen, Switzerland	48.255 (Failure)	(Switzerland) RSC Aaretal Münsingen		Set a new Swiss national record, beating the previous record of 48.199 km.
16 September 2016	(United States) Tom Zirbel	37	Aguascalientes Bicentenary Velodrome, Aguascalientes, Mexico	53.037 (Failure)	(United States) Rally Cycling	Modified Diamondback Serios time trial bike, fitted with special HED disc wheels and a gearing of 53/13	Failed to set new hour record. Set new American national record, beating Norman Alvis's record of 51.505 km set in 1997.
28 January 2017	(Denmark) Martin Toft Madsen	31	Ballerup Super Arena, Ballerup, Denmark	~~52.114~~; ~~(Failure)~~	(Denmark) BHS–Almeborg Bornholm	Argon 18 Electron Pro, Mavic Comete discs, SRM + Fibre-Lyte chain ring, and a gearing of 54/13	Failed to set new hour record. Attempt voided for doping, after Madsen's consumption of a contaminated food supplement.
25 February 2017	(Switzerland) Marc Dubois		Velodrome Suisse, Grenchen, Switzerland	48.337 (Failure)	(Switzerland) Team Humard Vélo-Passion	RB1213 track bike with double DT Swiss disc wheels	Set a new Swiss national record, beating the previous record of 48.255 km held by Micah Gross.
2 July 2017	(Poland) Wojciech Ziolkowski	32	Arena Pruszków, Pruszków, Poland	49.470 (Failure)	(Poland) Team JF Duet Prinzwear	BMC Trackmachine TR01, Mavic Comete disc wheels, Custom Prinzwear TT Suit	Set a new Polish national record, beating the previous record of 47.618 km held by Andrzej Bartkiewicz.
7 October 2017	(Denmark) Mikkel Bjerg	18	Odense Cykelbane, Odense, Denmark	52.311 (Failure)	(Denmark) Team Giant–Castelli	Giant trinity track bike, Mavic disc wheels	Failed to set new hour record. Set new Danish national record, beating Ole Ritter's record of 48.879 km set in 1974.
11 January 2018	(Denmark) Martin Toft Madsen	32	Ballerup Super Arena, Ballerup, Denmark	52.324 (Failure)	(Denmark) BHS–Almeborg Bornholm	Argon 18 Electron Pro, Mavic Comete discs, SRM + Fibre-Lyte chain ring, and a gearing of 54/13	Failed to set new hour record. Set new Danish national record, beating Mikkel Bjerg's record of 52.311 km set in 2017.
26 July 2018	(Denmark) Martin Toft Madsen	33	Aguascalientes Bicentenary Velodrome, Aguascalientes, Mexico	53.630 (Failure)	(Denmark) BHS–Almeborg Bornholm	Argon 18 Electron Pro, Mavic Comete discs, SRM + Fibre-Lyte chain ring, and a gearing of 54/13	Failed to set new hour record. Set new Danish national record, beating his own previous record of 52.324 km set in January 2018.
22 August 2018	(Netherlands) Dion Beukeboom	29	Aguascalientes Bicentenary Velodrome, Aguascalientes, Mexico	52.757 (Failure)	(Netherlands) Vlasman Cycling Team	Customized Giant Trinity road frame, with a gearing of 58/14	Failed to set new hour record. Set new Dutch national record.
4 October 2018	(Denmark) Mikkel Bjerg	19	Odense Cykelbane, Odense, Denmark	53.730 (Failure)	(United States) Hagens Berman Axeon	Giant trinity track bike, Mavic disc wheels	Failed to set new hour record. Set new Danish national record, beating Martin Toft Madsen's record of 53.630 km set in July 2018.
16 April 2019	(Belgium) Victor Campenaerts	27	Aguascalientes Bicentenary Velodrome, Aguascalientes, Mexico (altitude 1887m)	55.089 (New record)	(Belgium) Lotto Soudal	Ridley Arena Hour Record bike, 330mm custom handlebars, custom handlebar extensions specifically moulded for Campenaerts's forearms, F-Surface Plus aero paint, Campagnolo drivetrain, full carbon disc Campagnolo Ghibli wheels, C-Bear bottom bracket bearings.	Set new hour record Set new Belgian national record
13 August 2019	(Denmark) Martin Toft Madsen	34	Odense Cykelbane, Odense, Denmark	53.975 (Failure)	(Denmark) BHS–Almeborg Bornholm		Failed to set new hour record. Set new Danish national record, beating Mikkel Bjerg's record of 53.730 km set in October 2018.
6 October 2019	(Denmark) Mathias Norsgaard	22	Odense Cykelbane, Odense, Denmark	52.061 (Failure)	(Denmark) Riwal-Readynez		Failed to set new hour record.
18 September 2020	(Switzerland) Claudio Imhof	30	Velodrome Suisse, Grenchen, Switzerland (altitude 450m)	52.116 (Failure)			Set new Swiss national record.
23 October 2020	(Canada) Lionel Sanders	32	Milton, Canada	51.304 (Failure)	(Germany) Canyon Bicycles		Set new Canadian national record, beating Ed Veal's record of 48.587 km set in September 2017
3 November 2021	(United Kingdom) Alex Dowsett	33	Aguascalientes Bicentenary Velodrome, Aguascalientes, Mexico (altitude 1887m)	54.555 (Failure)	(United Kingdom) Factor Bikes	Factor Hanzo time trial bike (track version), Aerocoach Aten chainring with 61/13 gearing, Aerocoach Ascalon extensions, custom Vorteq skinsuit, HED Volo disc wheels, Izumi Super Toughness KAI chain	Failed to set new hour record. Set new British national record.
19 August 2022	(United Kingdom) Daniel Bigham	30	Velodrome Suisse, Grenchen, Switzerland (altitude 450m)	55.548 (New record)	(United Kingdom) INEOS Grenadiers	Prototype Pinarello Bolide F HR 3D	Set new hour record
8 October 2022	(Italy) Filippo Ganna	26	Velodrome Suisse, Grenchen, Switzerland (altitude 450m)	56.792 (New record)	(United Kingdom) INEOS Grenadiers	Pinarello Bolide F HR 3D, 64t chain ring, 14t rear sprocket, Princeton Carbonworks wheelset, custom Bioracer Katana suit	Set new hour record Beat Boardman's Best Human Effort
14 August 2025	(United Kingdom) Charlie Tanfield	28	Konya Velodrome, Konya, Turkey (altitude 1200m)	53.976 (Failure)	(United Kingdom) British Cycling	Hope-Lotus HB.T	Failed to set new hour record.

=== Unified hour record attempts (women's) ===
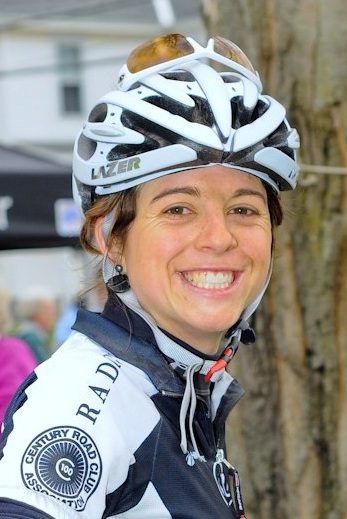
Former record holder Evelyn Stevens pictured in 2009

The last women's hour record before the unified rule change was set on 1 October 2003 by Leontien van Moorsel, with a distance of 46.065 km (28.623 mi).

In December 2014, it was announced that British Paralympian Sarah Storey would be the first woman to attempt the record following the unified rule change. She attempted the record on 28 February 2015 at Lee Valley Velo Park in London, setting new British, Para-Cycling and Masters Age 35–39 records but missing out on the Elite record with a distance of 45.502 km (28.274 mi).

American Molly Shaffer Van Houweling broke the women's UCI Hour Record, riding a distance of 46.273 km (28.753 mi) on 12 September 2015 in Aguascalientes, Mexico. Van Houweling had set three new US Hour Records in the year prior. The first was set on 15 December 2014, in Carson, California, with a distance of 44.173 km (27.448 mi). The second was set on 25 February 2015, in Aguascalientes with a distance of 45.637 km (28.358 mi). The third was set on 3 July 2015, also in Aguascalientes, with a distance of 46.088 km (28.638 mi). This last mark was also the Pan-American and World Masters Age 40–44 record at the time, and exceeded the distance of the UCI hour record of van Moorsel. However, it did not qualify as the UCI Hour Record because Van Houweling had only been enrolled in the athlete biological passport program for three and a half months prior to setting this record. The UCI requires that riders be enrolled in this program for 5–10 months before they are eligible to set this mark. From 24 August 2015, Van Houweling was eligible to attempt the UCI Hour Record.

In October 2015, Australian rider Bridie O'Donnell announced her intention to aim for the hour record in January 2016. She broke the women's hour at the Adelaide Super-Drome on 22 January 2016, riding 46.882 km (29.131 mi). She was aged 41 years. Her record was broken by American rider Evelyn Stevens in the next month - the new record was 47.980 km (29.813 mi), more than a kilometre nearer to the 50 km (31 mi) barrier.

Italian rider Vittoria Bussi, after two unsuccessful attempts on 7 October 2017 and on 12 September 2018, broke Stevens's world record by 27 metres riding 48.007 km (29.830 mi) on 13 September 2018.

British cyclist Joss Lowden set a new world record on 30 September 2021 with a distance of 48.405 km (30.077 mi), beating the previous record by just under 400 metres, and also surpassing Jeannie Longo's Best Human Effort distance. Lowden completed a total of 193 laps of the Tissot Velodrome in Grenchen, Switzerland.

On October 13, 2023, Vittoria Bussi set the world record again, at the Velodromo Bicentenario in Mexico, with a 50.267 km distance.

==== Women's UCI hour record attempts and record holders (since the rule revision in 2014) ====
Women's UCI hour record attempts and record holders (since the rule revision in 2014)
Date	Rider	Age	Velodrome	Distance (km)	Supported by	Equipment	Notes
28 February 2015	(United Kingdom) Sarah Storey	37	Lee Valley VeloPark, London, United Kingdom	45.502 (Failure)	(United Kingdom) Revolution Series	Ridley Arena Carbon track bike with triathlon bars, Pro rear disc wheel, front disk wheel, Shimano Dura-Ace groupset.	Beat Yvonne McGregor's previous British national record of 43.689 set in April 2002. New C5 Para-record, New Masters Age 35–39 record.
12 September 2015	(United States) Molly Shaffer Van Houweling	42	Aguascalientes Bicentenary Velodrome, Aguascalientes, Mexico (altitude 1887m)	46.273 (New record)	Metromint Cycling	Cervelo T4 track bike with double Mavic Comete discwheels, running 56/14 gear ratio.	Beat her own national record of 46.088 km set on 3 July 2015, also in Aguascalientes, Mexico.
22 January 2016	(Australia) Bridie O'Donnell	41	Super-Drome, Adelaide, Australia	46.882 (New record)		Cervelo T4 track bike.	Set a new World Record, new sea-level World Best and National Record, besting Anna Wilson's former Australian national record of 43.501 km (set on October 18, 2000).
27 February 2016	(United States) Evelyn Stevens	32	OTC Velodrome, Colorado, United States of America (altitude 1840m)	47.980 (New record)	(Netherlands) Team SD Worx–Protime (United States) USA Cycling	Specialized Shiv modified for the track, SRAM groupset with 53t or 54t chainrings, Zipp 900 front wheel, Zipp Super 9 rear disc, Bioracer skinsuit.	Beat American national record. Outdoor 333.3 meter banked cement track.
21 July 2017	(New Zealand) Jaime Nielsen	32	Avantidrome, Cambridge, New Zealand	47.791 (Failure)			Failed to beat the absolute hour record. Set CURRENT sea-level world's best. New Zealand national record.
7 October 2017	(Italy) Vittoria Bussi	30	Aguascalientes Bicentenary Velodrome, Aguascalientes, Mexico	47.576 (Failure)		Giant Trinity track bike with Walker Brothers double-disc wheels	Failed to beat the hour record. Beat Italian national record
13 September 2018	(Italy) Vittoria Bussi	31	Aguascalientes Bicentenary Velodrome, Aguascalientes, Mexico (altitude 1887m)	48.007 (New record)		Endura skin suit, HVMN Ketone, and Liv Bike	Failed to beat the hour record one day before, abandoning after 40 minutes. Beat the hour record by 27 metres the next day.
30 September 2021	(United Kingdom) Joscelin Lowden	33	Velodrome Suisse in Grenchen, Switzerland (altitude 450m)	48.405 (New record)	(United Kingdom) Drops–Le Col	LeCol x McLaren Skinsuit, Poc Tempor Helmet Argon18 Electron Pro track frame, WattShop Cratus chainrings (64x15 gear ratio) and WattShop Pentaxia Olympic/Anemoi handlebars/extensions, FFWD Disc-T SL wheels (front and rear w/ 23c Vittoria Pista tyres). Lowden may have used an 8.5mm pitch chain supplied by New Motion Labs.	Beat Vittoria Bussi's record by 398 metres, and Jeannie Longo's best human effort by 246 metres.
23 May 2022	(Netherlands) Ellen van Dijk	35	Velodrome Suisse in Grenchen, Switzerland (altitude 450m)	49.254 (New record)		Trek Speed Concept, Bontrager Race Space handlebar, Zipp Sub 9 Track wheels, Bontrager Hilo XXX saddle, 58x14 gear ratio	Beat Joscelin Lowden's record by 849 metres.
13 October 2023	(Italy) Vittoria Bussi	36	Aguascalientes Bicentenary Velodrome, Aguascalientes, Mexico (altitude 1887m)	50.267 (New record)		Pinarello Bolide HR track bike, disc wheels (front and rear), custom integrated cockpit	Beat Ellen van Dijk's record by 1013 metres.
10 May 2025	(Italy) Vittoria Bussi	37	Aguascalientes Bicentenary Velodrome, Aguascalientes, Mexico (altitude 1887m)	50.455 (New record)		Pinarello Bolide HR track bike, disc wheels (front and rear), custom integrated cockpit	Beat her own record by 188 metres.

== Statistics ==
The above chart depicts the progression of the men's hour record over time (click to enlarge). Blue markers indicate attempts made under the UCI hour record, orange markers indicate attempts made under the UCI best human effort rules, and green markers indicate attempts made under the unified rules.

The above chart depicts the progression of the women's hour record over time (click to enlarge). Blue markers indicate attempts made under the UCI hour record, orange markers indicate attempts made under the UCI best human effort rules, and green markers indicate attempts made under the unified rules.

== Para-cycling records ==
The new regulations for the making of accepted hour record attempts were extended to para-cycling in 2016. Although the first attempt on the hour record for women after the amendments to the regulations was made by Paralympian Sarah Storey, it was not a ratified attempt on the women's C5 hour record under the new conditions, which at that point still did not extend to paracycling – albeit that Storey's effort is recognized as a best C5 performance under the new rules, in addition to a British and masters world hour record in able-bodied cycling.

The first attempt on a para-cycling hour record after the new regulations were extended to para-cycling was by Irishman Colin Lynch in the C2 category, bettering the accepted best performance previously set by Laurent Thirionet in 1999 by 2 kilometres, and setting the first 'ratified' para-cycling world hour record. The mark of 43.133 km was achieved on 1 October at the National Cycling Centre in Manchester, Great Britain.

=== Men's UCI para-cycling hour record ===
Unified regulations (since 2016)

C1 Men's UCI para-cycling hour record holders
Date	Rider	Age	Velodrome	Distance (km)	Supported by	Equipment	Notes
1 December 2018	(Germany) Michael Teuber	50	Berlin, Germany	42.583			

C2 Men's UCI para-cycling hour record holders
Date	Rider	Age	Velodrome	Distance (km)	Supported by	Equipment	Notes
1 October 2016	(Republic of Ireland) Colin Lynch	45	Manchester Velodrome, Manchester, England	43.133			
16 July 2022	(Belgium) Ewoud Vromant	39	Tissot Velodrome, Grenchen, Switzerland	46.521			

C5 Men's UCI para-cycling hour record holders
Date	Rider	Age	Velodrome	Distance (km)	Supported by	Equipment	Notes
14 August 2025	(United Kingdom) William Bjergfelt	46	Konya Velodrome, Konya, Turkey	51.471			First Para-cyclist in history go beyond 50 km

=== Women's UCI para-cycling hour record ===
Unified regulations (since 2016)

C5 Women's UCI para-cycling hour record holders
Date	Rider	Age	Velodrome	Distance (km)	Supported by	Equipment	Notes
28 February 2015	(United Kingdom) Sarah Storey	37	Manchester Velodrome Manchester, England	45.502 (New record)			

=== Historical para-cycling hour record ===
Men's UCI para-cycling hour record – Best Hour Performance & Absolute Hour Record (1991–2016)

C5 Men's UCI para-cycling hour record holders
Date	Rider	Age	Velodrome	Distance (km)	Supported by	Equipment	Notes
11 September 1991	(France) Francisco Trujillo		Bordeaux, France	44.661			Best Hour Performance
13 December 2014	(Italy) Andrea Tarlao		Montichiari Velodrome, Montichiari, Italy	47.569			Absolute Hour Record

C3 & CP3 Men's UCI para-cycling hour record holders
Date	Rider	Age	Velodrome	Distance (km)	Supported by	Equipment	Notes
25 September 1995	(United Kingdom) Thomas Evans		Manchester Velodrome Manchester, England	40.070			Best Hour Performance
8 January 2005	(United Kingdom) Darren Kenny		Manchester Velodrome Manchester, England	41.817			Best Hour Performance
14 February 2009	(United Kingdom) Darren Kenny		Copenhagen, Denmark	40.516			Absolute Hour Record

C2 Men's UCI para-cycling hour record holders
Date	Rider	Age	Velodrome	Distance (km)	Supported by	Equipment	Notes
6 November 1999	(France) Laurent Thirionet		Bordeaux, France	41.031			Best Hour Performance

C1 Men's UCI para-cycling hour record holders
Date	Rider	Age	Velodrome	Distance (km)	Supported by	Equipment	Notes
8 May 2005	(Germany) Michael Teuber	37	Augsburg, Germany	39.326			Best Hour Performance

Tandem Men's UCI para-cycling hour record holders
Date	Rider	Age	Velodrome	Distance (km)	Supported by	Equipment	Notes
11 November 1994	(Netherlands) Jan Mulder (Netherlands) Richard Belmer		Moscow, Russia	48.696			Best Hour Performance
29 November 1997	(France) Herve Dechamp (France) Guy Rouchouzo		Bordeaux, France	49.625			Best Hour Performance

Women's UCI para-cycling hour record – Best Hour Performance & Absolute Hour Record (1991–2016)

C5 Women's UCI para-cycling hour record holders
Date	Rider	Age	Velodrome	Distance (km)	Supported by	Equipment	Notes
28 February 2015	(United Kingdom) Sarah Storey		Lee Valley VeloPark, England	45.502			

Tandem Women's UCI para-cycling hour record holders
Date	Rider	Age	Velodrome	Distance (km)	Supported by	Equipment	Notes
19 September 2005	(Australia) Lindy Hou; Toireasa Gallagher		Dunc Gray Velodrome, Sydney, Australia	42.930			Absolute Hour Record

== Masters records ==
=== Current records by age-group ===
Age group	Male record	Distance (KM)	Female record	Distance (KM)
30–34	Spencer Seggebruch (USA)	50.686	Roxana Islas Garcia (MEX)	41.564
35–39	Gert Fouche (RSA)	51.599	Jane Emans (CAN)	42.425
40–44	James Ogilvie (AUS)	51.228	Molly Shaffer Van Houweling (USA)	47.061
45–49	Rob Scarlett (NZ)	51.623	Molly Shaffer Van Houweling (USA)	47.080
50–54	Patrick Warner (USA)	51.013	Anna Davis (AUS)	44.427
55–59	Patrick Warner (USA)	51.061	Anna Davis (AUS)	45.213
60–64	Peter Megdal (USA)	47.430	Elizabeth Heller (USA)	42.194
65–69	Peter Megdal (USA)	47.220	Jan Palchikoff (USA)	40.416
70–74	Scott Hennessy (USA)	43.216	Jan Palchikoff (USA)	38.191
75–79	Atty Duijn (NED)	38.903	Elizabeth Randall (AUS)	36.352
80–84	Derek Steel (CAN)	39.836	Patricia Baker (USA)	27.447
85–89	Walter Fowler (GBR)	34.602	No record set	
90–94	Carl Grove (USA)	34.498	No record set	
95–99	Peter Grandiek (NED)	22.948	No record set	
100–104	Robert Marchand (FRA)	26.925	No record set	
105+	Robert Marchand (FRA)	22.546	No record set	

=== Men's UCI Masters best performances ===
Best Performances

Age 30–34
Date	Rider	Age	Velodrome	Distance (km)	Supported by	Equipment	Notes
20 November 2004	(United States) Curtis Gunn		VELO Sports Center, Carson, United States of America	47.764 (New record)			
29 July 2017	(United Kingdom) Ryan Davies		Newport Velodrome, Newport, Wales	48.234 (New record)			
24 September 2017	(Canada) David Hainish		Mattamy National Cycling Centre, Milton, Canada	45.325 (Failed)			Failed to beat the previous hour record. Set a new national record.
21 July 2019	(Poland) Piotr Klin		Arena Pruszków, Pruszków, Poland	49.649(New record)			
18 August 2021	(Poland) Piotr Klin		Aguascalientes, Mexico	50.094 (New record)			
15 September 2023	(United States) Spencer Seggebruch		Velodrome Suisse, Grenchen, Switzerland (altitude 450m)	50.686 (New record)			

Age 35–39
Date	Rider	Age	Velodrome	Distance (km)	Supported by	Equipment	Notes
26 April 2009	(United States) Jayson Austin		Dunc Gray Velodrome, Sydney, Australia	48.315 (New record)			
6 October 2015	(Belgium) Filip Speybrouck	39	Manchester Velodrome Manchester, England	48.743 (New record)			
21 December 2017	(New Zealand) Rob Scarlett	38	Cambridge, New Zealand	48.922 (New record)			
22 August 2019	(South Africa) Gert Fouche	39	Aguascalientes Bicentenary Velodrome, Aguascalientes, Mexico	51.599 (New record)			

Age 40–44
Date	Rider	Age	Velodrome	Distance (km)	Supported by	Equipment	Notes
9 February 2013	(Australia) Jayson Austin	43	Dunc Gray Velodrome, Sydney, Australia	48.411 (New record)			
24 September 2017	(Canada) Ed Veal		Mattamy National Cycling Centre, Milton, Canada	48.587 (New record)			
27 January 2020	(Australia) James Ogilvie	40	Melbourne Arena Melbourne, Victoria	51.228 (New record)			

Age 45–49
Date	Rider	Age	Velodrome	Distance (km)	Supported by	Equipment	Notes
25 September 1999	(United States) Kent Bostick		Manchester Velodrome Manchester, England	49.361 (New record)			
22 November 2016	(Republic of Ireland) Greg Swinand		OTC Velodrome, Colorado, United States of America	46.895 (Failed)		Planet X track bike	Set a new Irish national hour record, beating the previous record of 46.166 of Tommy Evans – set in 1999 – by 729 metres
20 July 2017	(United States) Dan Bryant	47	Aguascalientes Bicentenary Velodrome, Aguascalientes, Mexico	47.458 (Failed)	Peet's Coffee Cycling Team		
22 September 2018	(United States) Colby Pearce	47	Aguascalientes Bicentenary Velodrome, Aguascalientes, Mexico	50.245 (New record)			
7 October 2020	Igor Kopse (SLO)	46	Velodrom Novo Mesto, Novo Mesto, Slovenia	50.590 (New record)			

Age 50–54
Date	Rider	Age	Velodrome	Distance (km)	Supported by	Equipment	Notes
				44.890 (New record)			
10 December 2009	(United States) Keith Ketterer	53	Home Depot Center velodrome, Carson, United States of America	45.386 (New record)			
9 October 2012	(United Kingdom) Charles McCulloch		Manchester Velodrome Manchester, England	47.960 (New record)			
4 October 2015	(Republic of Ireland) John Madden	50	Vélodrome National de Saint-Quentin-en-Yvelines, Saint-Quentin en Yvelines, France	45.799 (Failed)			
6 November 2016	(France) Pascal Montier	53	Vélodrome National de Saint-Quentin-en-Yvelines, Saint-Quentin en Yvelines, France	48.892 (New record)			
24 September 2017	(Canada) Michael Nash		Mattamy National Cycling Centre, Milton, Canada	46.434 (Failed)			Failed to beat the previous records. Set a new Canadian national record.
6 October 2017	(United States) Norman Alvis	54	OTC Velodrome, Colorado, United States of America	49.392 (New record)		Argon 18 Electron Pro, Mavic Comet front and rear disc wheels, 53/13 gearing	Set a new US Masters national hour record, beating the previous distance of 48.112 km (also held by Alvis).
17 November 2017	(Republic of Ireland) Greg Swinand		Aguascalientes Bicentenary Velodrome, Aguascalientes, Mexico	48.469 (Failed)		Planet X track bike	Set a new Irish national hour record, beating his own previous record of 46.860 km – set a year earlier in Colorado
29 September 2019	(United States) Norman Alvis	56	OTC Velodrome, Colorado, United States of America	49.383 (New record)			
22 June 2022	Patrick Warner (USA)		Aguascalientes Bicentenary Velodrome, Aguascalientes, Mexico	51.013 (New record)			

Age 55–59
Date	Rider	Age	Velodrome	Distance (km)	Supported by	Equipment	Notes
29 January 2012	(United States) Keith Ketterer	57	Home Depot Center velodrome, Carson, United States of America	45.019 (New record)			
19 March 2016	(New Zealand) Jim McMurray	55	Cambridge, New Zealand	47.733 (New record)			
20 July 2017	(United States) Kevin Metcalfe	55	Aguascalientes Bicentenary Velodrome, Aguascalientes, Mexico	49.121 (New record)	Peet's Coffee Cycling Team		
18 August 2021	(United States) Norman Alvis		Aguascalientes Bicentenary Velodrome, Aguascalientes, Mexico	49.387(New record)			
10 August 2024	(United States) Patrick Warner		Aguascalientes Bicentenary Velodrome, Aguascalientes, Mexico	51.061(New record)			

Age 60–64
Date	Rider	Age	Velodrome	Distance (km)	Supported by	Equipment	Notes
	(United States) Kenny Fuller	61		44.228 (New record)			
30 September 2015	(United Kingdom) Robert Gilmour	64	Newport Velodrome, Newport, Wales	44.349 (New record)	Hounslow & District Wheelers		49x14 gearing with a trispoke front and a rear disc, fitted with track tubulars
31 January 2020	(Slovenia) Andrej Žavbi	60	Arena Pruszków, Pruszków, Poland	45.732 (New record)	Alenka Žavbi Kunaver	S WORKS SHIV TT bike, VISION METRON track disk, BERK DILA seddle	Chainring 56, Track Cog 14
29 April 2021	(Slovenia) Andrej Žavbi	61	Velodrom Novo Mesto, Novo Mesto, Slovenia	46.255 (New record)	Alenka Žavbi Kunaver	S WORKS SHIV TT bike, VISION METRON track disk, BERK DILA seddle	Chainring 57, Track Cog 14
8 May 2021	(New Zealand) Jim McMurray	60	Cambridge, New Zealand	47.360 (New record)			

Age 65–69
Date	Rider	Age	Velodrome	Distance (km)	Supported by	Equipment	Notes
11 October 2012	(Netherlands) Jim Brander	65	Manchester Velodrome Manchester, England	43.742 (New record)			
26 October 2016	(United Kingdom) Robert Gilmour	65	Newport Velodrome, Newport, Wales	44.271 (New record)	Hounslow & District Wheelers		
23 February 2020	(Australia) Roger Cull	66	Dunc Gray Velodrome, Sydney, Australia	44.62 (New record)			
24 August 2024	(Canada) Ralph Schatzmair	65	Mattamy National Cycling Centre, Milton, Canada	44.662 _{(New Record)}			_{[139]}
8 February 2025	(Slovenia) Andrej Žavbi	65	Novo mesto Velodrome, Novo mesto, Slovenia	46.142 (New record)	Kolesarska zveza Slovenije		

Age 70–74
Date	Rider	Age	Velodrome	Distance (km)	Supported by	Equipment	Notes
14 September 2014	(United Kingdom) Mike Cotgreave	70	Newport Velodrome, Newport, Wales	41.227 (New record)			
15 July 2017	(United States) Scott Hennessy	70	Aguascalientes Bicentenary Velodrome, Aguascalientes, Mexico	43.216 (New record)			

Age 75–79
Date	Rider	Age	Velodrome	Distance (km)	Supported by	Equipment	Notes
				33.000 (New record)			
October 2012	(Italy) Giuseppe Marinoni	75	Montichiari Velodrome, Montichiari, Italy	35.728 (New record)			
29 July 2014	(United States) Jim Turner	75	Aguascalientes Bicentenary Velodrome, Aguascalientes, Mexico	38.494 (New record)			
28 March 2022	Atty Duijn (NED)		Amsterdam, Netherlands	38.903 (New record)			

Age 80–84
Date	Rider	Age	Velodrome	Distance (km)	Supported by	Equipment	Notes
2014	(United Kingdom) Sidney Schuman	84	Lee Valley VeloPark, London, United Kingdom	28.388 (New record)	London Cycling Campaign	Condor track bike	
October 2015	(New Zealand) Peter Grandiek		SIT Velodrome, Southland, New Zealand	29.187 (New record)			
29 October 2015	(United Kingdom) Walter Fowler	81	Newport Velodrome, Newport, Wales	35.772 (New record)	Stourbridge Cycling Club		
25 June 2016	(France) Paul Martinez	82	Vélodrome National de Saint-Quentin-en-Yvelines, Saint-Quentin en Yvelines, France	38.657 (New record)			
20 August 2017	(Italy) Giuseppe Marinoni		Mattamy National Cycling Centre, Milton, Canada	38.334 (Failed)		Marinoni bike, 53/14 gearing	
24 September 2017	(Italy) Giuseppe Marinoni		Mattamy National Cycling Centre, Milton, Canada	39.004 (New record)		Marinoni bike, 53/14 gearing	

Age 85–89
Date	Rider	Age	Velodrome	Distance (km)	Supported by	Equipment	Notes
8 October 2016	(France) Gilbert Douillard	87	Vélodrome du Lac, Bordeaux, France	34.095 (New record)			
22 September 2019	(United Kingdom) Walter Fowler	85	Newport Velodrome, Newport, Wales	34.602 (New record)	Stourbridge Cycling Club		

Age 90–94
Date	Rider	Age	Velodrome	Distance (km)	Supported by	Equipment	Notes
23 October 2017	(France) René Gaillard	90	Vélodrome National de Saint-Quentin-en-Yvelines, Saint-Quentin en Yvelines, France	29.278 (New record)	Cyclosport Club de Vesoul		
6 August 2019	(United States) Carl Grove	91	OTC Velodrome, Colorado, United States of America	34.498 (New record)			

Age 95–99
Date	Rider	Age	Velodrome	Distance (km)	Supported by	Equipment	Notes
27 April 2019	(New Zealand) Reg Rye	96	Cambridge, New Zealand	20.151 (New record)	Avantidrome Velodrome		
21 October 2026	(Netherlands) Peter Grandiek	95	ILT Stadium Southland Velodrome, New Zealand	22.948 (New record)			

Age 100–104
Date	Rider	Age	Velodrome	Distance (km)	Supported by	Equipment	Notes
1 February 2012	(France) Robert Marchand	101	World Cycling Centre Aigle, Switzerland	24.250 (New record)			
31 October 2014	(France) Robert Marchand	103	Vélodrome National de Saint-Quentin-en-Yvelines, Saint-Quentin en Yvelines, France	26.925 (New record)			

Age 105+
Date	Rider	Age	Velodrome	Distance (km)	Supported by	Equipment	Notes
4 January 2017	(France) Robert Marchand	105	Vélodrome National de Saint-Quentin-en-Yvelines, Saint-Quentin en Yvelines, France	22.546 (New record)			

=== Women's UCI Masters best performances ===
Best Performances

Age 30–34
Date	Rider	Age	Velodrome	Distance (km)	Supported by	Equipment	Notes
6 April 2012	(Mexico) Roxana Islas Garcia	30	Aguascalientes Bicentenary Velodrome, Aguascalientes, Mexico	41.564 (New record)			

Age 35–39
Date	Rider	Age	Velodrome	Distance (km)	Supported by	Equipment	Notes
2000	(United States) Jacqui Lockwood		Manchester Velodrome Manchester, England	40.7556 (New record)			
14 March 2015	(South Africa) Adelia Reynek	38	Dunc Gray Velodrome, Sydney, Australia	41.386 (New record)	Midland Cycle Club		
14 May 2016	(United Kingdom) Clarice Chung	35	Newport Velodrome, Newport, Wales	42.116 (New record)	SSLL Racing Team	Cervelo T4 track bike, Zipp disc wheels	
24 September 2017	(Canada) Jane Emans		Mattamy National Cycling Centre, Milton, Canada	42.425 (New record)			

Age 40–44
Date	Rider	Age	Velodrome	Distance (km)	Supported by	Equipment	Notes
3 July 2015	(United States) Molly Shaffer Van Houweling	42	Aguascalientes Bicentenary Velodrome, Aguascalientes, Mexico	46.088 (New record)	Metromint Cycling	Cervelo T4 track bike with double Mavic Comete discwheels, running 56/14 gear ratio.	
14 July 2017	(United States) Molly Shaffer Van Houweling	44	Aguascalientes Bicentenary Velodrome, Aguascalientes, Mexico	47.061 (New record)			

Age 45–49
Date	Rider	Age	Velodrome	Distance (km)	Supported by	Equipment	Notes
10 September 2006	(United States) Lilian Pfluke		Manchester Velodrome Manchester, England	41.2397 (New record)			
24 September 2017	(Canada) Jody Levine		Mattamy National Cycling Centre, Milton, Canada	38.156 (Failure)			
24 September 2018	(United States) Molly Shaffer Van Houweling	46	Aguascalientes Bicentenary Velodrome, Aguascalientes, Mexico	46.897 (New record)			
19 August 2019	(United States) Molly Shaffer Van Houweling	47	Aguascalientes Bicentenary Velodrome, Aguascalientes, Mexico	47.080 (New record)			

Age 50–54
Date	Rider	Age	Velodrome	Distance (km)	Supported by	Equipment	Notes
19 March 2011	(Italy) Patrizia Spadaccini	51	Montichiari Velodrome, Montichiari, Italy	39.402 (New record)			
26 March 2017	(Australia) Anna Davis	52	Melbourne Arena Melbourne, Victoria	43.206 (New record)			
24 September 2017	(Canada) Bryn Currie		Mattamy National Cycling Centre, Milton, Canada	40.366 (Failed)			Failed to beat the previous record. Set a new national record.
9 March 2018	(Australia) Anna Davis	53	Melbourne Arena Melbourne, Victoria	44.427 (New record)			

Age 55–59
Date	Rider	Age	Velodrome	Distance (km)	Supported by	Equipment	Notes
31 October 2014	(United States) Clemence Ruth	55	VELO Sports Center, Carson, United States of America	40.946 (New record)			
27 January 2020	(Australia) Anna Davis	55	Melbourne Arena Melbourne, Victoria	43.963 (New record)			
4 February 2022	(Australia) Anna Davis	57	Melbourne Arena Melbourne, Victoria	45.213 (New record)			

Age 60–64
Date	Rider	Age	Velodrome	Distance (km)	Supported by	Equipment	Notes
31 October 2014	(United States) Jan Palchikoff	63	VELO Sports Center, Carson, United States of America	41.116 (New record)			
7 April 2019	(United States) Elizabeth Heller	62	Aguascalientes Bicentenary Velodrome, Aguascalientes, Mexico	42.194 (New record)			

Age 65–69
Date	Rider	Age	Velodrome	Distance (km)	Supported by	Equipment	Notes
1 March 2010	(Australia) Elizabeth Randall	65	Melbourne Arena Melbourne, Victoria	37.214 (New record)			
28 September 2017	(United States) Jan Palchikoff	66	VELO Sports Center, Carson, United States of America	38.191 (New record)			

Age 70–74
Date	Rider	Age	Velodrome	Distance (km)	Supported by	Equipment	Notes
20 October 2018	Roi Speed (NZL)	72	Cambridge, New Zealand	36.581 (New record)			
12 December 2021	(United States) Jan Palchikoff	71	Los Angeles, United States of America	40.416 (New record)			

Age 75–79
Date	Rider	Age	Velodrome	Distance (km)	Supported by	Equipment	Notes
31 October 2014	(United States) Patricia Baker	75	VELO Sports Center, Carson, United States of America	27.894 (New record)			
10 February 2019	(Australia) Elizabeth Randall	75	Melbourne Arena Melbourne, Victoria	36.352 (New record)			

Age 80–84
Date	Rider	Age	Velodrome	Distance (km)	Supported by	Equipment	Notes
1 September 2019	(United States) Patricia Baker	80	VELO Sports Center, Carson, United States of America	27.447 (New record)			

== Junior records ==
Although the UCI does not recognise hour record attempts at the Junior age-group, there have been multiple record attempts made.

Men's UCI hour record attempts and record holders (since the rule revision in 2014)
Date	Rider	Age	Velodrome	Distance (km)	Supported by	Equipment	Notes
21 November 2016	(United States) Luke Mullis	17–18	Colorado Springs, USA	47.595 (New record)			Set new national record.
29 September 2021	(Australia) Aston Freeth	17	Adelaide Super-Drôme, Adelaide, Australia	48.480 (New record)	Port Adelaide Cycling Club / South Australian Sports Institute		Set new national record.
14 March 2022	(Wales) Fred Meredith	17	Geraint Thomas National Velodrome, Newport, Wales	49.184 (New record)	Holohan Coaching Race Team		Set new national record.
17 October 2022	(United States) Jonas Walton	18	Aguascalientes Velodrome, Mexico	50.792 (New record)			Set new national record.

== Other bicycle hour records ==
There are alternative bicycle hour records that do not fit the UCI-sanctioned categories due to a strict definition of a "bicycle" in UCI.

Other Hour records
Distance km	Rider	Gender	Hour record type	Comments	Year
92.439	(Switzerland) Francesco Russo	Men's	HPV	Vehicle: Metastretto - designed by rider, streamlined 2-wheeled recumbent, backwards ridden, mirror navigated.	2016
84.02	(France) Barbara Buatois	Women's	HPV	4th fastest person at the time. Vehicle: Varna Tempest - low-racer, 2-wheeled FWD, SWB, canopy bubble	2009
83.013	(Switzerland) Rubin Koch, Dominik Dusek	Men's	HPV multi-rider, HPV tandem, HPV tricycle.	Vehicle: Cieo Tandem tricycle – Independent drivetrain, captain supine elevated above stoker – laying on back headfirst	2013
81.63	(Australia) Kyle Lierich	Men's	HPV tricycle (single rider)	Vehicle: Phantom Mini-T – designed & built by Tim Corbett	2019
66.042	(France) Barbara Buatois	Women's	HPV tricycle	Vehicle: Varna 24 - Delta trike (two wheels in back), head bubble, FWD	
60.61	(United States) Ron Elder	Men's	HPV upright position		1989
57.637	(Germany) Matthias König	Men's	Recumbent bike – Unfaired	Vehicle: Modified M5 highracer recumbent, SRM crankset. Estimated 325 watts power output.	2016
51.31	(United States) Ron Skarin	Men's	Streamlined Enclosed Upright Bicycle	Titanium road racing bike with stretched fabric fairing by Chet Kyle. First "modern" HPV record.	1979
51.194	(England) Zac Carr & Glenn Taylor	Men's	Tandem	UK National Tandem. Unconfirmed as World Tandem Record.	2003
50.492	(Wales) James Coxon	Men's	Recumbent Tricycle – unfaired	Vehicle: Phantom Mini-T – Designed & built by Tim Corbett	2022
46.946	(United States) Andy Baker & Matti Herz	Men's	Madison Hour Record	Outdoor track, Vehicles: Fixed gear with aerobars	2023
46.7	(England) Daniel Bigham	Men's	Road Time Trial (TT) Bike	Outdoor track, recorded on Strava. Vehicle: Trek Speed Concept	2015
44.749	(Netherlands) Jetze Plat	Men's	Arm Powered	Vehicle: Recumbent trike	2019
42.93	(Australia) Lindy Hou & Toireasa Gallagher	Women's	Tandem open, Tandem paralympic	Visually-impaired stoker (Lindy Hou)	2005
38.154	(Slovenia) Bor Ceh	Men's	Cargo Utility Bike	Vehicle: Omnium – aerobars, rear 700c disk, front 20 inch, unloaded, wood platform removed due to windy conditions	2018
37.417	(United States) Erik Skramstad	Men's	No hands riding. Mountain bike at altitude.	Vehicle: Aluminium mountain bike	2009
35.258	(Czech Republic) Eva Navratilova	Women's	Ice tricycle (unfaired, recumbent)	Vehicle: Rear wheel powered, front skate steering, rear outrigger skate	2015
35.245	(United States) Mike Mowett	Men's	Mountain bike (low altitude)	Outdoor, on hilly loop road. Vehicle: Mountain bike with knobby tires and aerobar, shirtless	2006
34.547	(England) Chris Opie	Men's	Penny farthing	Unpaced. Also holds paced penny farthing record 35.743 km. (Penny farthing record rules allow pacing.)	2019
33.365	(France) Simon Jan	Men's	Unicycle	Vehicle: geared 36" unicycle	2021
30.95	(Switzerland) Manuel Scheidegger	Men's	Wheelie (riding a bike on one wheel)	Outdoor	2020
23.412	(Canada) Lizanne Wilmot	Women's	Penny Farthing	Unpaced on the Jerry Baker Velodrome in Redmond, Washington USA	2023
20.294	(Italy) Alberto Bona	Men's	Penny Farthing, riding using one leg only	The left pedal was removed entirely from the penny farthing, ensuring that it could not be used.	2024
19.76	(Germany) Jochen Glasbrenner	Men's	Riding using one leg only	Outdoor on road time trial bike	2020
19.3	(Belgium) Jonas De Brauwer	Men's	Wooden bike	Vehicle: Wooden bike built by himself and students, wood chain, 8 spokes, aerobar	2016
17.7	(Australia) Nigel Barker	Men's	PediCab/Ricksaw	No passenger	2019
0.918	(Italy) Maria Vittoria Sperotto	Women's	Slowest hour record	Requires gears, no fixed gear, no brakes, always moving forward. Tied with Davide Formolo in Pursuit-style race.	2021
0.918	(Italy) Davide Formolo	Men's	Slowest hour record	Requires gears, no fixed gear, no brakes, always moving forward. Tied with Maria Sperotto in Pursuit-style race.	2021

== Timing of the record ==
At the conclusion of the hour, the rider is inevitably part-way round a lap. They complete that lap (meaning they actually cycle for more than an hour). The distance completed in the hour is determined by adding the fraction of that final lap, calculated from the ratio of the time remaining at the start of that lap to the time taken for that lap, to the preceding completed laps.

Times are required to be measured to a thousandth of a second. Distances are rounded down to a complete metre and records can be beaten only by at least one metre.
