= List of United States records in track cycling =

The following are the national records in track cycling in the United States maintained by the United States' national cycling federation: USA Cycling.

== Men ==
Key to tables: Awaiting ratification Record not kept by USA Cycling Not ratified or later rescinded by the USA Cycling

Event	Record	Athlete	Date	Meet	Place	Ref
Flying 200m time trial	9.598	James Mellen	6 September 2019	Pan American Championships	Cochabamba, Bolivia	
250m time trial (standing start)	17.659	David Espinoza	10 September 2014	Pan American Championships	Aguascalientes, Mexico	
Flying 500m time trial	26.461	Ethan Boyes	24 September 2018		Aguascalientes, Mexico	
1km time trial	59.563	Eric Young	8 September 2019	Pan American Championships	Cochabamba, Bolivia	
Team sprint	44.031	Matthew Baranoski; Nathan Koch; Kevin Mansker	10 February 2013	Pan American Championships	Mexico City, Mexico	
4000m individual pursuit	3:59.930	Ashton Lambie	18 August 2021		Aguascalientes, Mexico	
4000m individual pursuit (sea level)	4:03.237	Ashton Lambie	22 October 2021	World Championships	Roubaix, France	
4000m team pursuit	3:47.503	Ashlin Barry; David Domonoske; Graeme Frislie; Anders Johnson	14 March 2025	Nations Cup	Konya, Turkey	
Hour record	53.037 km	Tom Zirbel	16 September 2016		Aguascalientes, Mexico	

== Women ==
Event	Record	Athlete	Date	Meet	Place	Ref
Flying 200m time trial	10.555	Madalyn Godby	10 August 2017		Aguascalientes, Mexico	
Flying 200m time trial	10.414	Madalyn Godby	6 September 2019	Pan American Championships	Cochabamba, Bolivia	
250m time trial (standing start)	18.999	Emily Hayes	2 April 2025	Pan American Championships	Asunción, Paraguay	
Flying 500m time trial	29.662	Jennie Reed	16 June 2008		Carson, United States	
500m time trial (standing start)	33.797	Mandy Marquardt	17 June 2023	Pan American Championships	San Juan, Argentina	
Team sprint (500 m)	33.353	Madalyn Godby; Mandy Marquardt	29 August 2018	Pan American Championships	Aguascalientes, Mexico	
Team sprint (750 m)	47.631 (Note: by official result source; 47.430 by USA Cycling, a typo)	Emily Hayes; Kayla Hankins; Hayley Yoslov	22 October 2025	World Championships	Santiago, Chile	
Team sprint (1000 m)	1:04.485	Emily Hayes; Kayla Hankins; Hayley Yoslov	24 August 2025	U.S. Championships	Colorado Springs, United States	
1 km time trial	1:06.207	Mandy Marquardt	24 August 2025	U.S. Championships	Colorado Springs, United States	
3000m individual pursuit	3:15.663 WR	Chloé Dygert	19 October 2024	World Championships	Ballerup, Denmark	
4000m individual pursuit	4:39.350	Anna Hicks	22 August 2025	U.S. Championships	Colorado Springs, United States	
4000m individual pursuit	4:26.127	Chloé Dygert	25 October 2025	World Championships	Santiago, Chile	
3000m team pursuit	3:16.853	Sarah Hammer; Dotsie Bausch; Jennie Reed	4 August 2012	Olympic Games	London, Great Britain	
4000m team pursuit	4:04.306	Jennifer Valente; Lily Williams; Chloé Dygert; Kristen Faulkner	7 August 2024	Olympic Games	Saint-Quentin-en-Yvelines, France	
Hour record	47.980 km	Evelyn Stevens	27 February 2016		Colorado Springs, United States	
