= List of Bangladeshi records in track cycling =

The following are the national records in track cycling in Bangladesh, maintained by its national cycling federation, Bangladesh Cycling Federation.

== Men ==
Event	Record	Athlete	Date	Meet	Place	Ref
Flying 200 m time trial						
250 m time trial (standing start)	21.730	Khandakar Mahabub Hossian	20 June 2022	Asian Championships	New Delhi, India	
Flying 500 m time trial						
500 m time trial	38.073	Khandakar Mahabub Hossian	20 June 2022	Asian Championships	New Delhi, India	
Flying 1 km time trial						
1 km time trial	1:13.986	Khandakar Mahabub Hossian	20 June 2022	Asian Championships	New Delhi, India	
Team sprint	55.074	Md Muktadur al Hasan; Biswas Faisal Hossain; Khandakar Mahabub Hossian	18 June 2022	Asian Championships	New Delhi, India	
4000 m individual pursuit	5:37.293	Khandakar Mahabub Hossian	19 June 2022	Asian Championships	New Delhi, India	
4000 m team pursuit	5:11.609	Md Muktadur al Hasan; Biswas Faisal Hossain; Khandakar Mahabub Hossian; Md Helal Mia	18 June 2022	Asian Championships	New Delhi, India	
Hour record						

== Women ==
Event	Record	Athlete	Date	Meet	Place	Ref
Flying 200 m time trial	13.949	Sampati Biswas Aurthi	20 June 2022	Asian Championships	New Delhi, India	
250 m time trial (standing start)	25.131	Sampati Biswas Aurthi	18 June 2022	Asian Championships	New Delhi, India	
Flying 500 m time trial						
500 m time trial						
Flying 1 km time trial						
1 km time trial						
Team sprint	1:03.878	Sampati Biswas Aurthi; Tithi Biswas; Snigdha Akter	18 June 2022	Asian Championships	New Delhi, India	
3000 m individual pursuit	5:04.807	Rita Khatun	19 June 2022	Asian Championships	New Delhi, India	
4000 m team pursuit	6:17.554	Snigdha Akter; Sampati Biswas Aurthi; Tithi Biswas; Rita Khatun	18 June 2022	Asian Championships	New Delhi, India	
Hour record						
