= Bridie O'Donnell =

Australian cyclist and doctor

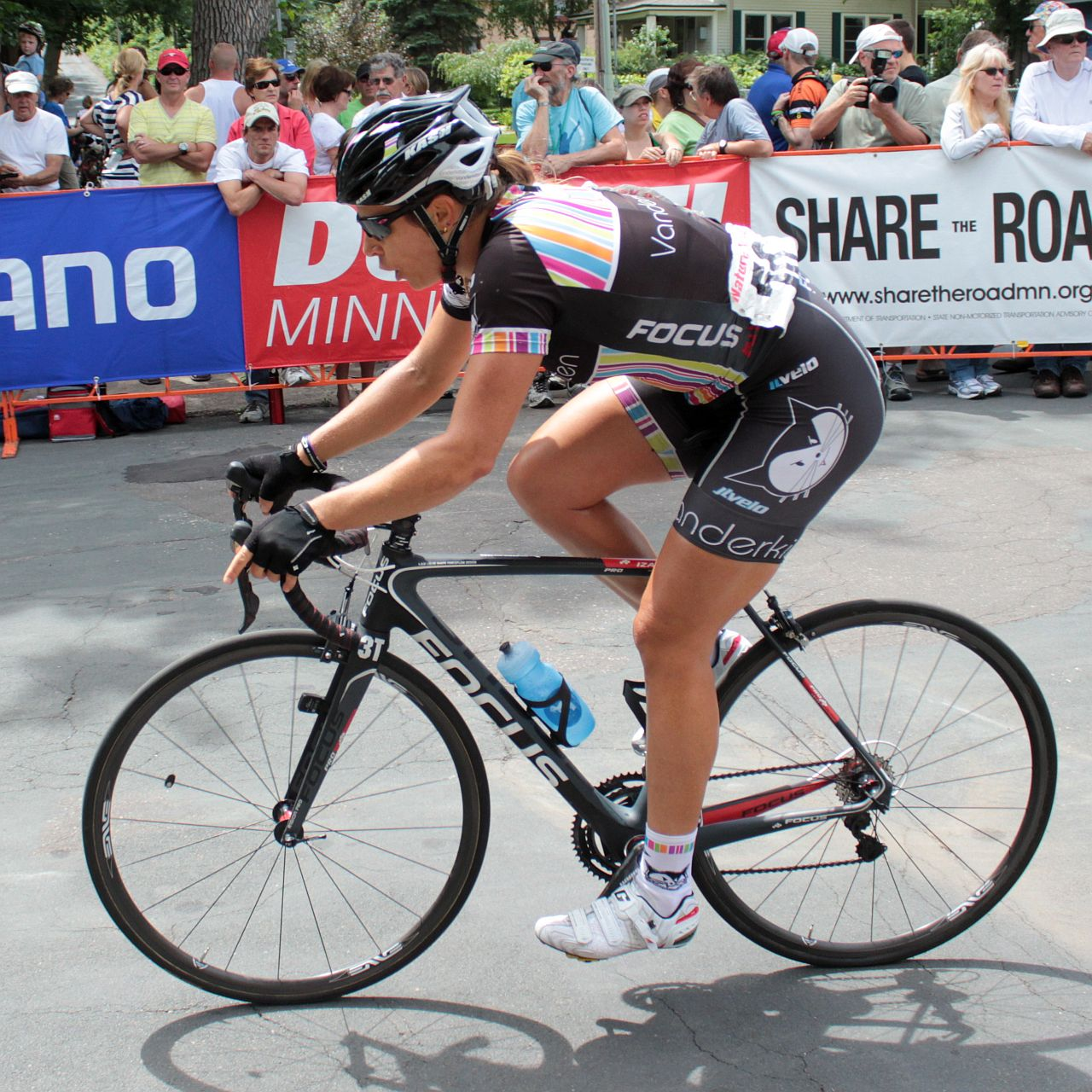
- O'Donnell in 2012

Personal information
- Born: Australia

Cycling career
- Sport: Cycling
- Discipline: Road
- Role: Rider

Amateur team
- 2012: Vanderkitten–Focus

Professional teams
- 2010: Team Valdarno Umbria
- 2011: Top Girls–Fassa Bortolo

Major wins
- Hour record 46.882 km (22 January 2016)

Bridie O'Donnell is a public servant, author, sports broadcaster, medical practitioner and former professional road cyclist. She represented Australia at the 2008, 2009 and 2010 UCI Road World Championships.

O'Donnell was a medical practitioner and surgical assistant before taking up cycling, and later returned to medicine to work in health assessment.

On 22 January 2016 O'Donnell broke the Women's Hour record at the Adelaide Super-Drome. She rode 46.882 kilometres, exceeding the distance set by Molly Shaffer Van Houweling the previous September by 609 metres.

== Post cycling career ==
O'Donnell is a medical doctor, graduating from the University of Queensland's school of medicine in 1998, and was appointed the inaugural head of the Office for Women in Sport and Recreation for the Victorian State Government in 2017. She was employed by Australian TV network Special Broadcasting Service (SBS) as a commentator for the 2020 Tour de France, the first woman to do so for SBS. She has continued to commentate on every Tour de France since.

In May 2021 O'Donnell was appointed to the board of the Collingwood Football Club. She came under fire for being a Western Bulldogs supporter and not having been a club member for the required two years. She resigned after four months after accepting a COVID-19 response role with the Department of Health.

In November 2021 she was inducted onto the Victorian Honour Roll of Women.

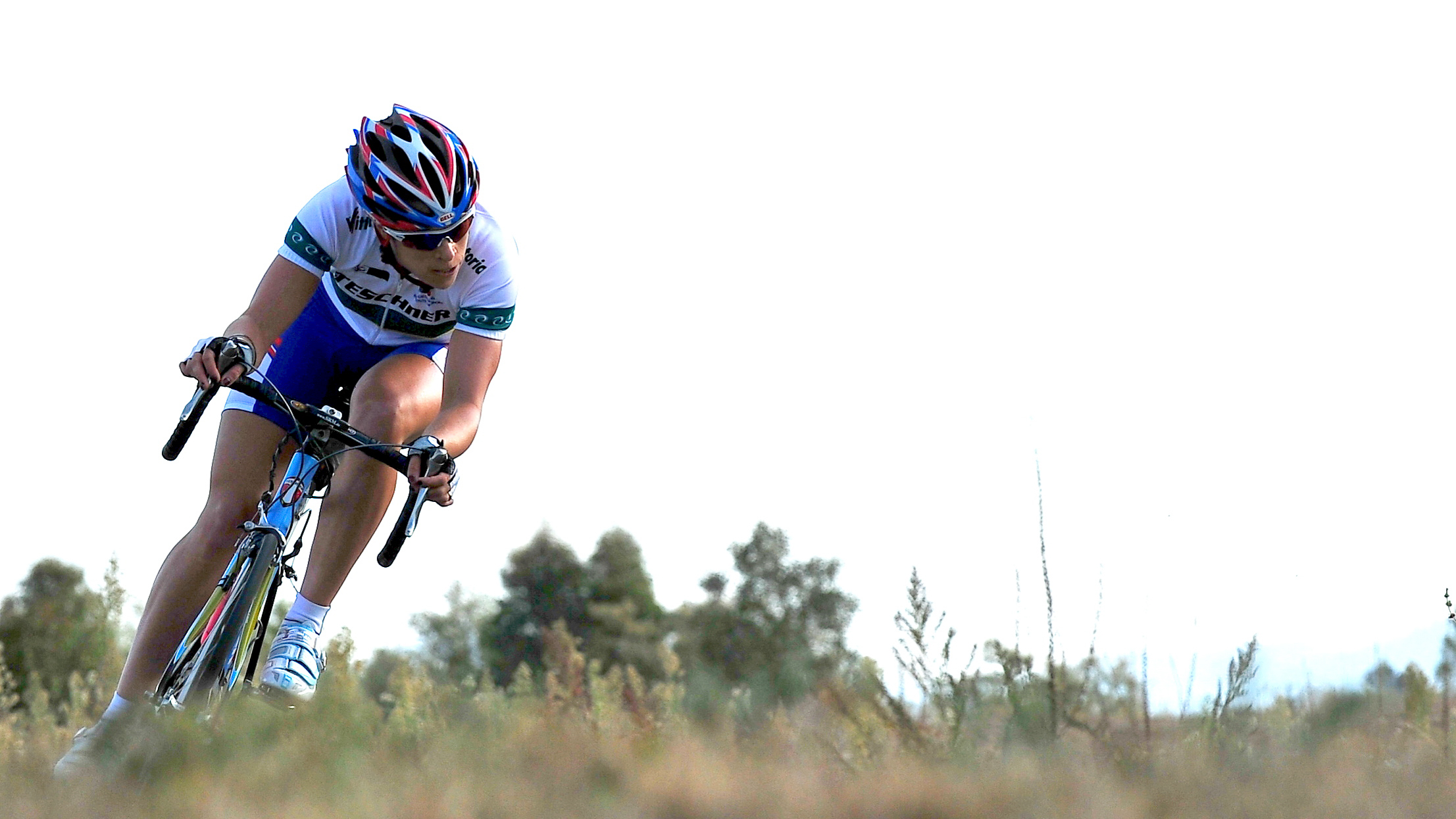
Bridie O'Donnell on her way to winning the ACT Criterium Championships - Stromlo 2008.

== Major results ==
2007
1st Time trial, Oceania Road Championships
2nd Chrono des Nations
7th Chrono Champenois – Trophée Européen
2008
1st Time trial, National Road Championships
4th Chrono des Nations
10th Memorial Davide Fardelli
2009
1st Time trial, Oceania Road Championships (January)
Oceania Road Championships (November)

1st Road race
3rd Time trial

2nd Overall Tour de PEI
5th Chrono Champenois
7th Memorial Davide Fardelli
2010
National Road Championships

2nd Road race
2nd Time trial

8th Memorial Davide Fardelli
2011
Oceania Road Championships

2nd Road race
2nd Time trial

4th Time trial, National Road Championships
2012
3rd Time trial, Oceania Road Championships
3rd Time trial, National Road Championships
2013
7th Chrono des Nations
2014
3rd Time trial, National Road Championships
Oceania Road Championships

5th Time trial
10th Road race

2015
2nd Time trial, National Road Championships
2016
World Hour record 46.882 km (22 January 2016)
2nd Time trial, Oceania Road Championships

== Works ==
- Life and death : a cycling memoir, Melbourne : Slattery Media Group, 2018. ISBN 9781921778674, OCLC 1039100343
