= Superdrome =

Superdrome may refer to:

- Adelaide Super-Drome, a velodrome in Adelaide, South Australia, Australia
- Perth High Performance Centre, formerly the Superdrome, a sports complex in Perth, Western Australia, Australia

== See also ==
- Superdome (disambiguation)
