= Oscar Van den Eynde =

Oscar Van den Eynden
Personal information
- Full name: Denis Joannes Oscar Van den Eynden
- Nickname: Maurice
- Born: 16 March 1867 Mechelen, Belgium
- Died: 2 November 1936 (aged 69) Antwerp, Belgium

Cycling career
- Sport: Cycling
- Disciplines: Road; Track

Major wins
- Course La Coulisse théâtrale et Sportive (1891); World hour record (1897)
Medal record
Men's track cycling
Belgian National Track Championships
Gold medal – first place	1891 Brussels	Amateur sprint
Gold medal – first place	1891 Brussels	10 km
Bronze medal – third place	1890 Leuven	Amateur sprint
Bronze medal – third place	1890 Leuven	10 km

Denis Joannes Oscar Van den Eynden (16 March 1867 – 2 November 1936) was a Belgian road and track racing cyclist. Van den Eynden's younger brother, Hippolyte, was also a racing cyclist.

In 1890, Van den Eynden finished third in the amateur sprint and 10 km events at the Belgian National Track Championships, held in Leuven. In 1891, the Belgian championships were held in Brussels, where he won two events: the amateur sprint and the 10 km event for elite riders. That year, he also won the Course La Coulisse théâtrale et Sportive, a race which started and finished in Brussels and passed through Antwerp, Herentals, Aarschot and Leuven.

On 30 July 1897, Van den Eynden broke the world hour record at the newly opened Vélodrome de Vincennes in Paris, covering a distance of 39.240 kilometres. The record had previously been held for three years by the French Jules Dubois, who had covered 38.220 kilometres in Paris at the Buffalo Velodrome. Van den Eynden thus became the first Belgian to hold the world hour record. He was followed as a Belgian holder of the record in 1967 by Ferdinand Bracke, and subsequently by Eddy Merckx and Victor Campenaerts.

== Major results ==
1889
1st Spa handicap (road)
1st Huy - Grande Internationale
1890
(bronze) Amateur sprint, Belgian National Track Championships
(bronze) Amateur 10 km, Belgian National Track Championships
2nd Namur (10 km handicap; 29 June)
2nd Namur (10 km handicap; 31 August)
2nd Parc du Cinquantenaire "Prix du Roi"

1891
(gold) Amateur sprint, Belgian National Track Championships
(gold) 10 km, Belgian National Track Championships
1st Course La Coulisse théâtrale et Sportive
1st Bruxelles-Parc du Cinquantenaire

1897
World hour record – 39.240 km
