= Superdome =

Superdome or Super Dome may refer to:

== Places ==
- Burswood Dome (formerly Burswood Superdome), an arena in Perth, Australia
- Caesars Superdome (originally Louisiana Superdome and formerly Mercedes-Benz Superdome), a multi-purpose stadium in New Orleans, Louisiana
- Jeddah Super Dome, an event space in Jeddah, Saudi Arabia
- Sydney SuperDome (formerly Acer Arena), an arena in Sydney, Australia

== Other ==
- HP Superdome server
- Super Dome (railcar), built by Pullman-Standard for the Chicago, Milwaukee, St. Paul and Pacific Railroad ("Milwaukee Road")
- Superdome (film), a 1978 ABC television movie

== See also ==
- Superdrome (disambiguation)
