= Molly Shaffer Van Houweling =

American cyclist, academic and legal scholar

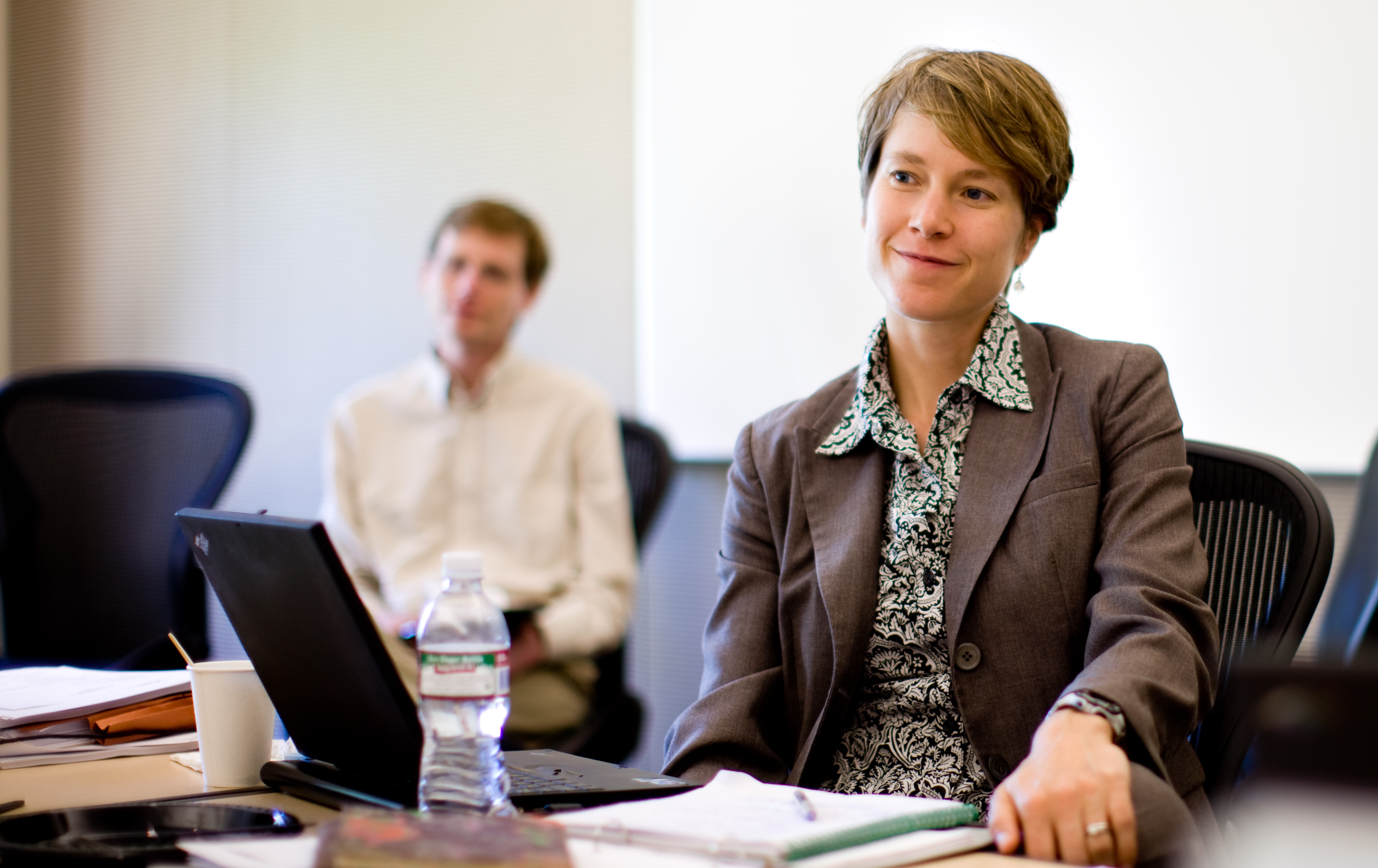
- Molly S. Van Houweling at a Creative Commons board meeting in 2008

Personal information
- Full name: Molly Shaffer Van Houweling
- Born: January 3, 1973 (age 53) United States

Cycling career
- Sport: Cycling
- Discipline: Road
- Role: Rider
- Rider type: Time Triallist

Amateur teams
- 2007: JL Velo Cycling Team
- 2007–2013: Metromint Cycling

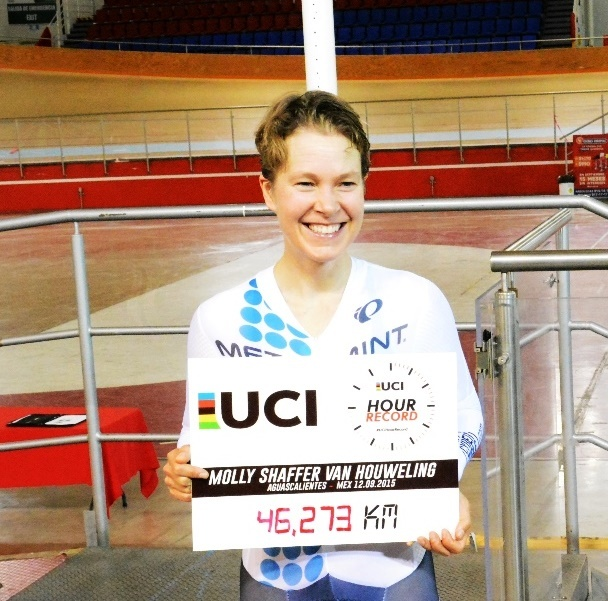
Molly Shaffer Van Houweling pictured after her UCI hour record setting ride on September 12, 2015.

Molly Shaffer Van Houweling (born March 1, 1973) is an American cyclist, academic and legal scholar. Van Houweling is Professor of Law at the UC Berkeley School of Law and founding President and Treasurer of Creative Commons. Van Houweling is also on the board of Authors Alliance a non-profit organization that helps authors disseminate their work broadly. Van Houweling also serves as an Associate Reporter for the American Law Institute Restatement of Copyright. She received her J.D. from the Harvard Law School in 1998. After law school she clerked for Judge Michael Boudin of the U.S. Court of Appeals for the First Circuit, and then in 2000-2001 for Justice David Souter of the U.S. Supreme Court. She was previously on the faculty of the University of Michigan Law School before moving to UC Berkeley.

In addition to her work as a legal academic and copyright activist, Shaffer Van Houweling is also a competitive bicycle racer. On September 12, 2015, she set a new Hour record by cycling 46.273 km in an hour. Van Houweling is also a six-time UCI Amateur Road World Champion, most recently winning the time trial titles at the 2018 UCI World Cycling Tour Final in Varese, Italy.

== Palmares ==
2007
1st Northern California/Nevada Time Trial Championship

2009
1st Northern California/Nevada Time Trial Championship
1st Colorado Time Trial Championship

2010
1st Overall Mt. Hood Cycling Classic

1st Stage 2

1st Overall Kern County Women's Stage Race
1st Overall Topsport Stage
1st Copperopolis Road Race
1st Northern California/Nevada Time Trial Championship
1st Stage 1 Valley of the Sun Stage Race

2011
1st UCI Masters World Championship Time Trial (W35-39)
1st Overall Valley of the Sun Stage Race

1st Stage 1

1st Northern California/Nevada Road Race Championship
1st Northern California/Nevada Time Trial Championship

2012
UCI Masters World Championship (W35-39)

1st Time Trial
1st Road Race

1st Overall Mariposa Women's Stage Race
1st Northern California/Nevada Time Trial Championship
1st Northern California/Nevada Prestige Series

2014
UCI Masters World Championship (W40-44)

1st Time Trial
1st Road Race

1st Northern California/Nevada Time Trial Championship
US Hour Record 44.173km

2015
UCI Hour Best Performance (W40-44) 46.088km
UCI Hour Record 46.273km
UCI Masters World Championship (W40-44)

1st Time Trial
1st Road Race

1st Northern California/Nevada Time Trial Championship

2016
Masters National Track Championships

1st Individual Pursuit (W40-44)

National Records

40km Time Trial Record (W40-44), 52:48
Individual Pursuit (W40-44), 2:30.613
Kilo (W40-44), 1:16.104

2017
UCI Masters World Track Championships

1st Team Pursuit (W40-44)
1st Individual Pursuit (W40-44)

National Track Championships

1st Team Pursuit
2nd Individual Pursuit

World Bests

UCI Hour Best Performance (W40-44), 47.061km
UCI Best Performance 2km Pursuit (W40-44), 2:24.753

National Records

Kilo (W40-44), 1:14.772
Team Pursuit (W40-44), 3:48.259

2018
UCI Masters World Road Championship (W45-49)

1st Time Trial

National Track Championships

1st Team Pursuit
2nd Individual Pursuit

World Bests

UCI Hour Best Performance (W45-49), 46.897km

National Records

40km Time Trial Record (W45-49), 55:16.626

2019
National Track Championships

1st Individual Pursuit

2022
UCI Masters World Road Championship (W45-49)

3rd Time Trial

3rd UCI Masters World Gravel Championship (W45-49)

2023
UCI Masters World Road Championship (W50-54)

2nd Time Trial

== UCI Hour record attempts ==
Date	Location	Distance (km)	Difference to record (m) (Note: (+) indicates behind the current record (-) indicates ahead of the current record)	Notes
December 2014	Carson, CA, United States	44.173	1892 (+)	New national record. Beat Carolyn Donnellys 44.028 km distance set in 1990.
February 2015	Aguascalientes, Mexico	45.637	698 (+)	New national record.
July 7, 2015	Aguascalientes, Mexico	46.088	23 (-)	New national record. This attempt also beat the previous UCI hour record of 46.065 km but as Van Houweling was not part of the athletes biological passport programme the attempt did not count.
September 12, 2015	Aguascalientes, Mexico	46.273	208 (-)	Beat the 12-year-old record held by Dutchwoman Leontien van Moorsel. Note, Van Moorsel rode a 'Merckx-style' bike.

== UCI Masters Hour Best Performance attempts ==
Date	Location	Distance (km)	Difference to record (m) (Note: (+) indicates behind the current record (-) indicates ahead of the current record)	Notes
July 15, 2017	Aguascalientes, Mexico	47.061	973 (+)	New national record and world best performance for Women 40-44, exceeding Van Houweling's own W40-44 record set on July 7, 2015.
September 24, 2018	Aguascalientes, Mexico	46.897	5,658 (-)	New national record and world best performance for Women 45-49, exceeding Lillian Pfluke's W45-49 US and World record set in of 41.239 set in Manchester, England in 2006.

== See also ==
- List of law clerks for the third seat of the Supreme Court of the United States

Records
Preceded by Leontien van Moorsel	UCI women's hour record (46.273 km); September 12, 2015 – January 22, 2016	Succeeded by Bridie O'Donnell
