= Vélodrome de Bordeaux =

Cycling venue in Bordeaux, France

- Interactive map of Vélodrome de Bordeaux
- Location: Bordeaux, France
- Coordinates: 44.899259°N 0.565720°W
- Capacity: 4560

Construction
- Groundbreaking: 1987
- Opened: 9 October 1989

The Vélodrome de Bordeaux is a velodrome in Bordeaux, France. It hosted the UCI Track Cycling World Championships in 1998 and 2006. Building started in 1987 and the velodrome was opened on 9 October 1989.

The arena hosts cycling and athletics facilities. The cycling track is 250 metres (270 yd) long. For athletics, there is an elliptical four-lane 200 m (220 yd) track, a 60 m (66 yd) sprinting track and areas for jumps and throws. There are seats for 4560 spectators.

== See also ==
- List of cycling tracks and velodromes

Preceded by Perth SpeedDome; Perth	UCI Track Cycling World Championships; Venue; 1998	Succeeded by Velodrom; Berlin
Preceded by VELO Sports Center; Los Angeles	UCI Track Cycling World Championships; Venue; 2006	Succeeded by Palma Arena; Palma de Mallorca
