= Velo Sports Center =

Velodrome in Carson, California, U.S.

VELO Sports Center
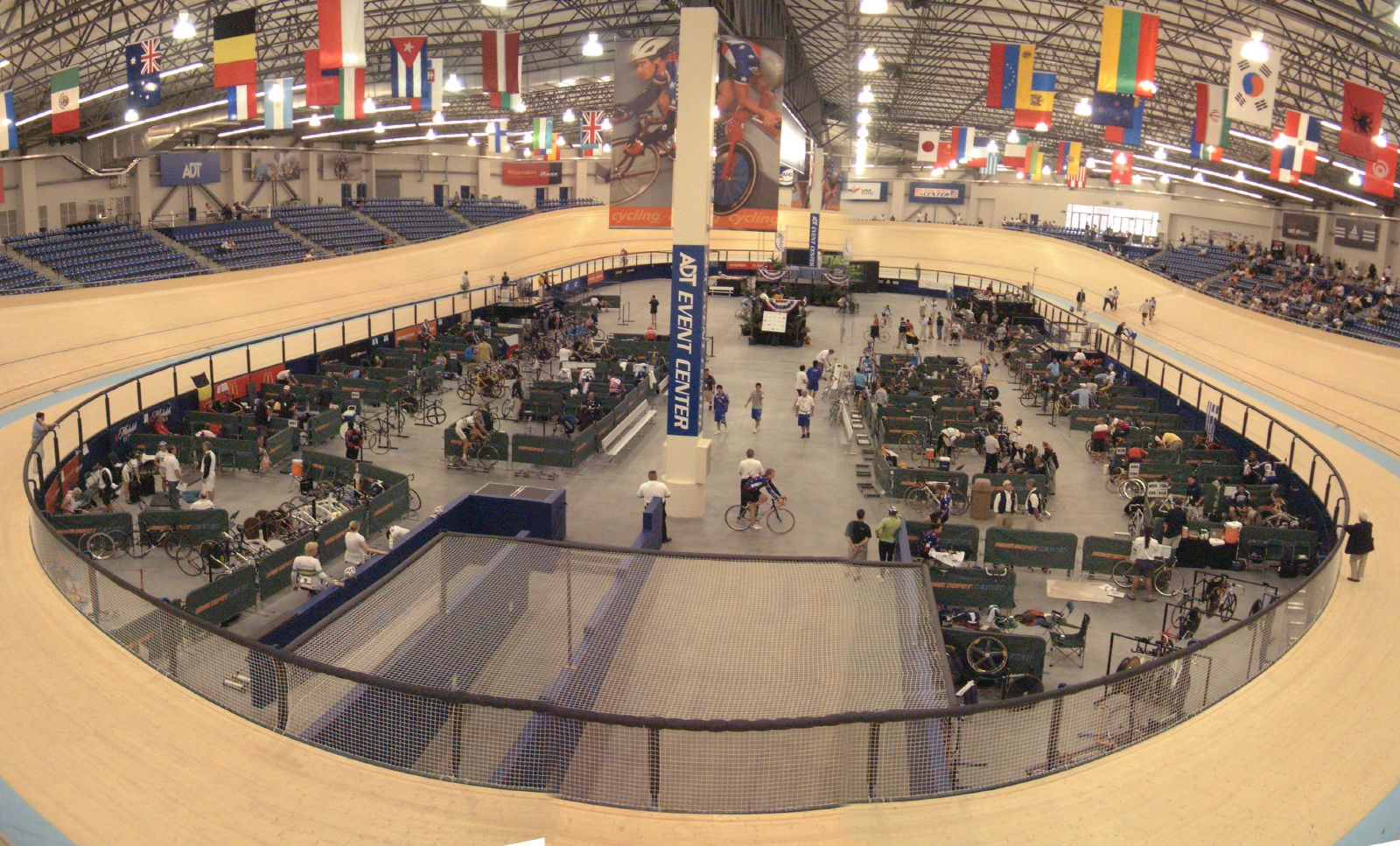
- VELO Sports Center during Junior Worlds 2004
- Interactive map of VELO Sports Center
- Location: Carson, California, United States
- Coordinates: 33°51′32″N 118°15′35″W
- Capacity: 2,450
- Surface: Siberian pine (250 m or 270 yd)

Construction
- Opened: 2004
- Architect: Rossetti
- Structural engineers: John A. Martin & Associates
- General contractor: PCL Construction

The VELO Sports Center is a velodrome in Carson, California, United States. It is currently the only cycling track of its kind in the US. Formerly known as the ADT Event Center or LA Velodrome, it opened in 2004 on the California State University, Dominguez Hills Campus, part of the Dignity Health Sports Park complex. The facility is owned and operated by Anschutz Entertainment Group (AEG).

The track has hosted the 2004 UCI Junior Track World Championships, 2005 UCI Track Cycling World Championships, 2006-2008 UCI Track Cycling World Cups, 2012 and 2017 UCI Para-cycling Track World Championships and 2024 Pan American Track Cycling Championships. It will host the 2028 Summer Olympics' Cycling competitions. The Official Olympic and Paralympic Training Site is home to USA Cycling’s national track cycling program, as well as for cyclists of all ages and ability levels year-round. It was the home of the Canadian Cycling Association’s national track cycling program.

== About the velodrome ==
The current indoor velodrome was built in 2004. The $15 million, multi-use facility was designed by Rossetti Architects with structural engineer John A Martin & Associates. It is a track at 250 m (820.21 ft) per lap that is 7 m (22.97 ft) wide, and has 45 degree banks. It is made of approximately 33 mi (53.11 km) of Siberian pine, and seats approximately 2,500 spectators. The VELO Sports Center is always kept at 72 °F (22.2 °C), and 50% humidity.

The track is open to all ages and ability levels, and encourages riders of all levels to try riding the track. Everyone who rides the velodrome must be track certified. The VELO Sports Center certifies riders on Saturday mornings at 10:30.

== Olympic legacy ==
=== Original venue and 1984 Summer Olympics ===
The VELO Sports Center is built just a few hundred meters south of the Los Angeles 1984 Summer Olympics Velodrome site, which stood where the soccer stadium is now built at Dignity Health Sports Park.

On February 4, 1981, California State University Dominguez Hills was selected as the site of the Olympic velodrome. CSU Dominguez Hills President Don Gerth was eager to include the university in the 1984 Olympics. When Olympic Organizing Committee Chair Peter Ueberroth asked Gerth if he would like to have the Olympic velodrome, he replied, "We’ll take it. What’s a velodrome?"

On July 9, 1981, construction began on the Olympic velodrome, and it was completed on time and under budget prior to the 8 July 1982 dedication and 7-Eleven/Bicycling Magazine Grand Prix on July 9-10th, 1982. The 7-Eleven velodrome was one of only three permanent facilities built specifically for the 1984 Olympic Games. The track was 333.333 metres (1,093.61 ft) in length, 6 metres (20 ft) wide, banked at 33 degrees in the turns, 9 degrees on the straights, and was made of concrete. Prior to the Games, the track experienced small hairline cracks. These were fixed by an epoxy injection system and series of grinding to reduce bumps common to concrete tracks, and the track was coated with polyurethane prior to the Olympics for the fastest possible surface. Riders said the track was “smooth but sticky." Permanent stands were built to accommodate 2,000 spectators, but with temporary seating additions capacity for the Games was between 6,400 and 8,000. The Los Angeles developer and contractor Stolte Inc. built the velodrome for $3 million. Prior to the Games, the Olympic velodrome was one of the most requested venues for tours.

The 1984 Games was perhaps the most successful in USA Cycling history. It was also the first Olympics to have Women's Cycling. The LAOOC petitioned for Women's Individual Sprint and Pursuit events, but the requests were denied by the IOC. Connie Carpenter-Phinney and Rebecca Twigg took the Gold and Silver Medals in the 45 women field in the Individual road race, the first in Olympic history. On the track, Mark Gorski won the Individual Sprint Gold over ‘The Cheetah’ Nelson Vails in the all USA Final, and Steve Hegg won the 4000m Individual Pursuit. Altogether the US won a record 9 medals in cycling events. After the Games it was revealed 1/3 of the US team received blood transfusions before the event, which was still 1 year before it was banned by the IOC.

=== 2028 Summer Olympics and Paralympics ===
During the 2028 Summer Olympics, the VELO Sports Center will host indoor track cycling as well as the fencing portion of Modern Pentathlon. The venue will host also host track cycling during the 2028 Summer Paralympics.

== Other uses ==
The VELO Sports Center is a multi-use facility that has hosted volleyball and basketball tournaments, Taekwondo Tournaments, and most recently the 2013 CrossFit Games. It is also the home of ERO-Sports, a world leader in bike fitting and aerodynamics testing. Using the new Track Aero System developed by Montreal-based company Alphamantis, ERO-Sports has effectively brought wind tunnel testing into the real world on the velodrome.

== See also ==
- List of cycling tracks and velodromes

Preceded by Melbourne Arena; Melbourne	UCI Track Cycling World Championships; Venue; 2005	Succeeded by Vélodrome de Bordeaux; Bordeaux
