= Robert Marchand (cyclist) =

French cyclist (1911–2021)

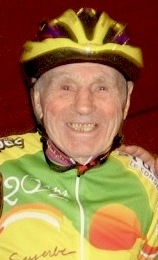
- Marchand in 2012

Personal information
- Born: 26 November 1911 Amiens, France
- Died: 22 May 2021 (aged 109) Mitry-Mory, France
- Height: 1.50 m (4 ft 11 in)

Sport
- Sport: Cycling

Robert Marchand (26 November 1911 – 22 May 2021) was a French centenarian cyclist. He was the holder of the world record for cycling 100 km and for the distance cycled in one hour, in both the 100–104 and over-105 years old age categories.

== Early life ==
Marchand was born in Amiens, near what was to later become the front line of World War I.

Marchand was a firefighter in Paris in the 1930s. He took an active part during the strikes of 1936 in France which gave birth to the modern era of French employment legislation. He was a prisoner-of-war during World War II. After liberation he moved to Venezuela, where he was a lorry driver and sugarcane planter. In the 1950s, he went to Canada, where he had a job as a lumberjack. He returned to France in 1960 and worked as a gardener and wine dealer until 1987.

He was a member of the French Communist Party and the CGT Trade Union, the longest-serving living member, with 90 years of membership. At the time of his death he was one of the oldest remaining World War II veterans.

== Cycling career ==
He returned to cycling in 1978 and continued training after his 100th birthday. In February 2012, he set a world record in one-hour track cycling in the over-100 age group at 24.250 kilometres (15.068 miles). He improved this record to 26.927 kilometres (16.732 miles) in January 2014.

On 4 January 2017, he set a world record in one-hour track cycling in the over-105 age group, covering 22.547 kilometres (14.010 miles) in one hour, and the 105 year old centenarian declared: "I could have done better, if I had seen the 10-minute warning card, otherwise I would have pedalled slightly faster".

At the age of 105 he was recognised as the world's oldest competitive cyclist by Guinness World Records.

Marchand put his fitness and longevity down to a diet consisting of: lots of fruit and vegetables, a little meat, not too much coffee – and an hour a day on the cycling home-trainer.

After he turned 106 Marchand's doctors advised him to stop competing for world records. He obliged, but refused to quit racing completely. In early February 2018, Marchand completed a 4,000-meter race in the same stadium where he made his last record.

Marchand celebrated his 107th birthday by going for a 20-kilometre bike ride in the Ardèche.

After his 108th birthday Marchand stopped riding bikes outdoors due to hearing loss.

== Physiology ==
Marchand's physiological capacity was the subject of scientific study during the final decade of his life. Between the ages of 101 and 103, researchers found that his VO2 max increased by 13%, from 31 to 35 ml/kg/min, while his peak power output increased from 90 to 125 watts. This improvement was attributed to a polarized training regimen consisting of 80% low-intensity mileage and 20% high-intensity work.

These findings were popularized by Dr. Peter Attia in his 2023 book Outlive: The Science and Art of Longevity. Attia cites Marchand as evidence that aerobic capacity remains "plastic" and can be significantly improved even past the age of 100, noting that Marchand's aerobic capacity at 103 was comparable to that of a healthy, sedentary 50-year-old.

== Death ==
Marchand died on 22 May 2021 at the age of 109.

== Recognition ==
In 2011 Col du Marchand, a mountain pass in Massif central, was renamed to Col Robert Marchand. Marchand himself rode it on his 103th birthday.
