= Tamara Novikova =

Soviet cyclist

Personal information
- Full name: Tamara Novikova
- Born: 6 June 1932 Soviet Union

Cycling career
- Sport: Cycling
- Disciplines: Road & Track
- Role: Rider

Major wins
- 1955 Female world record for 1 hour, 38.473 km
Medal record
Representing Soviet Union
Women’s Cycling
UCI Road World Championships
Silver medal – second place	1958	Road race

Tamara Novikova (born June 6, 1932 at Irkutsk, USSR) is a former female cyclist from the Soviet Union.

== Biography ==
=== Career ===
Novikova broke the women's World Record for 1 hour on July 7, 1955 when she covered 38.473 km, breaking the mark of Italian Alfonsina Strada that had stood for 26 years.

Novikova took the silver medal in the first UCI Road World Championships - Women's Road Race at Reims, France in 1958. She finished behind Elsy Jacobs of Luxembourg.

On the 'Cycling Rankings 1958 - 2006' she was ranked 45th.
