= Olympic Training Center Velodrome =

Velodrome in Colorado Springs, US

Coordinates: 38.829285°N 104.796199°W

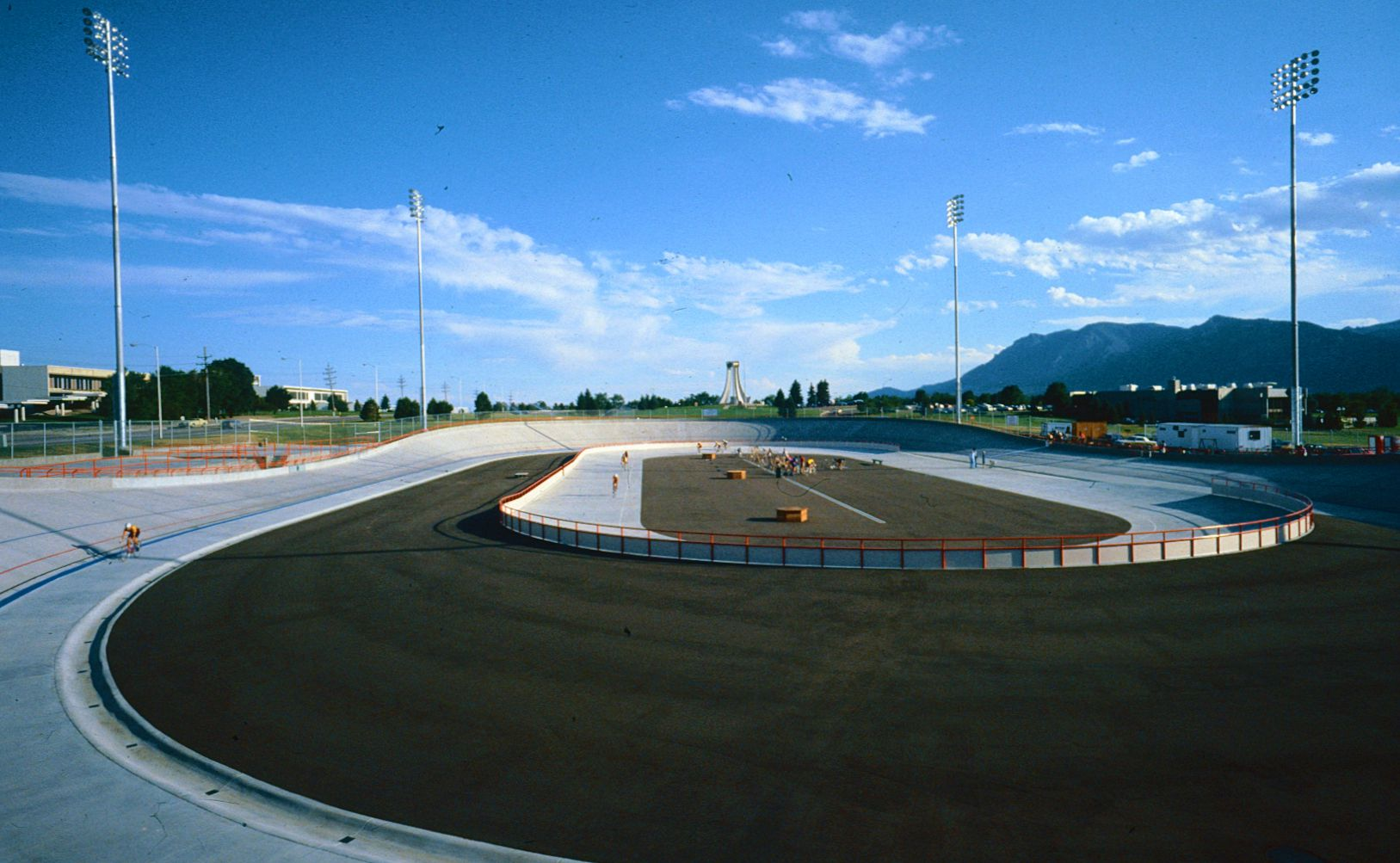
The OTC velodrome in Colorado Springs soon after it opened

The Olympic Training Center Velodrome, also known as the 7-11 Velodrome, is a velodrome in Colorado Springs, Colorado.

== Description ==
The track is surfaced with concrete, which is unusual as Olympic-quality tracks tend to be timber or synthetics. It was built in 1983, has a length of 333.333 m (364.537 yd) and is situated at an altitude of over 1850 m (6000 ft) above sea level.

== Events ==
In September 1984, the velodrome hosted the United States Cycling Federation Veteran's National Track Championships.

The velodrome was the site of the track competition of the World Cycling Championships in 1986. The competition took place from 27 August to 1 September that year and marked the fourth time the World Championships was held in the US.

In June 2014, a masters champion, Victor Williams, died after a crash during a race at the Velodrome.

Evelyn Stevens set the UCI women's hour record on the track in February 2016.

== See also ==
- List of cycling tracks and velodromes
