= Adelaide Super-Drome =

Velodrome in Gepps Cross, Australia

- Interactive map of Adelaide Super-Drome
- Location: State Sports Park, Main North Road, Gepps Cross, South Australia 5094
- Coordinates: 34°50′29″S 138°36′45″E
- Owner: South Australian Government
- Operator: Office for Recreation & Sport
- Capacity: 3,000
- Surface: softwood

Construction
- Groundbreaking: 1993
- Opened: 1993
- Architects: Carlo Gnezda (building); Ron Webb (track)

Tenants
- AIS Track Cycling (1993-present); Cycling South Australia

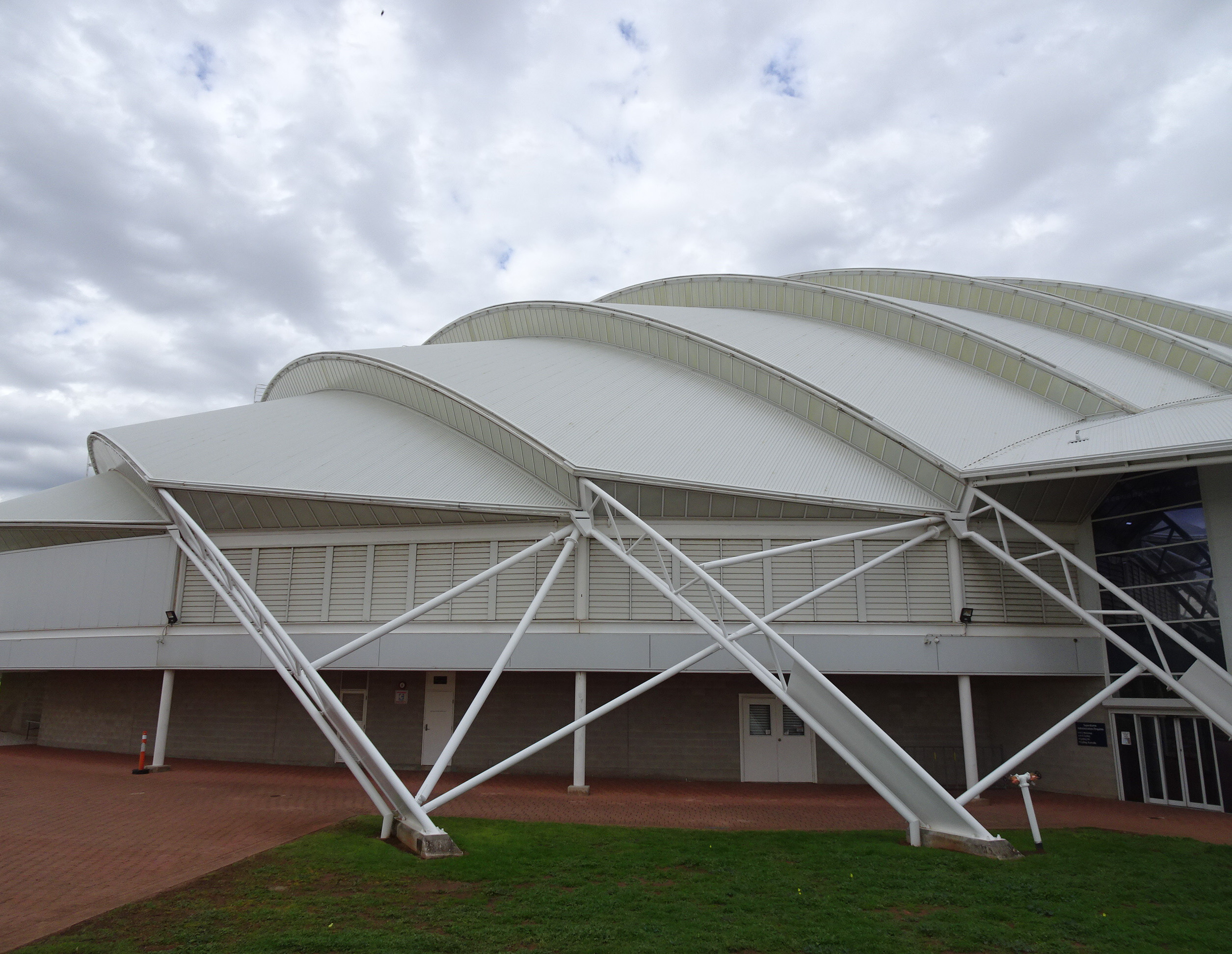
Adelaide Super-Drome pictured in 2021

The Adelaide Super-Drome is a velodrome located at Adelaide, South Australia's State Sports Park, Main North Road, Gepps Cross. The Super-Drome was designed by Architect Carlo Gnezda and was opened in 1993. From 1993 the venue was managed and promoted by 1984 Olympic Games Men's team pursuit gold medalist Michael Turtur. He was assisted by the venue's track designer Ron Webb in bringing out international competitors.

It is the headquarters for the Australian Institute of Sport’s Track Cycling Program due to its fully accredited international-standard training and competition facilities, for Adelaide's mild climate, and for being a short distance to the Adelaide Hills.

== Events and Usage ==
The Super-Drome has hosted international events and has been used as a training base for teams competing in Michael Turtur's Tour Down Under which is run annually in Adelaide and the surrounding countryside since 1999. The Super-Drome was also the site of the 2011 Oceania Track Championships.

The venue has been used by international track cycling teams as a training camp location prior to competitions in Adelaide and other Australian states.

On many weeknights the Super-Drome is the venue for the South Australian Futsal League, where all matches are played.

== Facilities ==
The indoor velodrome is a 250m international standard timber track made from specially specified Nordic Pine with 43° banking in the turns, constructed under the supervision of British velodrome specialist Ron Webb, while 3,000 spectators are accommodated in fixed tiered seating. On the upper level there is a large corporate function room with catering and bar facilities which has excellent views over the track. On this level there is a separate equipped media room.

In the centre of the cycling track is a multipurpose concrete floor used for various sports which once had a swimming pool set up on the tracks infield as part of a triathlon course.

It is the location for the headquarters and office of Cycling South Australia.

== See also ==
- List of cycling tracks and velodromes
