= Kawasaki, Kanagawa =

City in Kantō, Japan

Kawasaki 川崎市
- Designated city
- Kawasaki City
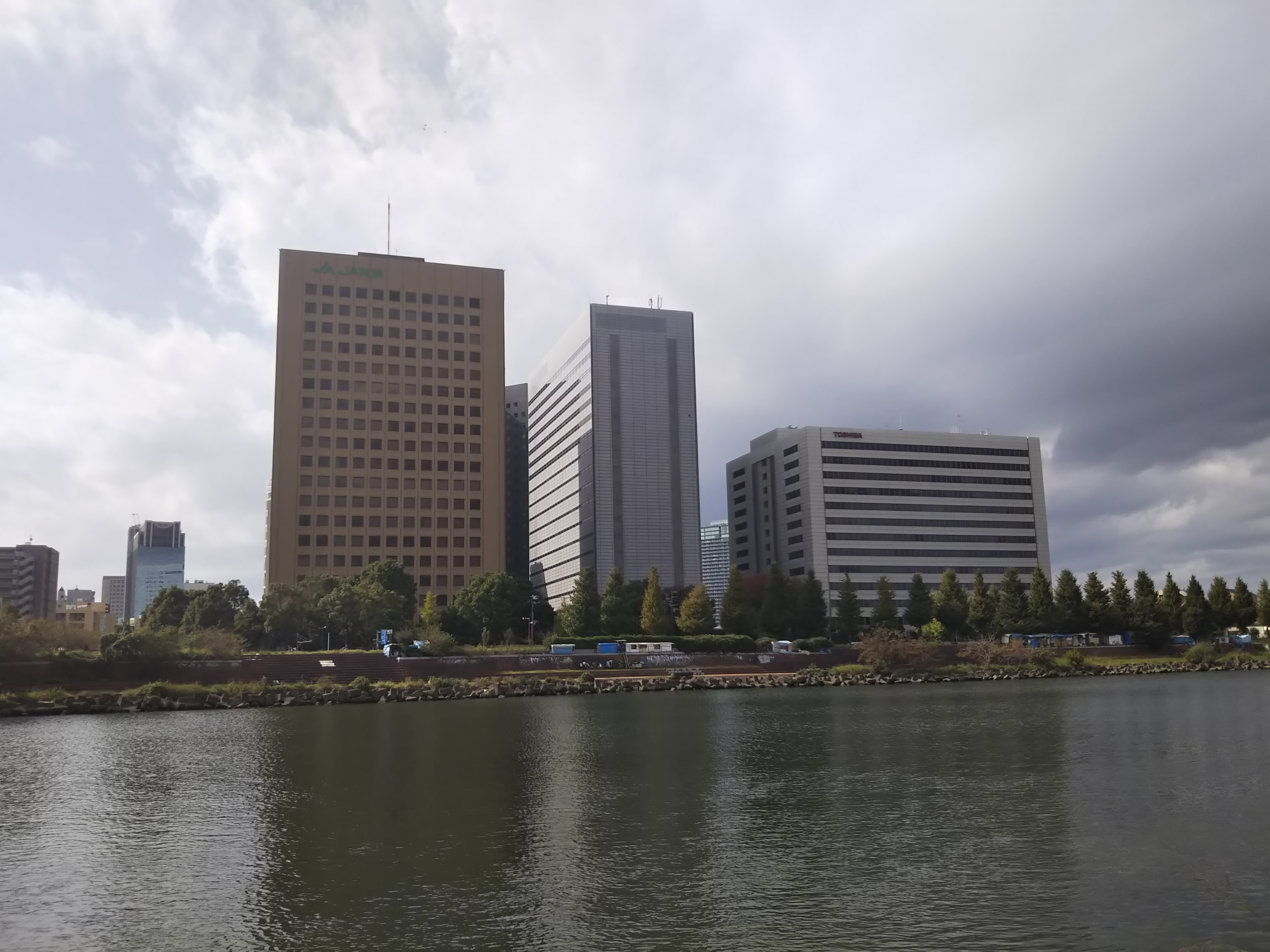
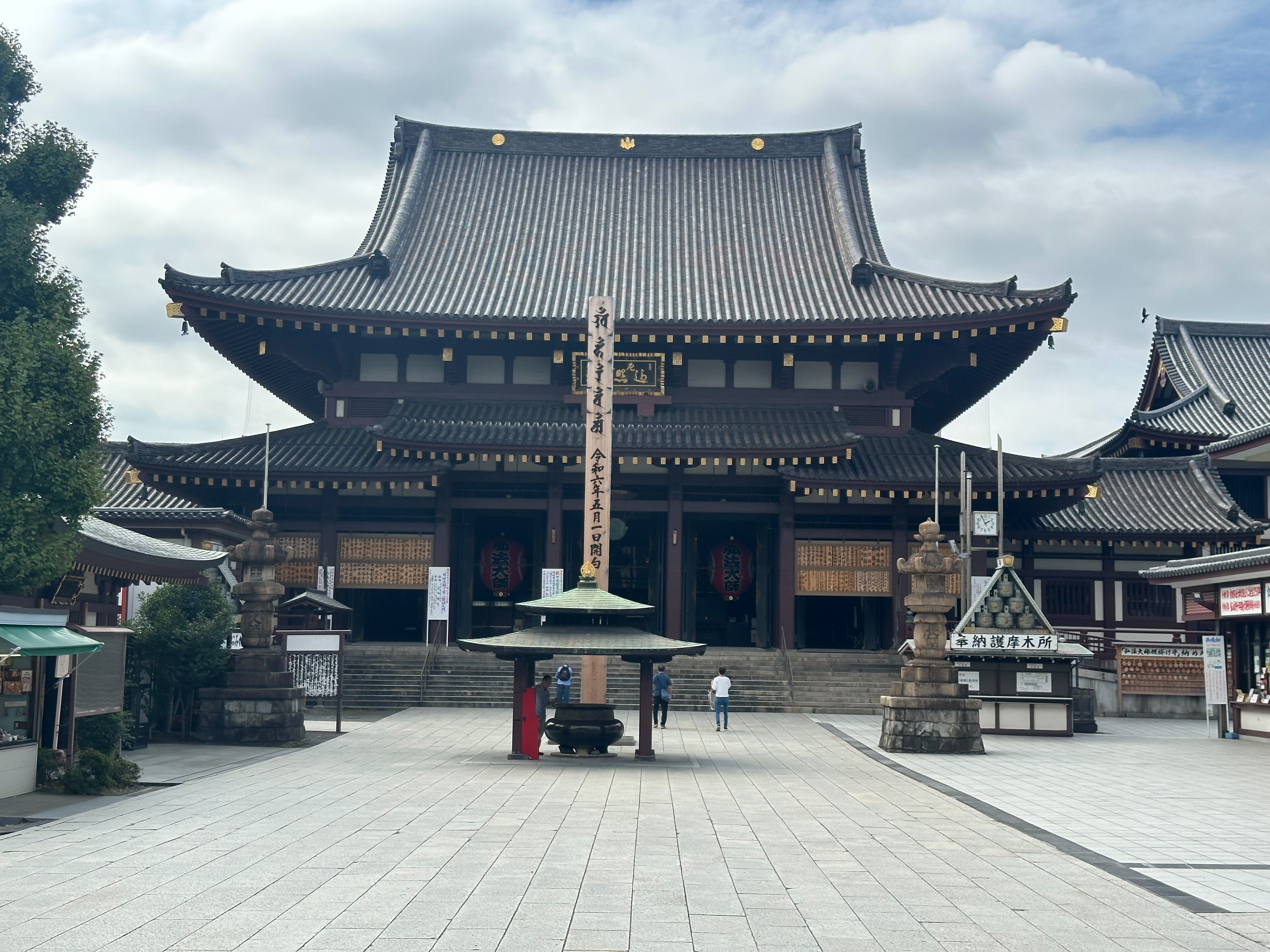
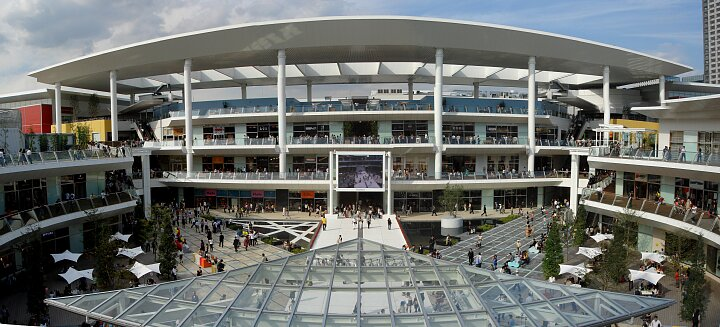
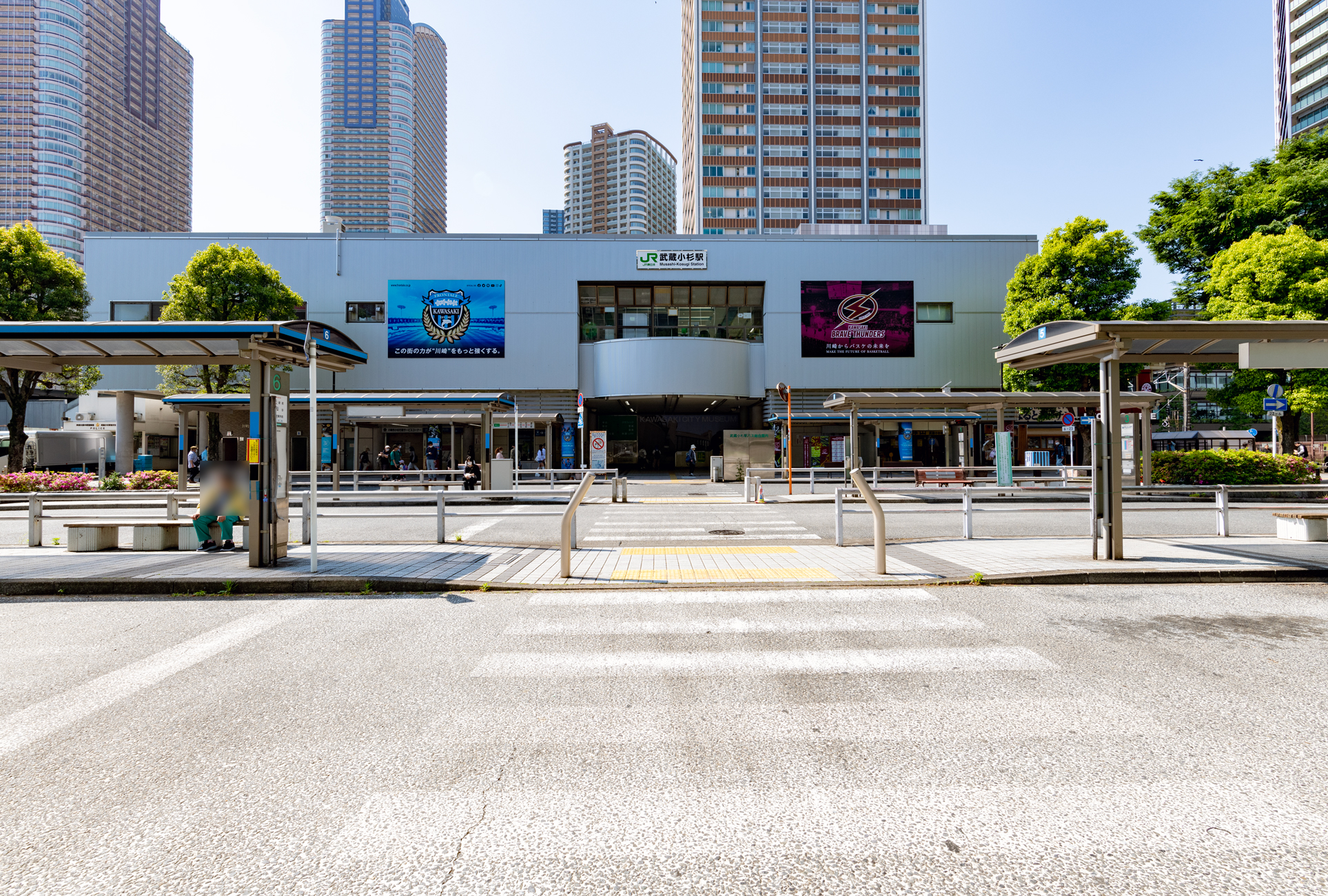
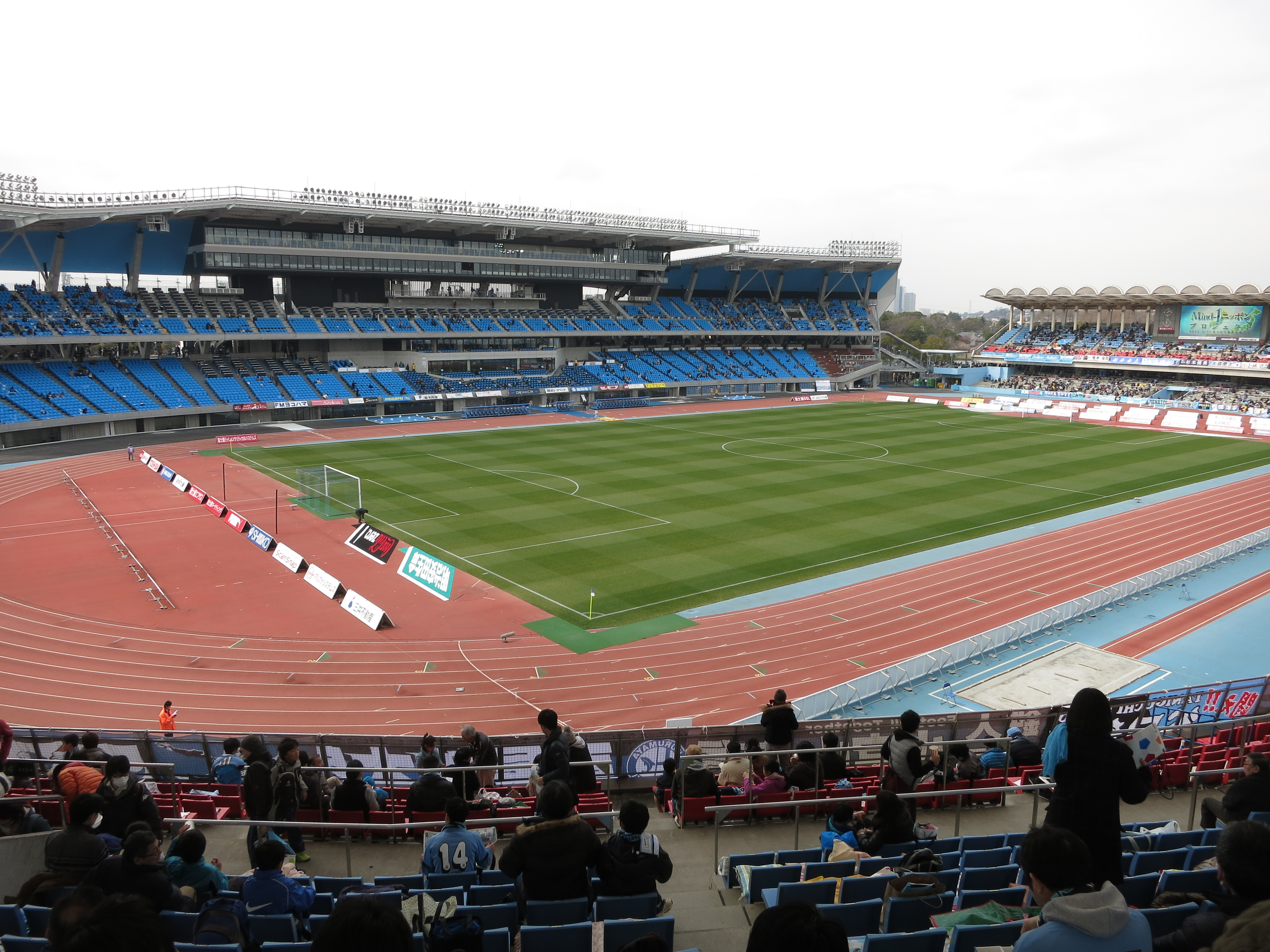
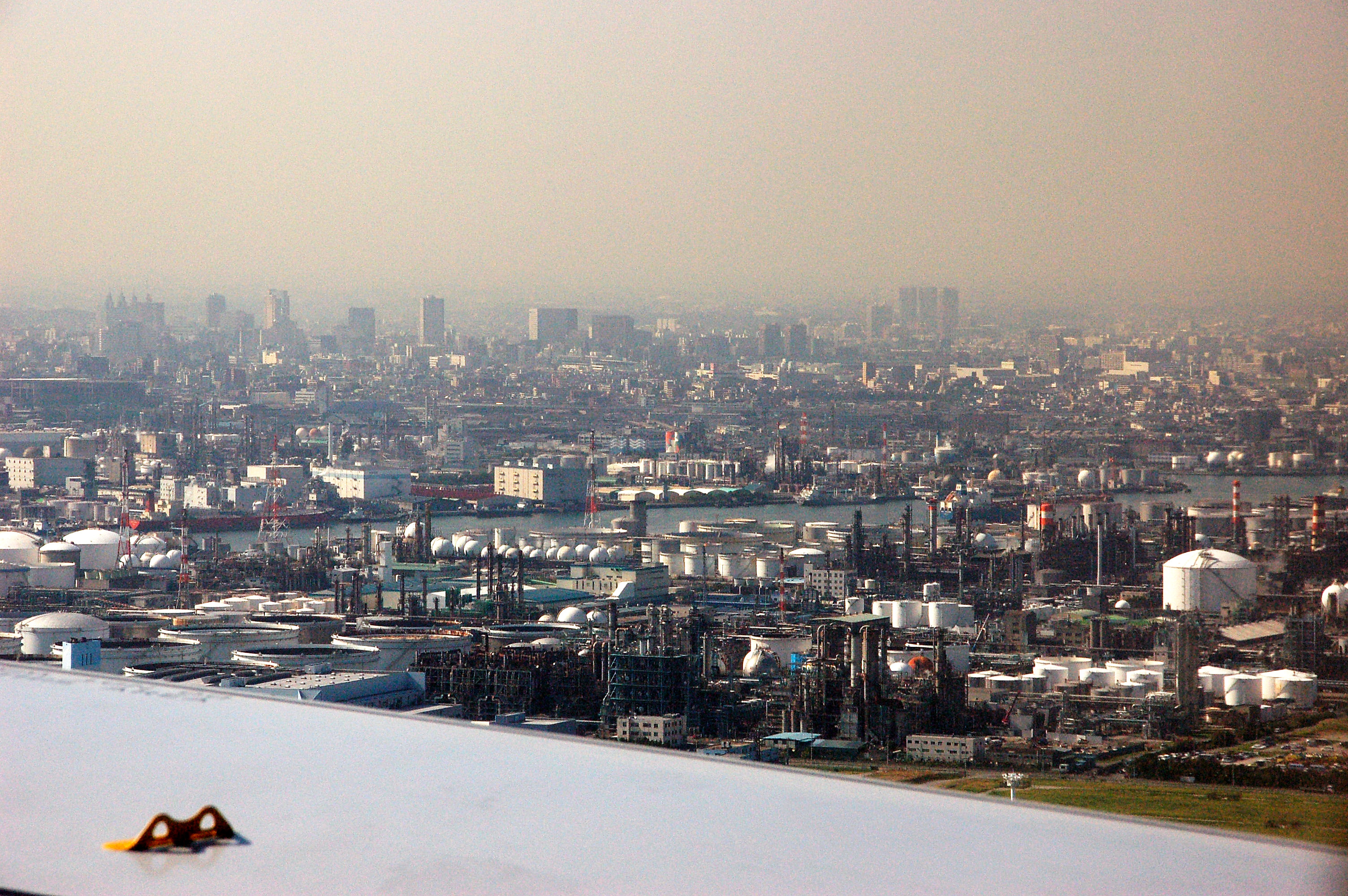
- Skyline of Downtown Kawasaki from the Tama River Kawasaki Daishi Lazona Kawasaki Plaza Musashi-Kosugi Area Todoroki Athletics Stadium Keihin industrial area

- Flag Seal
- Interactive map of Kawasaki
- Kawasaki (Kanto Area) Kawasaki (Kanagawa Prefecture)
- Coordinates: 35°31′N 139°42′E
- Country: Japan
- Region: Kantō
- Prefecture: Kanagawa Prefecture
- First official recorded: late 4th century
- City Settled: July 1, 1924

Government
  - Mayor: Norihiko Fukuda

Area
  - Total: 143.01 km^{2} (55.22 sq mi)

Population (January 1, 2020)
  - Total: 1,538,262
  - Density: 10,756/km^{2} (27,859/sq mi)
- Time zone: UTC+9 (Japan Standard Time)
- Tree: Camellia
- Flower: Azalea
- Phone number: 044-200-2111
- Address: 1 Miyamoto-chō, Kawasaki-ku, Kawasaki-shi, Kanagawa-ken 210-8577
- Website: www.city.kawasaki.jp

Kawasaki (Note: Japanese: 川崎; pronounced [kaɰasaki].), officially Kawasaki City (Note: Japanese: 川崎市, Hepburn: Kawasaki-shi), is a city in Kanagawa Prefecture, Japan, one of the main cities of the Greater Tokyo Area and Keihin Industrial Area. It is the second most populated city in Kanagawa Prefecture after Yokohama, and the eighth most populated city in Japan (including the Tokyo Metropolitan Area).

As of October 1, 2017, the city has an estimated population of 1,503,690, with 716,470 households, and a population density of 10,000 persons per km^{2}. Kawasaki is the only city in Japan with more than one million inhabitants that is not a prefectural capital. The total area is 142.70 km^{2} (55.10 sq mi).

== History ==
=== Prehistoric and ancient era ===
Archaeological evidence from the Japanese Paleolithic and Jōmon period can only be found in the northwest Tama Hills. The course of the Tama and the coast of the Bay of Tokyo have also changed in historical times, so that large parts of the urban area are geologically young.

=== Classical era ===
==== Nara period to the Sengoku period ====
With the introduction of the Ritsuryō legal system, the area came to the Musashi Province in the 7th century. In the Nara period, the center of the Tachibana district was probably in the area of today's Takatsu district. Since the Heian period, the domain of the Inage clan has expanded here. Around the Heiken-ji Buddhist temple (better known as Kawasaki-Daishi), founded in 1128, a monzen-machi, a busy district for the supply of pilgrims, soon emerged. Between the Kamakura period and Sengoku period, smaller feudal lords ruled the area until it finally came under the control of the Later Hōjō clan.

=== Early modern ===
In 1611, Koizumi Jidayū had Nikaryō Yōsui built, a canal system on the right bank of the Tama for irrigating the fields, which in some cases still runs through the densely built-up city. On the long-distance Kaidō roads Tōkaidō and Nakaharakaidō built by Edo-Bakufu, stations were built in the area of what would later become Kawasaki, which increased its importance. The Kawasaki station (Kawasaki-juku, near today's Kawasaki station) on the Tōkaidō was not officially recognized until 1623 as the last of the 53 Tōkaidō stations. The Bakufu let the bridges over the Tama collapse and there were ferry connections to nearby Edo in several places in today's Kawasaki, which laid the foundation for the development of the city.

Gallery

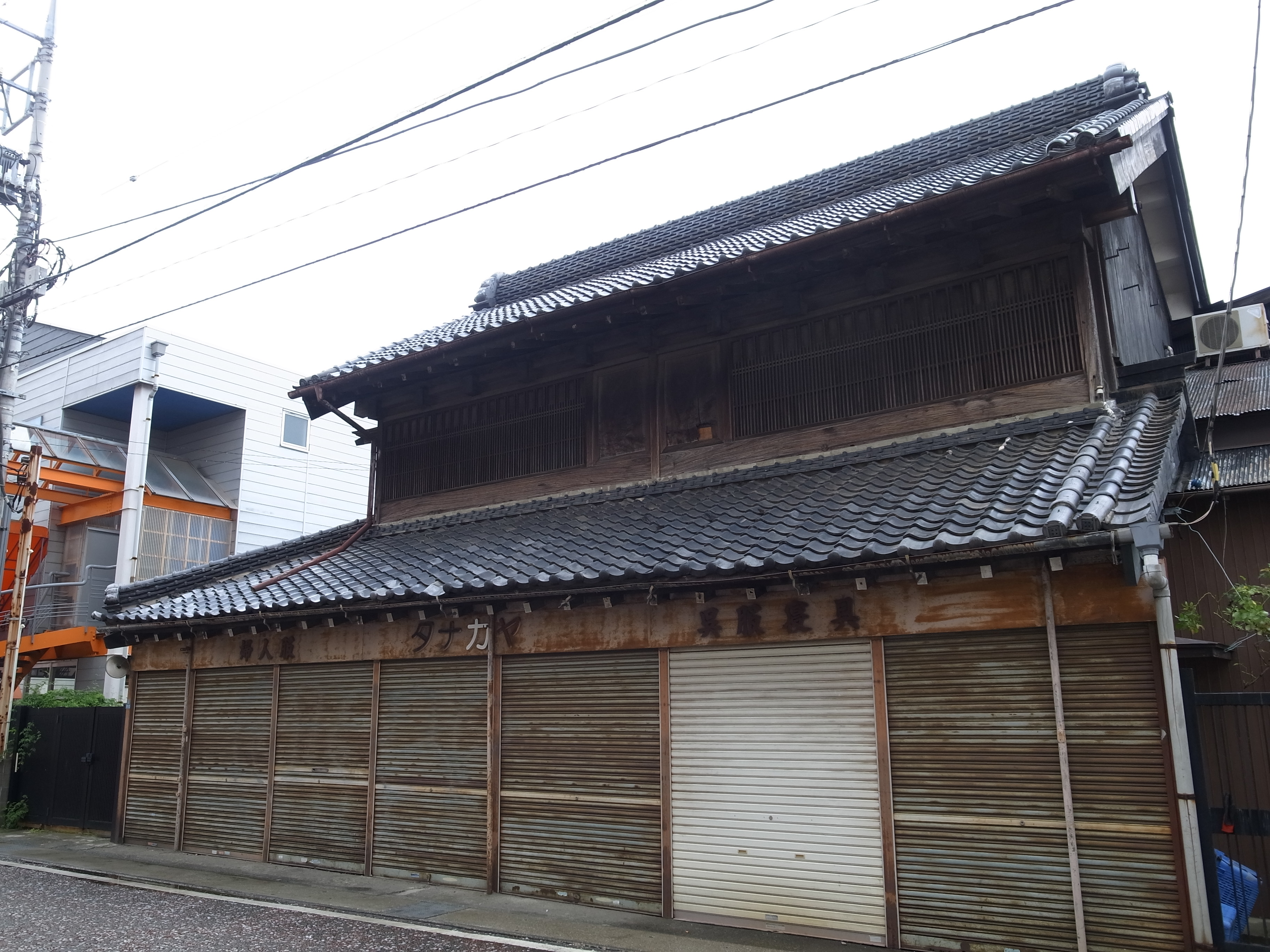
Old building in the "Kura-zukuri" style on Oyama Kaido street

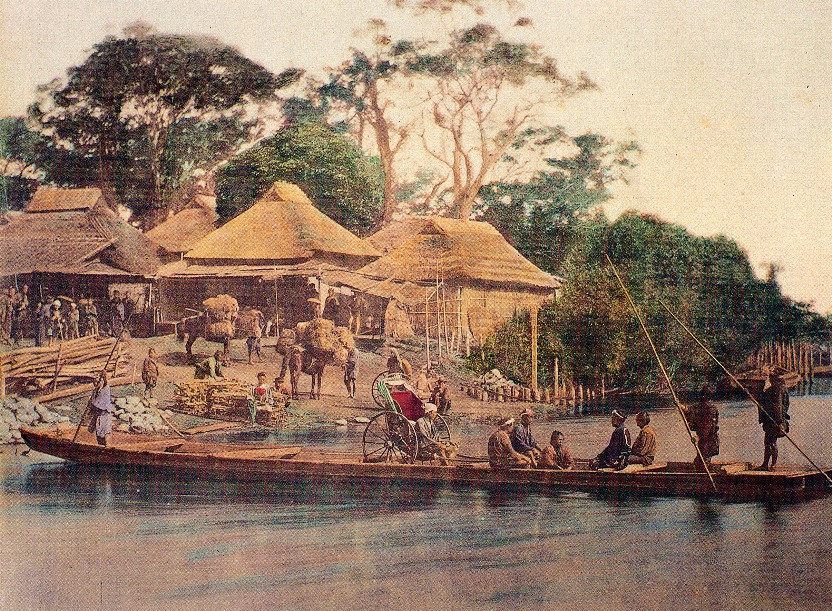
Rokugō no Watashi in the 1860s photographed by Felice Beato

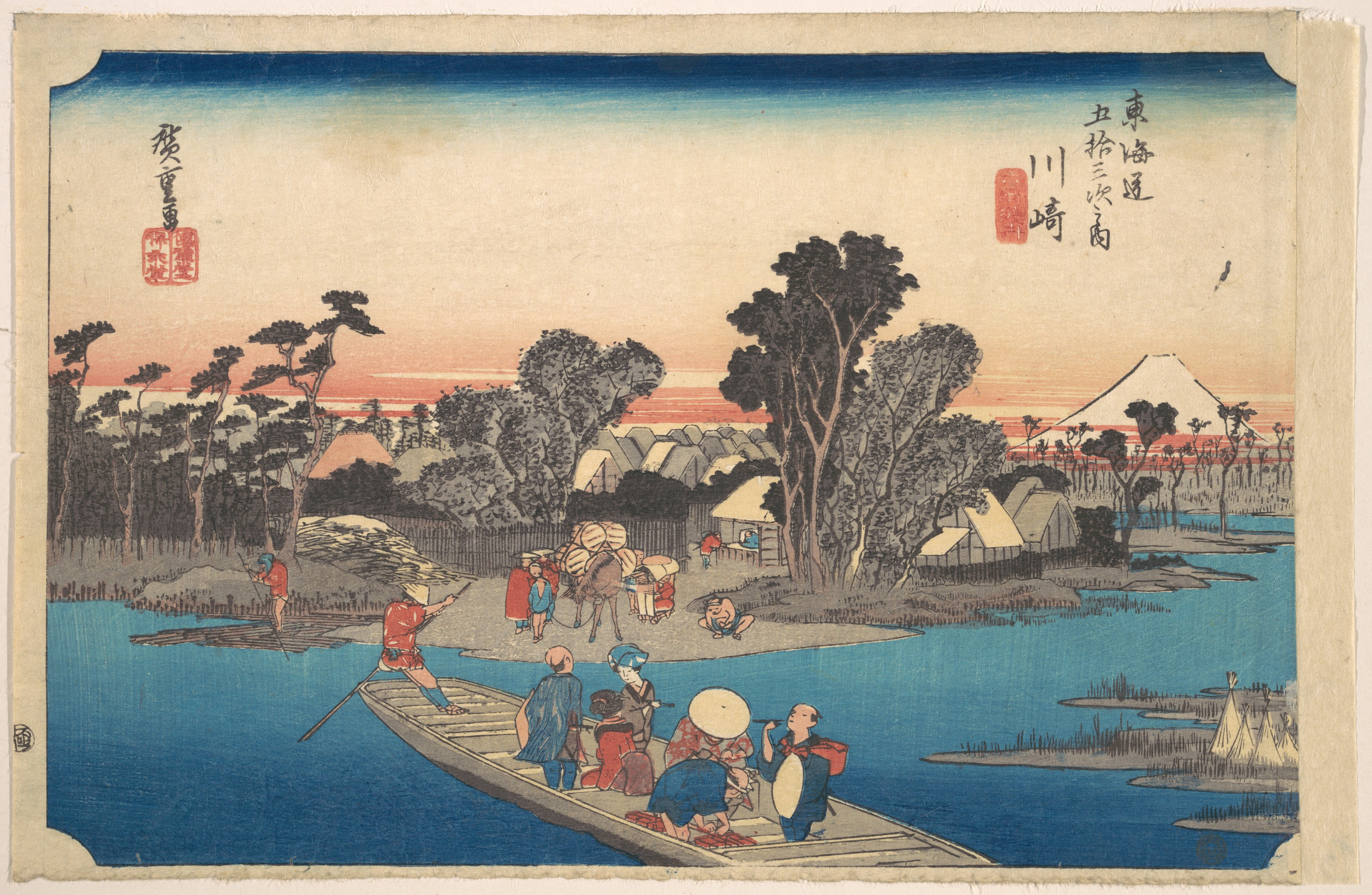
Ferry Boat Crossing the Rokugo River

=== Modern ===
The rapid urbanization of the area, which continues to this day, began in the Meiji and Taishō eras. In 1872, Kawasaki Station was established on the Tōkaidō Main Line which was Japan's first railway line. In 1889, the city (machi) Kawasaki in the district (gun) Tachibana was created according to the Japanese municipal system introduced the year before. In 1912 the border between Kanagawa and Tokyo prefectures was established as the Tama River. On July 1, 1924, the independent city (shi-) of Kawasaki with 48,394 inhabitants was formed through a merger with the city of Daishi (formerly Daishigawara) and the village of Miyuki.

People from the Korean peninsula were made to work in the industrial sector in the city, working on railways construction, or rebuilding roads damaged by U.S. bombings towards the end of WWII. People from Okinawa were also coming to the city, and in 1924, the oldest Okinawans Association in Japan was founded in Kawasaki.

==== World War II ====
As part of World War II, the city was bombed three times by the United States Army Air Forces (USAAF) between April 1945 and July 1945. The most serious attack was an area bombing with Napalm bombs on April 15, 1945. The attacks destroyed around 35% of the urban area and claimed 1,520 dead and 8,759 injured. The attacks burned down 9.3 km^{2} of the city (see Bombing of Tokyo). Kawasaki became a target of the first mainland bombing by the US military in 1942, followed by multiple bombings, partly due to the city's heavy and chemical industrial complex supplying the war efforts in Asia and the Pacific.

=== Contemporary period ===
==== Shōwa era (1945–1989) ====
On April 15, 1945, large parts of the area around the train station and the industrial area at the port were destroyed by air raids. Since the 1950s, residential areas for commuters have been created in the northeastern part of the city, which are connected directly to the centers of Tokyo by new railway lines. On April 1, 1972, Kawasaki became a decree-designated city (seirei shitei toshi) with 5 districts. In 1973 the population exceeded the million mark. In 1982 the new districts of Miyamae and Asao were created by splitting off from the districts of Takatsu and Tama. In the course of deindustrialization, industrial areas have recently been increasingly converted into residential areas (mostly Multi-family residential), so that a further increase in population density can be expected.

== Geography ==
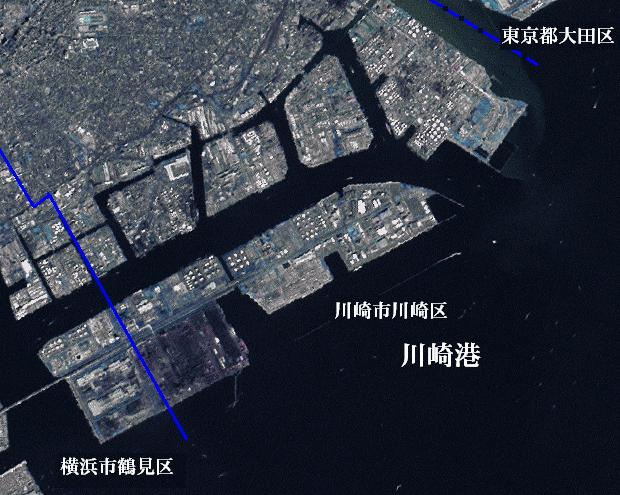
The Kawasaki port connects seamlessly with the neighboring ports Yokohama in the southwest and Tokyo in the northeast (2007).

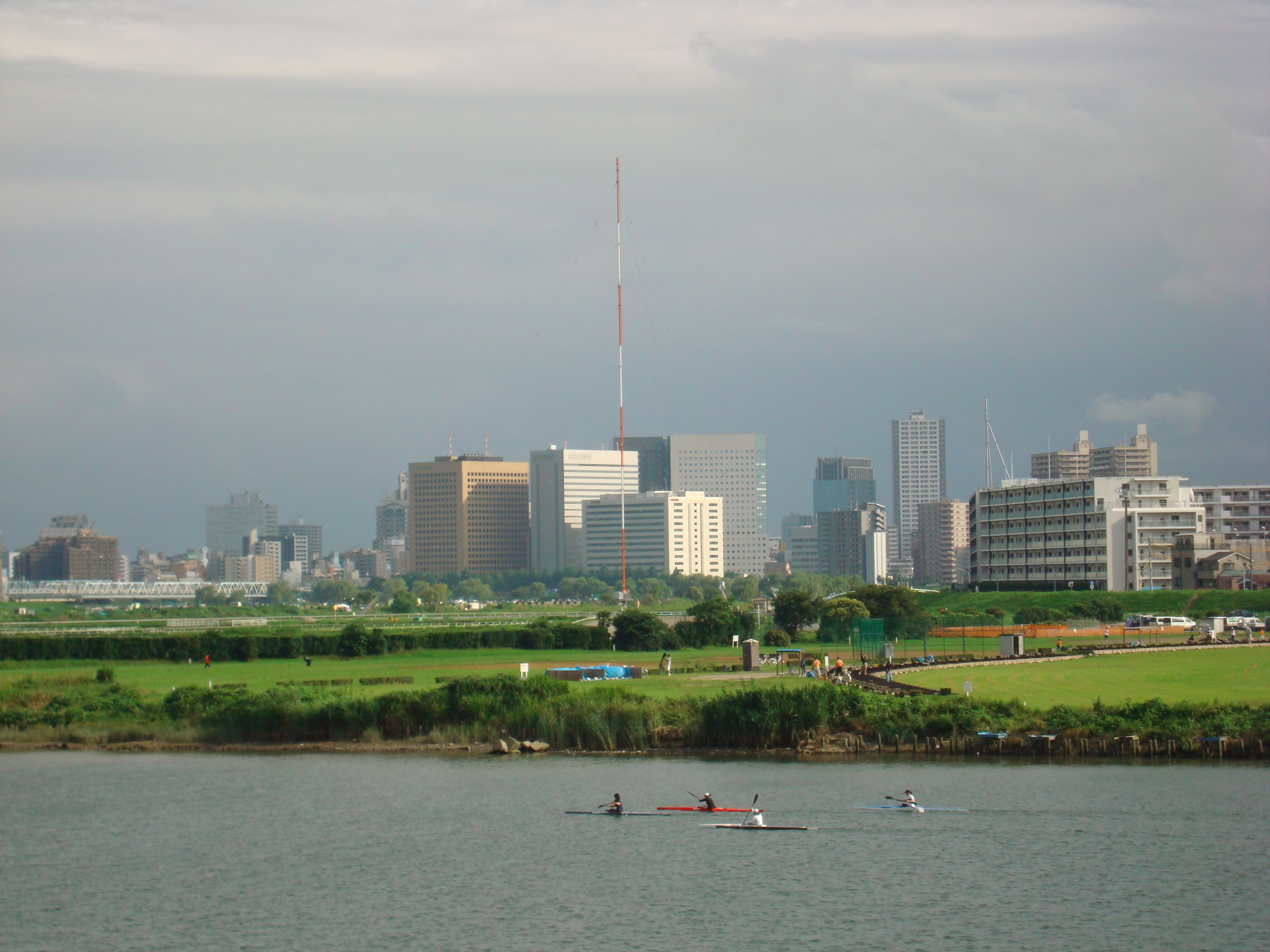
Downtown Kawasaki

=== Climate ===
According, to the Köppen Climate Classification, it is a humid subtropical climate (Cfa).

Climate data for Kawasaki (1991-2021 for everything apart from Sun Hours which is 1999-2019)
Month	Jan	Feb	Mar	Apr	May	Jun	Jul	Aug	Sep	Oct	Nov	Dec	Year
Mean daily maximum °C (°F)	8.7 (47.7)	9.4 (48.9)	12.6 (54.7)	16.9 (62.4)	21.2 (70.2)	24.1 (75.4)	27.7 (81.9)	29.0 (84.2)	26.0 (78.8)	20.8 (69.4)	15.8 (60.4)	11.1 (52.0)	18.6 (65.5)
Daily mean °C (°F)	4.8 (40.6)	5.5 (41.9)	8.8 (47.8)	13.6 (56.5)	18.1 (64.6)	21.4 (70.5)	25.1 (77.2)	26.3 (79.3)	23.3 (73.9)	17.9 (64.2)	12.6 (54.7)	7.5 (45.5)	15.4 (59.7)
Mean daily minimum °C (°F)	1.6 (34.9)	2.2 (36.0)	5.3 (41.5)	10.4 (50.7)	15.3 (59.5)	19.2 (66.6)	23.0 (73.4)	24.2 (75.6)	21.0 (69.8)	15.5 (59.9)	9.8 (49.6)	4.4 (39.9)	12.7 (54.8)
Average precipitation mm (inches)	75 (3.0)	79 (3.1)	125 (4.9)	117 (4.6)	132 (5.2)	165 (6.5)	137 (5.4)	112 (4.4)	189 (7.4)	206 (8.1)	106 (4.2)	65 (2.6)	1,508 (59.4)
Average precipitation days	5	7	9	8	9	10	9	9	10	9	7	5	97
Average relative humidity (%)	66	68	68	73	77	83	84	81	80	77	75	69	75
Mean daily sunshine hours	7.2	6.8	7.6	8.4	9.2	8.8	9.2	9.0	7.9	6.9	6.6	6.8	7.9

=== Location ===
Kawasaki is located on the right bank of the Tama River, which flows into the Tokyo Bay here. The city lies like a narrow band between Tokyo in the northeast and Yokohama in the southwest. The city connects the two major cities and is part of the Greater Tokyo Area, the largest and most densely populated urban area in the world.

The eastern area along the coast of Tokyo Bay is a densely populated industrial zone, part of the Keihin Industrial Zone. In contrast, the western districts in the Tama Hills consist largely of residential areas for commuters in the Tokyo / Yokohama region.

=== Wards ===
Kawasaki has seven wards (ku):

Wards of Kawasaki
	Name		Color	Map of Kawasaki
	Rōmaji	Kanji	Color	Map of Kawasaki
1	Asao-ku	麻生区	Leaf green	Map of the wards in Kawasaki.
2	Kawasaki-ku (administrative center)	川崎区	Lime green	Map of the wards in Kawasaki.
3	Miyamae-ku	宮前区	Orange	Map of the wards in Kawasaki.
4	Nakahara-ku	中原区	Blue	Map of the wards in Kawasaki.
5	Saiwai-ku	幸区	Teal	Map of the wards in Kawasaki.
6	Takatsu-ku	高津区	Purple	Map of the wards in Kawasaki.
7	Tama-ku	多摩区	Pink	Map of the wards in Kawasaki.

=== Adjacent cities and towns ===
In the northeast, Kawasaki borders the Special wards of Tokyo (starting at Tokyo Bay) Ōta and Setagaya, in the northwest the cities (-shi) belonging to Tokyo Prefecture (-shi) Komae, Chofu, Machida, Inagi, Tama enclose the place. The opposite southwest side is entirely occupied by the districts of Tsurumi, Kōhoku, Tsuzuki and Aoba in the city of Yokohama. With the completion of the Tokyo Bay Aqua-Line, the city of Kisarazu, located on the opposite side of the Tokyo Bay in Chiba Prefecture, also became a neighbor in December 1997.

=== Bodies of water ===
Two rivers cross the urban area. The Tama unites with the tributaries Misawa, Yamashita, Gotanda, Nikaryō main river and Hirase; Katahira, Asao, Shimpukuji, Arima, E, Shibu and Yagami flow into the Tsurumi.

The land on the coast of the city is crossed by a network of canals (Tama Canal, Suehiro Canal, Chidori Canal, Yakō Canal, Daishi Canal, Mizue Canal, Shiohama Canal, Iriesaki Canal, Asano Canal, Ikegami Canal, Minami-Watarida Canal, Tanabe Canal, Shiraishi Canal and the Sakai Canal). In addition, the historic Nikaryō Yōsui canal still exists in the hinterland.

== Demographics ==
Per Japanese census data, the population of Kawasaki has seen sustained growth over the past 70 years.

Historical population
Year	Pop.	±%
1940	300,777	—
1945	252,923	−15.9%
1950	319,226	+26.2%
1960	445,520	+39.6%
1965	632,975	+42.1%
1970	854,866	+35.1%
1975	973,497	+13.9%
1980	1,014,951	+4.3%
1985	1,088,624	+7.3%
1990	1,173,603	+7.8%
1995	1,202,820	+2.5%
2000	1,249,905	+3.9%
2005	1,327,011	+6.2%
2010	1,425,678	+7.4%
2015	1,475,213	+3.5%
2020	1,538,262	+4.3%

== Politics and government ==
Kawasaki is governed by Mayor Norihiko Fukuda, an independent elected on 27 October 2013. The city assembly has 63 elected members. Mayor Fukuda was re-elected to a second term in office on 22 October 2017 with support from LDP and Kōmeitō against former municipal MP Akiko Yoshizawa and JCP-supported former primary school teacher Hirokazu Ichiko.

The 60-member city parliament of Kawasaki was re-elected in the unified elections in April 2023. The LDP won 17 seats and is the largest party in the assembly.

Kawasaki was in June 2008 the second Japanese "government-designated city" (seirei shitei toshi) after Hiroshima, which allowed foreigners to participate in municipal referendums.

In the 105-member prefectural parliament of Kanagawa, the seven districts of Kawasaki serve as constituencies, electing 18 deputies in total.

For the House of Representatives (Japan), Kawasaki comprises the constituencies Kanagawa 9th (Tama and Asao wards), 10th (Kawasaki and Saiwai wards), 18th (Nakahara and Takatsu wards) and 19th (Miyamae ward, with Tsuzuki ward, Yokohama), following changes since the last general election in 2021. In the 2021 election, the three seats went unchanged to Liberal Democrats Kazunori Tanaka and Daishirō Yamagiwa, and ex-Democrat Hirofumi Ryū of the Constitutional Democratic Party.

=== Elections ===
- 2005 Kawasaki mayoral election

=== List of mayors of Kawasaki (from 1924) ===
#	Name	Entered office	Left office
1	Taisuke Ishii (石井泰助)	October 18, 1924	March 2, 1929
2	Kahei Shundo (春藤嘉平)	March 11, 1929	November 11, 1930
3	Fumisuke Kudara (百済文輔)	August 22, 1931	June 27, 1932
4	Shigeharu Nakaya (中屋重治)	August 13, 1932	March 27, 1935
5	Ichiro Shibatsuji (芝辻一郎)	September 14, 1935	September 13, 1939
6	Hachiro Murai (村井八郎)	May 13, 1940	May 12, 1944
7	Kiyoo Ebe (江辺清夫)	May 23, 1944	June 10, 1946
8-14	Fujitaro Kanasashi (金刺不二太郎)	August 1, 1946	April 29, 1971
15-19	Saburo Itoh (伊藤三郎)	April 30, 1971	October 18, 1989
20-22	Kiyoshi Takahashi (高橋清)	November 20, 1989	November 18, 2001
23-25	Takao Abe (阿部孝夫)	November 19, 2001	November 18, 2013
26-27	Norihiko Fukuda (福田紀彦)	November 19, 2013	Present

== Sports ==
=== Facilities ===
==== Baseball ====
- Kawasaki Stadium: Located in Kawasaki-ku. Opened in 1952, and was used as a home field for professional baseball teams Takahashi Unions, Taiyo Whales, Lotte Orions, from 1954 to 1991. The stands were taken down in 2001, and is currently used for American football games and other events in addition to baseball.
- Kawasaki Todoroki Baseball Stadium: Located in Nakahara-ku. Maximum capacity of 5,000 people. Used for preliminary rounds of high school baseball and American football games.

==== Field athletics & football ====
- Todoroki Athletics Stadium: Located in Nakahara-ku. Maximum capacity of 25,000 people. Opened in 1964, the stadium underwent several renovations before becoming the home field for the Kawasaki Frontale. Also used frequently for track & field competitions.

==== Indoor facilities ====
- Kawasaki Prefectural Gymnasium: Located in Kawasaki-ku. Opened in 1956, and is used for Puroresu matches. 20 minutes walking distance from Kawasaki Station's east entrance.
- Kawasaki Todoroki Arena: Located in Nakahara-ku. International field athletics and volleyball matches are held here, in addition to various musical concerts, and becoming the home for the Kawasaki Brave Thunders.

==== Cycling & horseracing ====
- Velodrome: Kawasaki Velodrome
- Kawasaki Keiba

== Economy ==
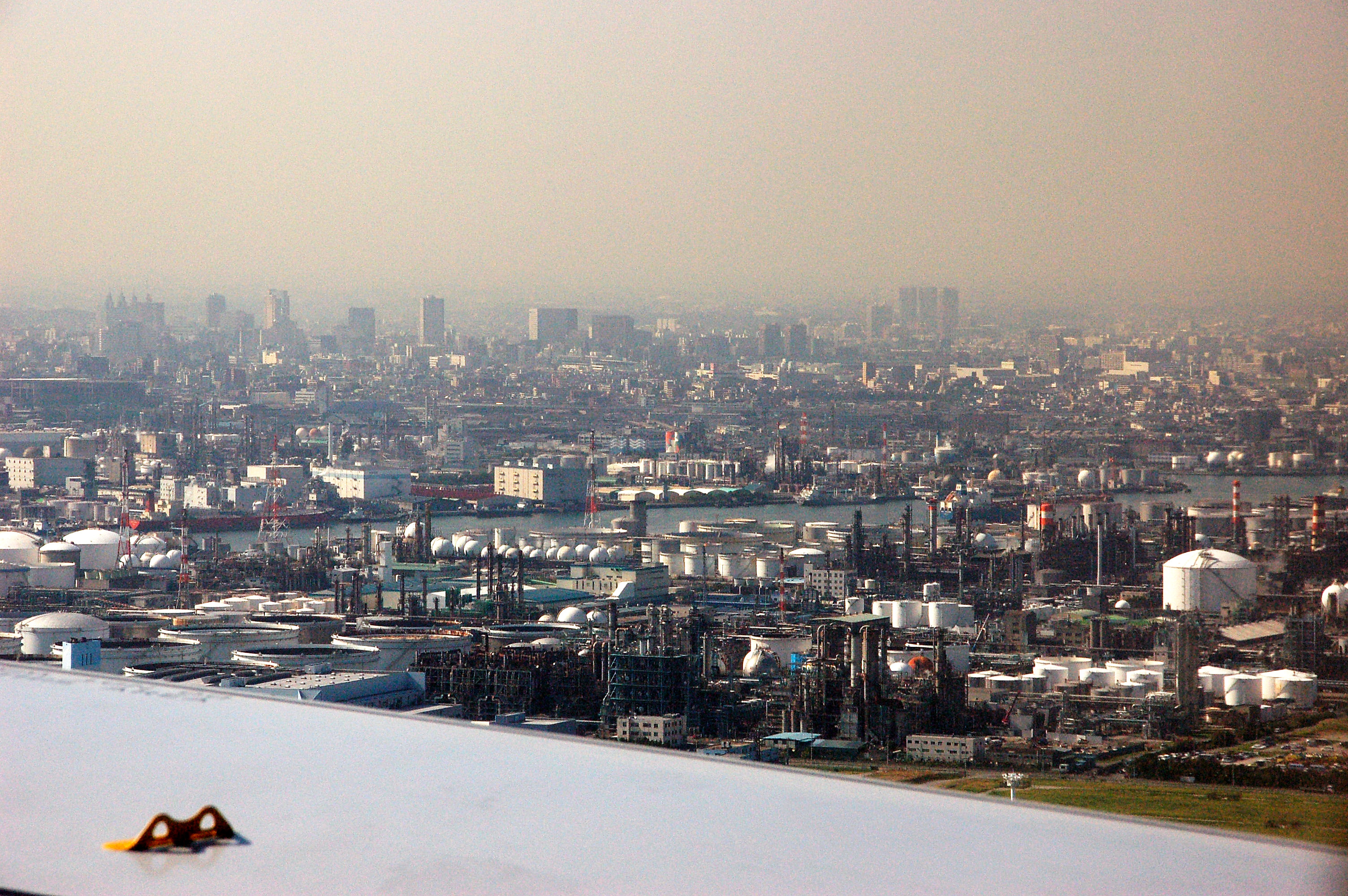
Keihin industrial Zone (Kawasaki)

Kawasaki, particularly its eastern portion, has several factories and development bases of heavy industry (e.g., JFE Group, ENEOS) and high technology (e.g., Fujitsu, NEC, Toshiba, Dell Japan and Sigma). Many of these factories are built on reclaimed land near Tokyo Bay, taking advantage of access to the sea as well as regional rail and highway networks and the nearby Haneda Airport.

The areas around Kawasaki Station, Musashi-Kosugi Station, Mizonokuchi Station and Shin-Yurigaoka Station are major commercial districts, housing numerous corporate offices and shopping centers.

Fujitsu's Main Branch is located in Nakahara-ku. It was formerly Fujitsu's headquarters.

== Culture and sights ==
=== Temples and shrines ===
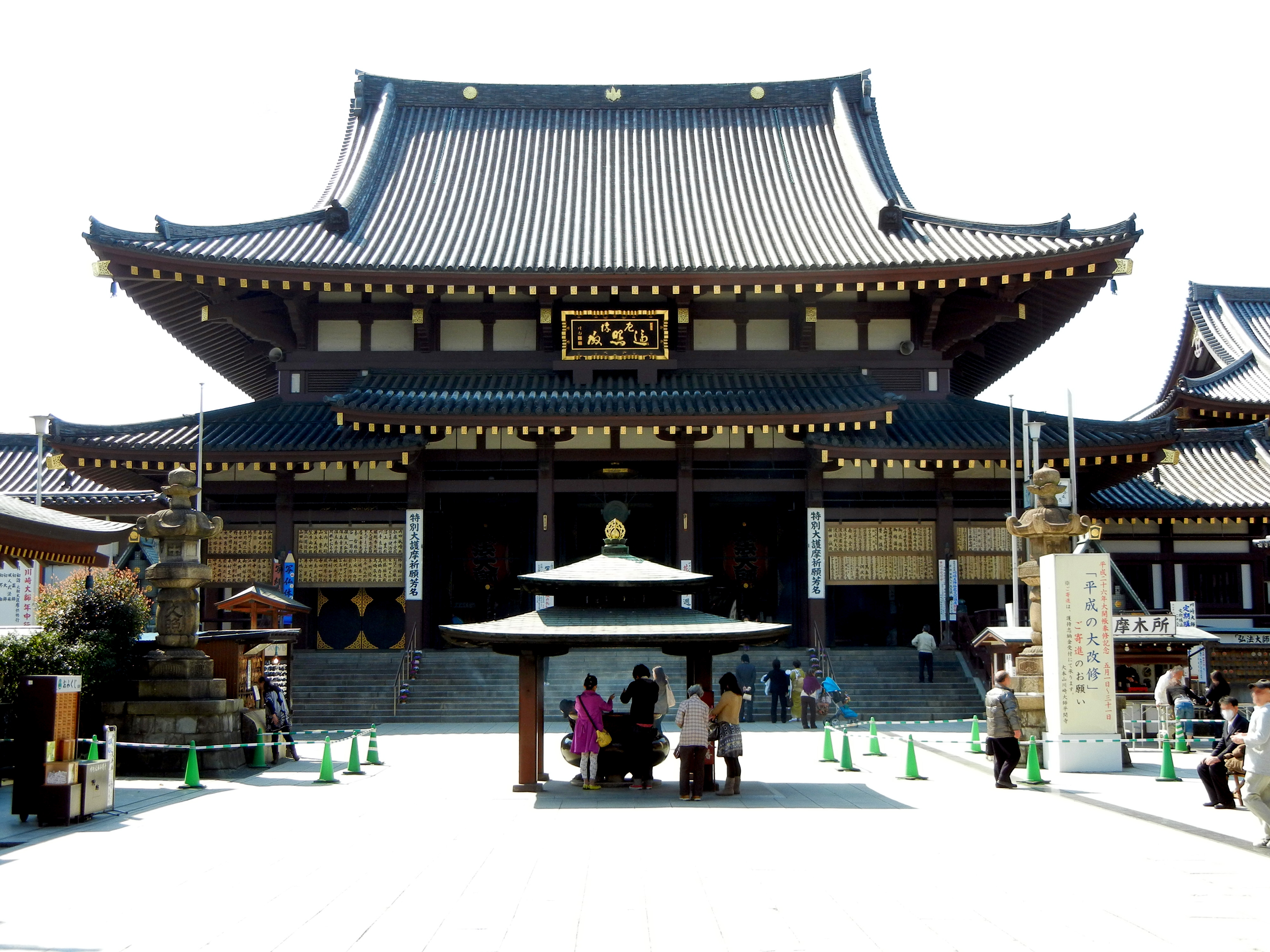
The Heiken-ji is a Buddhist temple in Kawasaki, better known as Kawasaki-daishi (川 崎 大師).

- Jōraku Temple (Jōraku-ji)
- Kanayama Shrine: Site of the annual Kanamara Matsuri (Festival Of The Steel Phallus).
- Kawasaki Daishi (Heiken-ji). A Buddhist temple in the Kawasaki district. It is the second most visited temple in the Kantō region
- Kotohira Shrine (Kotohira-jinja)
- Mikawari Fudō shrine
- Shinkō Temple (Shinkō-ji) in the spring and autumn garden (Shunjū-en)
- Takaishi Shrine (Takaishi-jinja)
- Tenshōkō daijin shrine (Tenshōkō daijin)

=== Museums and galleries ===
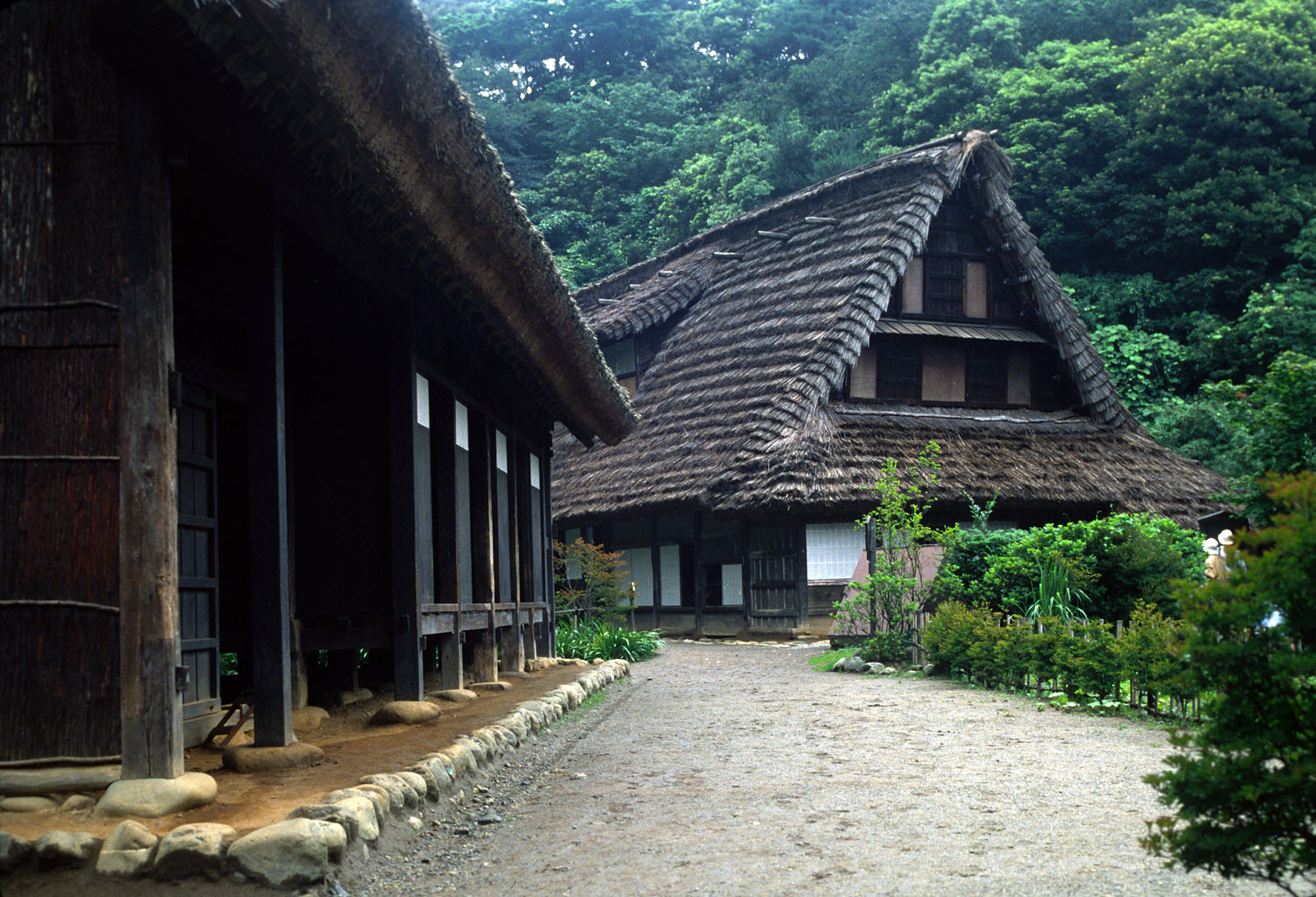
Nihon Minka-en Open Air Museum (Tama District)

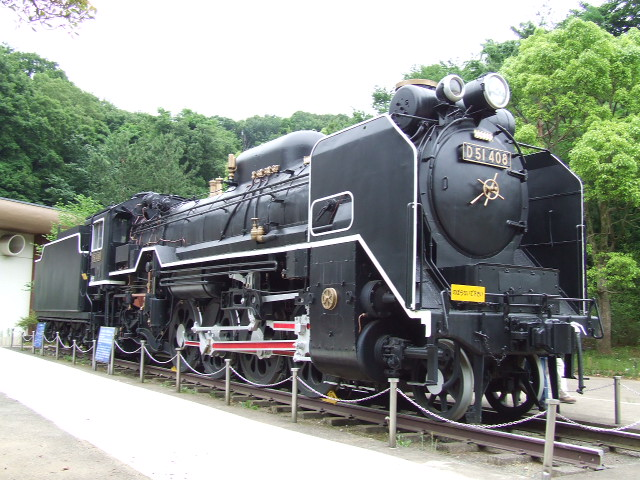
State Railroad D51 steam locomotive in Ikuta Ryokuchi

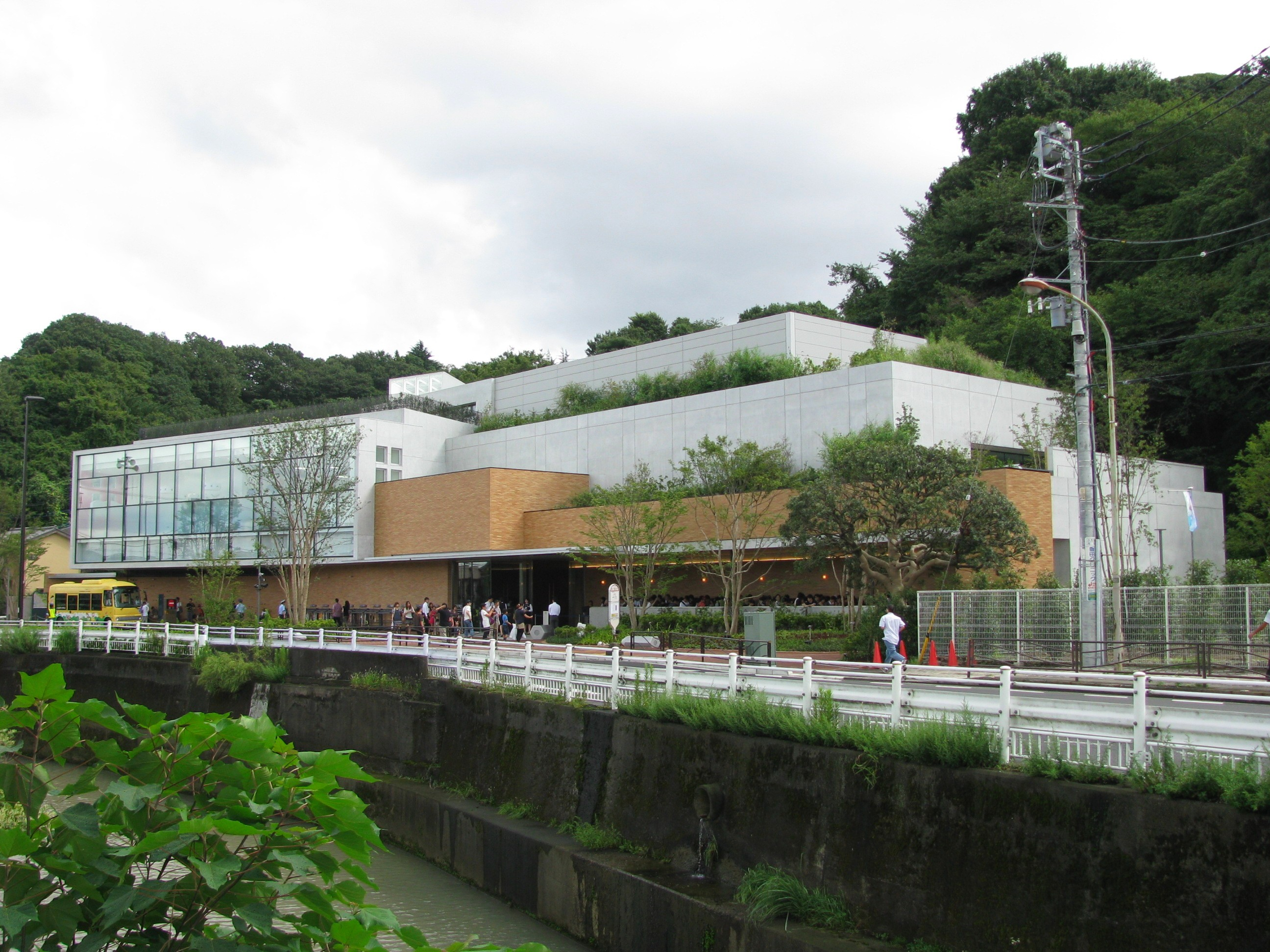
The Fujiko･F･Fujio Museum

- Fujiko F. Fujio Museum: also known as Doraemon museum, opened on September 3, 2011, in Tama-ku Ward.
- Kawasaki City Museum
- Nihon Minka-en Open Air Museum (Tama District): with minka traditional farmhouses from different regions of Japan.
- Taro Okamoto Museum of Art
- Railway and bus museum
- Toshiba Museum

=== Music ===
- CLUB CITTA
- Muza Kawasaki Symphony Hall - home of the Tokyo Symphony Orchestra
- Yomiuri-Land EAST (Open Air Music Theater)

=== Recreational facilities ===
- Kawasaki Racecourse
- Keirin cycle track Kawasaki
- Kawasaki Marien (leisure center)
- Yomiuri Land

=== Parks ===
- Ikuta green space (Ikuta ryokuchi)
- Todoroki Ryokuchi: athletic park
- Yumemigasaki Zoo (Yumemigasaki dōbutsu kōen)

=== Regular events ===
- Daruma market in Shimo-Asao
- In Unity
- Kanamara Matsuri
- Kawasaki Citizens' Festival
- Kawasaki fantasy night
- Kawasaki Robot Congress
- Sannō festival at the Inage shrine
- Shin-Yuri art festival
- Tamagawa fireworks display

=== Places of interest ===
- Kawasaki Warehouse: An amusement arcade whose aesthetic is inspired by the Kowloon Walled City.
- Koreatown: eastern Kawasaki has the second largest concentration of Koreans in Japan, after Osaka. In 1997 it became the first municipality to allow non-Japanese nationals to take civil service employment.
- Nakagawa stable: stable of professional sumo wrestler

== Transportation ==
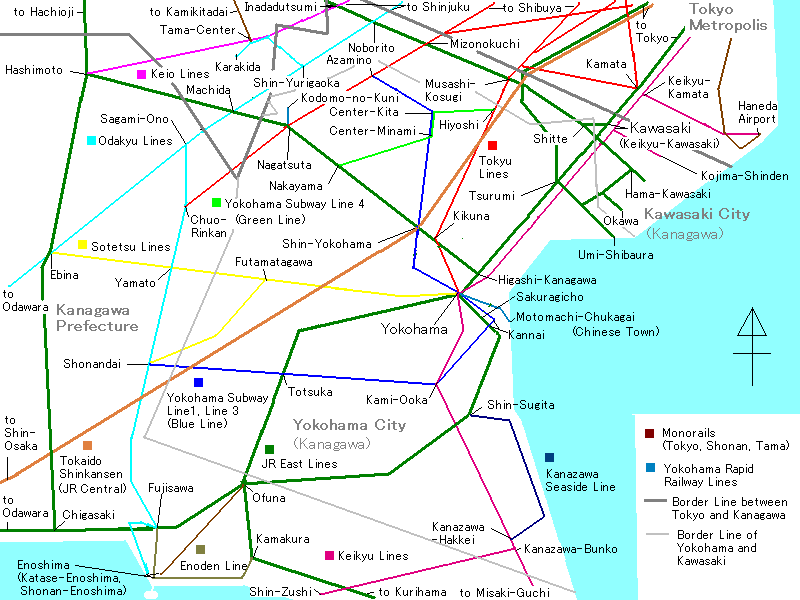
The railway network around Kawasaki (northeast area in this map)

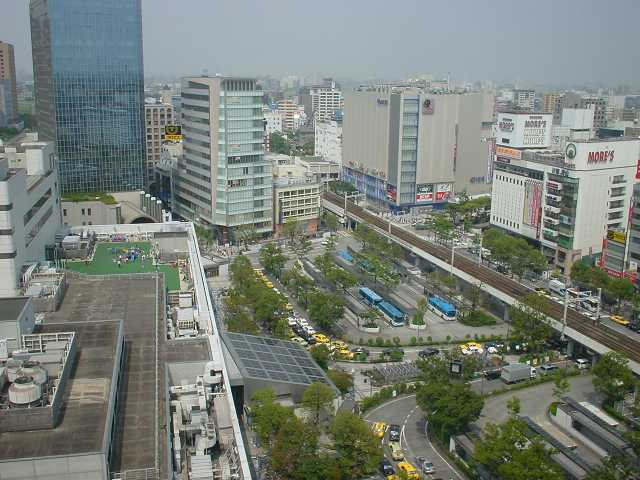
The area around Kawasaki Station

=== Railway stations ===
■ East Japan Railway Company
■ Tōkaidō Main Line
- - Kawasaki -
■ Keihin-Tōhoku Line
- - Kawasaki -
■ Nambu Line
- Main Line : Kawasaki - Shitte - Yakō (Yakō Station is in Tsurumi-ku, Yokohama) - Kashimada - Hirama - Mukaigawara - Musashi-Kosugi - Musashi-Nakahara - Musashi-Shinjō - Musashi-Mizonokuchi - Tsudayama - Kuji - Shukugawara - Noborito - Nakanoshima - Inadazutsumi -
- Branch Line : Shitte - Hatchōnawate - Kawasaki-Shinmachi - Hama-Kawasaki
■ Tsurumi Line
- Main Line : - Musashi-Shiraishi - Hama-Kawasaki - Shōwa - Ōgimachi
- Ōkawa Branch : - Ōkawa
■ Yokosuka Line, Shōnan-Shinjuku Line
- - Musashi-Kosugi - Shin-Kawasaki -
■ Odakyu Electric Railway
■ Odakyū Line
- - Noborito - Mukōgaoka-Yūen - Ikuta - Yomiuri-Land-mae - Yurigaoka - Shin-Yurigaoka - Kakio
■ Tama Line
- Shin-Yurigaoka - Satsukidai - Kurihira - Kurokawa - Haruhino -
■ Keio Corporation
■ Sagamihara Line
- - Keiō-Inadazutsumi - Keiō-Yomiuri-Land - Inagi (Keiō-Yomiuri-Land Station and Inagi Station are in Inagi, Tokyo.) - Wakabadai
■ Keikyu Corporation
■ Keikyū Main Line
- - Hatchōnawate - Keikyū Kawasaki -
■ Daishi Line
- Keikyū Kawasaki - Minatochō - Suzukichō - Kawasaki-Daishi - Higashi-Monzen - Daishibashi - Kojimashinden
■ Tokyu Corporation
■ Tōyoko Line
- - Shin-Maruko - Musashi-Kosugi - Motosumiyoshi -
■ Meguro Line
- - Shin-Maruko - Musashi-Kosugi - Motosumiyoshi -
■ Den-en-toshi Line
- - Futako-Shinchi - Takatsu - Mizonokuchi - Kajigaya - Miyazakidai - Miyamaedaira - Saginuma -
■ Ōimachi Line
- - Futako-Shinchi - Takatsu - Mizonokuchi

=== Highways ===
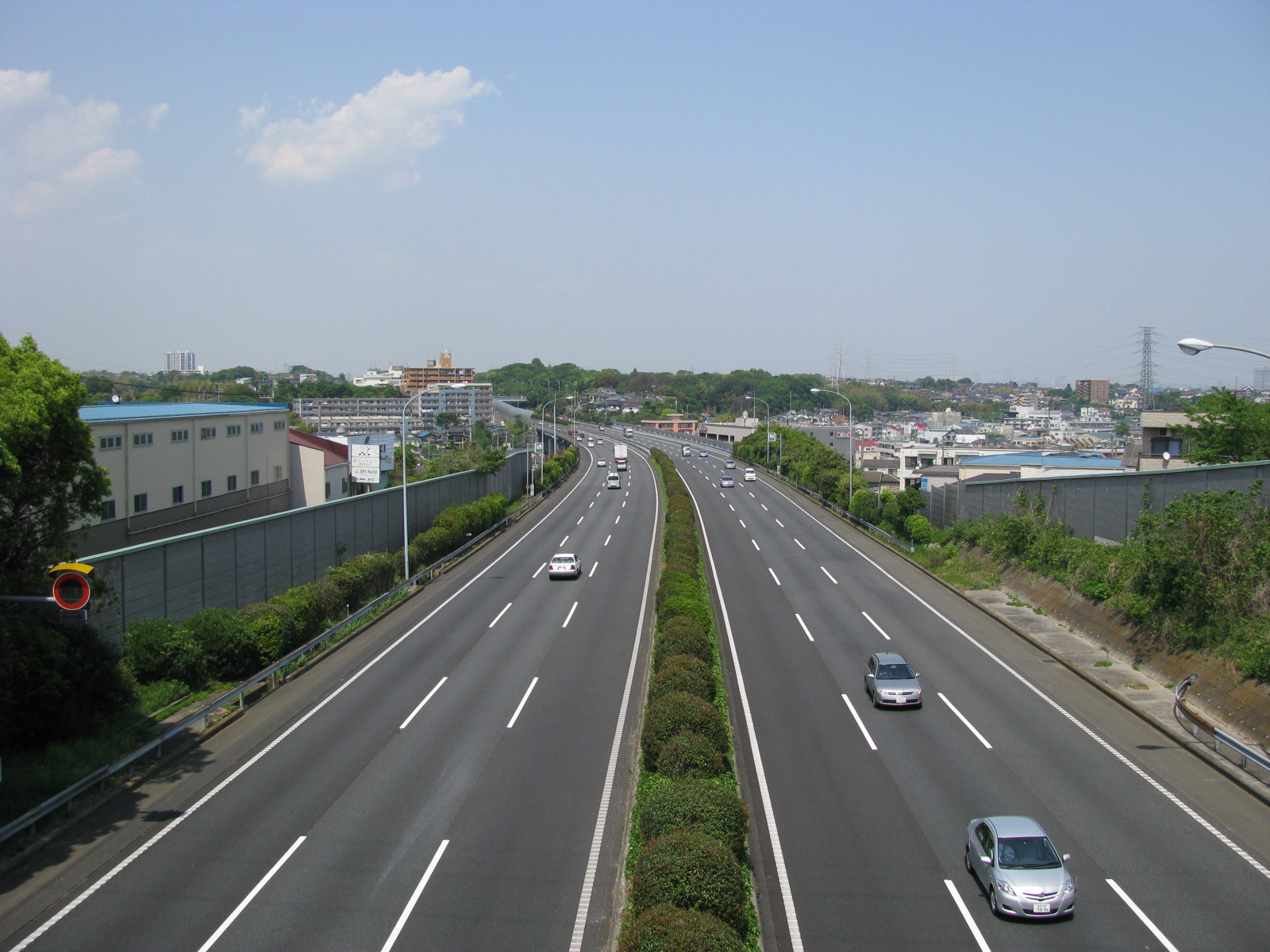
Developed national road 466 to Tokyo and Yokohama in Miyamae-ku

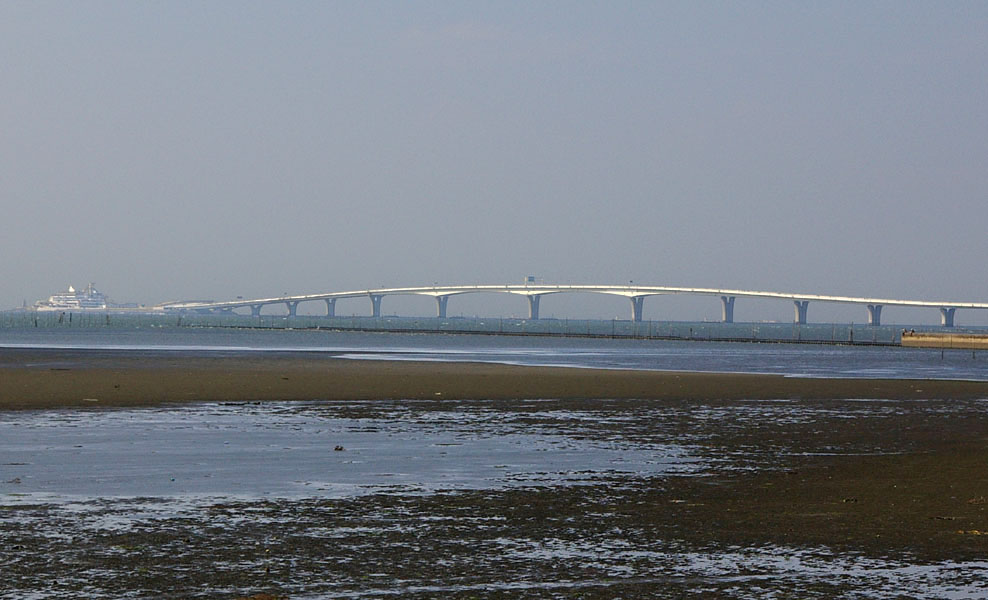
Tokyo Bay Aqua-Line is an expressway across Tokyo Bay.

Expressway
- Tōmei Expressway is a north-south expressway running from Tokyo to Nagoya and in central area. Tōmei-Kawasaki Interchange is served from Kawasaki.
- Daisan Keihin Road is a north-south expressway running from Tokyo to Hodogaya-ku, Yokohama and in central area. Keihin-Kawasaki Interchange is served from Kawasaki.
- Shuto Expressway Route K1 (Yokohane Route) is a north-south expressway running from Shuto Expressway Route 1 to Shuto Expressway Route K3 (Kariba Route) and in southern area. Daishi Interchange, Hama-Kawasaki Interchange, and Asada Interchange are served from Kawasaki.
- Bayshore Route is a north-south expressway running from Kanazawa-ku, Yokohama to Ichikawa, Chiba and in southern area. Ukishima Interchange and Higashi-Ōgishima Interchange are served from Kawasaki.
- Shuto Expressway Route K6 (Kawasaki Route) is an expressway in southern area. Daishi Interchange, Tonomachi Interchange, and Ukishima Interchange are served from Kawasaki.
- Tokyo Bay Aqua-Line is an expressway across Tokyo Bay from Kawasaki-ku, Kawasaki to Kisarazu, Chiba. Ukishima Interchange is served from Kawasaki.

National Route
- National Route 1 and 15 are north-south highways running in southern area. Due to elongated territory from east to west, these highways run short length in Kawasaki.
- Japan National Route 246 is a north-south highways running in central area. It also runs short length in Kawasaki.
- Japan National Route 132 is short highway running in southern area. It bounds National Route 15 and port of kawasaki.
- Japan National Route 357 is an industrial highway in southern area. It runs only in Higashi-Ōgishima Island in Kawasaki.
- Japan National Route 409 is a highway running from Takatsu-ku, Kawasaki to Narita, Chiba. It bounds central area and downtown area in Kawasaki.

== International relations ==
=== Twin cities ===
Kawasaki is twinned with the following cities in Japan and worldwide.

==== Domestic friendship cities ====
- (Nagano Prefecture) Fujimi, Nagano, since April 22, 1993
- (Okinawa Prefecture) Naha, Okinawa, since May 20, 1996
- Nakashibetsu, Hokkaido, since July 9, 1992

==== International ====
- Baltimore, Maryland, United States, since June 14, 1979
- Bà Rịa–Vũng Tàu province, Vietnam, since September 15, 2012
- Bucheon, Gyeonggi Province, South Korea, since October 21, 1996
- Lübeck, Germany, since May 12, 1992
- Milwaukee, Wisconsin, United States, since June 20, 1993
- Rijeka, Croatia, since June 23, 1977
- Salzburg, Austria, since April 17, 1992
- Sheffield, United Kingdom, since July 30, 1990
- Shenyang, Liaoning, China, since, August 18, 1981
- Wollongong, New South Wales, Australia, since May 18, 1988

=== Friendship ports ===
- Da Nang, Vietnam, since January 24, 1994

== Notable people from Kawasaki ==
- Koji Doi, professional wrestler
- Ryusuke Hamaguchi, filmmaker
- Hirokazu Ibata, former manager of Japan national baseball team
- Tomohiro Ishii, professional wrestler
- Yoohei Kawakami, musician (member of Alexandros)
- Osamu Kido, professional wrestler
- Takefusa Kubo, footballer
- Kaoru Mitoma, footballer
- Michael Nakazawa, professional wrestler
- Yui Niitsu, member of music duo Rythem
- Hajime Ohara, professional wrestler
- Yuto Ozeki, footballer
- Kazuhiro Tamura, professional wrestler
- Ao Tanaka, footballer
- Natsuki Taiyo, professional wrestler
- Natsuko Tora, professional wrestler
- Yuyu-uta, YouTuber, entertainer, and musician
