= 2005 Kawasaki mayoral election =

Kawasaki, Kanagawa held a mayoral election on October 23, 2005. Incumbent Takao Abe, backed by Liberal Democratic Party and the New Komeito Party won the election.

== Results ==
Mayoral election 2005: Kawasaki
Party	Candidate	Votes	%	±%
Independent, LDP, NKP	Takao Abe	229,021		
Independent, JCP	Hajime Okamoto	137,767		
Turnout		378,757	36.32	−0.44

== Sources ==
- Results from JanJan
- "LEAD: Murai wins Miyagi gubernatorial election". Japan Policy & Politics. October 24, 2005. Archived from the original on June 20, 2009 – via FindArticles.
