= Kuji Station =

Kuji Station is the name of two train stations in Japan.

- Kuji Station (Iwate) - (久慈駅) in Kuji, Iwate Prefecture
- Kuji Station (Kanagawa) - (久地駅) in Kawasaki, Kanagawa Prefecture
