= Yuyu-uta =

Japanese YouTuber, entertainer, and musician

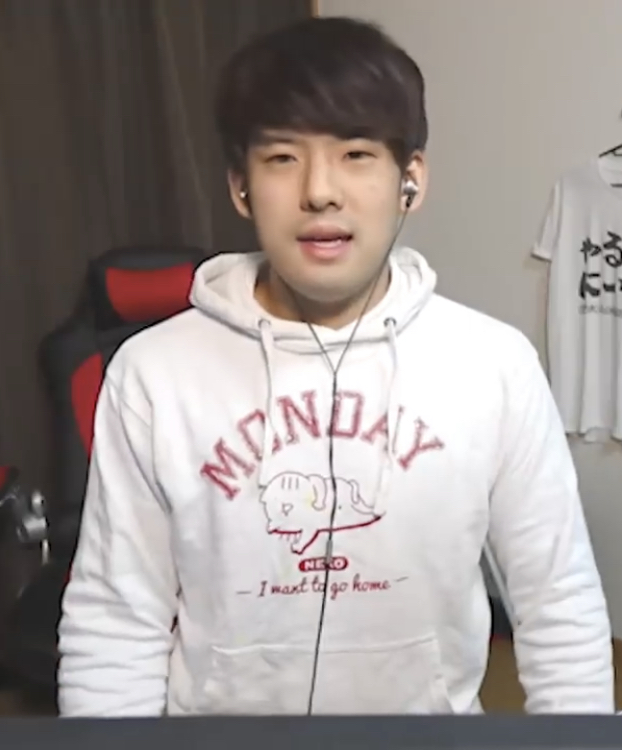
- Born: Yuta Suzuki; July 2, 1988 (age 37); Kawasaki, Kanagawa, Japan
- Occupations: Singer; pianist; songwriter

YouTube information
- Channel: Yuyuta Piano
- Years active: 2018-present
- Subscribers: 1.66 million
- Views: 750 million
- Last updated: October 22, 2025

Yuta Suzuki (鈴木 悠太, Suzuki Yūta), also known as Yuyu-uta (ゆゆうた), is a Japanese YouTuber, entertainer, and musician.

== Biography ==
Suzuki was born in Kawasaki, Kanagawa where he attended Toko Gakuen High School, then graduated from Tokyo Metropolitan University in 2010.

He began playing the piano at the age of 3 and originally started out on Niconico in 2007, though he didn't rise to fame until 2015. Soon after, he made a YouTube account in May 2018, later choosing to retire his Niconico account in April 2020.

As for his content, his most famous songs are typically crude, but popular among young Japanese people. For instance, he made an arrange of the North Korean song, "Konggyŏkchŏnida", and composed a song entirely out of vulgar words titled "OMMC", which is short for "Oppai Manko Manko Chinko" (おっぱいまんこまんこちんこ). In addition, he challenges himself to play the piano for extensive periods of time and was able to play for over 24 hours on May 10, 2020.

== Songs ==
- "Yuyu-uta's Self-dox" on YouTube
- "Konggyŏkchŏnida" on YouTube
- "OMMC (Oppai Manko Manko Chinko)" on YouTube
- "Kimigayorical Communication" on YouTube
