= Kawasaki Daishi =

Buddhist temple in Kanagawa Prefecture, Japan

Kawasaki Daishi 川崎大師
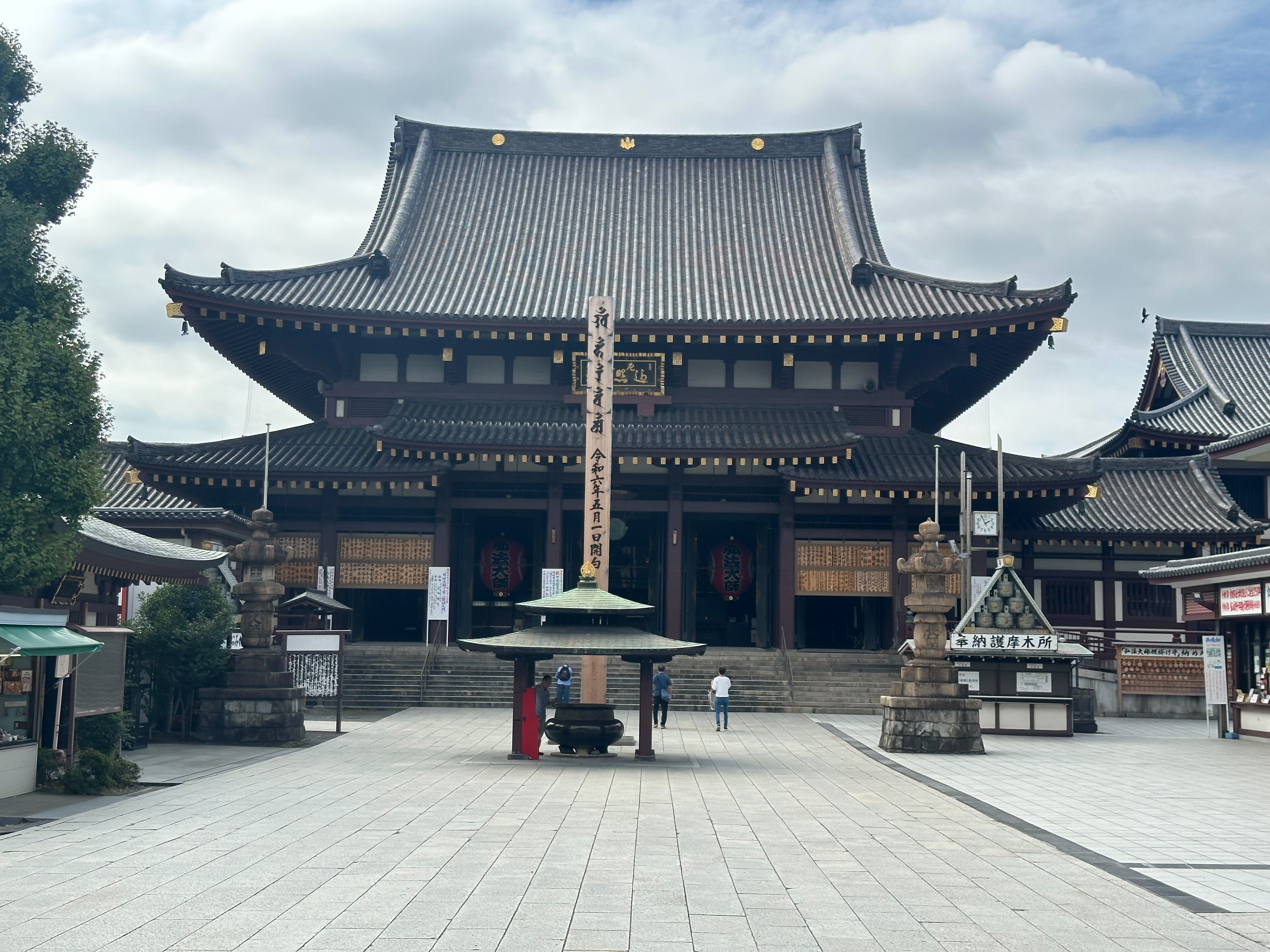
- The main hall of Kawasaki Daishi

Religion
- Affiliation: Chizan sect of Shingon Buddhism
- Deity: Kōbō-Daishi

Location
- Location: 4-48 Daishi-machi, Kawasaki-ku, Kawasaki
- Country: Japan
- Interactive map of Kawasaki Daishi 川崎大師
- Coordinates: 35.534°N 139.729°E

Architecture
- Founder: Sonken, Kanenori
- Completed: 1128

Website
- kawasakidaishi.com

Kawasaki Daishi (川崎大師) is the popular name of Heiken-ji (平間寺, Heiken-ji), a Buddhist temple in Kawasaki, Japan. Founded in 1128, it is the headquarters of the Chizan sect of Shingon Buddhism. Kawasaki Daishi is a popular temple for hatsumōde (the first visit to a place of worship in the new year). In 2006, 2.72 million people engaged in hatsumōde here, the third largest figure in Japan and the largest in Kanagawa Prefecture. In 2016, the temple made preparations to receive 3 million visitors over the same period. Keihin Electric Express Railway, the oldest railroad company in the Kantō region of Japan, commenced service in January 1899 to carry passengers to Kawasaki Daishi from Tokyo.

Heiken-ji is known formally as Kongōzan Kinjōin Heiken-ji (金剛山金乗院平間寺).

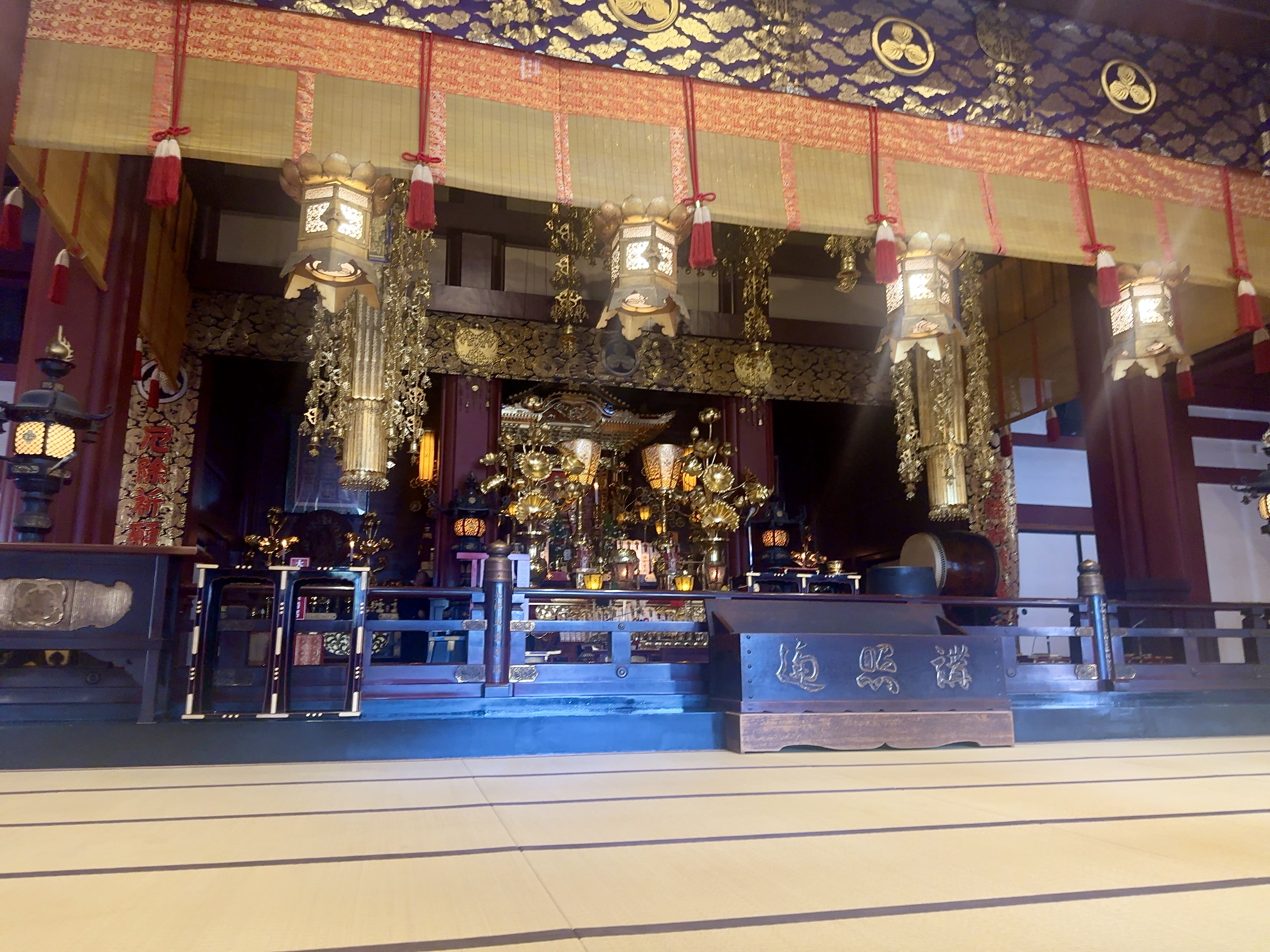
Inside the main hall

Several scenes, 2024

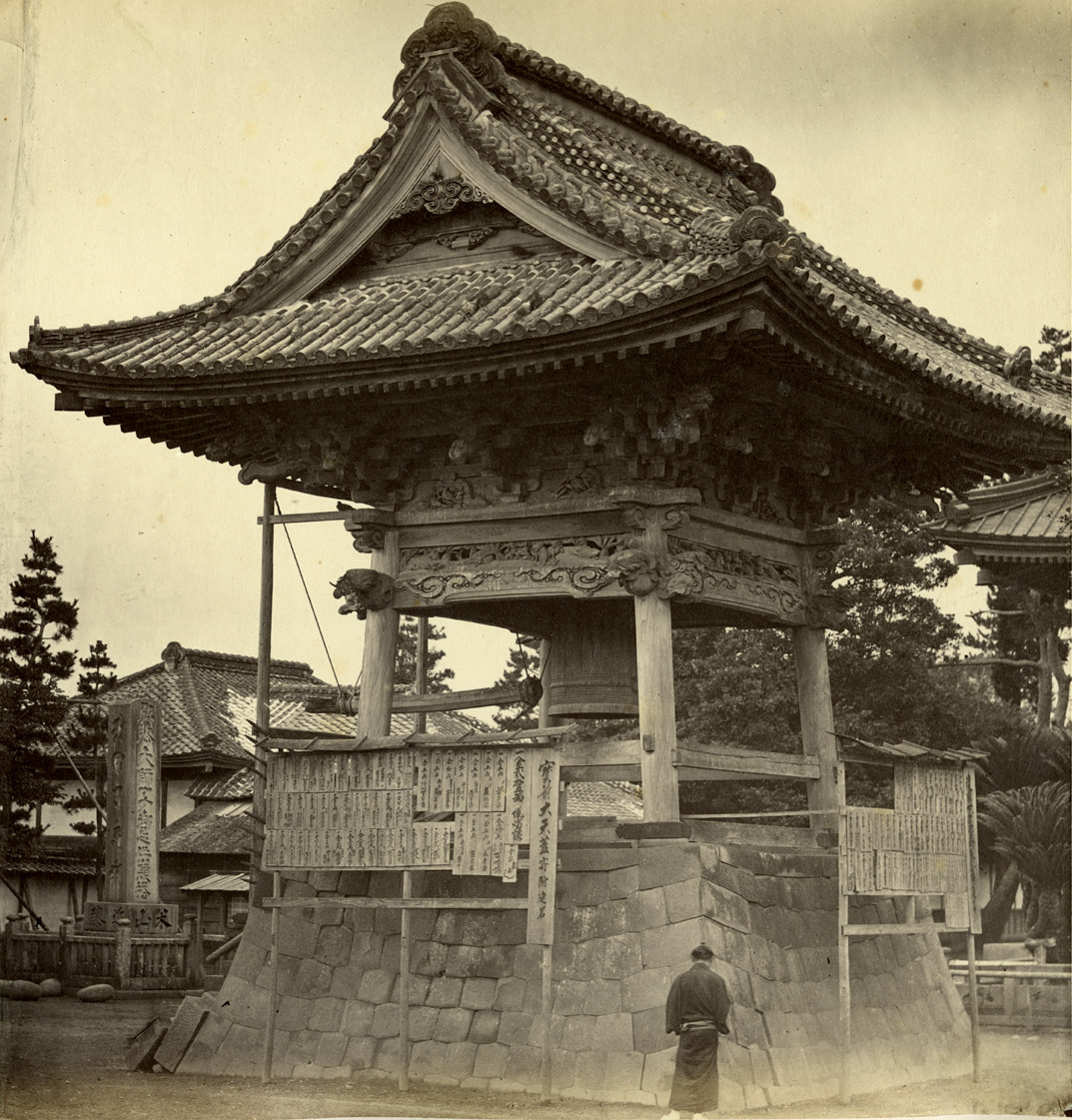
Photo of the bell tower (鐘楼堂, shōrō-dō) by Felice Beato

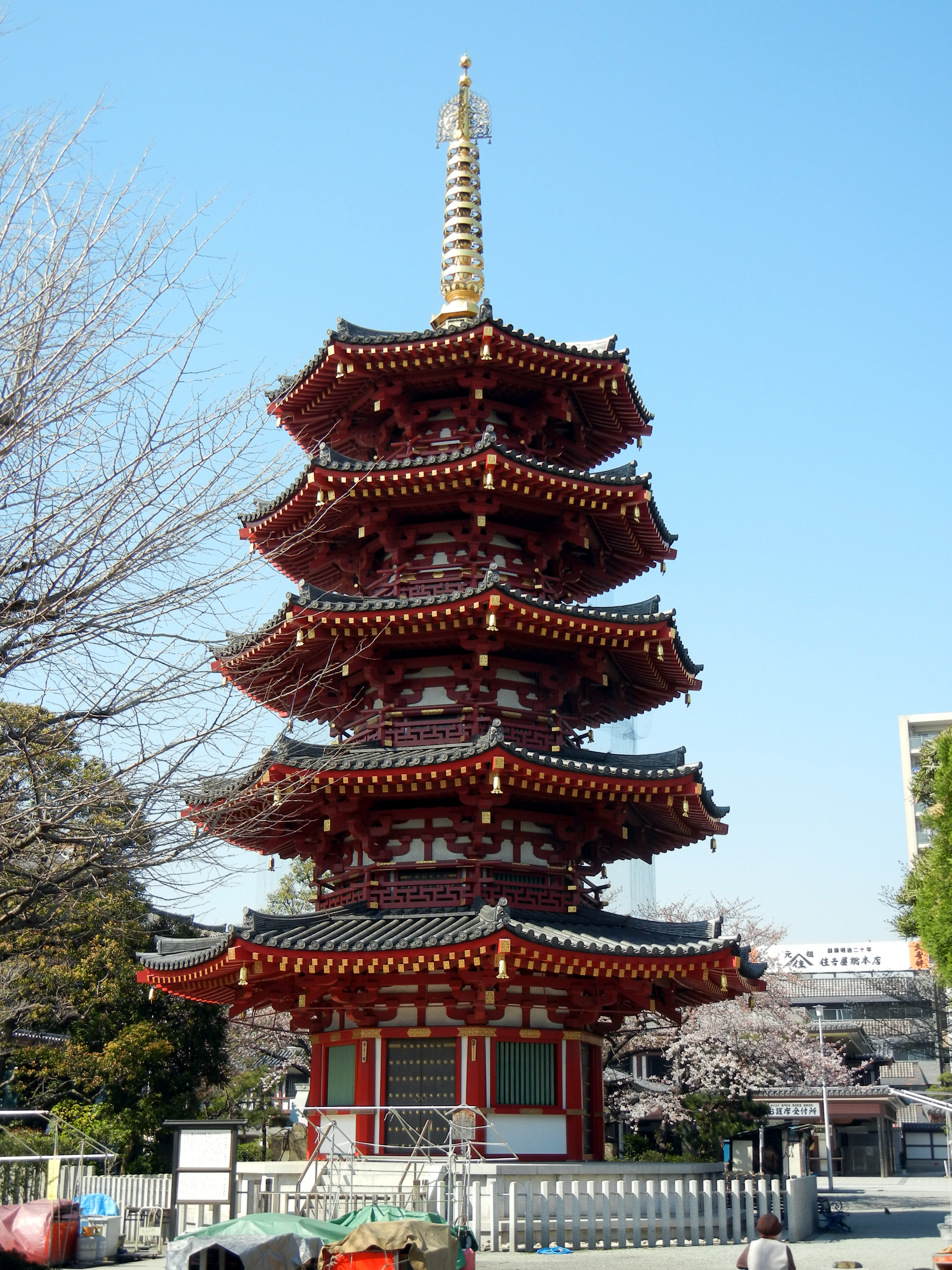
Kawasaki Daishi Restored Pagoda
