= Takao Abe =

Mayor of Kawasaki, Kanagawa in Japan

- 阿部 孝夫

Mayor of Kawasaki
- In office 19 November 2001 – 18 November 2013
- Preceded by: Kiyoshi Takahashi
- Succeeded by: Norihiko Fukuda

Personal details
- Born: 18 September 1943 (age 82) Mizuho, Fukushima, Japan
- Party: Independent
- Education: University of Tokyo

Takao Abe (阿部 孝夫, Abe Takao; born 18 September 1943) is a Japanese former politician who served as the mayor of Kawasaki, Kanagawa. He was first elected in 2001.
