= Shukugawara Station (Kanagawa) =

Railway station in Kawasaki, Kanagawa Prefecture, Japan

JN13 Shukugawara Station 宿河原駅
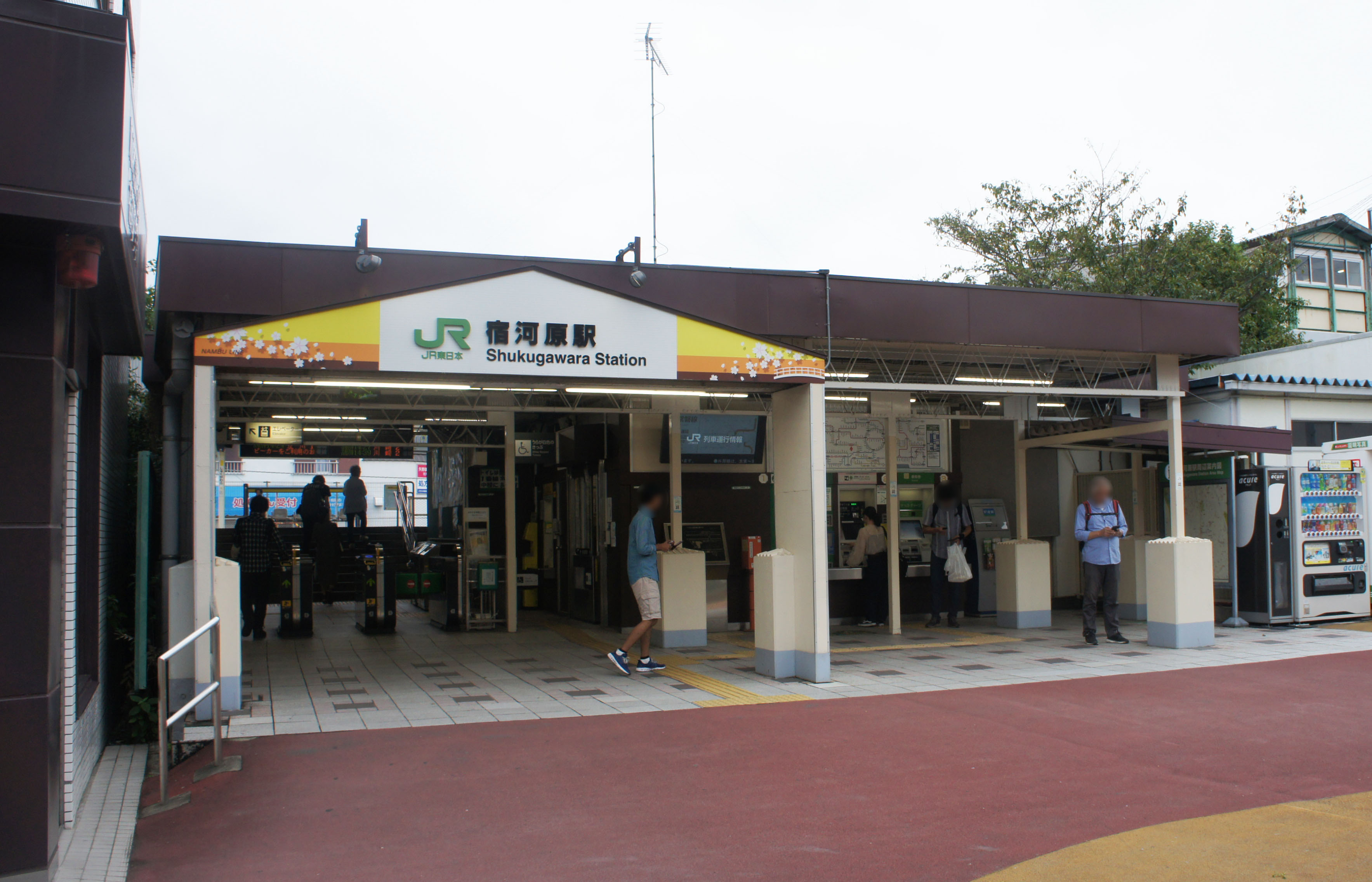
- Shukugawara Station, September 2019

General information
- Location: 4-4, Shukugawara 3-chome, Tama-ku, Kawasaki-shi, Kanagawa-ken 214-0021; Japan
- Coordinates: 35°36′55″N 139°34′46″E
- Operator: JR East
- Line: Nambu Line
- Distance: 16.2 km from Kawasaki
- Platforms: 2 side platforms
- Tracks: 2

Other information
- Station code: JN13
- Website: Official website

History
- Opened: March 9, 1927

Passengers
- FY2019: 8,266 daily

Services
| Preceding station | JR East | Following station |
|---|---|---|
| Noborito JN14 towards Tachikawa | Nambu Line Local | Kuji JN12 towards Kawasaki |
Location
- Location within Kanagawa Prefecture Location within Japan

Shukugawara Station (宿河原駅, Shukugawara-eki) is a passenger railway station located in Tama-ku, Kawasaki, Kanagawa Prefecture, Japan, operated by the East Japan Railway Company (JR East).

== Lines ==
Shukugawara Station is served by the Nambu Line. The station is 16.2 km (10.1 mi) the southern terminus of the line at Kawasaki Station.

== Station layout ==
The station consists of two opposed side platforms serving two tracks, connected by a footbridge. The station is staffed.

=== Platforms ===
| 1 | Nambu Line | for Musashi-Mizonokuchi, Musashi-Kosugi, and Kawasaki |
| 2 | Nambu Line | for Noborito, Fuchū-Hommachi, Bubaigawara, and Tachikawa |

== History ==
Shukugawara Station was opened on 9 March 1927 as a station on the Nambu Railway. The Nambu Railway was nationalized on 1 April 1944 becoming part of the Japanese Government Railways, and the station came under the control of the Japan National Railways (JNR) from 1949. Freight operations were discontinued after 1955. After the privatization of the JNR on 1 April 1987, the station was absorbed into the JR East network.

== Passenger statistics ==
In fiscal 2019, the station was used by an average of 8,266 passengers daily (boarding passengers only).

The passenger figures (boarding passengers only) for previous years are as shown below.

| Fiscal year | daily average |
|---|---|
| 2005 | 7,230 |
| 2010 | 7,240 |
| 2015 | 7,801 |

== Surrounding area ==
- Fujiko F Fujio Museum

== See also ==
- List of railway stations in Japan
