= Kuji Station (Kanagawa) =

Railway station in Kawasaki, Kanagawa Prefecture, Japan

JN12 Kuji Station 久地駅
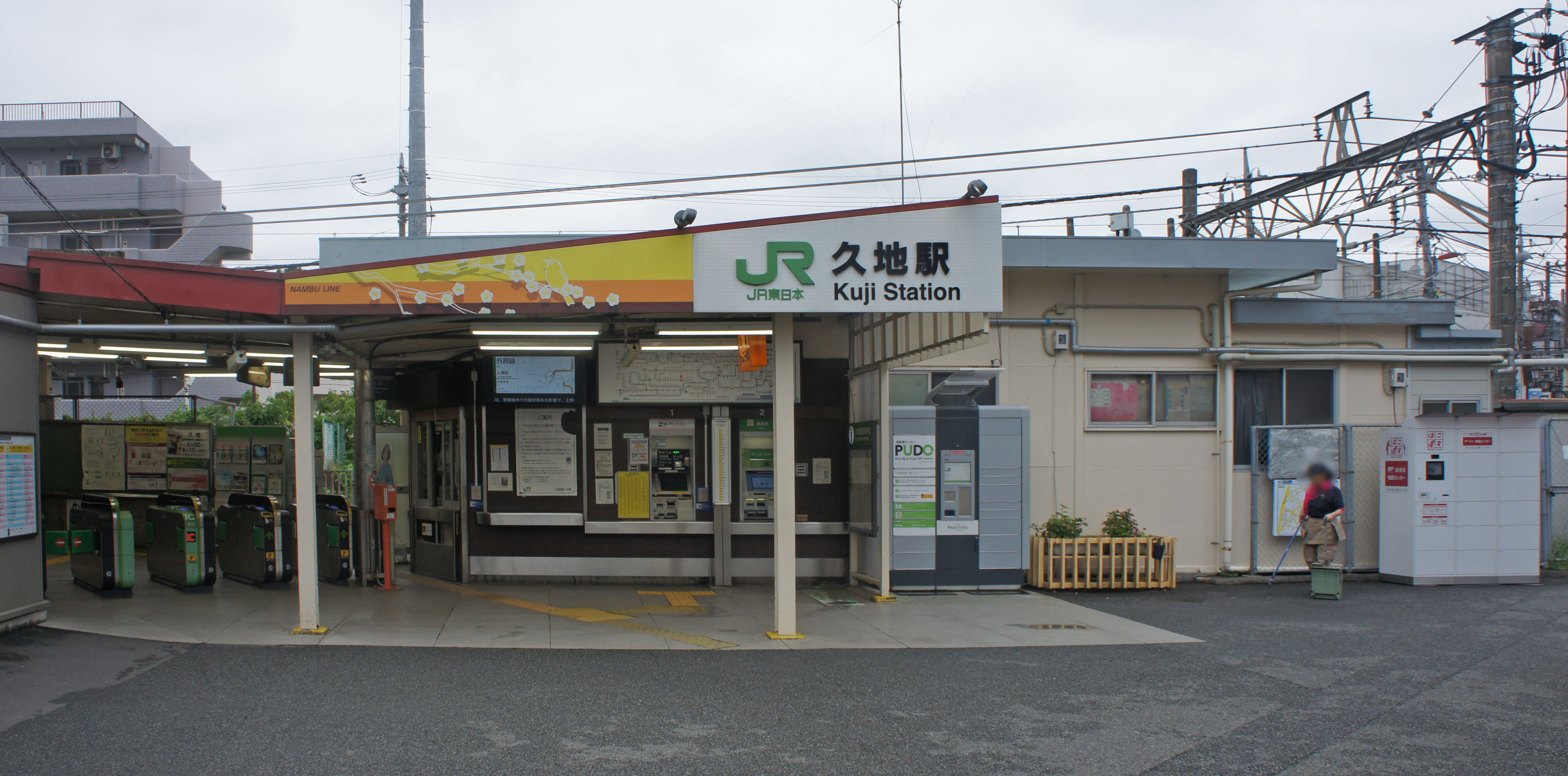
- Kuji Station, September 2019

General information
- Location: Kuji 4-24-1, Takatsu-ku, Kawasaki-shi, Kanagawa-ken 213-0032; Japan
- Coordinates: 35.6105°N 139.5928°E
- Operator: JR East
- Line: Nambu Line
- Distance: 14.9 km from Kawasaki
- Platforms: 2 side platforms
- Tracks: 2

Other information
- Station code: JN12
- Website: Official website

History
- Opened: April 16, 1942
- Former names: Kuji-Bairin (until 1942)

Passengers
- FY2019: 14,523 daily

Services
Preceding station	JR East	Following station
Shukugawara JN13 towards Tachikawa	Nambu Line Local	Tsudayama JN11 towards Kawasaki
Location
- Location within Kanagawa Prefecture Location within Japan

Kuji Station (久地駅, Kuji-eki) is a passenger railway station located in Takatsu-ku, Kawasaki, Kanagawa Prefecture, Japan, operated by the East Japan Railway Company (JR East).

== Lines ==
Kuji Station is served by the Nambu Line. The station is 14.9 km (9.3 mi) from the southern terminus of the line at Kawasaki Station.

== Station layout ==
The station consists of two opposed side platforms serving two tracks, connected by a footbridge. The station is staffed.

=== Platforms ===
1	Nambu Line	for Musashi-Mizonokuchi, Musashi-Kosugi, and Kawasaki
2	Nambu Line	for Noborito, Fuchū-Hommachi, and Tachikawa

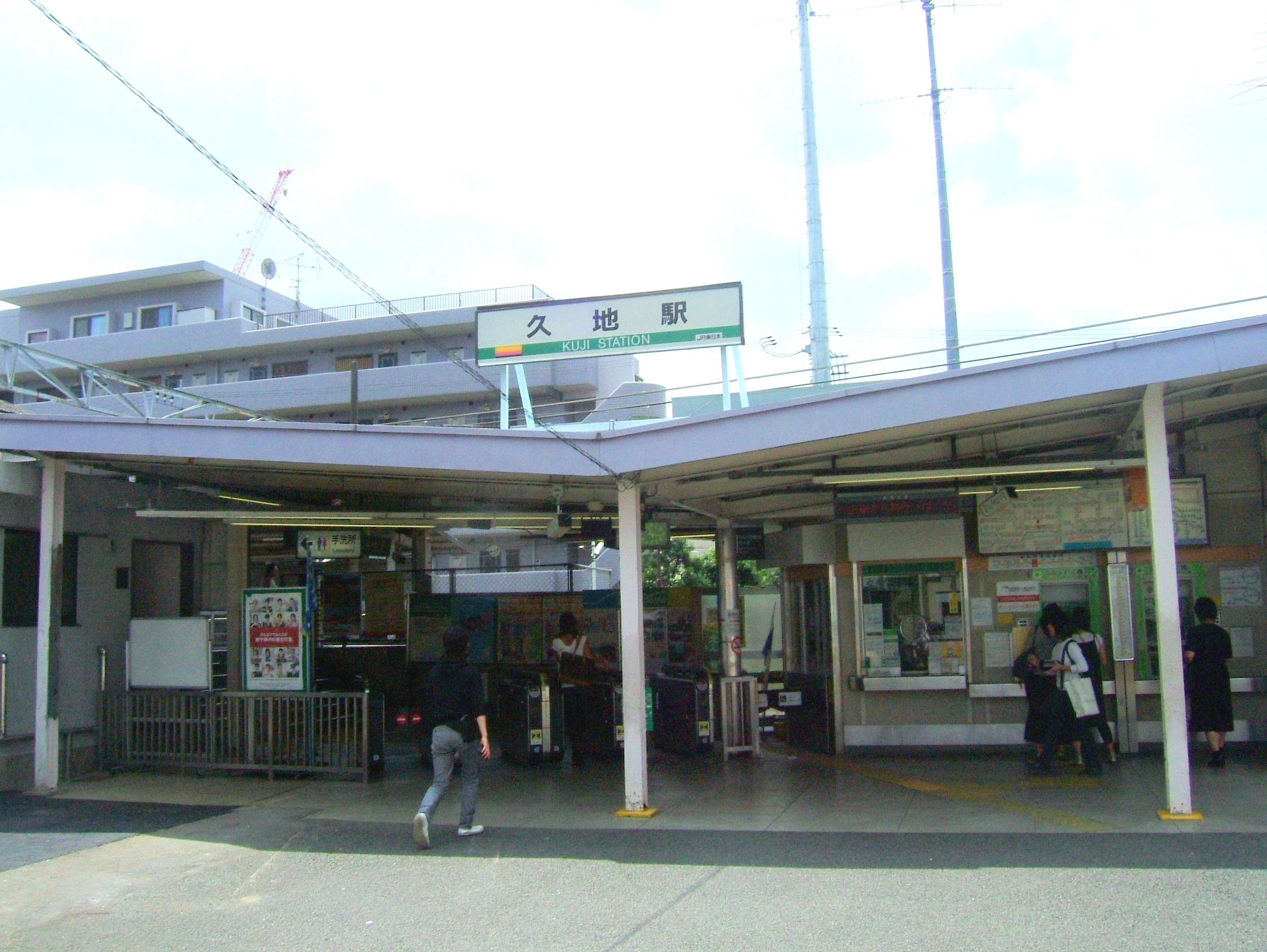
Old station building (September 2007)

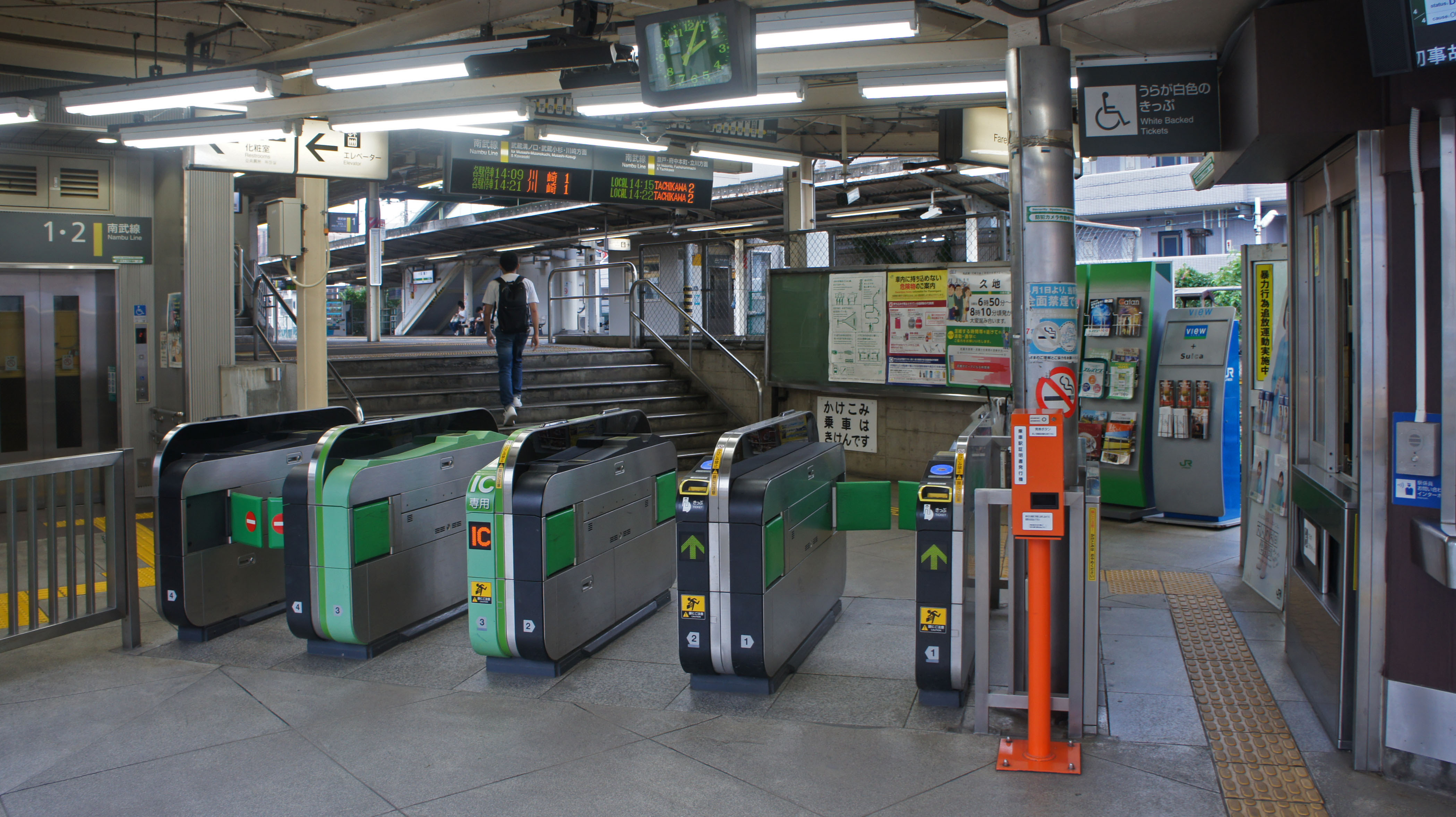
Ticket barrier (September 2019)

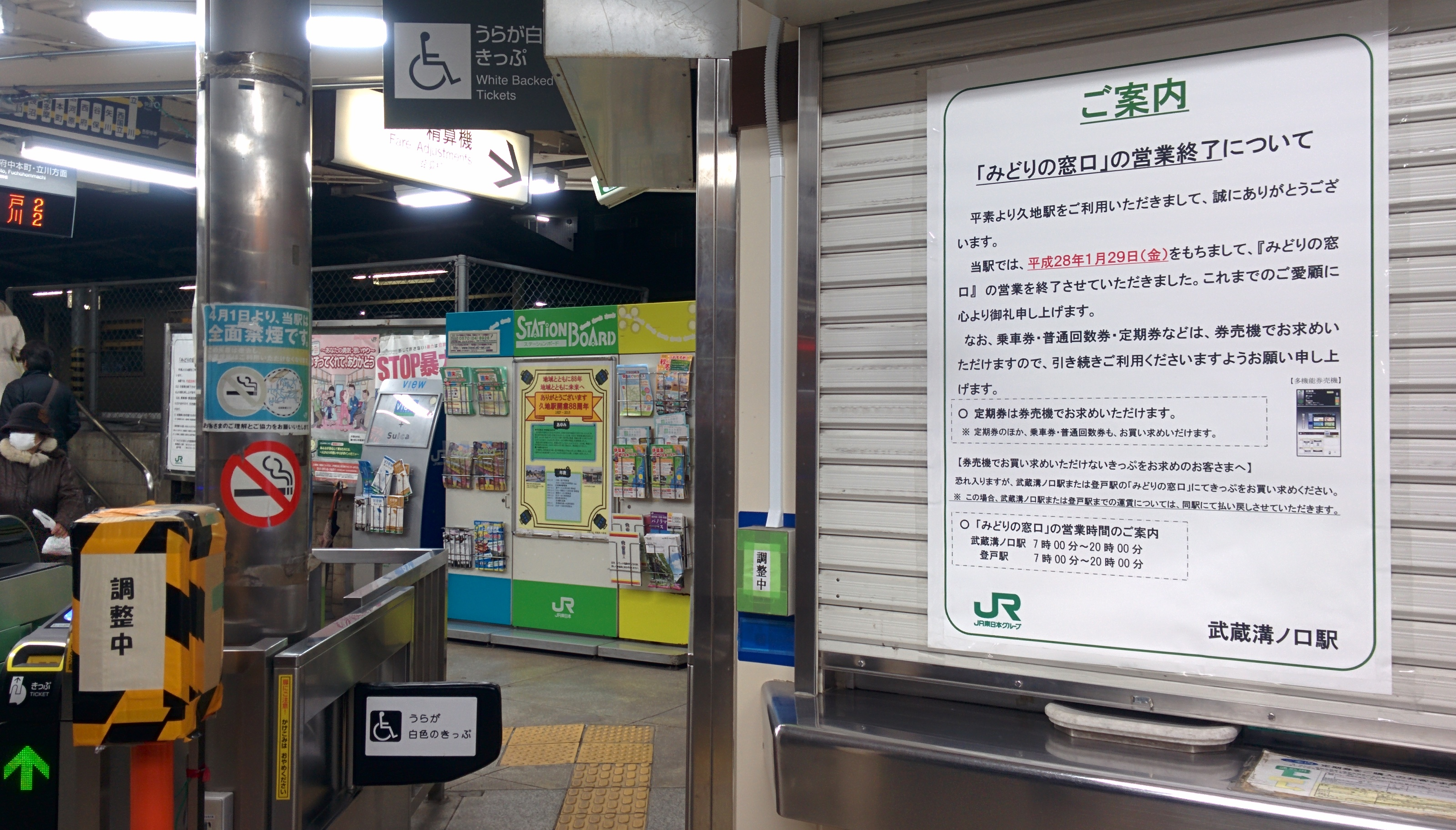
Closed Midori no Madoguchi ticket office (February 2016)

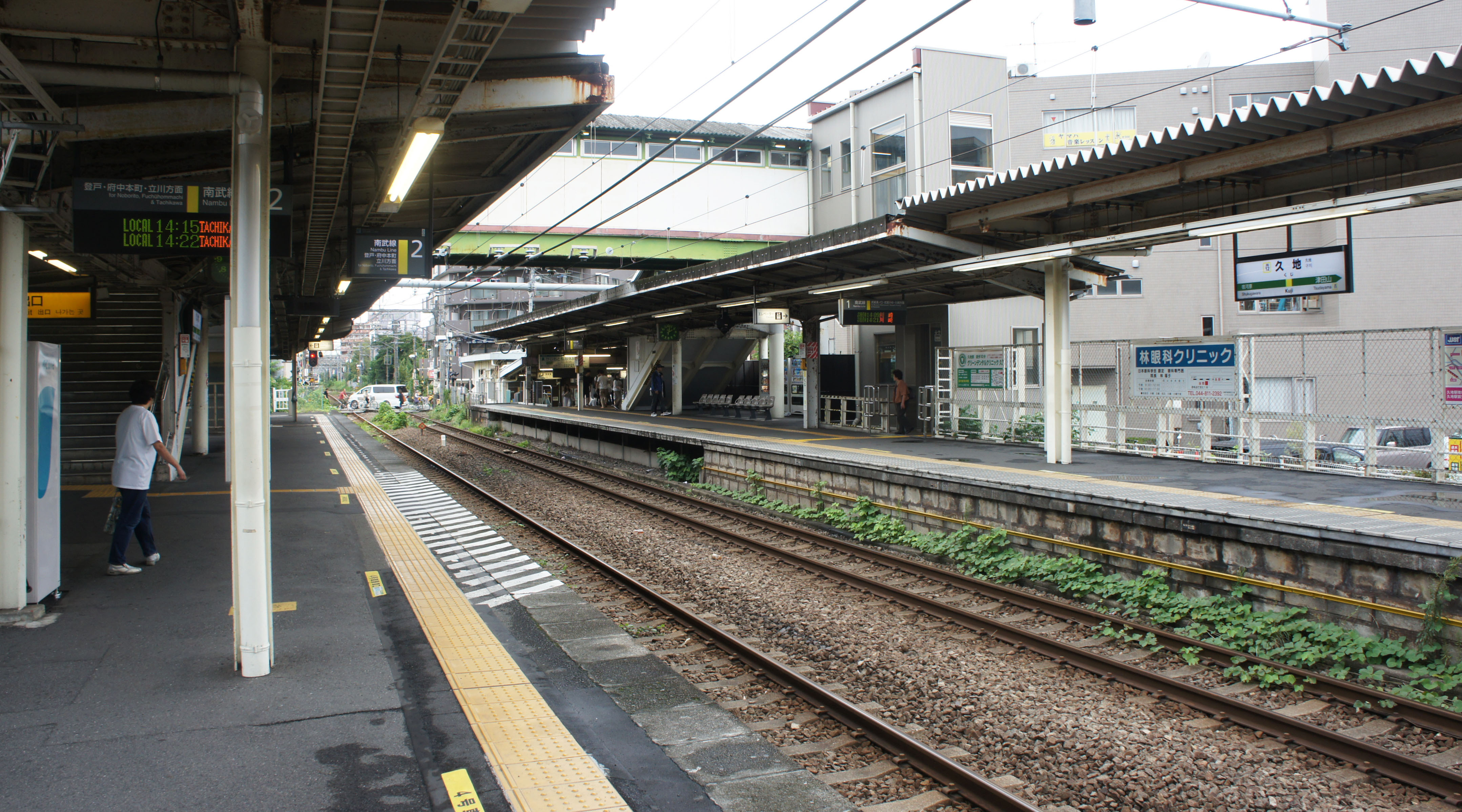
Side platforms (September 2019)

== History ==
Kuji Station opened as Kuji-Bairin Stop (久地梅林停車場, Kuji-Bairin-Teishajo) on the Nambu Railway on 11 August 1927. The stop was raised in status to that of a full station on 16 April 1942. Along with nationalization of Nambu Railway, the station became Kuji Station of Japanese Government Railway Nambu Line on 1 April 1944, and part of the Japan National Railways (JNR) from 1946. Along with privatization and division of JNR, JR East started operating the station on 1 April 1987.

== Passenger statistics ==
In fiscal 2019, the station was used by an average of 14,523 passengers daily (boarding passengers only).

The passenger figures (boarding passengers only) for previous years are as shown below.

Fiscal year	daily average
2005	12,472
2010	13,175
2015	13,954

== Surrounding area ==
- Kanagawa Prefectural Mukainooka Technical High School
- Kawasaki Municipal Midorigaoka Cemetery
- Higashitakane Forest Park

== See also ==
- List of railway stations in Japan
