= Tour of Flanders (men's race) =

Belgian one-day cycling race, one of the five monuments

Race details
- Date: Early April
- Region: Flanders, Belgium
- Local name: Ronde van Vlaanderen (Dutch)
- Nickname(s): De Hoogmis (in Dutch) / De Ronde (in Dutch); Vlaanderens Mooiste (in Dutch); Flanders' Most Beautiful (in English)
- Discipline: Road
- Competition: UCI World Tour
- Type: One-day Classic
- Organiser: Flanders Classics
- Race director: Wim Van Herreweghe
- Web site: www.rondevanvlaanderen.be

History
- First edition: 1913
- Editions: 110 (as of 2026)
- First winner: Paul Deman (BEL)
- Most wins: Achiel Buysse (BEL); Fiorenzo Magni (ITA); Eric Leman (BEL); Johan Museeuw (BEL); Tom Boonen (BEL); Fabian Cancellara (SUI); Mathieu van der Poel (NED); Tadej Pogačar (SLO) (3 wins each)
- Most recent: Tadej Pogačar (SLO)

The Tour of Flanders is an annual road cycling race held in Belgium every spring. The most important cycling race in Flanders, it is part of the UCI World Tour and organized by Flanders Classics. Its nickname is Vlaanderens Mooiste (Dutch for "Flanders' Finest"). First held in 1913, the Tour of Flanders had its 100th edition in 2016.

Today it is one of the five monuments of cycling, together with Milan–San Remo, Paris–Roubaix, Liège–Bastogne–Liège and the Giro di Lombardia. It is one of the two major cobbled classics, shortly before Paris–Roubaix, which is one week after the Tour of Flanders. The event had its only interruptions during World War I and has been contested every year since 1919, the longest continuous sequence for any cycling classic.

Eight men hold the record of most victories, making the Tour of Flanders unique among the major classics. Belgians Achiel Buysse, Eric Leman, Johan Museeuw, and Tom Boonen, Italian Fiorenzo Magni, Dutch Mathieu van der Poel, Swiss Fabian Cancellara and Slovenian Tadej Pogačar each have three victories.

Since 2004, a women's race has been organized on the same day as the men's over a shorter distance. Since 2021, the women's race shares the Tour of Flanders name with the men's race. To distinguish between them, they are now categorised as the 'Elite Men' and 'Elite Women' editions.

== Creation ==
=== The Ronde as a regional symbol ===
The Tour of Flanders was conceived in 1913 by Léon van den Haute, co-founder of the sports newspaper Sportwereld. In the era it was customary for publishers of newspapers and magazines to organise cycling races as a means of promoting circulation.

We thought there was a lot we could do in Flanders. We also wanted to publish a paper aimed at the Flemish people in their own language and give them confidence as Flemish. We conducted a 10-year war with the French-speaking management of the national cycling federation in Brussels. And we won it.

— Race co-founder Karel Van Wijnendaele

By the beginning of the 20th century, cycling was in a poor state in Belgium. Velodromes were closing and national championships on the road or track were no longer organised. The one major Belgian race, Liège–Bastogne–Liège, was in the French-speaking South. As the gloom increased, Odile Defraye became the first Belgian winner of the Tour de France in 1912. He was a 20-year-old Fleming and, although he rode for Alcyon, a French team, he symbolized a potential rise for Belgian cycling. Defraye's victory inspired August De Maeght, mayor of Halle and director of the press group Société Belge d'Imprimerie, to publish a Dutch-language sports magazine called Sportwereld.

Sportwereld's most prominent cycling writer was Karel Van Wijnendaele, a young sports journalist and cycling fan who had tried cycle-racing himself. (Note: Van Wijnendaele first wrote for De Torhoutenaer, his local paper, then from 1909 for Onze Kampioenen in Antwerp and Sportvriend in Izegem. It was then that he adopted his pen-name.) The first issue appeared in time for the Championship of Flanders on 12 September 1912. Van Wijnendaele became the editor of Sportwereld on 1 January 1913.

=== The Ronde and Flemish nationalism ===
All Flemish cities have to contribute to the liberation of the Flemish people

— Karel Van Wijnendaele on the conception of the Tour of Flanders, 1912.

Much has been written about the link between cycling in Flanders and Flemish nationalism. Van Wijnendaele wanted to create a race run entirely on Flemish soil, crossing as many cities as possible, because "all Flemish cities had to contribute to the liberation of the Flemish people". (Note: Van Wijnendaele, born into a poor Flemish family of flax workers, had worked for well-to-do French-speaking families in Brussels and Ostend and felt humiliated by the way they treated him.)

The Tour of Flanders is the only classic to have been held on German-occupied territory during the Second World War and in full agreement with the German command. The Germans not only allowed and enjoyed the race but helped police the route as well. This led to accusations of collaboration in an age where many Flemish nationalists had strong ties with Nazi Germany. After the War, De Standaard and Het Algemeen Nieuws-Sportwereld were sequestered by the state and several journalists, largely non-sports reporters, were sentenced for collaboration. Van Wijnendaele was forbidden to work as a journalist for life – a ban lifted when he produced a letter of support from General Montgomery, confirming that he had hidden downed British pilots during the war and had protected them in his house.

A rival Flemish newspaper, Het Volk, started the Omloop van Vlaanderen in 1945. Het Volk wanted to initiate a new cycling event in Flanders as a rival race to what it saw as the Ronde's closeness to the Nazis. The Ronde's organizers protested that the name was too close to their own– in Dutch there is little difference between Ronde and Omloop. The Belgian cycling federation demanded that Het Volk change the name of their event. That race became the Omloop Het Volk, nowadays the opening race of the Belgian cycling season. (Note: A consequence of the enforced decision to change the name of the upstart rival race to Omloop Het Volk was that rival papers, including Het Nieuwsblad were reluctant to mention the name of another newspaper (Het Volk) when discussing the race. Unable to use the old name, papers called it Ghent-Ghent, a description of its route. What made this even more odd was that Ghent-Ghent's route was the same route as that of the Tour of Flanders until the end of the war.)

== History ==
=== The first races ===
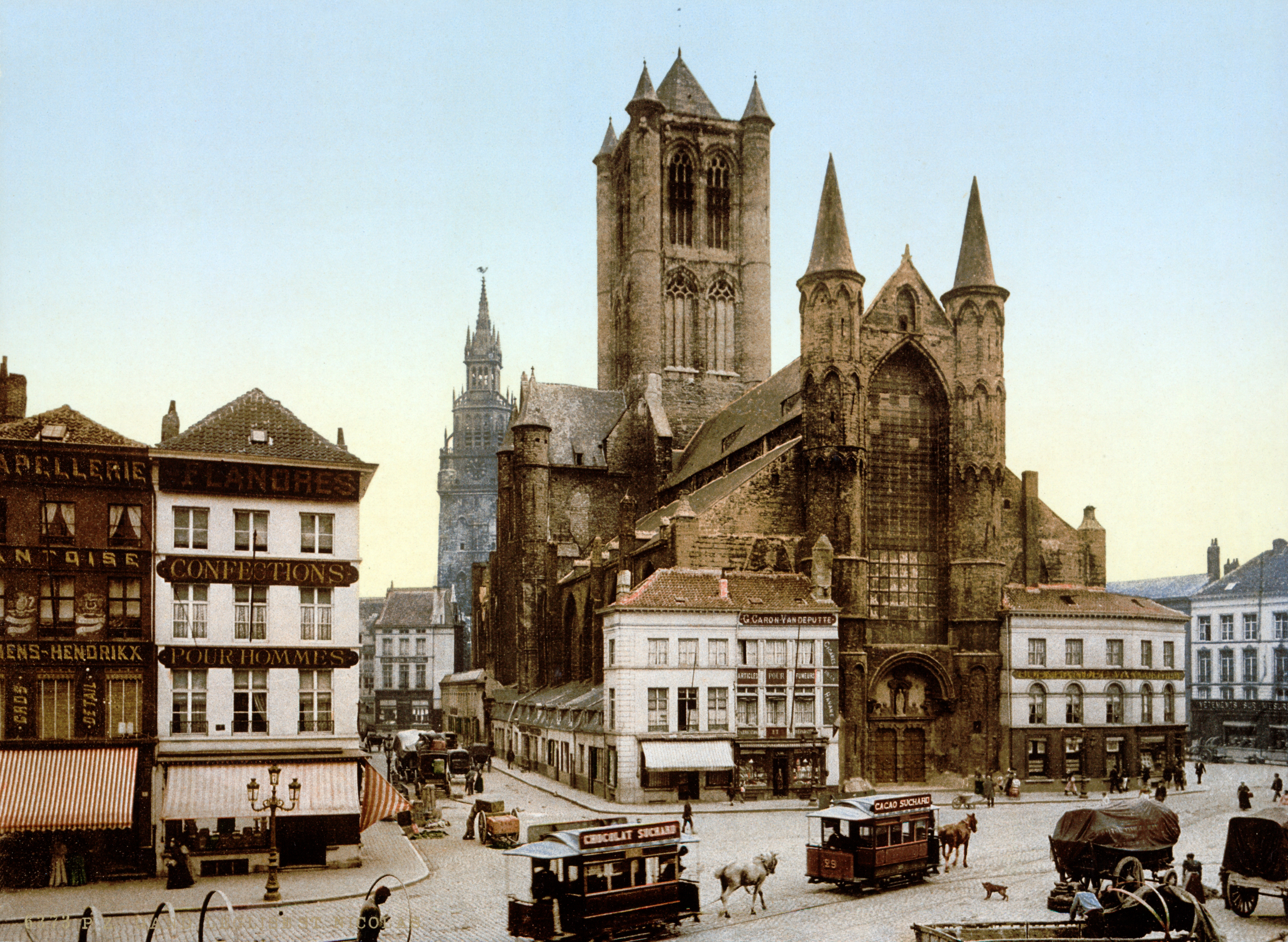
Korenmarkt, Ghent (pictured ca. 1890–1900), was the scene of the start of the first Tour of Flanders in 1913

On 25 May 1913 Karel van Wijnendaele organized the first Tour of Flanders, crossing the two western provinces of Flanders. It started at six in the morning in Ghent and finished in Mariakerke, now a suburb of Ghent. It covered 330 kilometres (210 mi), all on bad roads with just the occasional cycle path. The race finished on a wooden velodrome that circled a pond in Mariakerke, where ticket sales covered only half the prizes.

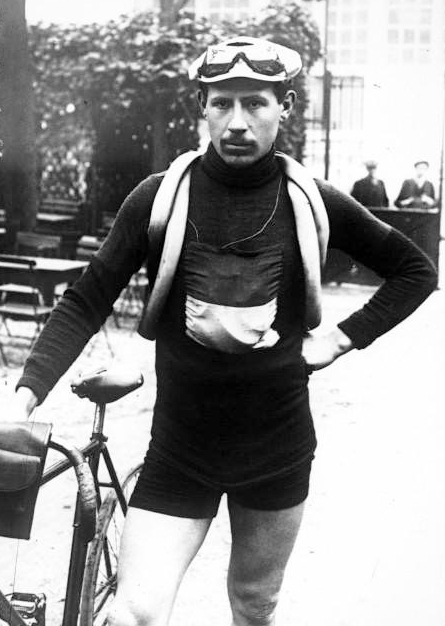
Marcel Buysse, winner of the second Tour of Flanders, pictured in 1913

The first race in 1913 was won by 25-year-old Paul Deman, who won the sprint of a six-man group after more than 12 hours in the saddle. Deman went on to win Bordeaux–Paris in 1914, but his career almost ended with World War I. He joined Belgium's espionage underground war effort and smuggled documents into the neutral Netherlands by bike. After many trips he was arrested by the Germans, jailed in Leuven and held for execution. The Armistice of 1918 saved his life and he became a war hero. (Note: American writer Gabe Konrad recounts that Paul Deman was "highly decorated, having received medals from Belgium, France and England for bravery". During an [espionage] mission to Holland, he was captured by enemy forces and sentenced to death. Luckily, the war ended just in time to save his life and send him home. Konrad, Gabor and Melanie (2000), Bikelore, On The Wheel Publications (USA),ISBN 1-892495-32-5, p100) (Note: He started racing again and won Paris–Roubaix in 1920 and Paris–Tours in 1923. Schroeders, Fer (1999), Les Classiques du 20ème Siècle, De Eeclonaar, Belgium, ISBN 90-74128-58-0, p146)

The first race consisted of 37 riders, followed by five assistance cars. In 1914 the field was 47 and the organization still struggled to find enough financial resources. A disappointed van Wijnendaele later said:

Sportwereld was so young and so small for the big Ronde that we wanted. We had bitten off more than we could chew. It was hard, seeing a band of second-class riders riding across Flanders, scraping up a handful of centimes to help cover the costs. The same happened in 1914. No van Hauwaert, (Note: Cyril van Hauwaert had become a hero by rising above his humble origins to achieve relative prosperity as a cyclist, "the man who had made it thanks to the bike", as Rik Vanwalleghem put it) no Masselis, no Defraeye, no Mosson, no Mottiat, no Van Den Berghe, all forbidden to take part by their French bike companies.

However, there were hints of the growing status of the race as a symbol of Flemish nationalism (see above). Marcel Buysse, one of Flanders' cycling icons in the early 20th century, insisted on entering the race, against the order of his French Alcyon team that forbade Belgian riders to participate. Buysse took part in the second edition in 1914 as one of the favourites and won the sprint of a group of six on the velodrome of Evergem, in the vicinity of Ghent. The distance was scaled back to 264 kilometres (164 mi).

=== 1920s: Birth of a legend ===
Silent film of the 1923 Tour of Flanders (French captions)

The Tour of Flanders was interrupted for the duration of World War I and was resumed again without interruptions as from 1919. The interwar editions were marked by appalling road conditions and grisly landscapes in war-ridden Flanders, but the Tour of Flanders gained popularity fast.

In the 1920s Flemish track specialists dominated the race. Gérard Debaets, a specialist of six-day racing in the American circuit, won the race twice; in 1924 as one of only 17 finishers in dreadful weather conditions. Swiss Heiri Suter became the first foreign winner in 1923 and achieved the first ever cobbled races "double" win with Paris–Roubaix one week later. In 1926, a group of ten sprinted to the finish. Five of them crashed heavily and Denis Verschueren, competing in his first race as a professional, won the event.

The start and finish of the race in Ghent started to attract hordes of fans and by the end of the 1920s, the Ronde had become the pinnacle of the cycling season in Flanders.

=== 1930s: Problems of success ===
"La Ronde" is as much part of the heritage of the Flemish people as the processions of Veurne and Bruges, the festival of cats in Ypres (Note: The kattestoet is an Ypres tradition from the Middle Ages in which cats were thrown from the belfry of the Cloth Hall, perhaps through the association of cats with witchcraft. The original kattestoet involved live cats. In this more moderate age, the ceremony is conducted with toy cats. It is usually only a mock witch that is burned afterwards.) or the ship blessing of Ostend. This cycle race is the most fabulous of all the Flemish festivals (kermesses). No other race creates such an atmosphere, such a popular fervour.

— Walloon writer Paul Beving and his tribute to his northern countrymen's race Schroeders 1999

If the first Rondes were held to limited public success, by the 1930s its popularity had grown so spectacularly that vast masses of spectators along the roads and cars following the race had turned the Tour of Flanders into a true cultural festival. By 1933, there were 164 participants and seven times as many cars and motorbikes in the race caravan. This booming of the event brought inevitable problems of safety. In 1937 writer and Flemish literary icon Stijn Streuvels wrote to Sportwereld that the Ronde, as seen from his house in Ingooigem, was "more a procession of cars than of riders". (Note: Stijn Streuvels, b. Heule, Belgium, 3 October 1871, d. 15 August 1969, was the pen-name of Frank Lateur of the Van Nu en Straks (Now and Soon) literary group in Flanders. He and van Wijnendaele became friends. Streuvels wrote when he was 97: "Karel made cycling what it is and the riders what they are.")

Race director Karel van Wijnendaele spoke of a "wild rodeo" of spectators driving behind the race and seeking shortcuts across the course to see the race several times. He claimed the police estimated the crowd for early races at 500,000. People followed the race in cars, overtook it when they could, or stood so thick by the roadside in villages and at control points that the riders sometimes had trouble passing.

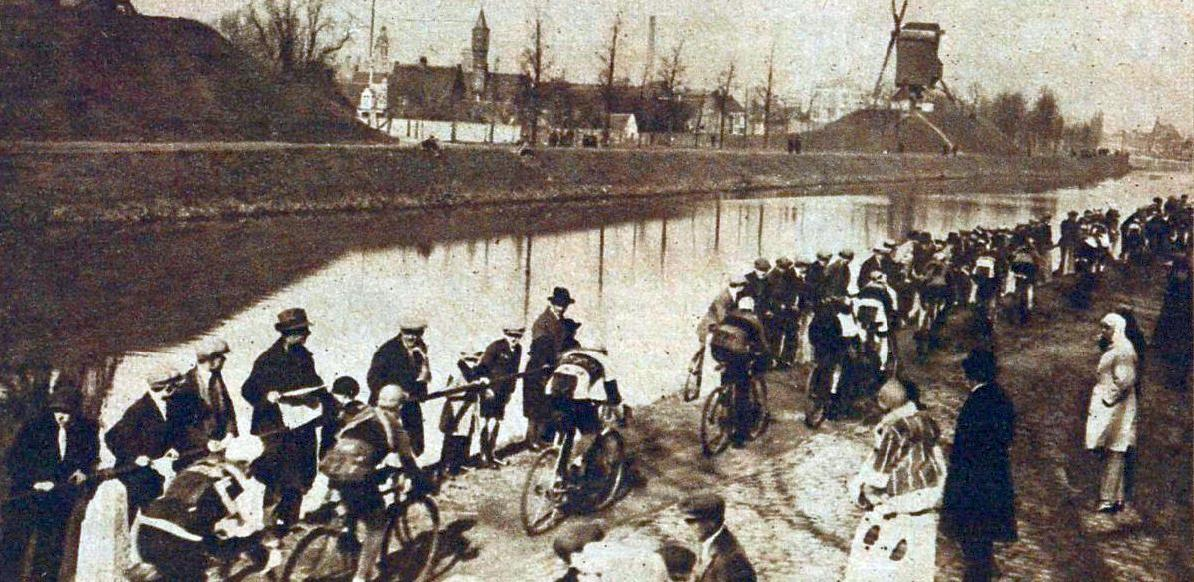
The 1929 Tour of Flanders on the dyke of the Bruges–Ostend Canal

In 1933, Van Wijnendaele involved the gendarmerie to control the plague of race-followers as much as possible, but to limited effect. The 1937 race was exceptionally chaotic with several accidents, causing race organizers to have the entire course secured by motorized police, in those days a revolutionary move. From then, the situation started to improve somewhat.

In sporting terms, the race grew more international with participants from France, Germany, Italy, the Netherlands, Switzerland and Czechoslovakia. Belgians continued to dominate however and Romain Gijssels became the first to win two consecutive Rondes. The editions of 1934 and 1935 were exceptionally rainy, making the races gruelling contests of perseverance.

==== Conditions for riders ====
The Ronde, in its first decades, followed the general rule that each racer was responsible for his own problems. Help from others was banned and riders carried spare tyres looped round their shoulders to cope with punctures. It could take two or three minutes to change and inflate a tyre, longer if it was cold or there were other problems. Tyres weighed around 500g (compared to currently around 200g). A rim or any other part of the bike that broke spelled the end of the race and still left the rider with the problem of getting to the finish.

Conditions improved in the 1930s and riders were allowed to accept a rain jacket, a spare tyre and a pump, but only in an emergency and at the judges' discretion. A change of bike was allowed only if a frame, wheel or handlebar broke, but riders were still expected to ride with spare tyres and a pump. Riders in the 1940s had to hand their bikes to officials the day before the race to have them identified with a lead seal, later with a ring similar to that fitted to racing pigeons. In that way the judges, or commissaires, could see if a rider had illegally changed bikes.

The Ronde moved towards modern rules in 1951, with riders being allowed limited help from team cars and to combine with others from the same team on the road. By 1955 it was possible to accept a replacement bike from a teammate but not from a car. The rules changed from year to year until they resembled those of today by the end of the 1950s.

==== Prizes ====
Prizes for the first race in 1913 came to 1,100 Belgian francs. By 1935 the fees and bonuses had increased to 12,500 francs, with 2,500 for the winner down to 125 francs for the 19th-place finisher (at a time when a newspaper cost 40 cents). In 1938 there was a bonus of 100 francs for any rider who had a lead of 30 minutes. Prizes during the war years were whatever the organisers could find, including boxes of razors, a stove, bottles of wine and cycling equipment. There were 100 francs in 1948 "for the last rider to reach the finish in Eeklo." The last four riders in 1949 were given bottles of massage oil.

=== 1940s: War years and resurrection ===
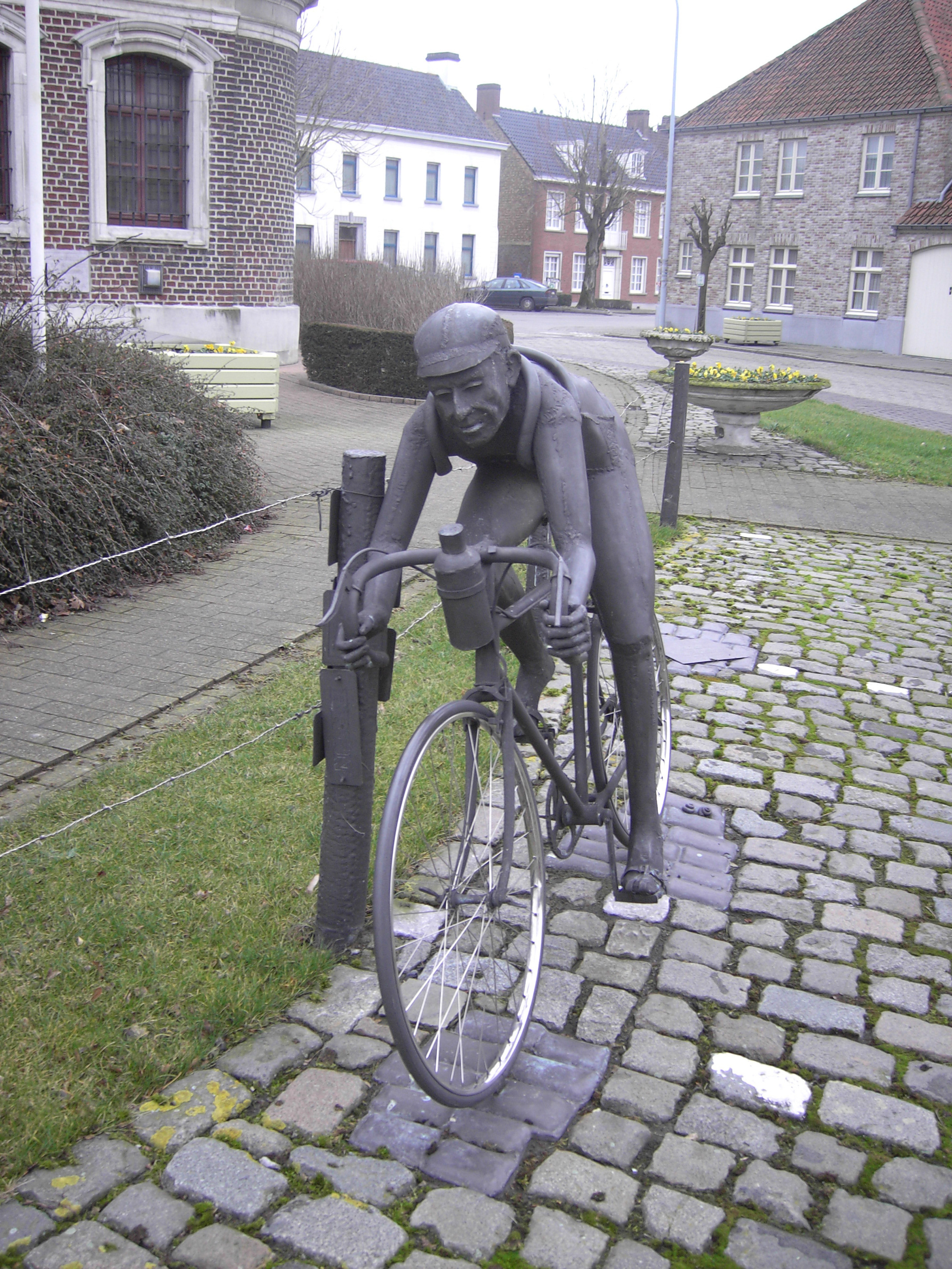
Statue in honour of Briek Schotte in Kanegem. Schotte won the race twice and holds a record 20 participations between 1940 and 1959.

In 1939, as World War II loomed, organizing magazine Sportwereld merged with Het Nieuwsblad, a popular daily newspaper. (Note: "Sportwereld" was made the sports section of both Het Nieuwsblad and its sister daily De Standaard) (Note: In May 1940 German troops occupied Belgium. The government fled to London and the king was held under house arrest.) During the war, many sporting events were cancelled, but the Tour of Flanders continued to be organized in agreement with the German command. (Note: The Germans not only allowed and enjoyed the race but helped police the route as well. "Konrad p101">Konrad, Gabe and Melanie (200), Bikelore, On The Wheel Publications (USA), ISBN 1-892495-32-5, p101) The first wartime race in 1941 was won by Achiel Buysse. Because of road restrictions, the course was altered to poorly surfaced roads and paths, starting and finishing in Ghent and totalling just 198 km (123 mi).

Despite the war conditions, the 1940s were the remarkable scene of some of the race's most famous champions. Achiel Buysse became the first rider to win three times. Briek Schotte and Rik Van Steenbergen gained two victories and became the leading figures of Belgian cycling. Schotte linked his named indelibly to the race with two victories, 20 starts, eight podium finishes and several memorable exploits. In 1944 young Rik Van Steenbergen controlled the race, distanced his rival Briek Schotte in the final kilometres and stunned followers by becoming the youngest winner ever at 19.

In 1948 the Tour of Flanders was included in the first running of the Challenge Desgrange-Colombo, (Note: The Desgrange-Colombo, named after the organisers of the Tour de France and Giro d'Italia, was cycling's first international season-long points competition. It was succeeded by the Pernod and Super Pernod competitions and eventually by the World Cup.) cycling's first international season-long competition, which had spurred its status as an international event. Until the Second World War, the Tour of Flanders had been held on the same day as Milan–San Remo, Italy's biggest cycling classic. Prominent Italian and French riders preferred the latter which explains why there was only a single non-Belgian winner before the war. The organisers changed the date to meet the needs of the Challenge Desgrange-Colombo. (Note: In an era when travel was difficult, the Desgrange-Colombo couldn't have two events on the same day and so the Ronde van Vlaanderen, as the newer race, changed its date to avoid Milan–San Remo.) The 1948 edition featured a record 265 participants, of which 50 non-Belgians, the largest peloton ever to take the start. Briek Schotte won his second Ronde.

=== 1950s: International Classic ===
Italian Fiorenzo Magni was the first exponent of the internationalization. The Tuscan achieved an unprecedented three consecutive victories in just four participations. The Tours of 1950 and 1951 set the tone, with solo wins by the Italian in cold weather. In 1951 Magni attacked with 75 km (47 mi) to go and finished 5' 35" ahead of Frenchman Bernard Gauthier. Attilio Redolfi came in third at 10' 32" from Magni. In 1955 cycling great Louison Bobet, by then a two-times winner of the Tour de France, became the first French winner. Another Frenchman, Jean Forestier, won the following year. Flemish fans needed to get used to the many foreign riders excelling in Flanders, but the international prestige of the race increased fast.

In the last 100 km (62 mi) of the race we were right behind the first riders. We barely saw them: there were so many people along the road and on the road that you had the impression of drowning in a tsunami. In front of me, behind me and beside me I saw cars being driven crazily through orchards, on the sidewalks, along cycle paths, behind spectators, in front of spectators. I felt bumps and bangs on the back of our car. If there were no accidents it was only because our dear Lord and his guardian angels were the best men in the race.

— Journalist Louis De Lentdecker in Het Nieuwsblad on the never-ending influx of spectators, 1963

=== 1960s: Ever-growing popularity ===
In 1961 Tom Simpson became the first British winner in a controversial two-man sprint against Italian Nino Defilippis. Defilippis was the faster sprinter, but stopped pedalling too early because a finishing banner had been blown away and was foiled by Simpson.

The influence of spectators never ended. Crowds stood in huge masses along the roads and the finish was moved to Gentbrugge, in order to cope with the ever-growing number of spectators. Rik Van Looy took his second win in 1962 as world champion amid hordes of fans, securing his status as flag-bearer of Belgian cycling.

In 1969 the young Eddy Merckx, on his way to becoming a cycling legend, took over this role when he broke clear from the pack with 73 km (45 mi) to go. In bad weather and despite objection from his team manager, he maintained his effort and won the race 5' 36" ahead of Felice Gimondi, the biggest margin ever.

=== 1970s: Controversies and doping ===
In the 1970s the Tour of Flanders needed a new identity. The asphalting of many of the traditional roads and hills made the race less demanding and more riders were able to keep up with the best. Eric Leman became the local hero when he won three times in four years, thereby equalling Buysse and Magni's record. Sprint specialist Leman outsprinted Eddy Merckx as part of a select group on each of his wins, much to the discontent of fans and organisers.

In order to preserve the Ronde's specific character, organisers increased the number of hills and searched for more backroads in the Flemish Ardennes. In 1973 the finish was moved to Meerbeke, not far after the Muur of Geraardsbergen, which became an iconic climb of the race and of Belgian cycling. Three years later the controversial Koppenberg was included.

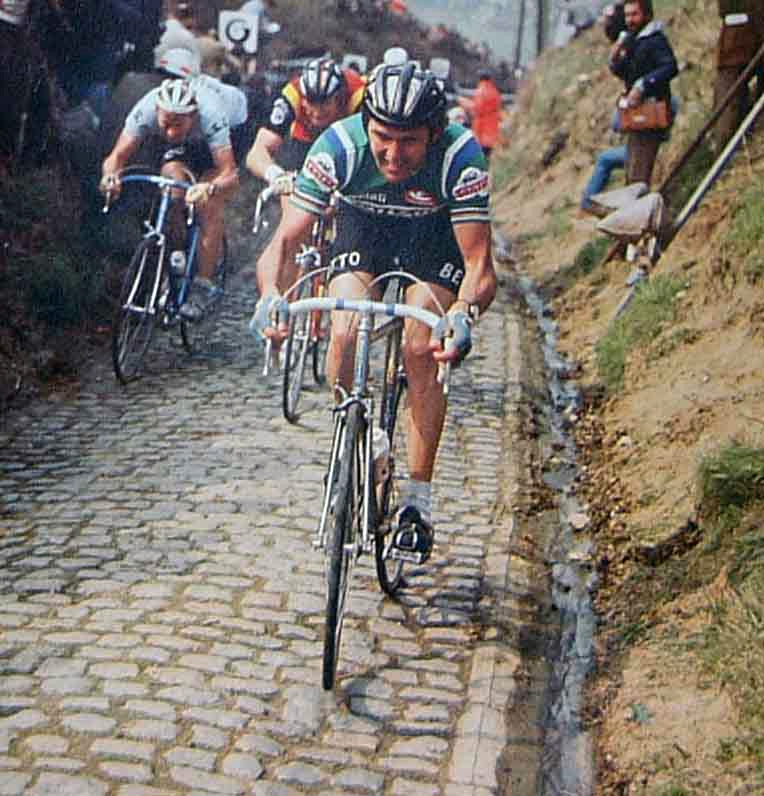
Roger De Vlaeminck, on the Koppenberg in 1977, would win that year's race, but was booed by fans for his dispute with Freddy Maertens.

It marked the beginning of some sensational editions of the race. In 1975 Eddy Merckx concluded his second win after another memorable raid to the finish. Merckx, in the rainbow jersey, escaped from the peloton together with Frans Verbeeck with 104 km (65 mi) to ride, before distancing his worn-out companion 6 km (3.7 mi) before Meerbeke. In 1976 Freddy Maertens and Roger De Vlaeminck, two of Belgium's star riders, were part of a five-man group and favourites to win the sprint, but the two did not get on and let themselves jointly be dropped at 4 km (2.5 mi) from the finish. De Vlaeminck beat Maertens for fourth place, acknowledging his mistake, but stated that "he did not want Maertens to win".

In 1977 their rivalry culminated in what became a peculiar race. Maertens punctured on the Koppenberg and was given a wheel by a spectator who pushed him all the way up. De Vlaeminck broke clear, but punctured shortly after and was caught by a returning Maertens. As both riders were alone at the front of the race, De Vlaeminck refused to work. For 70 km (43 mi), Maertens rode to the finish with De Vlaeminck on his wheel and was easily beaten by the latter in a two-man sprint. It was De Vlaeminck's only win. To this day, both protagonists make contradictory statements about what happened. Maertens stated that the judges had told him he would be disqualified for his illegal wheel-change and that De Vlaeminck had offered him 300.000 francs to keep riding. De Vlaeminck denies this, saying that he tactically stayed on Maertens' wheel, whom he considered the better sprinter. After the race, the controversy heightened even more, when Maertens and third-place finisher Walter Planckaert tested positive for doping and were both disqualified.

=== 1980s: Dutch and Belgians ===
The 1980s were monopolized by Dutch and Belgian riders. Dutchman Jan Raas won twice and in 1986 Adri van der Poel concluded the fifth win in seven years by a Dutch rider. Van der Poel beat Ireland's Sean Kelly and Canadian Steve Bauer in a four-man sprint.

However, the decade will forever be remembered for the apocalyptic edition of 1985, won by Eric Vanderaerden. The 23-year-old Belgian suffered a broken wheel before the Koppenberg, but returned to the front of the race in a group with Hennie Kuiper, Greg LeMond and his teammate Phil Anderson. Vanderaerden, considered a sprinter, attacked on the Muur of Geraardsbergen and rounded off a 20 km (12 mi) solo break. The race gained a place in cycling legend because a severe storm broke out in the second half of the race, with strong winds and torrential rainfall ravaging the peloton. Only 24 of 174 starters finished the race, the lowest number in modern times.

In 1987 Claude Criquielion became the first French-speaking Belgian winner, with an attack after the Bosberg, thereby relegating Sean Kelly to second place again. Classics specialist Kelly finished second on three occasions, but the Ronde remained the only monument classic he never won.

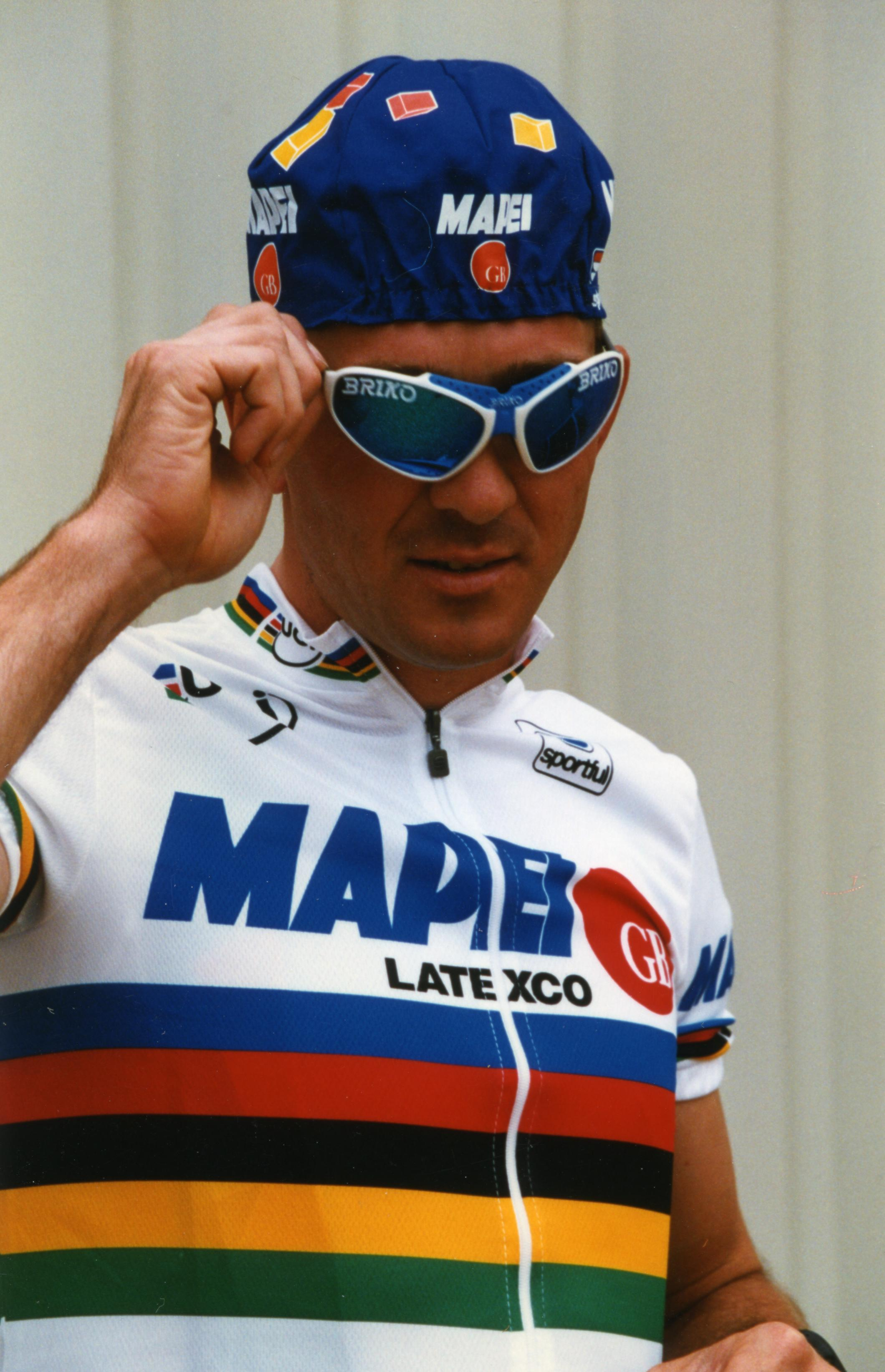
Johan Museeuw took eight podium finishes, of which three were wins, in the 1990s.

=== 1990s: Lion of Flanders ===
In 1989 the race was included in the first UCI Road World Cup, a season-long competition comprising the 10 most important one-day cycling events. More riders specialized in the classics, with the Tour of Flanders scheduled as the first of the April Classics.

In 1993 Belgian Johan Museeuw won the race in a two-man sprint with Frans Maassen and began to dominate the race for years. Meanwhile, the Italian classics specialists were also keen on winning the race, with Moreno Argentin, Gianni Bugno and Michele Bartoli each taking one win. In 1994 Bugno beat Museeuw by 7 mm (0.28 in) in a four-man sprint, the smallest margin in history. The next day Flemish newspaper Het Laatste Nieuws put the photo finish on its cover, accompanied by the headline "The Sorrow of Flanders". Nonetheless, Museeuw dominated the race for a decade, with a series of eight podium finishes and three victories. The Flemish media awarded him the highest possible nickname, the Lion of Flanders, in reference to Robert III, Count of Flanders.

=== 21st century: Monument race ===
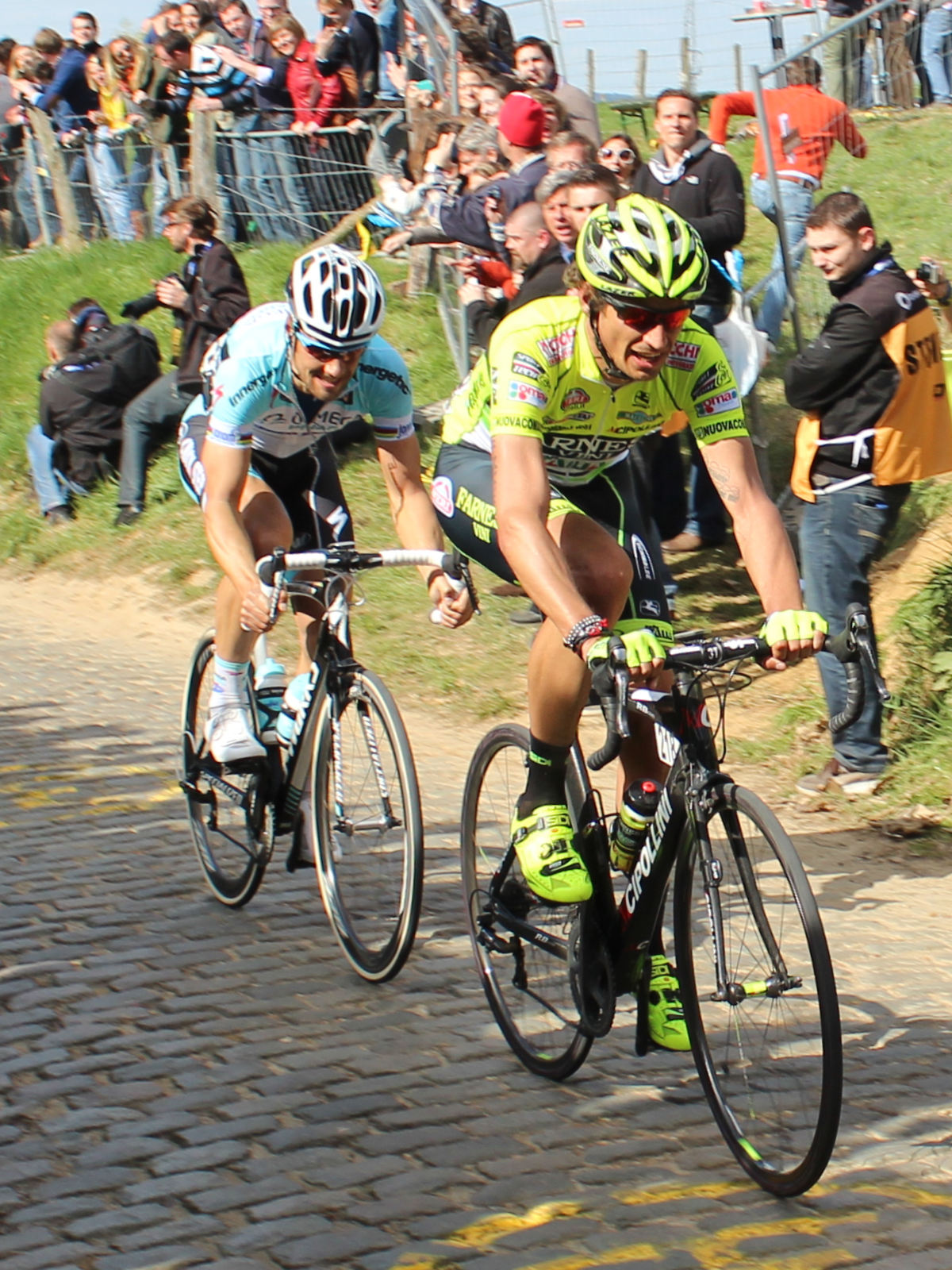
Filippo Pozzato and Tom Boonen attacking on the final ascent of Oude Kwaremont in 2012. Boonen won the race.

Classic riders Gianluca Bortolami and Andrea Tafi continued an Italian tradition with victories in the early 2000s. In 2005 the race was included in the inaugural UCI Pro Tour and in 2011 in its successor, the World Tour, so establishing its status as one of the five monuments on the cycling calendar. Tom Boonen became the new star of Belgian cycling with two consecutive victories.

In 2010 Boonen, seeking his third win, attacked with Fabian Cancellara 45 km (28 mi) from the finish. Boonen was favourite to win, but could not keep up with Cancellara's high-paced attack on the Muur van Geraardsbergen. The Swiss time trial specialist powered on in the final 16 km (9.9 mi) to his first win.

In 2011 the Tour of Flanders was taken over by Flanders Classics, which owns most of the Flemish classic races. In their first decision, the new organizers restyled the race and moved the finish to Oudenaarde in 2012. The edition saw Tom Boonen taking his third and final win in a three-man sprint against Italians Ballan and Pozzato. The two following years were again dominated by Fabian Cancellara who based his wins on attacks on the Oude Kwaremont. In 2015 both Boonen and Cancellara were unable to participate because of injuries, and Alexander Kristoff became the first Norwegian winner of the race.

In 2016 the Tour of Flanders celebrated its 100th edition, anticipated by a highly mediatized promotional campaign. The edition was won by Peter Sagan, who confirmed his status as the new foremost classics rider in the peloton.

The 2020 Tour of Flanders was moved to October and shortened by 12km due to the COVID-19 pandemic. In 2021, race organisers Flanders Classics unified the branding of the race, with the women's race sharing the Tour of Flanders name with the men's race. To distinguish between the two, they are now categorised as the 'Elite Men' and 'Elite Women' editions.

== Route ==
=== Present course ===
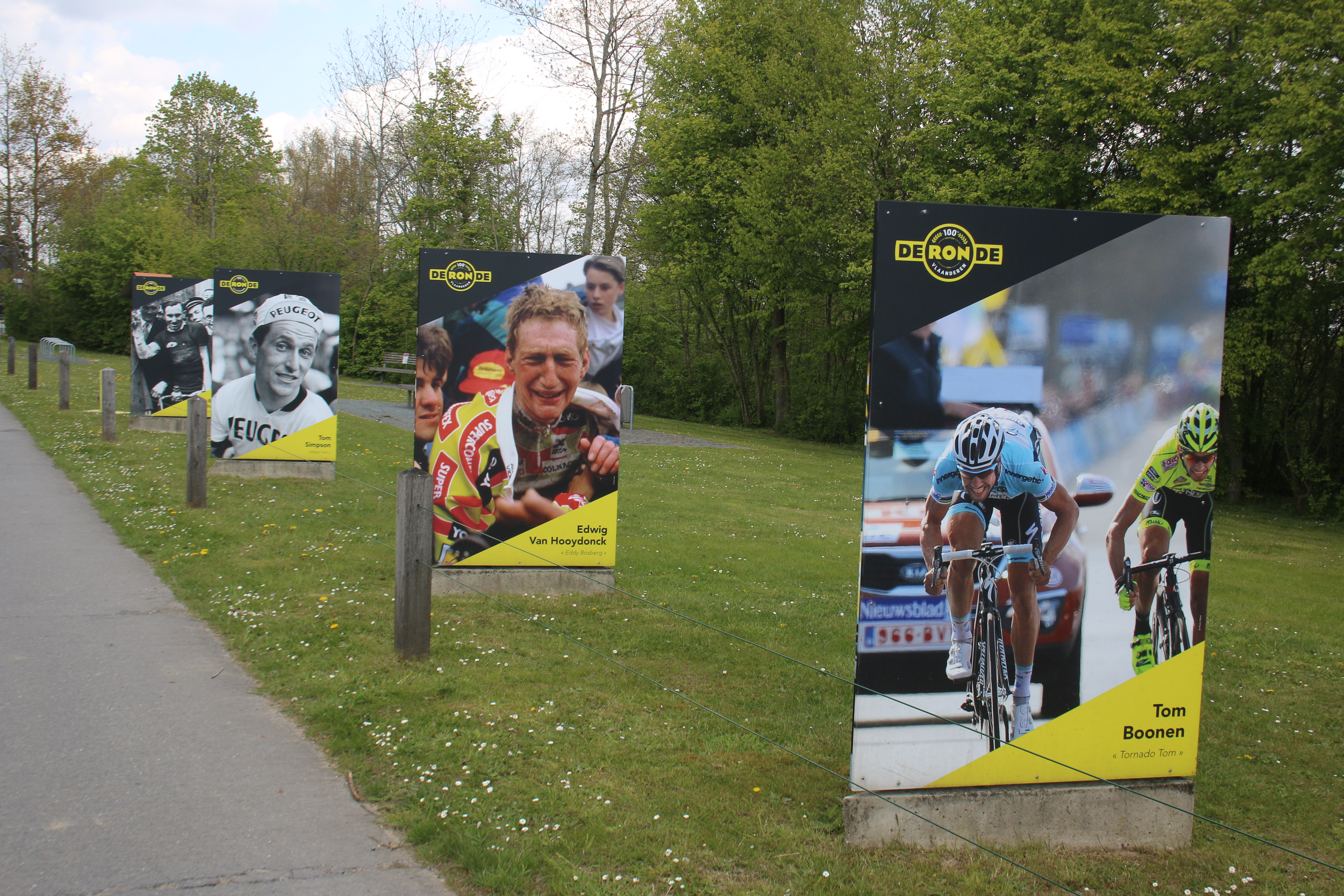
Ronde van Vlaanderenstraat in Kluisbergen with images of former winners Briek Schotte, Tom Simpson, Edwig van Hooydonck and Tom Boonen (2021)

Since 2017, the Tour of Flanders starts in the city of Antwerp. Following a flat run-in of 100 km (62 mi) during which the race passes the towns of Sint-Niklaas, Aalst, Zottegem, and passes the Paddestraat, the racers reach the town of Oudenaarde with the Centrum Ronde van Vlaanderen and shortly thereafter the village of Berchem, where the decisive part of the race starts.

Since 2012, the latter part of the race consists of three loops in the Flemish Ardennes with a finish in Oudenaarde. These take place in the southern part of East Flanders, with short forays into the provinces of West Flanders and Hainaut. These loops consist of a succession of hills (hellingen) and a few flat sections of cobbled roads, which determine the nature of the race. The hills offer many opportunities to attack and are usually the decisive sites of the race. These climbs are notorious for being short but very steep, and most, though not all, are cobbled.

Most of the climbs are located in a relatively small area, causing the roads to turn constantly and often abruptly, which explains the winding and irregular trajectory of the finale. The Oude Kwaremont is the first and longest climb at 2.2 km (1.4 mi): an atypical hill because it is not very steep, but considered one of the most arduous climbs in Flanders because of its length and cobbled surface. The steepest of all is the fully cobbled Koppenberg, 600 metres (2,000 ft) in length with grueling stretches of 22% over a poorly paved narrow road.

The last two climbs of the race, the Oude Kwaremont and the Paterberg, are both tackled twice in a finishing circuit. During the last loop, the Oude Kwaremont comes at 16 km (9.9 mi) from the finish and the Paterberg at 13 km (8.1 mi), often marking the decisive sites of the race. After the Paterberg comes a flat run-in towards the finish, totalling c. 265 km (165 mi).

=== Course changes ===
Like most of cycling's classics, the route has developed considerably over the years, but it has always been run in the provinces of East Flanders and West Flanders. In the first 30 years the race was run from Ghent to Ghent, although the location of the finish in Ghent changed every few years.

The first edition of 1913 headed eastward to Sint-Niklaas before following a clockwise circle through Aalst, Oudenaarde, Kortrijk, and Veurne all the way to the seashore in Ostend and via Roeselare back to Ghent. This course visited all the major cities of the two western provinces of Flanders. The course of 1914 was similar, but without the leg to the coast.

In 1919 the direction switched to a counter-clockwise course, turning south in Bruges. In 1920 the route extended to the coast again, heading out past Bruges to run along the North Sea from Blankenberge to Ostend. The general route remained this way until 1938. Race director Karel Van Wijnendaele insisted on including the coast to the course because of his sentimental vision of Flanders. (Note: Sentiment for the North Sea as a feature of Belgium is a familiar theme. The Belgian singer Jacques Brel (8 April 1929 – 9 October 1978) sang of "The Flat Country" in both French and Dutch. In French, the words refer to the vagues (waves) that mark the start of his vague (flat, merging with the sea) Belgium. For Van Wijnendaele the North Sea had extra significance because the whole of Belgium's coast is in Flanders.) The stretches of road along the sea were often accompanied by strong winds that inhibited attacks but scattered the peloton and spelled the end for those left behind the shelter of the main pack. "Turning left at the sea" meant that the wind blew from the side, producing a diagonal line of riders, each sheltering the other, typical of the Ronde and other Flemish races. (Note: In English the formation is known as an echelon. Despite that being a French word, the French term is "bordure". The Dutch is "waaier". Riders spread across the road in a staggered line, the rider most exposed to the wind riding there for a while to shelter the rest before crossing the road to join the other end of the line. In that way every rider takes a share of sheltering the others. There is great competition and often physical force to get into any echelon, but especially the front one in which the main contenders are likely to be riding.)

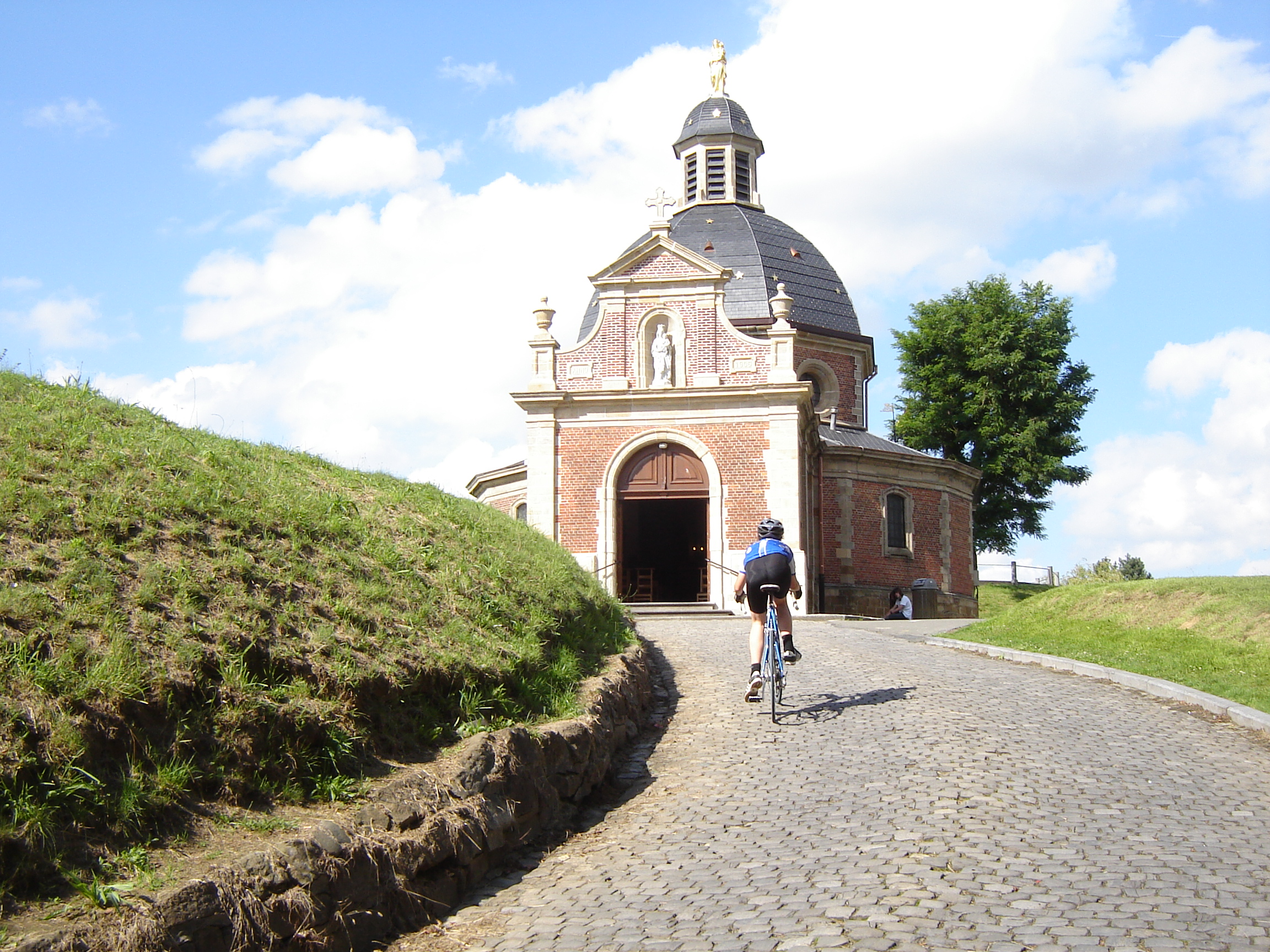
The Muur of Geraardsbergen, one of the emblematic locations of the race with the chapel on top, was re-included in 2017 after a five-year absence.

The passage along the coast was removed when war broke out in Europe, as access to the sea was restricted. The wartime route was a loop through the interior of Flanders, but in 1946 the race returned to its pre-war route. In 1952 the ride along the coast was abandoned for nine years, then returned in 1961, only to disappear again in 1964.

In 1973 the race had a new finish in Meerbeke, for the first time since its inception that the finish was outside the vicinity of Ghent. The race was no longer a loop and the new finish was much closer to the hill zone, offering opportunities to include new climbs in the course finale. The Muur van Geraardsbergen, with gradients touching 20% and its top at 16 km (9.9 mi) from the finish, was often the site where protagonists launched their decisive attacks. From 1973 to 2011, the Muur constituted a pairing with the Bosberg, the final climb at 11 km (6.8 mi) from the finish. The steep Muur in the center of Geraardsbergen, with its prominent chapel at the top, became one of the iconic sites of Belgian cycling and cycling in general.

In 1998 the start moved to Bruges, making a seaside passage possible again, but preserving the traditional finale over the Muur and Bosberg.

In 2012, the finish was changed to Oudenaarde, 30 km (19 mi) to the west of Geraardsbergen, thereby excluding both the Muur and Bosberg from the race course. The final climbs are since then Oude Kwaremont and Paterberg.

In 2017 the start was moved to Antwerp for the next five years and the Muur was placed back on the route, which still finished in Oudenaarde. It remained in the race in the 2018 edition, with the climb beginning 170 km (110 mi) into the race and finishing with 100 km (62 mi) remaining.

=== Start locations ===
The Tour of Flanders has started in four different cities – Ghent, Sint-Niklaas, Bruges and Antwerp. The start of the inaugural event in 1913 was on the Korenmarkt in Ghent's historic city center. Ghent, the largest city of East and West Flanders, hosted the 1913 World's Fair at the time of the race. Later, the official start in Ghent moved to the fashionable Albert Hotel, close to St-Pieters Station, where riders signed on. (Note: After the official start, the race was neutralized in the city center until Mariakerke.) Until the 1950s a Sunday Mass was held for riders before the start, as the race was often held just before the Holy Week or on Easter day.

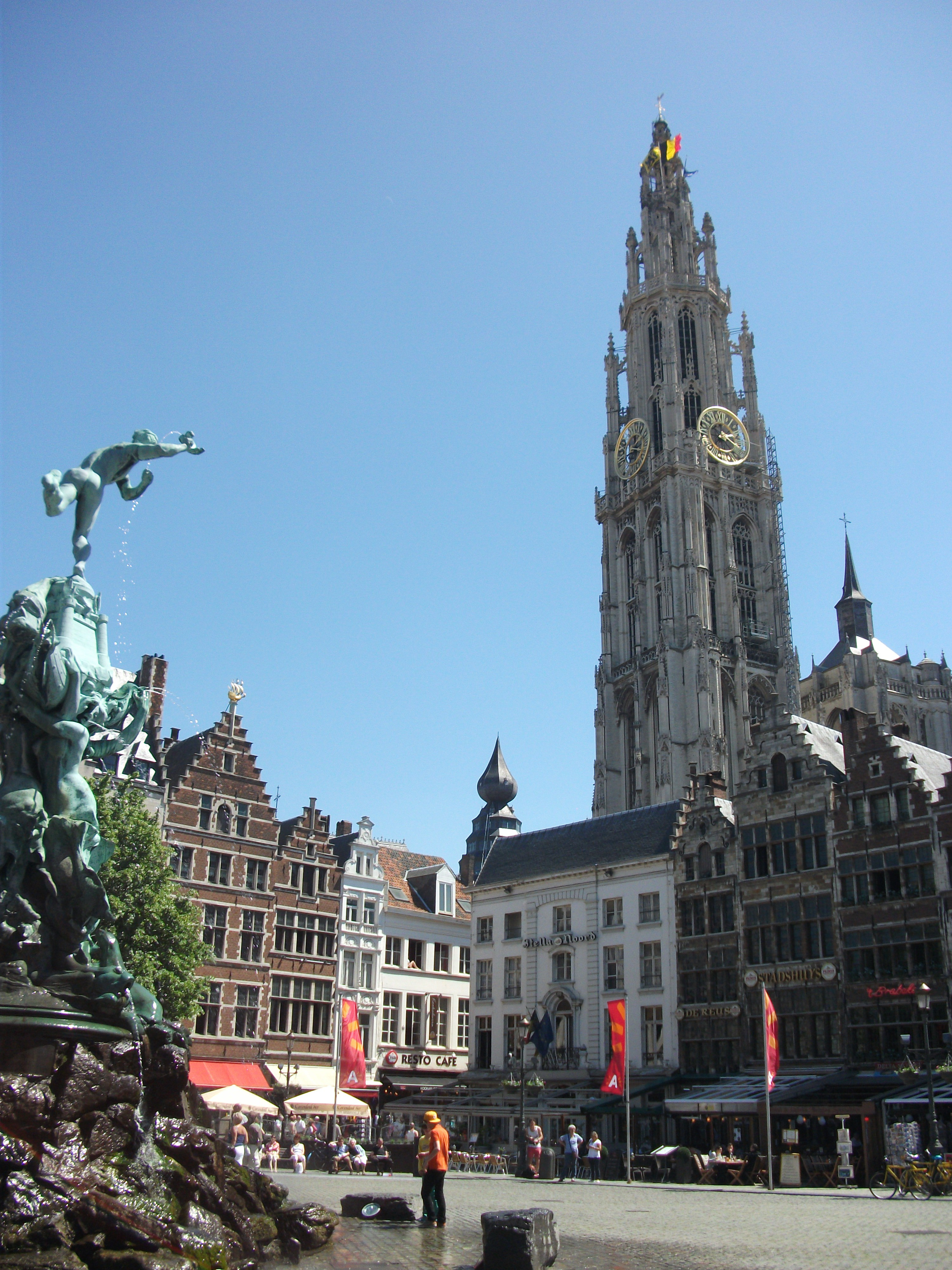
Antwerp has hosted the start of the race since 2017.

On the Square in St. Niklaas, at the foot of the magnificent city hall, the start of the Ronde was always a privileged moment. The riders gathered to sign their papers for the race before happily going to meet their fans, giving autographs, posing for a souvenir photograph with a young admirer. In that respect, times and customs have changed since 1998. [...] Now there are railings to hold the public back from mixing with the riders. The start of the Tour of Flanders has manifestly lost, in its new configuration, everything that made it charming.

— Journalist Fer Schroeders's critique of the move to Bruges in 1998.

In 1977 Sint-Niklaas replaced Ghent as the starting location of the race, mainly because it had more space to accommodate the growing number of spectators on its large market square. Race briefings were held in the monumental city hall. By 1988 the start had grown into a highly mediatized two-day event with a spectacle presented by Flemish television on the evening of the race.

In 1998 the start of the Tour of Flanders moved to Bruges, a UNESCO World Heritage Site known for its illustrious history and medieval architecture, as part of the city's promotional campaign. (Note: Bruges' campaign to bring the city to life, and not rely solely on historic tourism, went beyond cycling. It was one of the host cities of UEFA Euro 2000 and was the European Capital of Culture in 2002. Mayor Moenaert said he was delighted to host the start, which brought 15,000 people to Bruges and was broadcast to 16 countries with an audience estimated at 50 million.) The move from Sint-Niklaas to Bruges brought criticism unrelated to the route change. Until then it had been a tradition that spectators could mix and meet with riders before the start. Nonetheless, most Flemish fans and traditionalists were enthusiastic of the new starting place, praising Bruges' historic site and its closeness to the coast, which made it possible again for the race to pass by the seashore.

In 2017, the start of the race moved to Antwerp, Flanders' largest city. The move marked the first time the race passes through the province of Antwerp, as well as the first start outside the historical County of Flanders. The change was considered revolutionary, and the decision caused great division among Flemish cycling fans. After 6 years in Antwerp, the race will alternate starting locations between Antwerp and Bruges from the 2023 edition onwards.

=== Finish locations ===
The finish in 1913 was on the velodrome of Mariakerke, part of greater Ghent, but failed to have the aspired success. It moved in 1914 to the Deeske Porter velodrome in neighbouring Evergem where, Van Wijnendaele recounted tongue-in-cheek, "there were a good 20 spectators more than the previous year."

Wetteren hosted the finish from 1928 until 1961 with some interruptions during World War II, when it was moved to Ghent. Fiorenzo Magni won his three Tours of Flanders in Wetteren's city center. From 1962 to 1972 the finish was in a residential neighbourhood in nearby Gentbrugge, on the outskirts of Ghent.

From 1973 to 2011 the finish was in Meerbeke, part of the municipality of Ninove, some 20 km (12 mi) west of Brussels. For 39 years the race finished on the Halsesteenweg, with a finishing straight of 400 m (1,300 ft) going slightly uphill in the final meters.

In September 2011, it was announced that Oudenaarde would be the new host city to finish the Tour of Flanders, thereby ending a 39-year tradition of finishing in Meerbeke. The new arrival was part of a restyling of the race by new organiser Flanders Classics, which also saw the introduction of "loops" in the course. Many fans and followers were upset with the altered race finale, and the organisation's decision was met with resistance.

Start and finish:

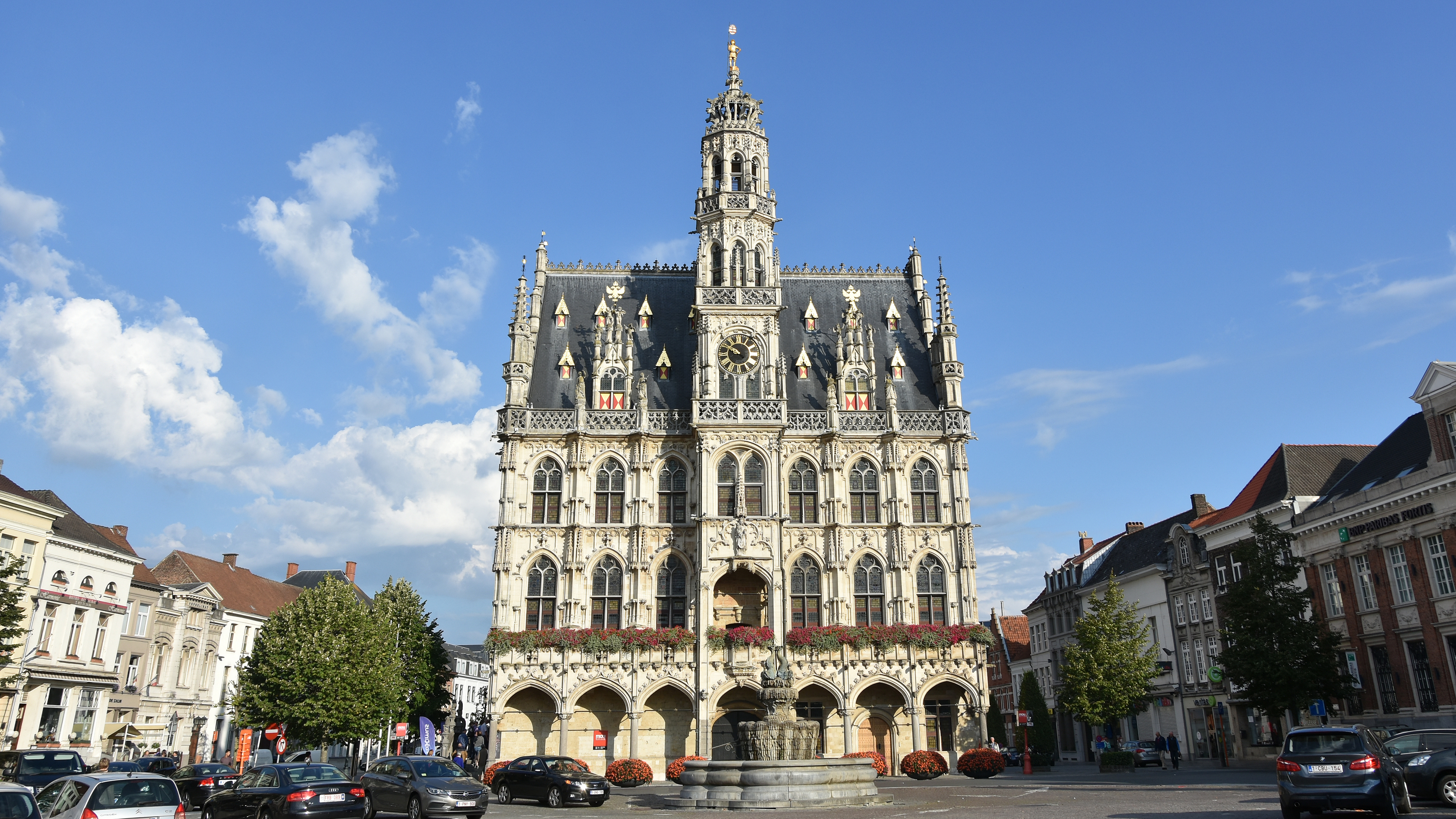
Oudenaarde has been the Tour of Flanders finish location since 2012

1913 Ghent – Mariakerke; 1914 Ghent – Evergem; 1919–1923 Ghent – Gentbrugge (Arsenal); 1924–1927 Ghent – Ghent velodrome (Citadelpark); 1928–1941 Ghent – Wetteren; 1942–1944 Ghent – Ghent velodrome (Citadelpark); 1945–1961 Ghent – Wetteren	1962–1972 Ghent – Gentbrugge; 1973–1976 Ghent – Meerbeke; 1977–1997 Sint-Niklaas – Meerbeke; 1998–2011 Bruges – Meerbeke; 2012–2016, 2023, 2025, 2027 Bruges – Oudenaarde; 2017–2022, 2024, 2026, 2028 Antwerp – Oudenaarde

== Race characteristics ==
=== Nature of the race ===
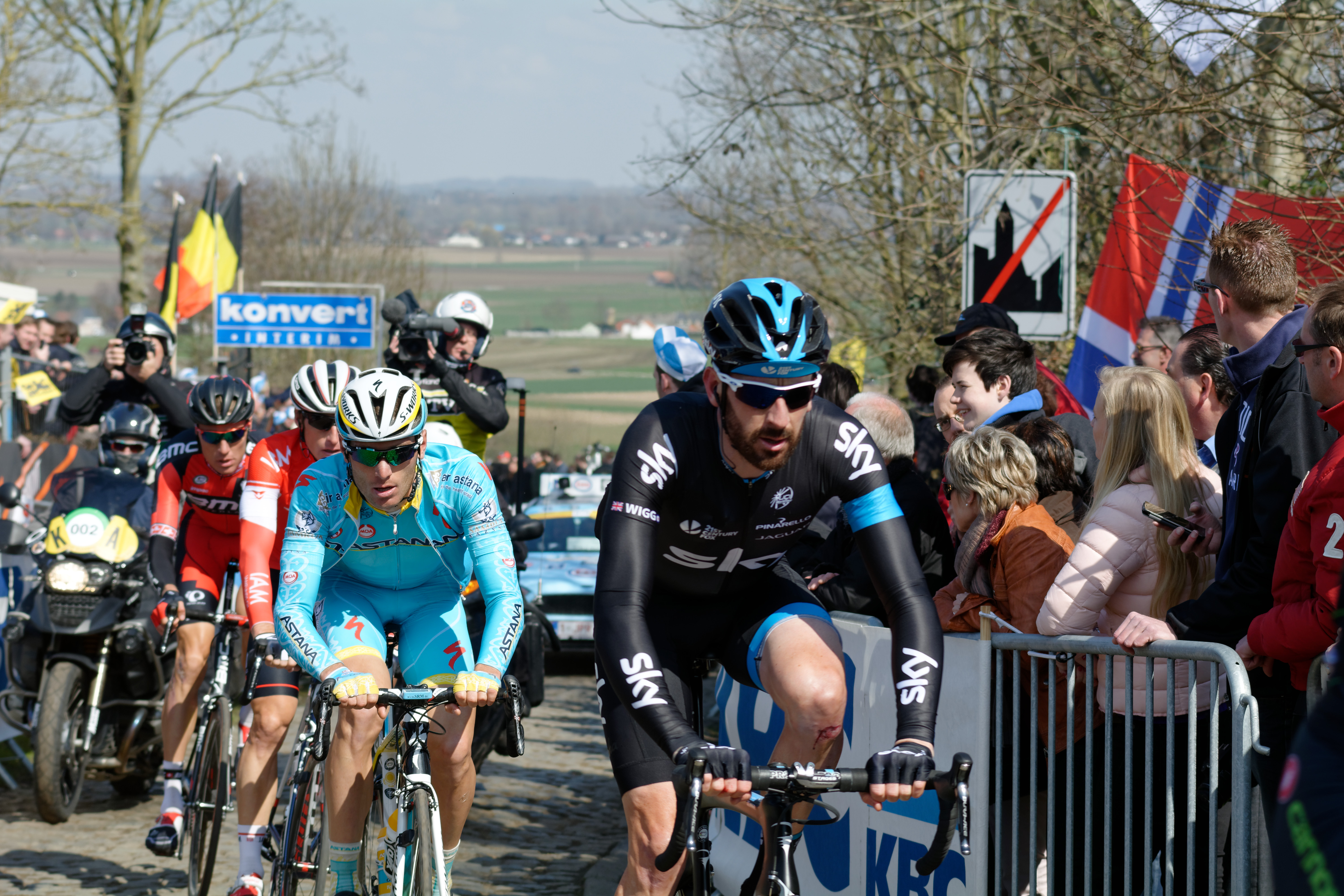
Bradley Wiggins leading a group on Oude Kwaremont in the 2015 race

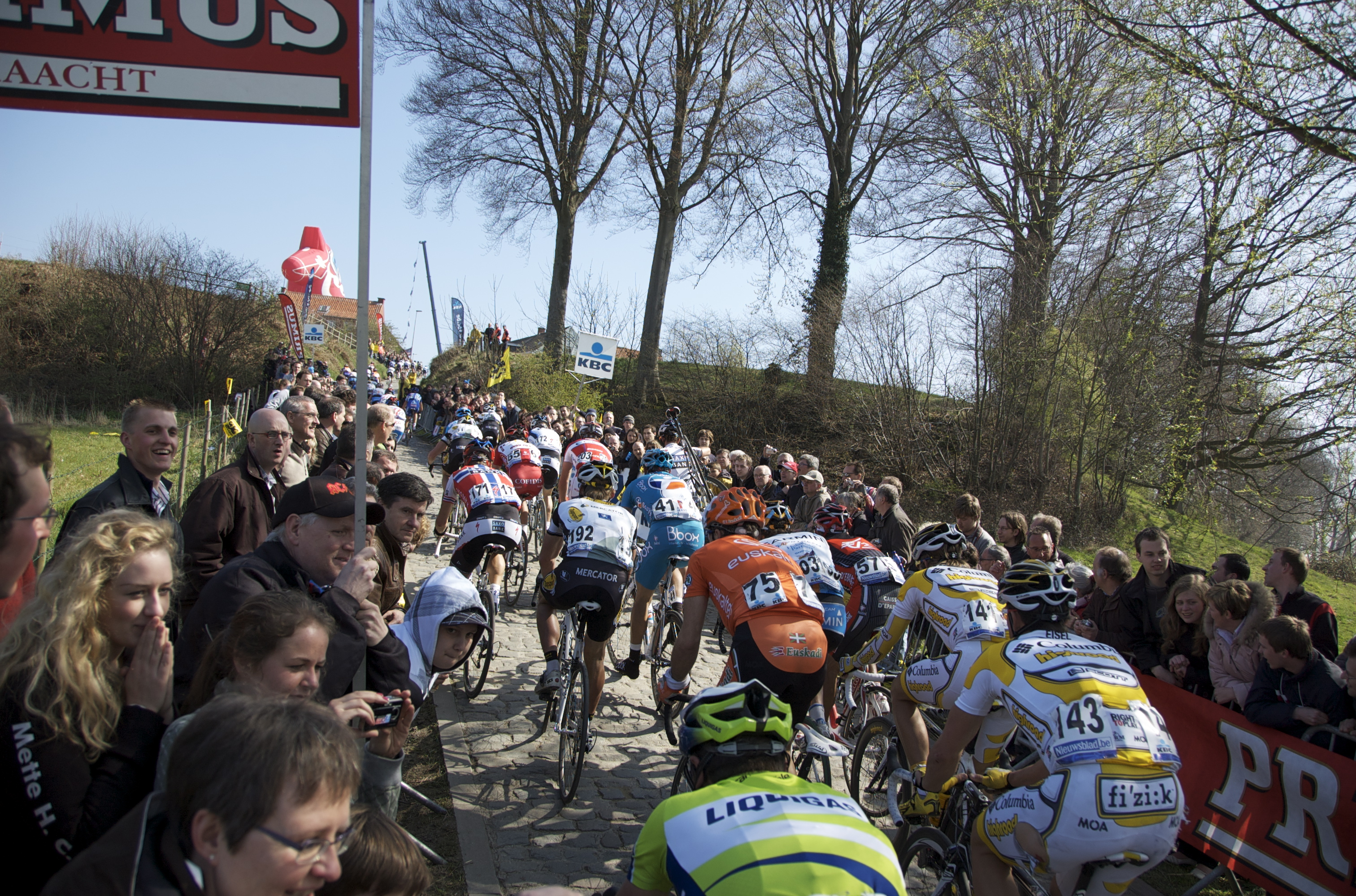
Peloton climbing the Koppenberg

The Tour of Flanders is known for being a strategic race, where race favourites have multiple opportunities of planning their decisive attacks. The tactical part of the race begins in the hilly region of the Flemish Ardennes, where teams and riders often have to react to unpredictable developments and shadow favourites make anticipatory moves.

The steep nature of these hills favours an aggressive, attacking style of riding, making the Tour of Flanders an attractive race for viewing audiences. The peloton often rushes furiously over the narrow roads towards the climbs as teams try to position their captains in the front of the group. A climb is usually followed by a bigger road for some recovery, before taking the next small roads and climb again.

As most hills are in rural locations or along small villages, the climbs themselves and the roads leading to them are often narrow, causing the peloton to stretch into a long line and frequently break into smaller groups. Consequently, the best riders are forced to continually fight for space at the front of the pack. The race is therefore both renowned and notorious for its nervous course, with some favourites falling behind early in the race because of a crash or puncture, often unable to return to the front of the race.

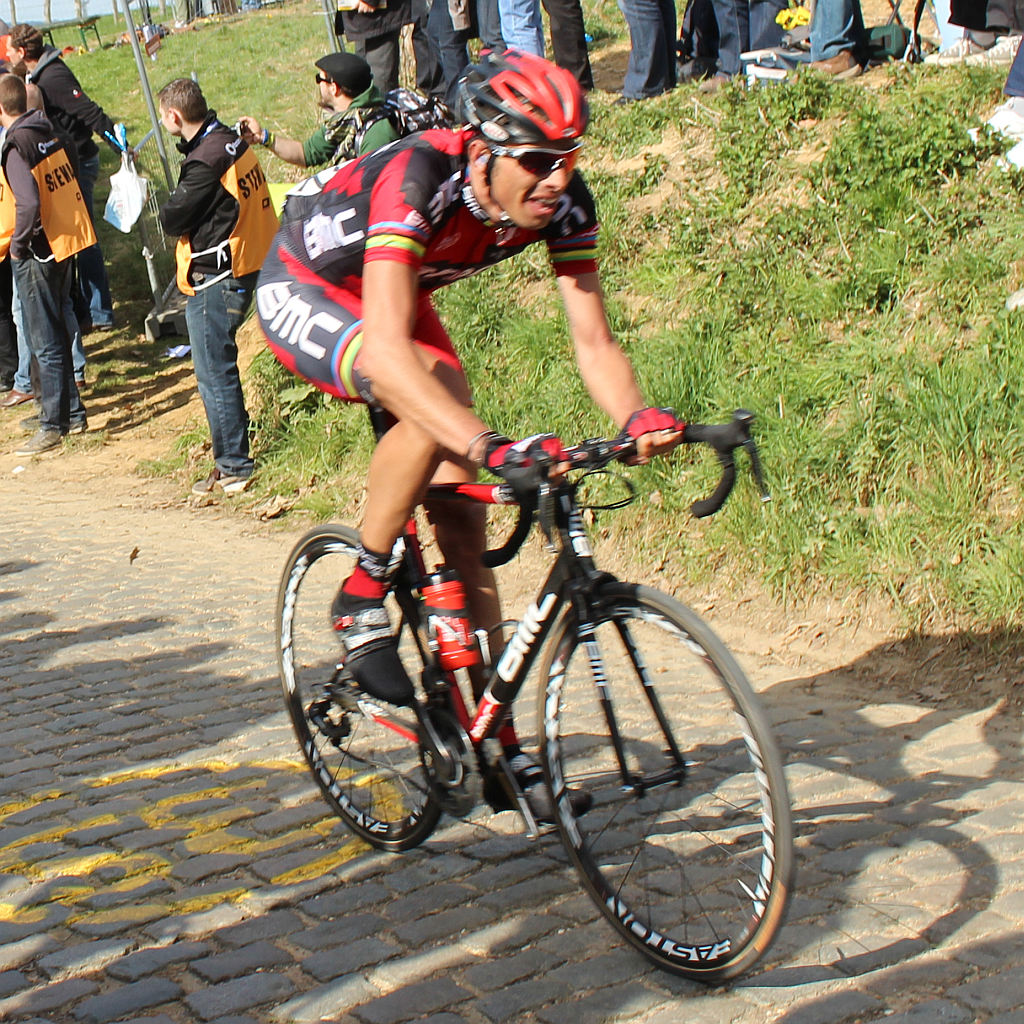
Alessandro Ballan in 2012

Since the race's restyling in 2012, the climbs of Oude Kwaremont, Paterberg and Koppenberg, just south of Oudenaarde, are the heart of the action. The Kwaremont is a long section of cobbles that starts sharply before gradually levelling out. It is the site where powerful riders often make the race-winning move, as Fabian Cancellara demonstrated in 2013, when he attacked with Peter Sagan on the lower slopes of Kwaremont before distancing the Slovak on the Paterberg. The Paterberg is the final climb of the day where fans create a carnival-like atmosphere. It is a short but cobbled climb and viciously steep. After 245 km (152 mi) of racing, it is generally an ultimate test of endurance and strength.

The race culture and primal competition is an identifying factor of the Tour of Flanders. Two-time winner Peter Van Petegem stated:

It doesn't really matter where it goes. You have cobblestones and climbs and small roads, and that provides the character of the race.

=== The climbs ===
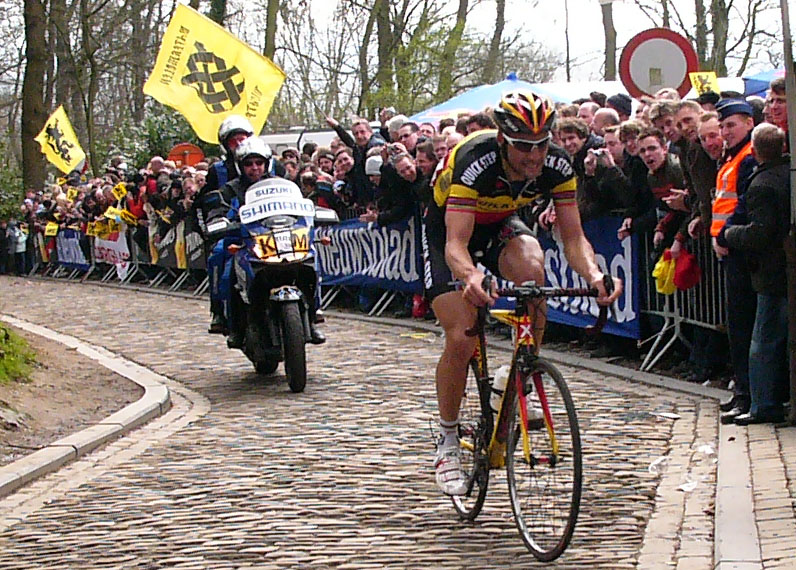
Tom Boonen in the 2010 race

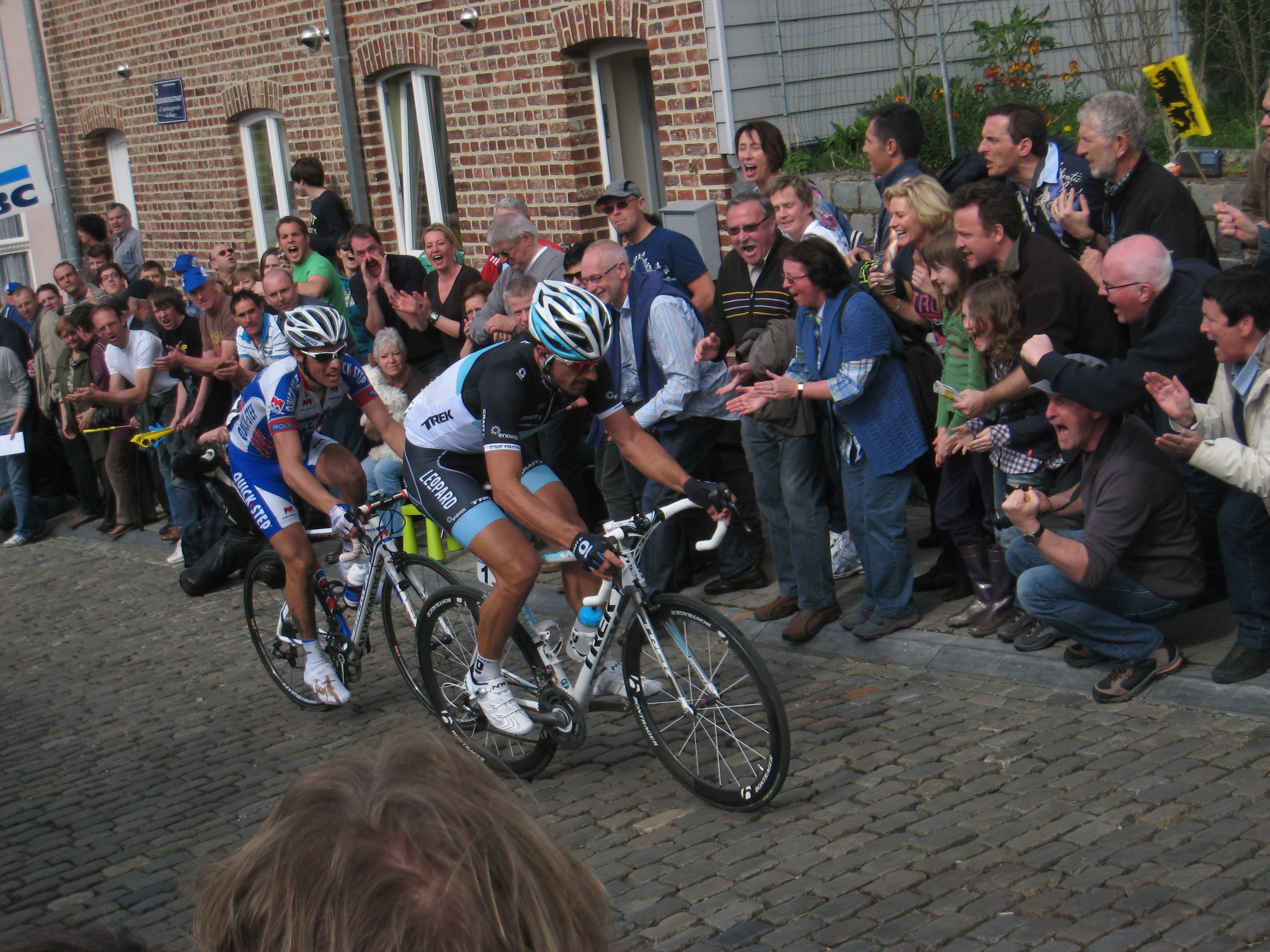
Fabian Cancellara and Sylvain Chavanel at the foot of the Muur in 2011

The short, sharp hills in the Flemish Ardennes are a defining feature of the Ronde and the places where spectators gather in vast numbers to see the race. In recent editions 17 to 19 of these hills are included in the route, although the number is subject to change as some climbs are cut and others included almost every year. Each climb has its own characteristics that present different challenges to the riders. The Kwaremont, is 2.2 km (1.4 mi) but relatively shallow. The Paterberg is short and, at 20 percent, brutally steep. The Koppenberg in Melden is the steepest hill of the race at 22 percent with a bad, very uneven cobbled surface. Its road is also extremely narrow and the high banking on either side turns it into a natural arena. Other famous climbs include the Eikenberg, Molenberg and Taaienberg.

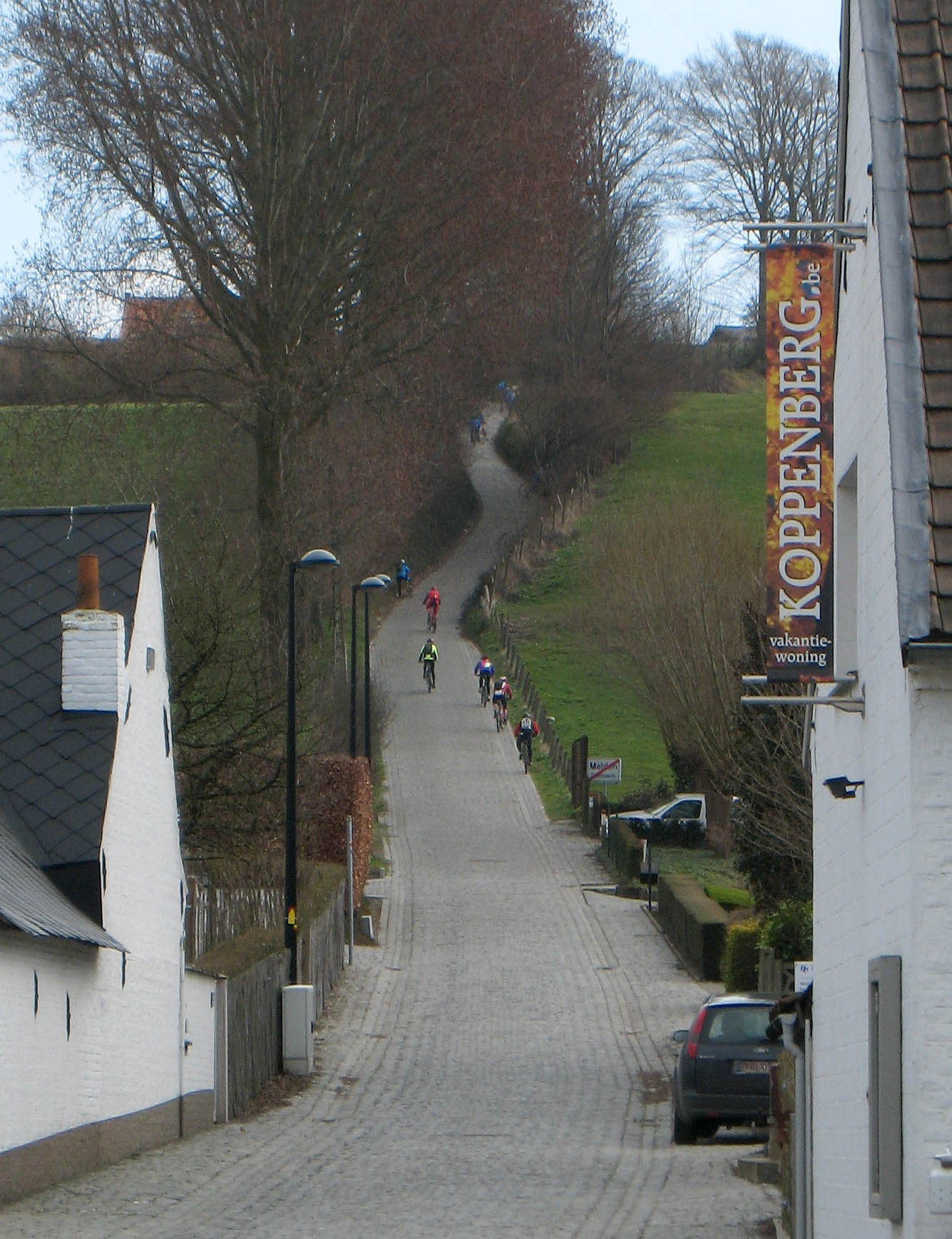
The Koppenberg seen from the foot in Melden

The Koppenberg has been dropped some years because it was deemed too difficult and too dangerous. Particularly when wet weather had made the cobbles slippery, it was hard for riders to take the steep slopes all the way riding. One rider falling could bring many others down and, in turn, halt those behind, who often had to shoulder their bikes and run up the remainder of the hill. In 1984 only two riders – Phil Anderson and Jan Raas – got to the top on their bikes. In 1987 Danish rider Jesper Skibby slipped and fell on the slick cobbles, before being run over by an official's car who tried to pass him. The climb was subsequently banned from the Tour of Flanders for the next 15 years.

The Koppenberg returned in 2002 after its surface was repaved. It was briefly dropped in 2007 but was included again in 2008 after the city of Oudenaarde had renovated it. It is now a permanent part of the course. Following cars are diverted before the foot of the climb to avoid chaos.

For more than half a century, organisers have offered prizes and bonuses to the first riders on many of the climbs. In 1940 the first rider up the Kwaremont, Edelare and Kruisberg won 500 francs. A combined prize for best climber on all the hills came in 1950, when Maurits Blomme won bedroom furniture. The prize at the top of the Kruisberg in 1953 was a washing machine; the first up the Muur of Geraardsbergen won 18,000 francs. In 1950 Fiorenzo Magni won 30,000 francs in bonuses during a long breakaway, in those days enough to buy a middle-class house. (Note: The primes, or intermediate bonuses, were of particular importance until the late 1960s, in an era when few professionals were paid by their team. Their expenses were often paid and they were given a bike but their income, in the absence of winning the race, depended on what they could pick up along the way. The result was that the hills acquired a financial, and consequently a strategic, importance which they have kept ever since.)

In 2015, the 19 climbs were:

Number	Name	Kilometer marker	pavement	Length (m)	Average climb (%)	Max (%)
1	Tiegemberg	177	asphalt	750	5,6%	9%
2	Oude Kwaremont	152	cobbles	2200	4,2%	11%
3	Kortekeer	141	asphalt	1000	6,4%	17,1%
4	Eikenberg	134	cobbles	1300	6,2%	11%
5	Wolvenberg	131	asphalt	666	6,8%	17,3%
6	Molenberg	118	cobbles	463	7%	14,2%
7	Leberg	97	asphalt	700	6,1%	14%
8	Berendries	93	asphalt	940	7,1%	12,4%
9	Valkenberg	88	asphalt	875	6%	15%
10	Kaperij	77	asphalt	1250	5%	8%
11	Kanarieberg	70	asphalt	1000	7,7%	14%
12	Oude Kwaremont	54	cobbles	2200	4,2%	11%
13	Paterberg (Note: The Paterberg is a road laid purposely for the race. A farmer, envious of a friend who lived beside the Koppenberg and saw the race pass at close quarters, laid out a new cobbled road in front of his house. He stated, in 1984, that he wanted the Ronde to cross his front yard. The road was finished in time for the 1986 edition.)	51	cobbles	400	12,5%	20%
14	Koppenberg	44	cobbles	600	11,6%	22%
15	Steenbeekdries	39	cobbles	820	7,6%	12,8%
16	Taaienberg	36	cobbles	800	7,1%	18%
17	Kruisberg	26	cobbles	1875	5%	9%
18	Oude Kwaremont	16	cobbles	2200	4,2%	12%
19	Paterberg	13	cobbles	400	12,5%	20%

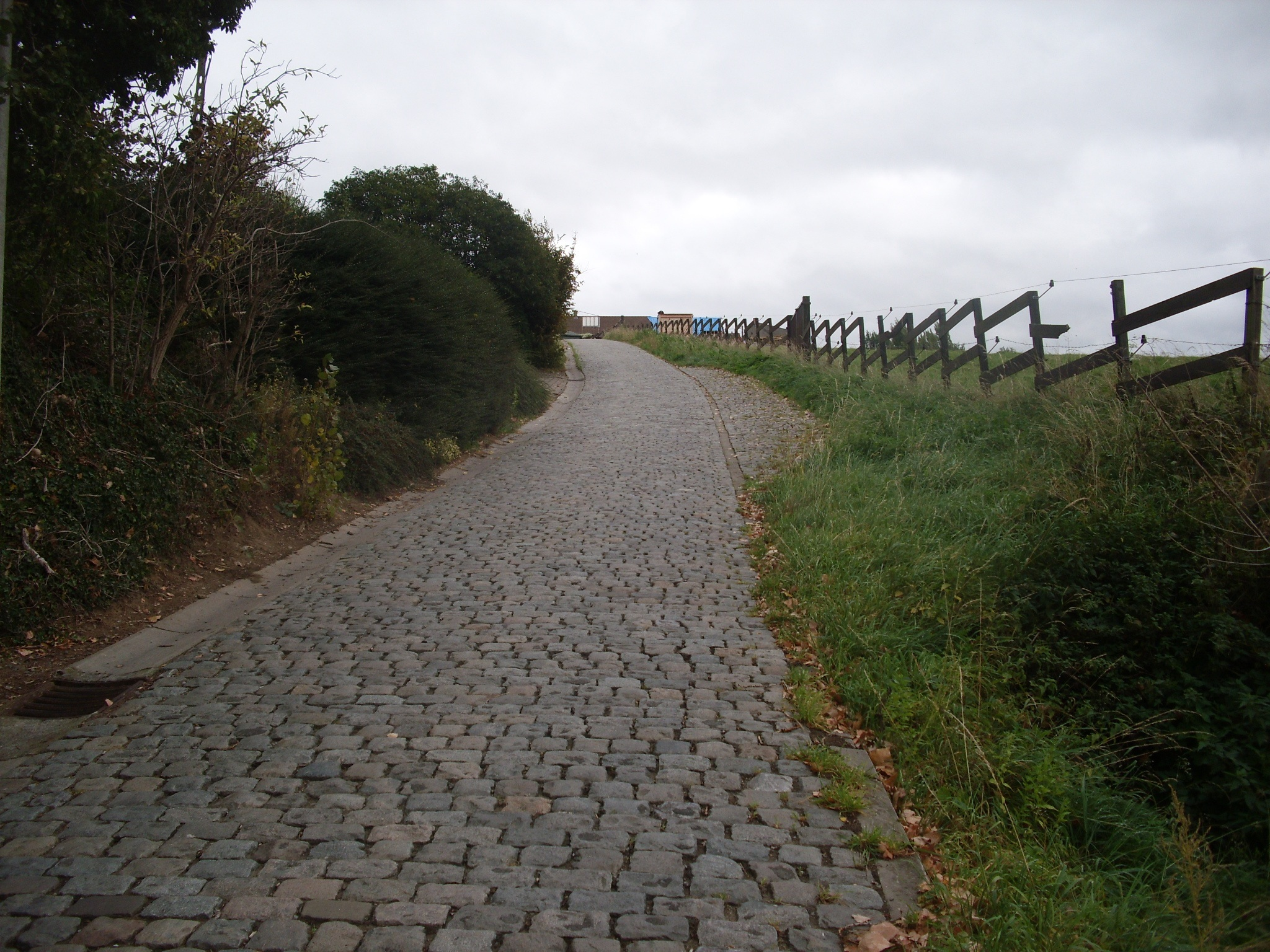
The steep slopes of the Paterberg in Kluisbergen

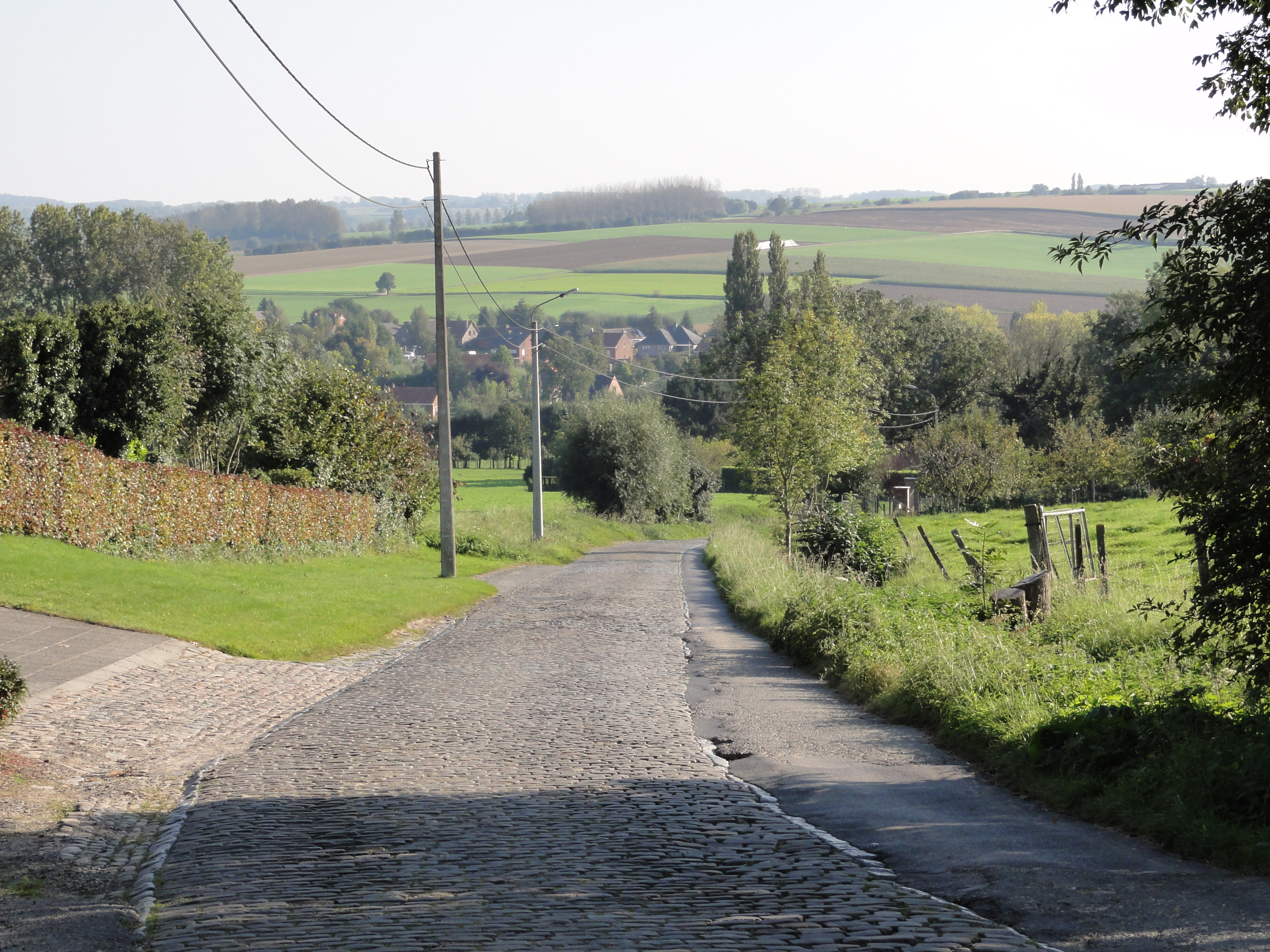
Eikenberg in Maarkedal

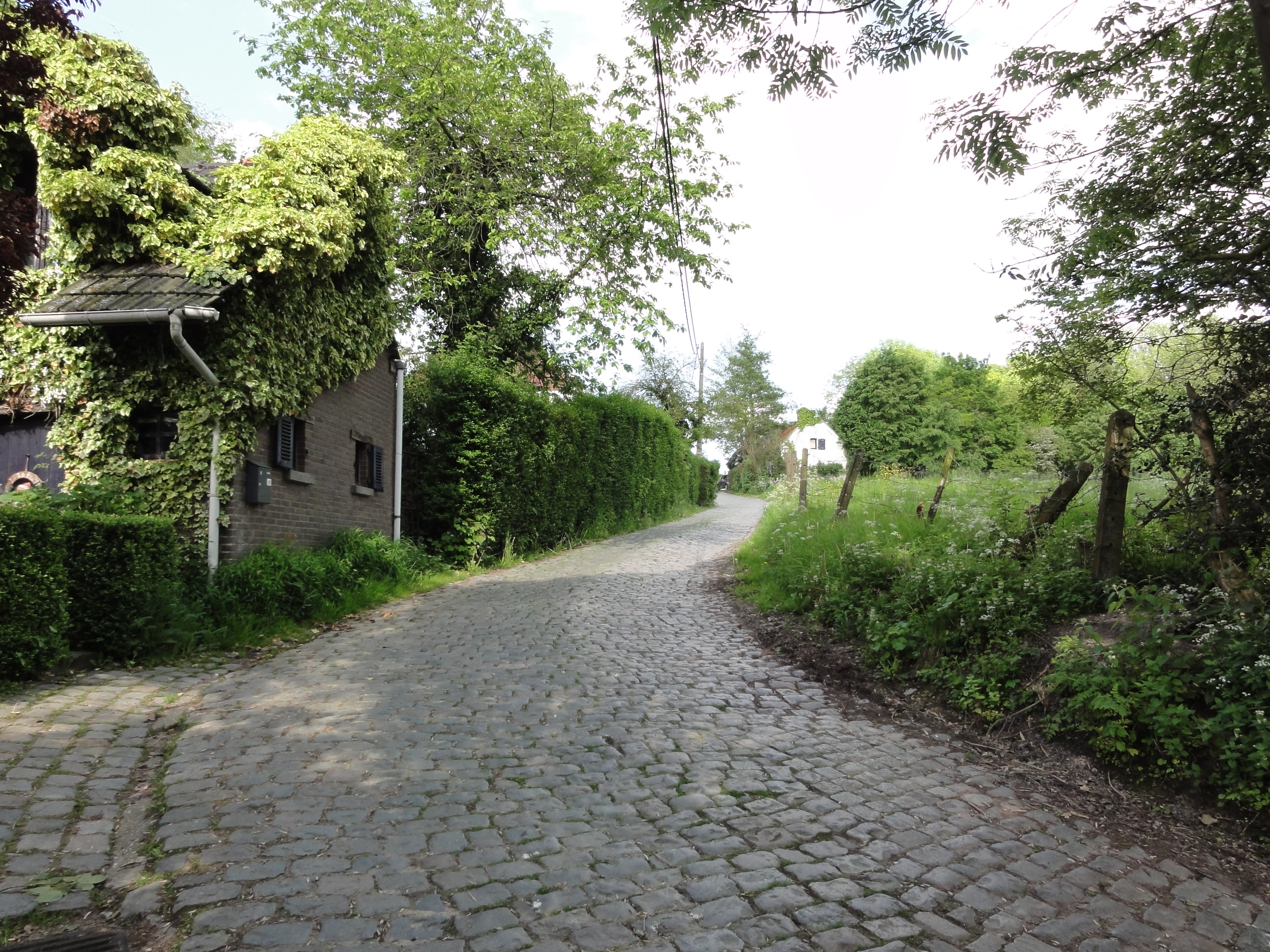
Scenic Molenberg in Zwalm

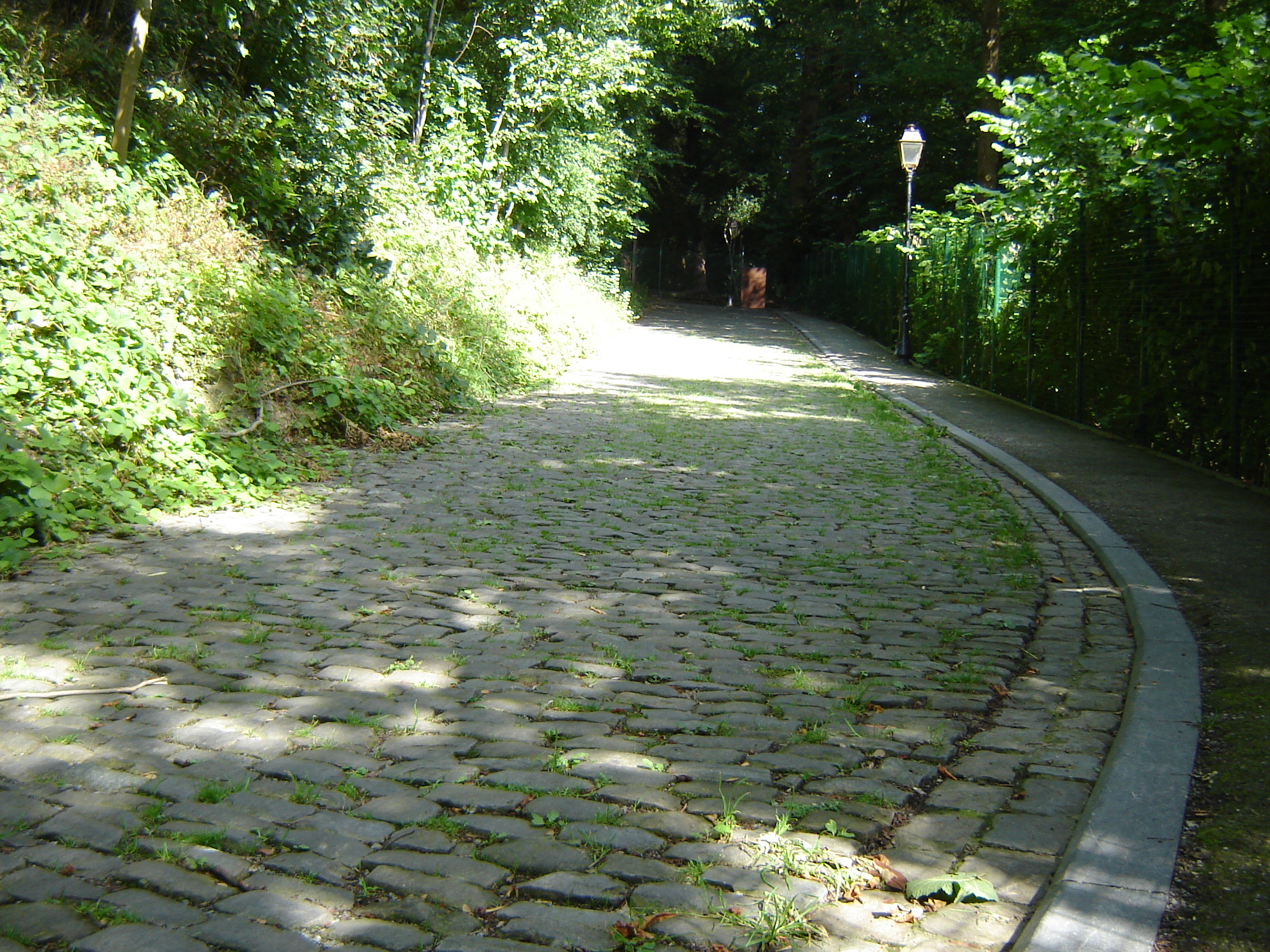
The steepest slopes of the Muur van Geraardsbergen at 20%

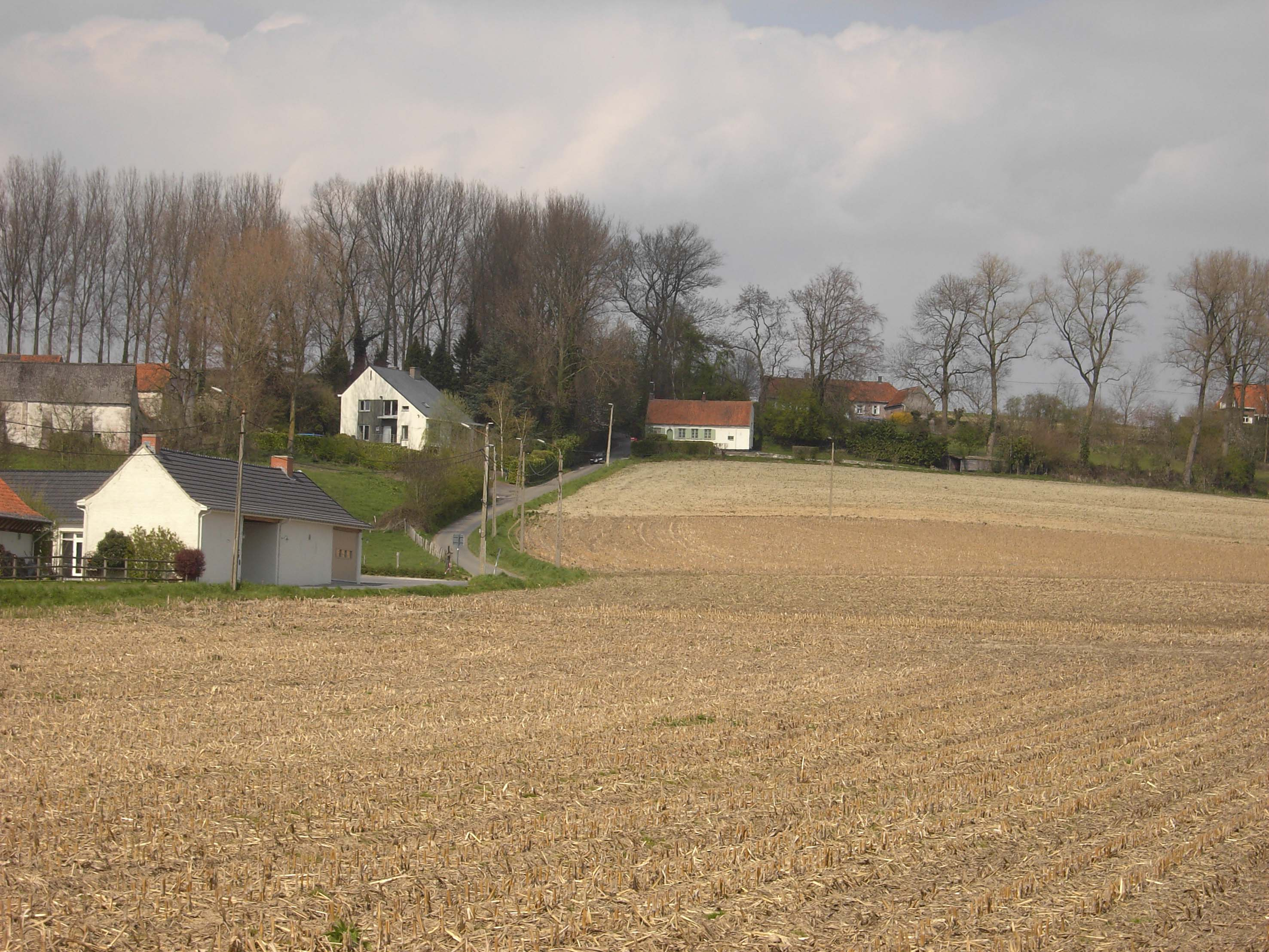
Ladeuze in Maarkedal

Climb statistics:

Kluisberg: Buissestraat, Bergstraat, Kluisbergen-Ruien. Climbs 66m from 27m to 93m. Maximum 11 per cent. First climbed 1955

Molenberg: Molenberg, Zwalm. Climbs 32m from 24m to 56m. Maximum 17 per cent. First climbed 1983.

Oude Kwaremont: Broekstraat, Kwaremontplein, Schilderstraat, Kluisbergen. Climbs 93m from 18m to 111m. Maximum 11 per cent. First climbed 1974.

Koppenberg: Steengat, Koppenberg, Oudenaarde-Melden. Climbs 64m from 13m to 77m; Maximum 25 per cent at inside of bend, otherwise 22 per cent. First climbed 1976.

Taaienberg: Taaienberg, Maarkedal-Etikhove. Climbs 45m from 37m to 82m. Maximum 18 per cent. First climbed 1974.

Berg ter Stene: Stene, Horebeke. Climbs 68m from 32m to 100m. Maximum 9 per cent. First climbed 1957

Leberg: Leberg, Brakel-Zegelsem. Climbs 39m from 60m to 9m. Maximum 15 per cent. First climbed 1977

Berendries: Berendries, Brakel-Sint-Maria-Oudenhove. Climbs 65m from 33m to 98m. Maximum 14 per cent. First climbed 1983

Valkenberg: Valkenbergstraat, Brakel-Nederbrakel. Climbs 53m from 45m to 98m. Maximum 15 per cent. First climbed 1959

Muur-Kapelmuur: Abdijstraat, Ouderbergstraat, Oudeberg, Geraardsbergen. Climbs 77m from 33m to 110m. Maximum 20 per cent. First climbed 1950

Bosberg: Kapellestraat, Geraardsbergen-Moerbeke. Climbs 40m from 65m to 105m. Maximum 11 per cent. First climbed 1975.

Tenbosse: Olifantstraat, Brakel. Climbs 28m from 45m to 73m. Maximum 14 per cent. First climbed 1997

=== Cobbled roads ===
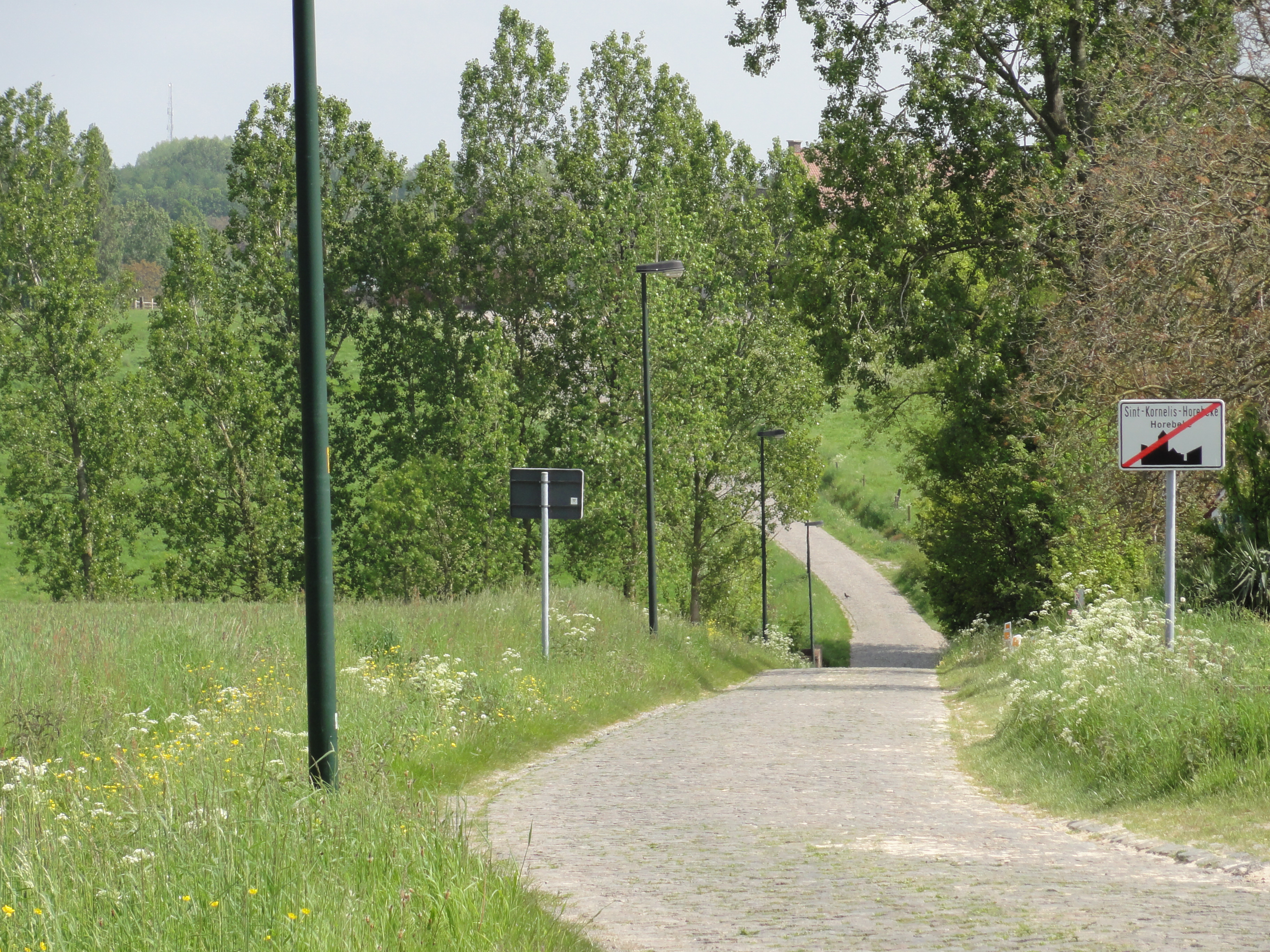
Winding Haaghoek cobbled road in Sint-Kornelis-Horebeke

Additional to the hills, the course traditionally includes a number of flat sections of cobbled roads. Recent editions included the Paddestraat (2400m), Mater-Kerkgate (3000m), Haaghoek (2000m) and Mariaborrestraat (2400m). Only the Mariaborrestraat comes in the race finale, as it also comprises the climbs of the Steenbeekdries and the descent of the Stationsberg. Unlike the fearful sections of pavé in Paris–Roubaix, these roads are in excellent condition nowadays as they are part of a busy traffic network. They haven't been the decisive sites of the race for decades, but many "purists" of the Tour of Flanders want to keep them included because of their value as symbols of Flemish landscapes.

Until the 1950s the many dirt roads and cobbled roads were crucial sites in the race. Historian Tom Van Laere states that the Tour of Flanders had never set out to use poor roads – cobblestoned roads were all that were available if the race were to be long enough. In the Interwar period, Belgium's infrastructure was severely scarred by war and only the intercity roads were smooth. Roads were laid in cobblestones, simply because it was the cheapest material at the time. After the Second World War, Belgium picked itself up from devastation and provinces began asphalting roads.

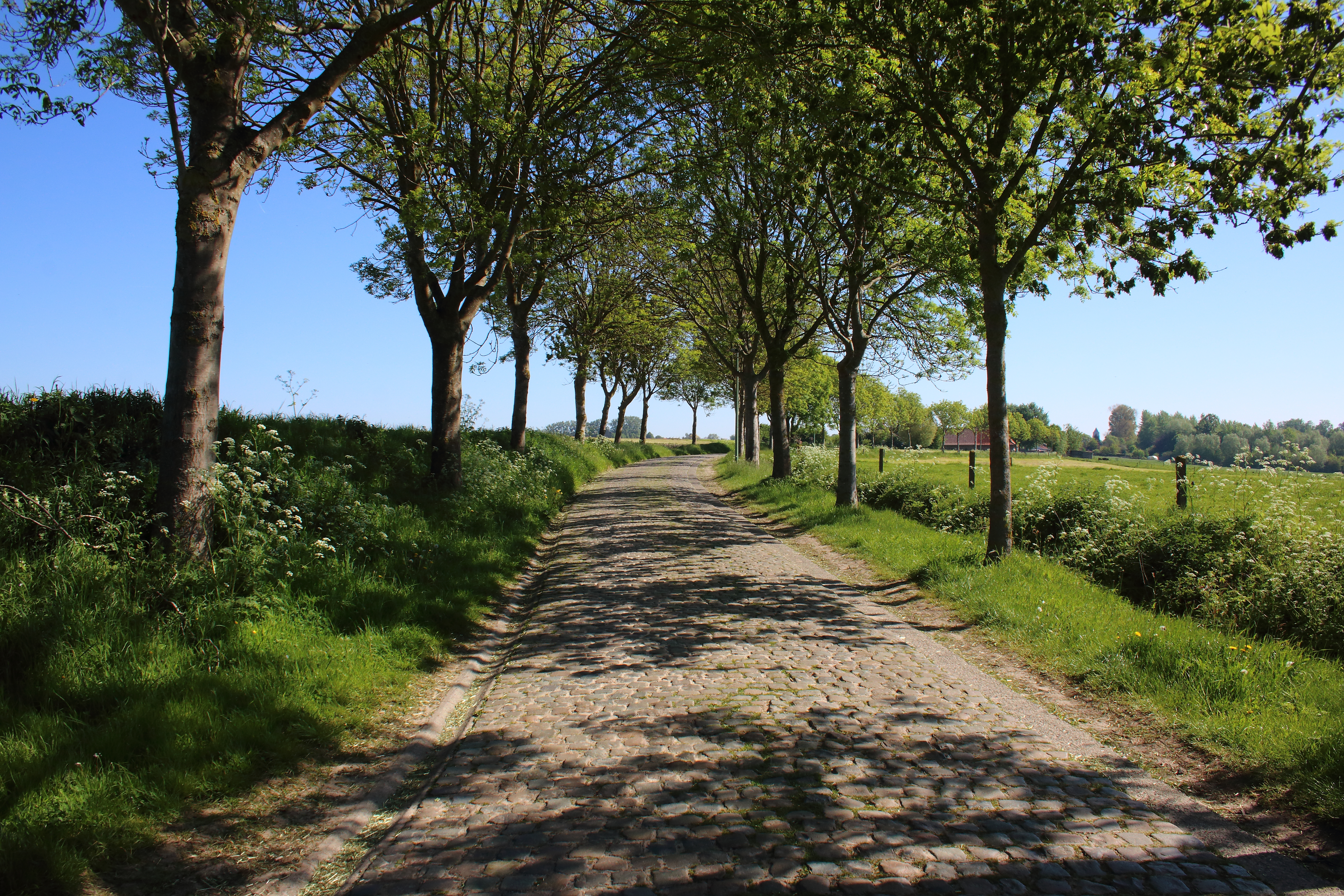
Classified Paddestraat in Velzeke

When some of the iconic hills were asphalted, cycling fans and organizers were alarmed by the disappearance of cobbles. Organizer Van Wijnendaele could no longer rely on many of the traditional roads as they were not difficult enough. His staff began searching for alleys and footpaths in maps and talked to people in bars who knew the local roads. "It was either that or risk the race ending in a mass sprint, and that's the last thing organizers wanted," said Van Laere. Most back roads happened to be in the low hills between Ronse and Geraardsbergen, the region that became the heart of the race.

Over the years the mileage of cobbles decreased but the number of cobbled hills rose. The climb of the Paterberg was unpaved until 1986, when its cycling-mad owner paved the road in cobbles because he wanted the race to pass by his house. The site was immediately included by race organizers and has become a fixture in the course.

Several of the remaining cobbled roads in Flanders, including the Paterberg, are now protected sites and classified as part of Flemish cultural heritage.

=== Weather ===
As with most cycling races, weather conditions have a significant influence in the nature of the day's race. In bad weather conditions, the race is often a gruelling contest and the peloton is thinned out in the early parts of the race. In modern times, the edition of 1985 was hit by exceptionally stormy weather and only saw 24 finishers. When weather conditions are good, the teams of race favourites can control the race more easily and more riders are able to keep up with the pace. As the weather in April is highly unpredictable in Flanders, the race has repeatedly been affected by rough weather conditions.

So much the better when bad weather is predicted for the Tour of Flanders. In rain, wind and mud she thrives best.

— Race founder Karel Van Wijnendaele, keen on dramatizing the nature of the race.

Founder Karel Van Wijnendaele was keen on bad weather. He wanted the Tour of Flanders to be a symbol of Flemish culture and a metaphor of the country. As a journalist, he romanticized the race's protagonists in the image of the Flemish people of the time: hard-working, struggling men in a constant battle with the elements. His rhetoric, combined with often harsh conditions, contributed to the image of the Tour of Flanders as a character race where only the most headstrong and physically robust could win.

== Rider characteristics ==
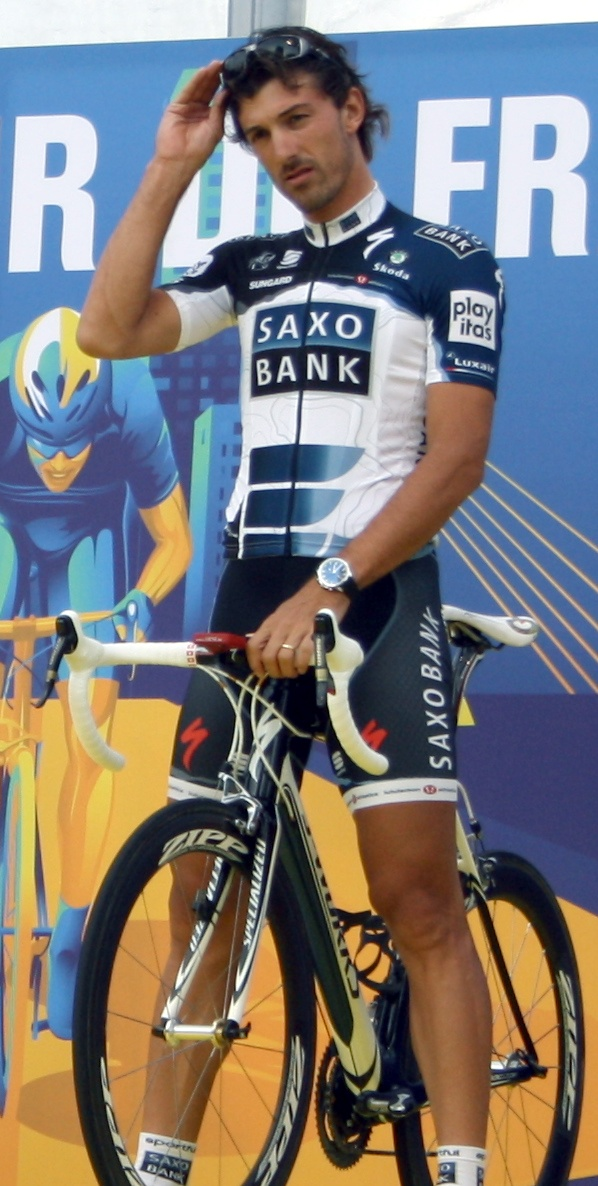
Time trial specialist Fabian Cancellara won three times

Since the early years, winners of the Tour of Flanders acquired the literary epithet Flandrien or Flahute – a French term eagerly used by the Flemish press. Flandriens were known as riders with a formidable durability who were able to ride fast all day, over vast distances and in all weathers. Their exploits helped cement bike racing as the foremost sport in Flanders.

Because of its demanding course and specific characteristics, the Tour of Flanders has favoured a certain type of cyclists in modern times, known as classics specialists or specialists of the cobbled classics. Main contenders must possess a broad range of athletic potential in order to win. The aggressive nature of the climbs favours explosive riders, but the length of the race requires the highest level of fitness and durability.

Although the race has never ended in a mass sprint, sprinters often do well, especially those who evolved into classic riders, like Tom Boonen or Alexander Kristoff. Time trial specialist Fabian Cancellara successfully focused on the cobbled classics, thereby using his ability to maintain a high pace as a strong weapon on the last hills and on the flat run-in to the finish. Cancellara finished solo on two of his three wins.

Many recent top-placed finishers of the cobbled classics share the same physical attributes. Record winners Johan Museeuw [186 cm (6 ft 1 in) and 79 kg (174 lb)], Tom Boonen [192 cm (6 ft 3 1/2 in) and 82 kg (181 lb)] and Fabian Cancellara [186 cm (6 ft 1 in) and 81 kg (179 lb)], totalling nine combined victories, are all powerful riders and among the "heavier" types of cyclists. 2015 Norwegian winner and classics specialist Alexander Kristoff is in the same range at 181 cm and 78 kg., while recent three times winner Mathieu van der Poel is [184 cm (6 ft 1/2 in) and 75 kg (165 lb)]

These physical features are not absolute however. Three times winner Tadej Pogačar [176 cm (5 ft 9 1/2 in) and 66 kg (146 lb)], Two-times winner Peter Van Petegem [176 cm (5 ft 9 1/2 in) and 72 kg (159 lb)] and 2011 winner Nick Nuyens [177 cm (5 ft 9 1/2 in) and 68 kg (150 lb)] were noticeably smaller riders.

== Notable editions ==
=== 1919: Van Lerberghe's speech ===
Gabe Konrad writes: "The 1919 winner, van Lerberghe, showed up on the line in full racing attire but, for some reason, without a bike. He borrowed one from the brother-in-law of another competitor and, prior to the starting gun, threatened the pack that he was going to drop them all at their own front doors on the way to victory. Van Lerberghe hadn't had, and would never have, an impressive career, and all the cyclists laughed as he pulled away immediately – never to be caught. Just prior to entering the velodrome for the finish, van Lerberghe stopped off at a pub to take in a few beers. His manager, worrying that he would miss a chance at victory, had to track him down and get him back on the bike. After he had crossed the line and done his lap of honour, van Lerberghe stood in front of the crowd and, in all seriousness, told them 'to go home; I'm half a day ahead of the field.'" (Note: Ritten van Lerberghe's victory speech was reported in dialect, presumably to reflect his manner of speech, as "Gaat nu ollemoale nar huz weijje. En komt morgen achternoene were, 'k lig nen halven dag vorut." Van Wijnendaele wrote occasionally in dialect and frequently in a distinctive style of Dutch that emphasised his peasant origins and the way the language had developed differently from in the neighbouring Netherlands.)

=== 1939: Kaers' training ride ===
Karel Kaers, the youngest man to win the world road championship, also won the Ronde in 1939 – without intending to. For him, it was training for Paris–Roubaix. He drove to the Kwaremont hill near Kluisbergen, parked his car, then rode 40 km (25 mi) to the start in Ghent. His plan was to ride round the course with his usual training partner, stop when he got to his car, then drive home. Knowing he wasn't riding the whole distance, Kaers jumped clear of the field – again as training – and rode up the Kwaremont with a minute's lead. But his car wasn't there. He pressed on instead and won the race. His manager had driven the car away to save Kaers from temptation.

=== 1944: Van Steenbergen's lucky day ===
Rik Van Steenbergen said: "When I turned pro, I couldn't ride it straight away. There were three categories of rider: road-riders A, road-riders B, and track riders. I was registered with the federation as a track rider. At first they wouldn't let me ride the national championship. But Jean van Buggenhout, the manager, got me reclassified on the Wednesday before the race. I won it and became an 'A' rider. Then I could start the year in the Tour of Flanders. I was 19 and I'll probably stay the youngest person ever to win." Van Steenbergen was in the break when several riders fell on the cinder track to the track in Ghent. Van Steenbergen rode round the fallen and won. Next year he decided not to ride. Van Wijnendaele was offended. But Van Steenbergen had realised why he'd turned pro: to make a living. "I could probably win more money elsewhere," he said. "The Tour of Flanders didn't have the attraction that it does now, especially not internationally."

=== 1946: Van Steenbergen again ===
Van Steenbergen returned in 1946 and won again. He said: "That was one of my best wins ever. I could do whatever I liked, ride better than anyone. In the end I was with Briek Schotte and Enkel Thiétard. They were happy just to follow me. We made an agreement. I said that they could stay with me until we got to Kwatrecht. I wouldn't drop them provided they'd do their best to work with me. They were happy with that. They didn't have a choice. Under the bridge at Kwatrecht I just got rid of them."

=== 1951: Magni's festival ===
Fiorenzo Magni, a rare Italian in Belgian classics, won so many intermediate prizes during his long solo flight that they would have bought him a house (see above). He was one of nine to escape the field at Ingelmunster. The others cracked one by one until Magni was alone by Strijpen – the point where he made his winning move the previous year. He rode the last 75 km (47 mi) alone to win the Ronde for the third successive year. Magni won by almost eight minutes and the first five finishers were foreigners.

=== 1961: Simpson vs. Defilippis ===
Such a gale blew in 1961 that the banner over the finish line blew down. The British rider Tom Simpson was clear with the better-known Italian champion, Nino Defilippis. Simpson, the weaker sprinter, accelerated for the line with a kilometre to go. It was too far and Defilipis came past him as he weakened. Simpson struggled to stay with him and was delighted when the Italian began freewheeling just before the finish. Defilippis said he didn't know where the finish was because the banner had blown down, but the two riders had already covered two previous laps of the finishing circuit. For the same reason, the Italian protest that the line on the road wasn't clearly marked also failed. Defilippis asked Simpson to agree to a tie, saying no Italian had won a classic since 1953. Simpson said:

"I replied that an Englishman had not won one since 1896!"

=== 1969: Merckx' panache ===
Eddy Merckx dominated world racing in both classics and stage races but couldn't win the Ronde. By 1969 he had not only frustration to contend with but rising resentment of other riders unhappy that he won so many races. He attacked early and half the field never saw him again. The other half was reduced with each successive attack until he got clear alone. The chase was furious but ineffective and Merckx won by more than five and a half minutes over Felice Gimondi and more than eight minutes on the rest. The Ronde remained an unhappy race for him; it was another six years before he won again.

=== 1985: Vanderaerden in the storm ===
Bad weather has often hit the Ronde. In 1985, a storm broke in the second half of the race. The weather was so bad that only 24 made it to the finish. The race historian, Rik Vanwalleghem, said: "It was a legendary Ronde, one which wrote Sport with a capital S. It was as cold as Siberia all day and the rain fell in torrents (regende het pijpenstelen) [...] In this apocalyptic background Eric Vanderaerden got back to the front after looking beaten to ride 20 km (12 mi) at the head of the race alone. Impressive."

=== 1987: Skibby on the Koppenberg ===
The danger of the Ronde's narrow and badly surfaced hills came close to tragedy when Danish rider Jesper Skibby was hit from behind by an official's car and fell onto a roadside bank, still strapped into his pedals. The official's car then tried to pass him and ran over Skibby's back wheel, narrowly missing his leg. The race official continued to the finish, where he was met by angry spectators throwing mud, cups and stones at his car. The incident overshadowed the victory of Claude Criquielion, the first French-speaking Belgian winner of the Tour of Flanders.

== Opinions ==
- "Only those who are in top condition can say that the Ronde is not hard. For everyone else, it's the Way of the Cross." – Andrea Tafi
- "I told the organisers it wasn't a race but a war game. It's hard to explain what the Koppenberg means to a racing cyclist. Instead of being a race, it's a lottery. Only the first five or six riders have any chance: the rest fall off or scramble up as best they can. What on earth have we done to send us to hell now?" – Bernard Hinault
- "As a Belgian, winning Flanders for the first time is far more important than wearing the maillot jaune [yellow jersey] in the Tour" – Johan Museeuw
- "Looking back, you get a bit nostalgic, but from a competitive point of view, Flanders was one of the most horrible races to ride but one of the greatest races to win." – Sean Kelly
- "Many great names of Flemish cycling live on the route of the race. This closeness doesn't exist in any other country. That's what gives our identity." – Nico Mattan
- "These days, you see all the riders, their life is well known. Before, you saw only the last two hours on television. Now, the direct coverage starts before the race has started and the legend that surrounded riders, created in people's imagination, no longer exists. When everything is too realistic, you lose the legend." – Marc Sergeant
- "The Tour of Flanders is unlike any other bike race in the world. It is, without question, the hardest one-day bike race ever created. What seems like a million corners, combined with twenty to thirty steep pitches and narrow roads, none of which go the same direction for more than a mile, all mix together to make it war on a bike. There isn't a race in North America that compares. Flanders may as well be a different sport." – George Hincapie

== Winners ==
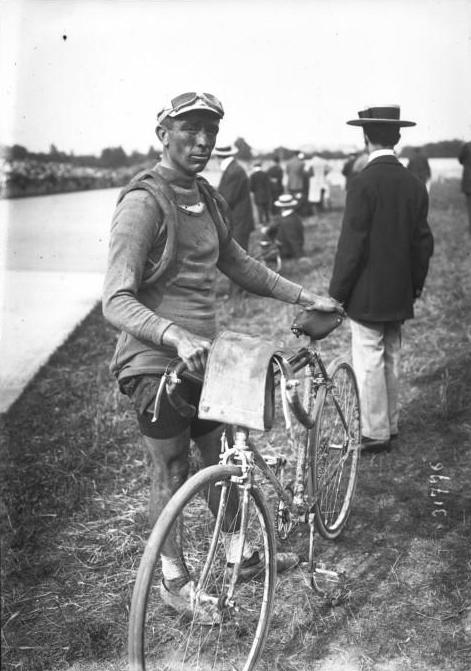
Paul Deman (pictured at the 1913 Tour de France) won the inaugural Tour of Flanders.

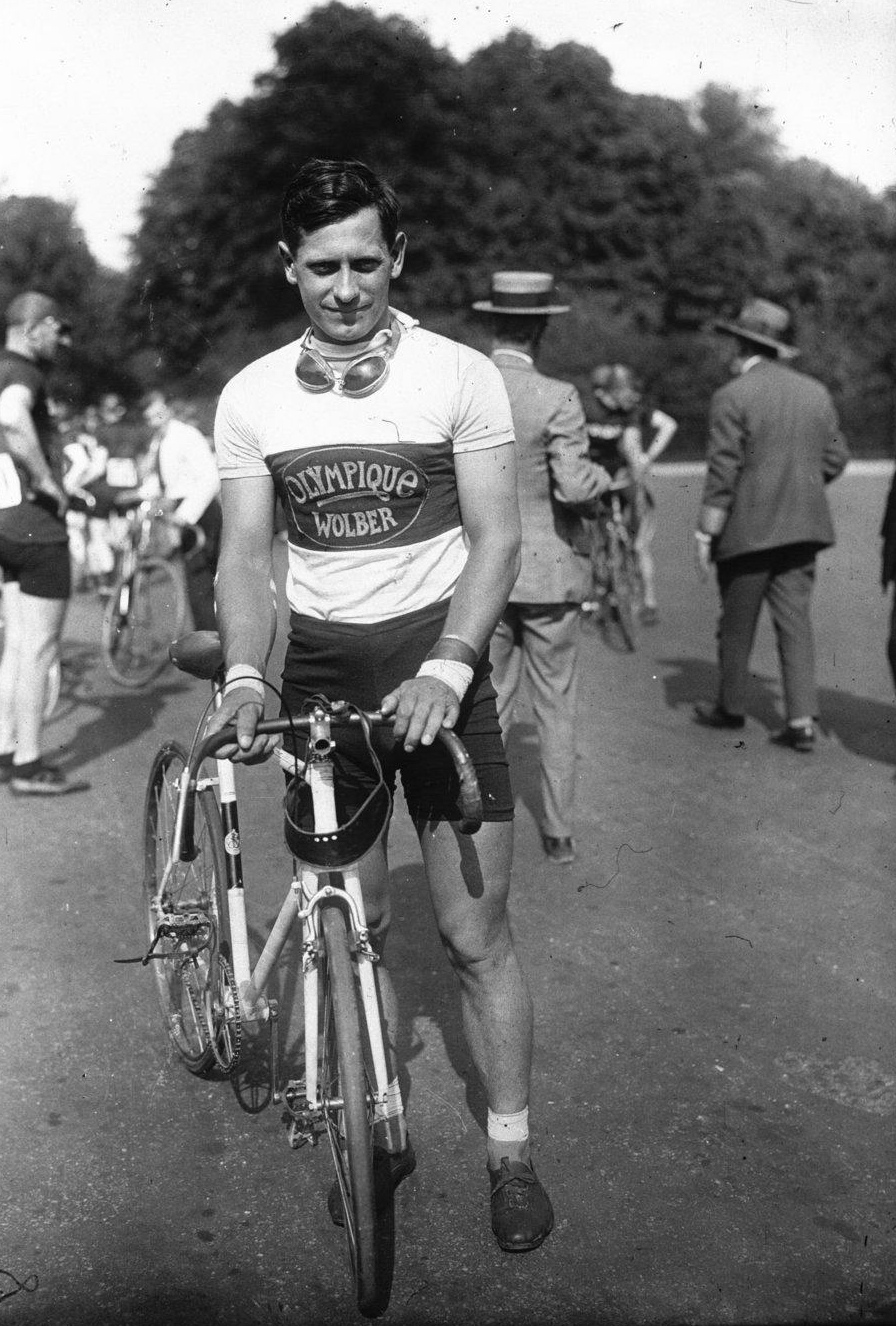
Swiss Heiri Suter was the first non-Belgian winner of the race in 1923.

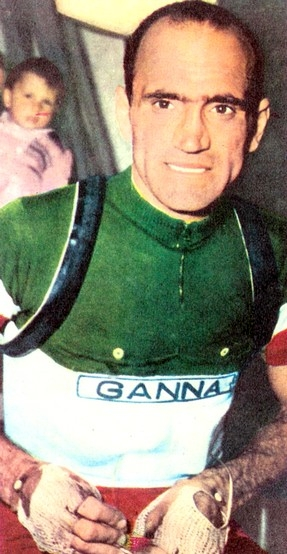
Italian Fiorenzo Magni is the only rider who won the Tour of Flanders three consecutive times, completing his triptych in just four participations. He abandoned his first race in 1948 and won the next three events.

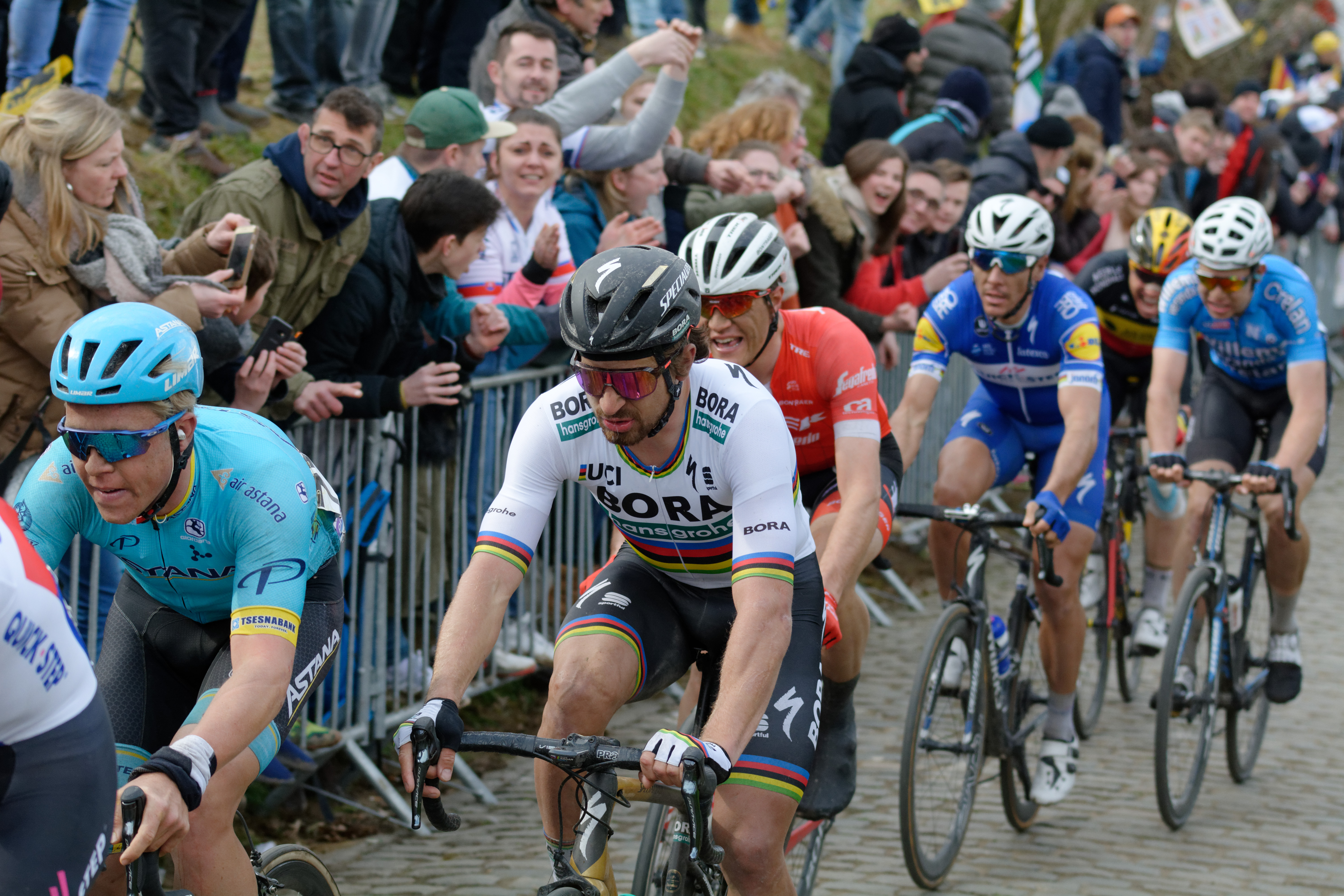
Slovak Peter Sagan (pictured on Oude Kwaremont) won the 100th edition in 2016, and was the fifth rider to do so in the rainbow jersey.

Year	Country	Rider	Team
1913	Belgium	Paul Deman	Automoto–Continental
1914	Belgium	Marcel Buysse	Alcyon–Soly
1915– 1918	No race		
1919	Belgium	Henri Vanlerberghe	–
1920	Belgium	Jules Van Hevel	–
1921	Belgium	René Vermandel	–
1922	Belgium	Léon Devos	–
1923	Switzerland	Heiri Suter	Gurtner
1924	Belgium	Gerard Debaets	Labor
1925	Belgium	Julien Delbecque	Armor
1926	Belgium	Denis Verschueren	Wonder
1927	Belgium	Gerard Debaets	J.B. Louvet
1928	Belgium	Jan Mertens	Thomann
1929	Belgium	Jef Dervaes	Génial Lucifer–Hutchinson
1930	Belgium	Frans Bonduel	Dilecta–Wolber
1931	Belgium	Romain Gijssels	Dilecta–Wolber
1932	Belgium	Romain Gijssels	Dilecta
1933	Belgium	Alfons Schepers	La Française
1934	Belgium	Gaston Rebry	Alcyon–Dunlop
1935	Belgium	Louis Duerloo	Génial Lucifer
1936	Belgium	Louis Hardiquest	De Dion
1937	Belgium	Michel D'Hooghe	Van Hauwaert
1938	Belgium	Edgard de Caluwé	Dilecta–Wolber
1939	Belgium	Karel Kaers	Alcyon–Dunlop
1940	Belgium	Achiel Buysse	Dilecta
1941	Belgium	Achiel Buysse	Dilecta
1942	Belgium	Briek Schotte	Mercier–Hutchinson
1943	Belgium	Achiel Buysse	Dilecta
1944	Belgium	Rik Van Steenbergen	Mercier–Hutchinson
1945	Belgium	Sylvain Grysolle	–
1946	Belgium	Rik Van Steenbergen	Mercier–Hutchinson
1947	Belgium	Emiel Faignaert	Dilecta
1948	Belgium	Briek Schotte	Alcyon–Dunlop
1949	Italy	Fiorenzo Magni	Wilier Triestina
1950	Italy	Fiorenzo Magni	Wilier Triestina
1951	Italy	Fiorenzo Magni	Ganna–Ursus
1952	Belgium	Roger Decock	Bertin
1953	Netherlands	Wim van Est	Garin–Wolber
1954	Belgium	Raymond Impanis	Mercier–Hutchinson
1955	France	Louison Bobet	Mercier–BP–Hutchinson
1956	France	Jean Forestier	Follis–Dunlop
1957	Belgium	Fred De Bruyne	Carpano–Coppi
1958	Belgium	Germain Derijcke	Carpano
1959	Belgium	Rik Van Looy	Faema–Guerra
1960	Belgium	Arthur De Cabooter	Groene Leeuw–Sinalco–SAS
1961	Great Britain	Tom Simpson	Rapha–Gitane–Dunlop
1962	Belgium	Rik Van Looy	Flandria–Faema–Clément
1963	Belgium	Noel Foré	Flandria–Faema
1964	West Germany	Rudi Altig	Saint-Raphaël–Gitane–Dunlop
1965	Netherlands	Jo de Roo	Televizier
1966	Belgium	Edward Sels	Solo–Superia
1967	Italy	Dino Zandegù	Salvarani
1968	Belgium	Walter Godefroot	Flandria–De Clerck
1969	Belgium	Eddy Merckx	Faema
1970	Belgium	Eric Leman	Flandria–Mars
1971	Netherlands	Evert Dolman	Flandria–Mars
1972	Belgium	Eric Leman	Bic
1973	Belgium	Eric Leman	Peugeot–BP–Michelin
1974	Netherlands	Cees Bal	Gan–Mercier–Hutchinson
1975	Belgium	Eddy Merckx	Molteni–RYC
1976	Belgium	Walter Planckaert	Maes Pils–Rokado
1977	Belgium	Roger De Vlaeminck	Brooklyn
1978	Belgium	Walter Godefroot	IJsboerke–Gios
1979	Netherlands	Jan Raas	TI–Raleigh–McGregor
1980	Belgium	Michel Pollentier	Splendor
1981	Netherlands	Hennie Kuiper	DAF Trucks–Côte d'Or
1982	Belgium	René Martens	DAF Trucks–TeVe Blad
1983	Netherlands	Jan Raas	TI–Raleigh–Campagnolo
1984	Netherlands	Johan Lammerts	Panasonic–Raleigh
1985	Belgium	Eric Vanderaerden	Panasonic–Raleigh
1986	Netherlands	Adrie van der Poel	Kwantum–Decosol–Yoko
1987	Belgium	Claude Criquielion	Hitachi–Marc
1988	Belgium	Eddy Planckaert	AD Renting–Mini-Flat–Enerday
1989	Belgium	Edwig van Hooydonck	Superconfex–Yoko–Opel–Colnago
1990	Italy	Moreno Argentin	Ariostea
1991	Belgium	Edwig van Hooydonck	Buckler–Colnago–Decca
1992	France	Jacky Durand	Castorama
1993	Belgium	Johan Museeuw	GB–MG Maglificio
1994	Italy	Gianni Bugno	Team Polti–Vaporetto
1995	Belgium	Johan Museeuw	Mapei–GB–Latexco
1996	Italy	Michele Bartoli	MG Maglificio–Technogym
1997	Denmark	Rolf Sørensen	Rabobank
1998	Belgium	Johan Museeuw	Mapei–Bricobi
1999	Belgium	Peter van Petegem	TVM–Farm Frites
2000	Belgium	Andrei Tchmil	Lotto–Adecco
2001	Italy	Gianluca Bortolami	Tacconi Sport–Vini Caldirola
2002	Italy	Andrea Tafi	Mapei–Quick-Step
2003	Belgium	Peter van Petegem	Lotto–Domo
2004	Germany	Steffen Wesemann	T-Mobile Team
2005	Belgium	Tom Boonen	Quick-Step–Innergetic
2006	Belgium	Tom Boonen	Quick-Step–Innergetic
2007	Italy	Alessandro Ballan	Lampre–Fondital
2008	Belgium	Stijn Devolder	Quick-Step
2009	Belgium	Stijn Devolder	Quick-Step
2010	Switzerland	Fabian Cancellara	Team Saxo Bank
2011	Belgium	Nick Nuyens	Saxo Bank–SunGard
2012	Belgium	Tom Boonen	Omega Pharma–Quick-Step
2013	Switzerland	Fabian Cancellara	RadioShack–Leopard
2014	Switzerland	Fabian Cancellara	Trek Factory Racing
2015	Norway	Alexander Kristoff	Team Katusha
2016	Slovakia	Peter Sagan	Tinkoff
2017	Belgium	Philippe Gilbert	Quick-Step Floors
2018	Netherlands	Niki Terpstra	Quick-Step Floors
2019	Italy	Alberto Bettiol	EF Education First
2020	Netherlands	Mathieu van der Poel	Alpecin–Fenix
2021	Denmark	Kasper Asgreen	Deceuninck–Quick-Step
2022	Netherlands	Mathieu van der Poel	Alpecin–Fenix
2023	Slovenia	Tadej Pogačar	UAE Team Emirates
2024	Netherlands	Mathieu van der Poel	Alpecin–Deceuninck
2025	Slovenia	Tadej Pogačar	UAE Team Emirates XRG
2026	Slovenia	Tadej Pogačar	UAE Team Emirates XRG

=== Multiple winners ===
Wins	Rider	Editions
3	Achiel Buysse (BEL)	1940, 1941, 1943
3	Fiorenzo Magni (ITA)	1949, 1950, 1951
3	Eric Leman (BEL)	1970, 1972, 1973
3	Johan Museeuw (BEL)	1993, 1995, 1998
3	Tom Boonen (BEL)	2005, 2006, 2012
3	Fabian Cancellara (SUI)	2010, 2013, 2014
3	Mathieu van der Poel (NED)	2020, 2022, 2024
3	Tadej Pogačar (SLO)	2023, 2025, 2026
2	Gerard Debaets (BEL)	1924, 1927
2	Romain Gijssels (BEL)	1931, 1932
2	Briek Schotte (BEL)	1942, 1948
2	Rik Van Steenbergen (BEL)	1944, 1946
2	Rik Van Looy (BEL)	1959, 1962
2	Walter Godefroot (BEL)	1968, 1978
2	Eddy Merckx (BEL)	1969, 1975
2	Jan Raas (NED)	1979, 1983
2	Edwig Van Hooydonck (BEL)	1989, 1991
2	Peter Van Petegem (BEL)	1999, 2003
2	Stijn Devolder (BEL)	2008, 2009

=== Wins per country ===
Wins	Country
69	Belgium
13	Netherlands
11	Italy
4	Switzerland
3	France; Slovenia
2	Denmark; Germany (including West Germany)
1	Great Britain; Norway; Slovakia

=== Winners of the Cobbled Classics Double ===
On 13 occasions the Tour of Flanders and Paris–Roubaix had the same winner in the same year. Tom Boonen and Fabian Cancellara are the only riders who have achieved this double twice.

Rider	Country	Year
Henri Suter	Switzerland	1923
Romain Gijssels	Belgium	1932
Gaston Rebry	Belgium	1934
Raymond Impanis	Belgium	1954
Fred De Bruyne	Belgium	1957
Rik Van Looy	Belgium	1962
Roger De Vlaeminck	Belgium	1977
Peter van Petegem	Belgium	2003
Tom Boonen	Belgium	2005
Fabian Cancellara	Switzerland	2010
Tom Boonen (2)	Belgium	2012
Fabian Cancellara (2)	Switzerland	2013
Mathieu van der Poel	Netherlands	2024

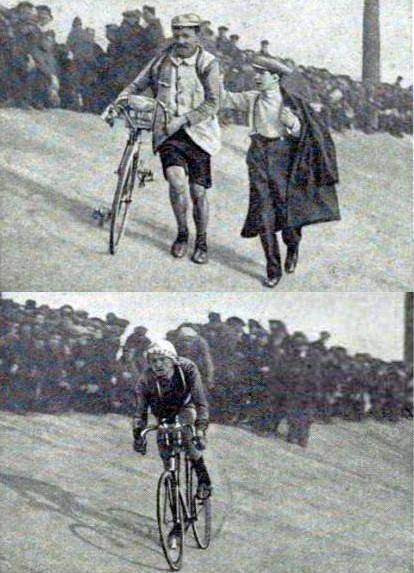
Henri Van Lerberghe won the 1919 Tour of Flanders with a 14-minute lead over the second-place finisher, the largest margin in the history of the race. Top: Van Lerberghe's walking finish. Bottom: runner-up Léon Buysse.

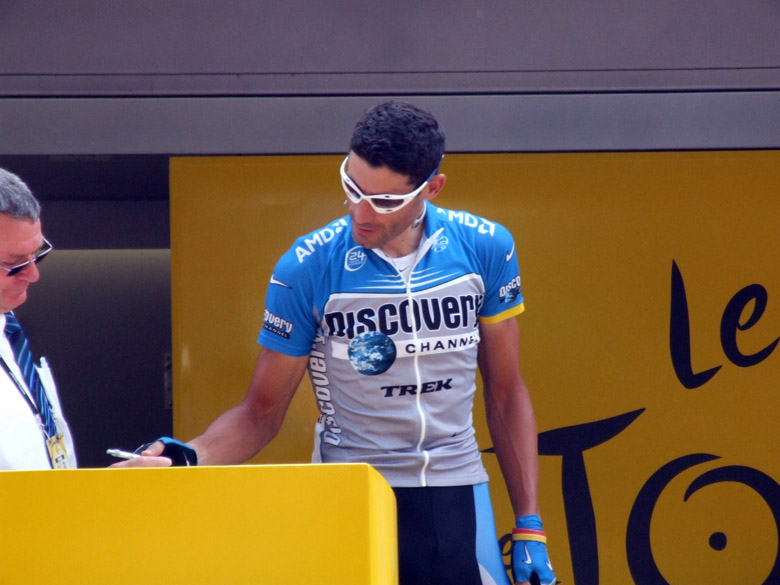
American George Hincapie (pictured at the Tour de France) finished the event a record 17 times in all of his participations.

== Records and statistics ==
- The longest Tour of Flanders was its first running in 1913: 324 km (201 mi)
- The shortest Tour of Flanders was the war-time edition of 1941: 198 km (123 mi)
- The fastest edition was in 2025, won by Tadej Pogačar: 44.981 km/h (27.950 mph) average.
- The slowest edition was in 1923, won by Swiss Heiri Suter: 26.2 km/h (16.3 mph) average.
- The smallest margin between the winner and runner-up was in 1994, when Gianni Bugno beat Johan Museeuw by 7 mm (0.28 in) in a sprint.
- The largest margin between the winner and runner-up was in 1919, when Henri Van Lerberghe held a 14-minute lead over the first chasing group.
- The largest post-war margin between the winner and runner-up was in 1969, when Eddy Merckx won by a margin of 5 minutes 36 seconds over second-place finisher Felice Gimondi. In 1951 Fiorenzo Magni won by 5 minutes 35 seconds Bernard Gauthier.
- The youngest winner was Rik Van Steenbergen in 1944 at 19 years and 206 days.
- The oldest winner was Andrei Tchmil in 2000 at 37 years and 71 days.
- The Tour of Flanders attracts 600.000-800.000 spectators along the road annually, on a total Flemish population of 6.5 million.
- The record for most participations is held by Belgian Briek Schotte, who participated 20 consecutive times from 1940 to 1959 and finished 16 times with 8 podium places and 2 victories in 1942 and 1948.
- American George Hincapie holds the record of most finishes, with 17 finishes in 17 races.
- Eight men share the record of victories, with three each: Achiel Buysse won in 1940, 1941 and 1943; Italian Fiorenzo Magni won in 1949, 1950, 1951; Eric Leman won in 1970, 1972 and 1973; Johan Museeuw won the race in 1993, 1995 and 1998; Tom Boonen won in 2005, 2006 and 2012, Swiss Fabian Cancellara, who won in 2010, 2013 and 2014, Netherlands' Mathieu van der Poel, who won in 2020, 2022 and 2024, and Slovenian Tadej Pogacar, who won in 2023, 2025 and 2026.
- The nation with the most victories is Belgium (69).
- Eight riders have won two years in a row: Romain Gijssels, Achiel Buysse, Fiorenzo Magni, Eric Leman, Tom Boonen, Stijn Devolder, Fabian Cancellara and Tadej Pogacar.
- Only one rider (Fiorenzo Magni) won three consecutive victories.
- Two riders achieved a record eight podium finishes: Briek Schotte (twice first, twice second, four times third) and Johan Museeuw (three times first, three times second, twice third).
- Mathieu van der Poel is the only rider with seven consecutive podium finishes (three times first, three times second, once third) between 2020 and 2026.
- Sean Kelly and Leif Hoste have the most second places without ever winning the Tour of Flanders, each finishing second on three occasions.
- Seven riders won the race in the rainbow jersey as world champions: Louison Bobet in 1955, Rik Van Looy in 1962, Eddy Merckx in 1975, Tom Boonen in 2006, Peter Sagan in 2016, Mathieu van der Poel in 2024 and Tadej Pogačar in 2025 and 2026.

== Tour of Flanders for Women ==
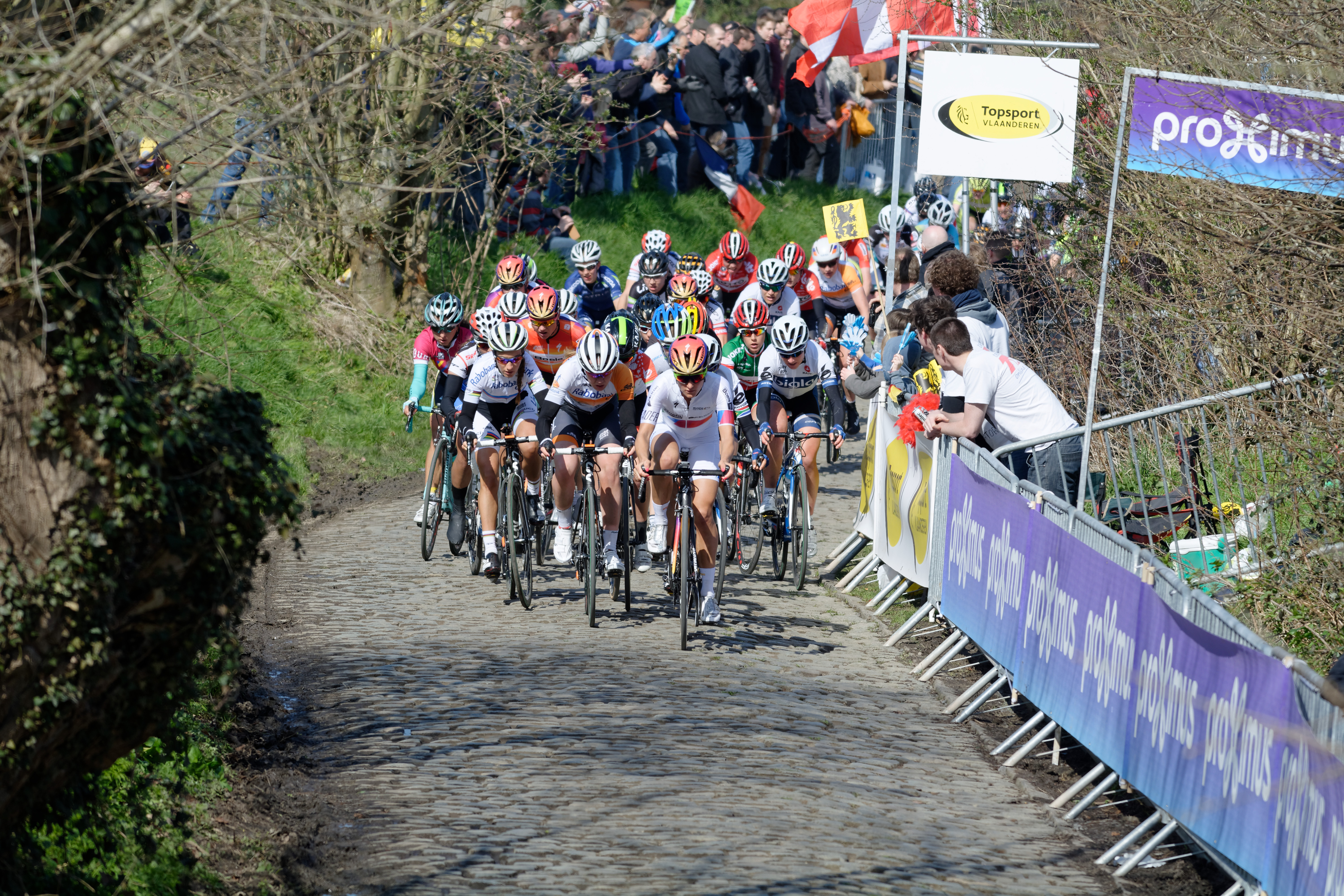
The women's peloton climbing Oude Kwaremont during the 2015 women's event.

Since 2004 there is a women's Tour of Flanders (Dutch: Ronde van Vlaanderen voor Vrouwen), held every spring on the same day as the men's race. It is part of the UCI Women's World Tour and is considered one of the most prestigious events in women cycling.

From 2004 to 2011 the race ran over a 115 km (71 mi) course which started in Oudenaarde and finished in Meerbeke, with the last 55 km (34 mi) identical to the men's race. Since 2012 the race starts and finishes in Oudenaarde. It is 155 km (96 mi) and has a similar finale as the men's Tour of Flanders, with many of the same hills, except for the Koppenberg. In 2018 the race features 12 climbs, including the Muur van Geraardsbergen, Oude Kwaremont, Paterberg and three long flat cobbled sectors. The final 35 km (22 mi), including Kruisberg, Oude Kwaremont and Paterberg, are identical to the men's finale.

Belgian rider Lotte Kopecky currently hold the record with three wins.

== Legacy and impact ==
Tour of Flanders Center in Oudenaarde

The history of the Tour of Flanders is celebrated at the Centrum Ronde van Vlaanderen (Tour of Flanders Center), an interactive cycling-themed experience center and museum in Oudenaarde. It opened in 2003 with an extensive array of audiovisual material from old television and radio broadcasts. Visitors are able to experience a ride on a cobbled road or experience the Kwaremont climb, in a virtual contest with stars like Peter Van Petegem.

The center's founder and director is former sports journalist and writer Rik Van Walleghem; the museum curator is 1970s cycling icon Freddy Maertens, who provides guided tours.

The center is located on Oudenaarde's city square, close to the finish of the Tour of Flanders which relocated to Oudenaarde in 2012. There is also a brasserie and a museum shop.

Since 1999, fans are also able to participate in the amateur Tour of Flanders Cyclosportive, called We Ride Flanders, organized on the Saturday before the professional events. The longest route is 229 km (142 mi), starting in Bruges, but there are three shorter routes, of 174 km (108 mi), 140 km (87 mi) or 74 km (46 mi), which all start and finish in Oudenaarde. Because of its growing success, the number of participants has been restricted to 16,000 in order to secure riders' safety on the roads. Tickets are usually sold out months before the race. 60% of participants are non-Belgians.

== See also ==
- Tour of Flanders (women's race)
- Classic cycle races
- Cycling monument

== Sources ==
- Schroeders, Fer (1999). Les Classiques du 20ème Siècle. Belgium: De Eeclonaar. ISBN 90-74128-58-0.
- Vanwalleghem, Rik (1991). De ronde van Vlaanderen [The Tour of Flanders] (in Dutch). Belgium: Pinguin. ISBN 9789073322035.
- —— (1998). Het wonder van Vlaanderen: het epos van de ronde [The wonder of Flanders: the epic of the Tour] (in Dutch). Belgium: Pinguin. ISBN 9789020935288.
- —— (2003). De Ronde van Vlaanderen: de ziel, de helden, het epos [The Tour of Flanders: the soul, the heroes, the epic] (in Dutch). Belgium: Lannoo. ISBN 9789020951370.
