= Six Days of Boston =

Race details
- Region: Boston, United States
- Discipline: Track
- Type: Six-day racing

History
- First edition: 1901
- Editions: 13
- Final edition: 1933
- First winner: (United States) Fred Bowler (United States) Otto Maya
- Most wins: (Australia) Alfred Goullet (United States) Alfred Hill (United States) Norman Hill (2 wins)
- Final winner: (United States) Dave Lands (United States) Charly Ritter

The Six Days of Boston was a six-day cycling event, held in Boston, Massachusetts, USA, between 1901 and 1933. It took place thirteen times during that period. Alfred Goullet, Alfred Hill and Norman Hill share the record with two wins each.

== Roll of honor ==
Edition	Winners	Second	Third
1901	(United States) Fred Bowler (United States) Otto Maya	(United States) Hugh McLean (United States) Jimmy Moran	(United States) Blecker (United States) Floyd McFarland
1902	(United States) Floyd McFarland (United States) Otto Maya	(United States) George Leander (United States) John Rutz	(United States) Howard Freeman (United States) Ben Munroe
1903-1906	Not held		
1907	(United States) Floyd Krebs (United States) Hugh McLean	(United States) Joe Fogler (United States) Jimmy Moran	(United States) Walter Bardgett (United States) Eddy Root
1908	(Denmark) Niels Marius Anderson (United States) Iver Lawson	(United States) Pat Logan (United States) Worth Mitten	(United States) Charles Vanoni (United States) Williams
1909	Not held		
1910	(United States) Frank Kramer (United States) Jimmy Moran	(Australia) Alfred Goullet (Australia) Paddy Hehir	(United States) Elmer Collins (United States) Joe Fogler
1911	Not held		
1912	(United States) Joe Fogler (United States) Jimmy Moran	(United States) Eddy Root (Australia) Paddy Hehir	(United States) John Bedell (United States) Ernie Pye
1913	(United States) Joe Fogler (United States) Iver Lawson	(United States) Eddy Root (Australia) Paddy Hehir	(United States) Percy Lawrence (United States) Jake Magin
1914	(Australia) Alfred Goullet (United States) Alfred Hill	(Australia) Reginald McNamara (United States) Jimmy Moran	(United States) Peter Drobach (United States) Iver Lawson
1915	(Australia) Alfred Grenda (United States) Alfred Hill	(Australia) Reginald McNamara (Australia) Robert Spears	(United States) Menus Bedell (United States) Jake Magin
1916	(Australia) Alfred Grenda (Australia) Alfred Goullet	(Australia) Frank Corry (United States) Jake Magin	(United States) Percy Lawrence (United States) Lloyd Thomas
1917-1925	Not held		
1926	(Australia) Harris Horder (Australia) Alec McBeath	(United States) Anthony Beckman (United States) Bob Walthour	(United States) Dave Lands (Germany) Otto Petri
1927-1932	Not held		
1933 (1)	(United States) Dave Lands (United States) Norman Hill	(United States) Willie Grimm (Italy) Edoardo Severgnini	(Germany) Franz Duelberg (United States) Charles Winter
1933 (2)	(United States) Albert Crossley (United States) Norman Hill	(United States) Tino Reboli (United States) Bob Walthour	(United States) Dave Lands (United States) Charly Ritter
