= Six Days of Newark =

Race details
- Date: 1910-1913: February; 1914: March; 1915: August
- Region: Newark, New Jersey, United States
- Discipline: Track
- Type: Six-day racing

History
- First edition: 1910
- Editions: 4
- Final edition: 1915
- First winner: Willy Fenn (USA) Frank Kramer (USA)
- Final winner: Reggie McNamara (AUS) Robert Spears (AUS)

The Six Days of Newark was a former six-day cycling event, held in Newark, New Jersey. From 1910 to 1915 four editions of the Six Days were held.

== Roll of honor ==
| Edition | Winners | Second | Third |
|---|---|---|---|
| 1910 | Willy Fenn (USA); Frank Kramer (USA) | Iver Lawson (USA); Jimmy Moran (USA) | Paddy Hehir (AUS); Ernie Pye (AUS) |
| 1911–12 | Not held | | |
| 1913 | Paddy Hehir (AUS); Peter Drobach (USA) | Worth Mitten (USA); Gordon Walker (AUS) | Martin Ryan (USA); Lloyd Thomas (USA) |
| 1914 | Alfred Goullet (AUS); Alfred Hill (USA) | George Cameron (USA); Harry Kaiser (USA) | Gordon Walker (AUS); Ted Wohlrab (USA) |
| 1915 | Reggie McNamara (AUS); Robert Spears (AUS) | | |

== Full results ==
=== 1910 ===
The 1910 Six Days of Newark took place from 6 to 12 February.

1. Willy Fenn senior (Usa) - Frank Kramer (Usa)
2. Ivar Lawson (Usa) - Jim Moran (Usa)
3. Paddy Hehir (Aus) - Ernie Pye (Aus)
4. John Bedell (Usa) - Menus Bedell (Usa)
5. Walter Bardgett (Usa) - Elmer Collins (Usa) à 1 tour
6. Niels-Marius Andersen (Dan) - Floyd Krebs (Usa)
7. Frank Galvin (Usa) - West (Usa)
8. Worth Mitten (Usa) - Rupprecht (Usa)

=== 1913 ===
1. Peter Drobach (Usa) - Paddy Hehir (Aus)
2. Worth Mitten (Usa) - Gordon Walker (Aus)
3. Martin Ryan (Usa) - Lloyd Thomas (Usa)
4. George Cameron (Usa) - Ray Dieffenbacher (Usa) à 1 tour
5. Clarence Carman (Usa) - Walter De Mara (Usa)
6. Willy Coburn (Usa) - Bill Loftes (Usa)
7. McKay (Usa) - Wilcox (Usa) à 2 tours
8. Jack Blatz (Usa) - Floyd Krebs (Usa) à 3 tours

=== 1914 ===
1. Alfred Gouller (Aus) - Alfred Hill (Usa)
2. George Cameron (Usa) - Harry Kaiser (Usa)
3. Gordon Walker (Aus) - Ted Wohlrab (Usa)
4. Frank Cavanagh (Usa) - Robert "Bob" Walthour senior (Usa)
5. Peter Drobach (Usa) - Jim Moran (Usa)
6. Frank Corry (Aus) - Robert "Bob" Spears (Aus)
7. Marcel Dupuy (Fra) - Victor Linart (Bel)
