= Oscar Egg =

Swiss cyclist (1890–1961)

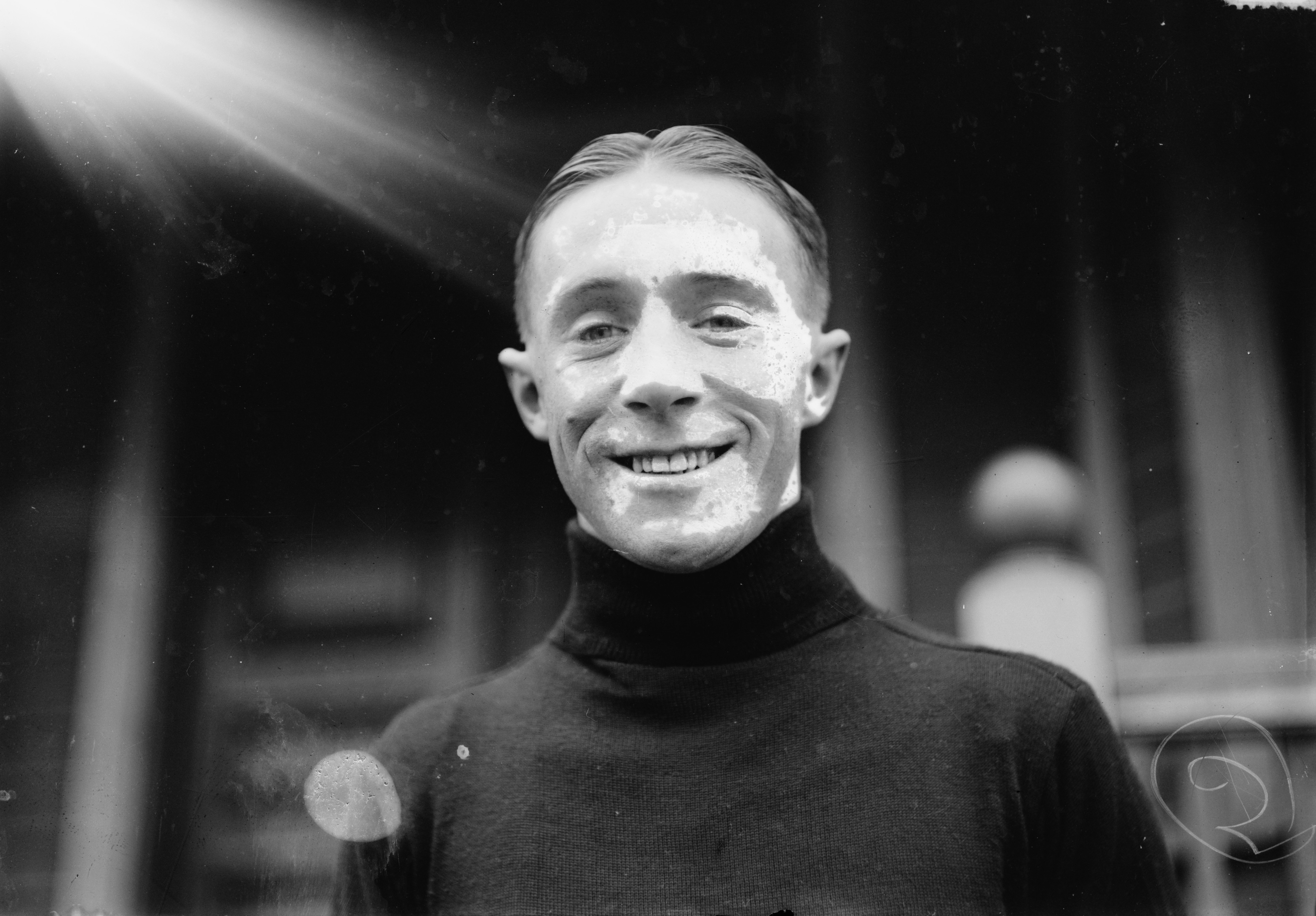

Personal information
- Full name: Oscar Egg
- Born: 2 March 1890 Schlatt, Switzerland
- Died: 9 February 1961 (aged 70) Nice, France

Cycling career
- Sport: Cycling
- Disciplines: Road and track
- Role: Rider

Professional teams
- 1911: Griffon
- 1912–1914: Peugeot
- 1915–1916: Individual
- 1917–1919: Bianchi
- 1920–1926: Individual

Major wins
- set the hour record 3 times 2 stages Tour de France (1914); 1 stage Giro d'Italia (1919); Paris Tours (1914); Milano–Torino (1917)

Oscar Egg (2 March 1890 – 9 February 1961) was a Swiss track and road bicycle racer. He captured the world hour record three times before the First World War and won major road races and stages of the Tour de France and Giro d'Italia. He was also a noted developer of racing bicycles and bicycle components including lugs and derailleurs.

== The hour record ==
Between 1907 and 1914 Oscar Egg and Marcel Berthet improved the hour record six times between them. Egg's 1914 mark of 44.247 km then stood until 1933. Egg set all three of his records at the Vélodrome Buffalo in Paris. The track was a 333m outdoor track surfaced with concrete. The sequence was as follows:

- 20 Jun 1907, Marcel Berthet, Paris, 41.520 km
- 22 Aug 1912, Oscar Egg, Paris, 42.122 km
- 7 Aug 1913, Marcel Berthet, Paris, 42.741 km
- 21 Aug 1913, Oscar Egg, Paris, 43.525 km
- 20 Sep 1913, Marcel Berthet, Paris, 43.775 km
- 18 Aug 1914, Oscar Egg, Paris, 44.247 km

Only Chris Boardman has equaled Egg and Berthet's feat of taking the record three times. The last record, set by Egg in 1914, would stand for nearly 20 years until it was broken in 1933 by Francis Faure on a Mochet velocar. This caused such a reaction that Faure's achievement was disqualified by the Union Cycliste Internationale (UCI) in 1934.

== Racing ==
=== Road ===
1911
Tour de France:

Winner stages 8, 10 and 11 (independents category)

1914
Switzerland national road race championship
Paris–Tours
Tour de France:

Winner stages 4 and 5

1917
Milano–Torino
Milano-Modena
1919
Giro d'Italia:

Winner stage 3

Circuit des Champs de Bataille

dropped out in stage 2

=== Track ===
Major track victories include:

1914
Six days of Chicago
1915
Six days of Chicago (with Francesco Verri)
1916
Six days of New York (with Marcel Dupuy)
Switzerland national track championship
1921
He defeated Alfred Goullet on July 4, 1921 at the Newark Velodrome in Newark, New Jersey Six day race in New York with Piet van Kempen.
Six days of Paris (with Georges Sérès père)
1922
Six Days of Ghent (with Marcel Buysse)
1923
Six days of Paris (with Piet Van Kempen)
Six days of Chicago (with Maurice Brocco)
1924
Six days of Chicago (with Alfred Grenda)
Bol d'Or
1926
Switzerland national track sprint championship

Records
Preceded by Marcel Berthet	UCI hour record (42.122 km); 22 August 1912-7 August 1913	Succeeded by Marcel Berthet
Preceded by Marcel Berthet	UCI hour record (43.525 km); 21 August 1913-20 September 1913	Succeeded by Marcel Berthet
Preceded by Marcel Berthet	UCI hour record (44.247 km); 18 August 1914-25 August 1933	Succeeded by Jan van Hout

== Cycling components ==
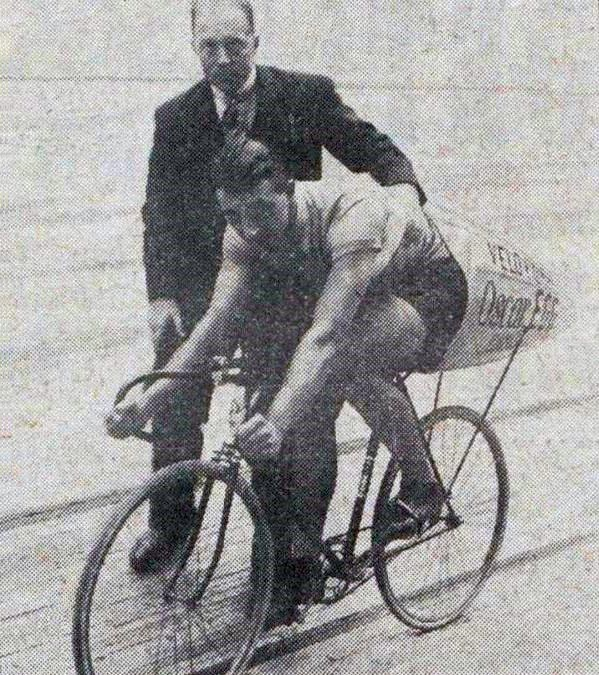
Egg on his so-called rocket-bike

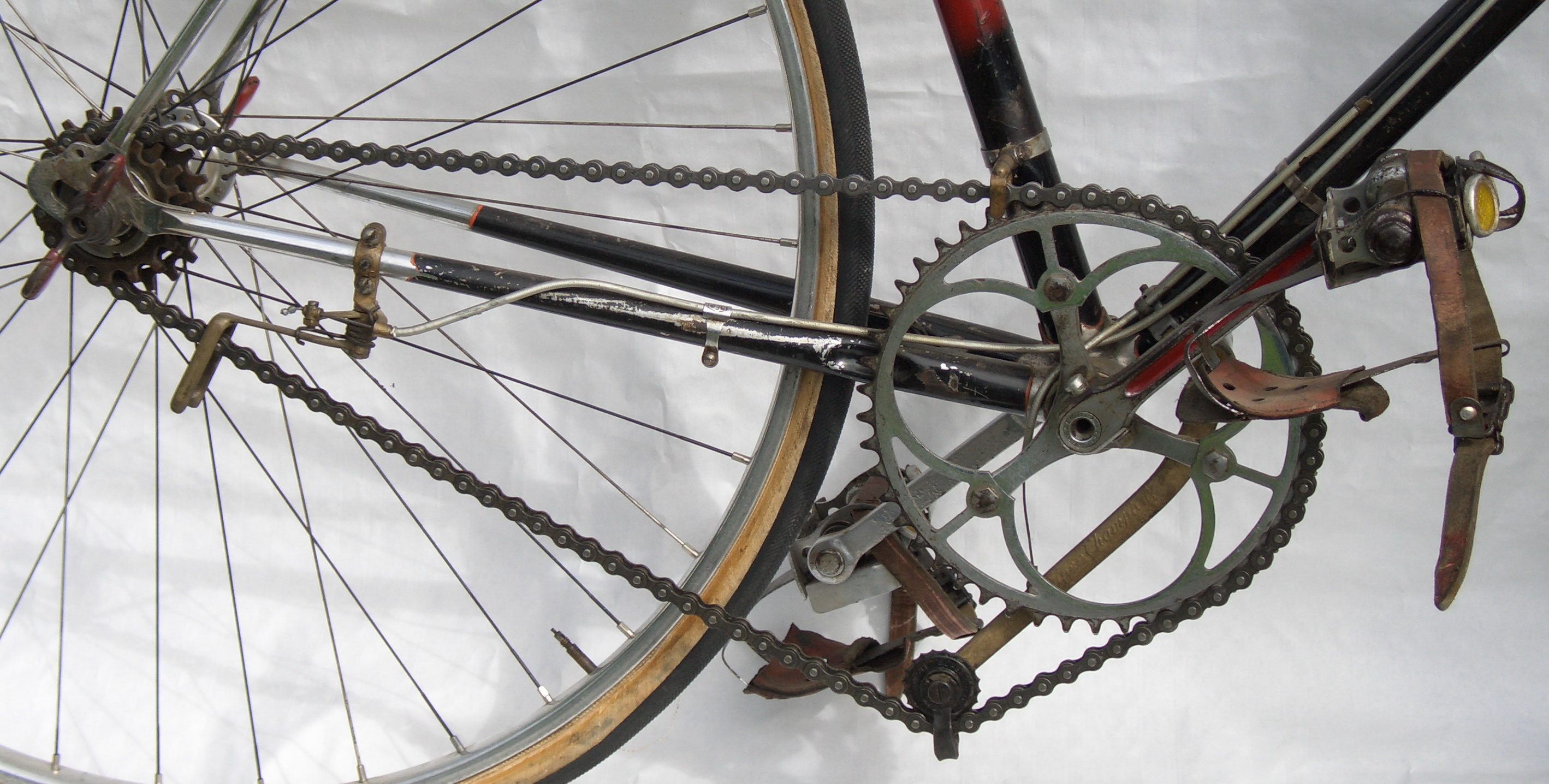
Super Champion derailleur

Oscar Egg owned a bicycle shop and workshop in Paris, and began manufacturing racing bicycles and components after he retired from racing.

=== Aerodynamic fairings ===
Egg tested an aerodynamic fairing in the form of a tail cone on a bicycle labeled the rocket-bike (vélo-fusée in French) in 1913. In response to the success of the Vélo-Vélocar in the 1930s, Egg created a streamlined recumbent in an effort to be the first to travel more than 50 kilometers in a single hour, but he was beaten to it by Francis Faure in an actual Vélo-Vélocar.

=== Derailleurs ===
Egg introduced his first derailleur, called Champion, in 1932. It supported as many as 3 different gear ratios and consisted of two parts: a fork mounted near the rear sprocket for moving the chain and a separate tension arm mounted near the front chainring for taking up slack. Shifting gears required back-pedaling. He followed up in 1933 with the Super Champion. It was the official derailleur of the French, Belgian, Spanish, and German Tour de France teams in 1937, the first year that derailleurs were permitted in the race. The device became so popular that more than 1 million were manufactured by 1939.

Egg Super Champion derailleurs were marketed in Britain by the Constrictor Tyre and Accessories Company under the name Osgear.

By the 1950s, fork-type derailleurs, such as the Egg Super Champion, were superseded by double pulley designs, and production ceased before 1960.

=== Lugs ===
Egg developed and marketed lugs for the assembly of steel bicycle frames by brazing. Frames exist with decals advertising the fact that they use "Oscar Egg Super Champion Lugs".

=== Other ===
Other components bearing Egg's name include brakes, cranks, fork crowns, frames, and hubs.
