= Six Days of New York =

Cycling event

Coordinates: 40°45′2″N 73°59′37″W

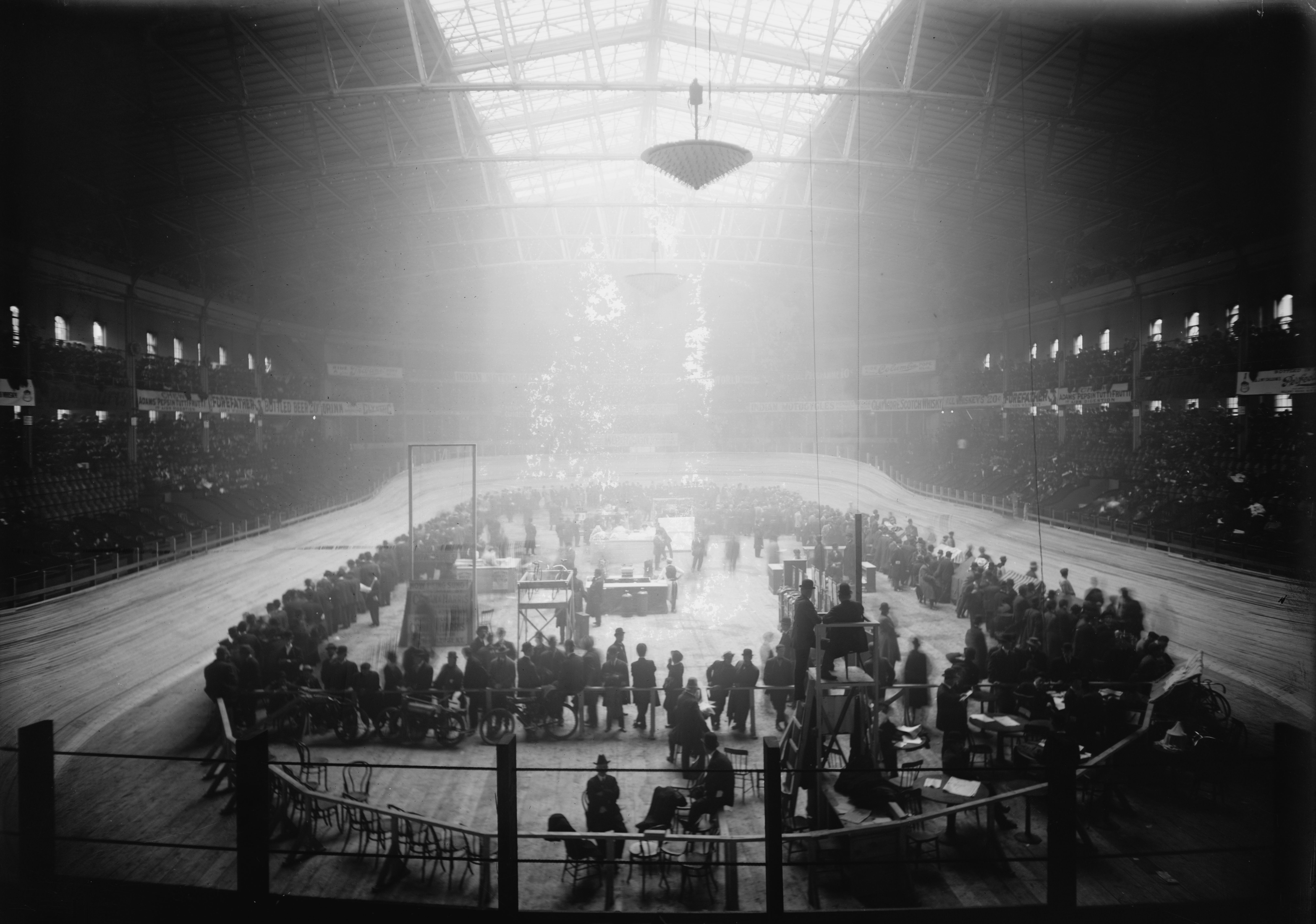
- 1908 Six Days of New York

Race details
- Region: New York, United States
- Discipline: Track
- Type: Six-day racing

History
- First edition: 1899
- Editions: 73
- Final edition: 1961
- First winner: Charles Miller (USA) Frank Waller (USA)
- Most wins: Alfred Goullet (AUS); Franco Giorgetti (ITA) (8 wins)
- Final winner: Oskar Plattner (SUI); Armin von Büren (SUI)

The Six Days of New York was a former six-day cycling event, held in New York City, in Madison Square Garden's velodrome. Between 1899 and 1961, a total of 73 editions were held, sometimes three per year. Only the Six Days of Berlin and the Six Days of Ghent had more runnings. Australian Alfred Goullet and Italian Franco Giorgetti hold the record with eight wins each.

== Madison ==
The madison team event, one of the most popular disciplines in track cycling, was invented during the Six Days of New York and named after the second Madison Square Garden, where the venue was held. In French the discipline is known as the "American race" (course à l'américaine).

== Roll of honor ==
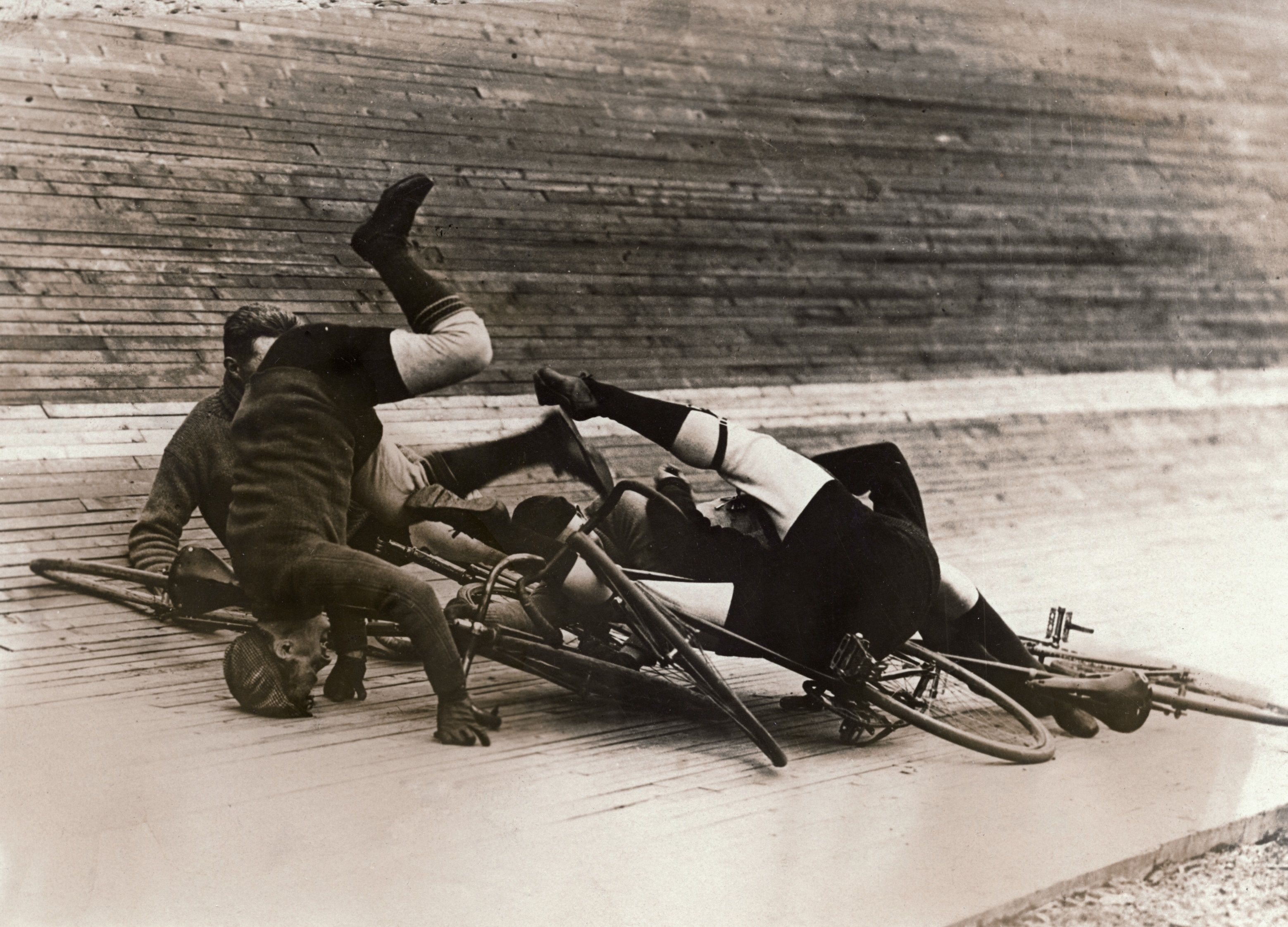
Crash during the 1913 Six Days of New York (staged photo)

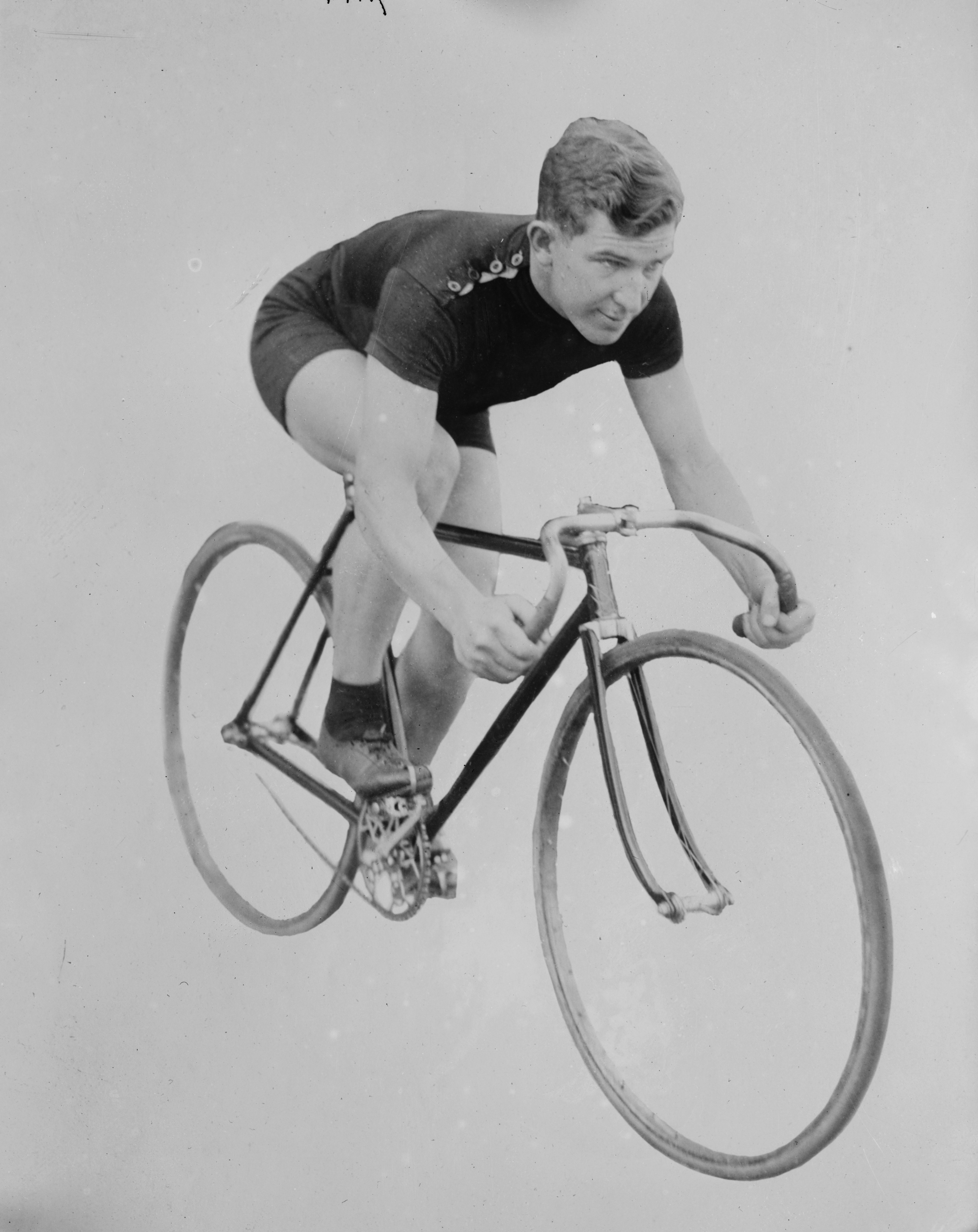
1909 & 1911 Winner: Jackie Clark

Year	Winners
1899	(United States) Charles Miller (United States) Frank Waller
1900	(United States) Floyd MacFarland (United States) Harry Elkes
1901	(United States) Robert Walthour (United States) Archie McEachern
1902	(United States) George Leander (United States) Floyd Krebs
1903	(United States) Robert Walthour (Australia) Ben Munroe
1904	(United States) Oliver Dorlon (United States) Eddy Root
1905	(United States) Joe Fogler (United States) Eddy Root
1906	(United States) Joe Fogler (United States) Eddy Root
1907	Walter Rütt (Netherlands) John Stol
1908	(United States) Floyd McFarland (United States) Jim Moran
1909	Walter Rütt (Australia) Jack Clark
1910	(United States) Eddy Root (United States) Jim Moran
1911	(United States) Joe Fogler (Australia) Jack Clark
1912	(United States) Joe Fogler; Walter Rütt
1913	(United States) Joe Fogler (Australia) Alfred Goullet
1914	(Australia) Alfred Grenda (Australia) Alfred Goullet
1915	(Australia) Alfred Grenda (United States) Alfred Hill
1916	(France) Marcel Dupuy (Switzerland) Oscar Egg
1917	(Australia) Alfred Goullet (United States) Jake Magin
1918	(Australia) Reggie McNamara (United States) Jake Magin
1919	(Australia) Alfred Goullet (United States) Eddy Madden
1920 (1)	(Australia) Alfred Goullet (United States) Jake Magin
1920 (2)	(United States) Ray Eaton (United States) Harry Kaiser
1920 (3)	(France) Maurice Brocco (United States) Willy Coburn

Year	Winners
1921 (1)	(Netherlands) Piet van Kempen (Switzerland) Oscar Egg
1921 (2)	(Australia) Alfred Goullet (France) Maurice Brocco
1922 (1)	(Australia) Reggie McNamara (Australia) Alfred Grenda
1922 (2)	(Australia) Alfred Goullet; Gaetano Belloni
1923 (1)	(Australia) Alfred Goullet (Australia) Alfred Grenda
1923 (2)	(United States) Ernest Kockler (United States) Percy Lawrence
1924 (1)	(France) Maurice Brocco (Belgium) Marcel Buysse
1924 (2)	(Australia) Reggie McNamara (Netherlands) Piet van Kempen
1925 (1)	(United States) Fred Spencer (United States) Bob Walthour
1925 (2)	(Belgium) Gérard Debaets (Belgium) Alfons Goossens
1926 (1)	(Australia) Reggie McNamara; Franco Giorgetti
1926 (2)	(Australia) Reggie McNamara; Pietro Linari
1927 (1)	(Australia) Reggie McNamara; Franco Giorgetti
1927 (2)	(United States) Fred Spencer (United States) Charley Winter
1928 (1)	(Belgium) Gérard Debaets; Franco Giorgetti
1928 (2)	(United States) Fred Spencer; Franco Giorgetti
1929 (1)	(United States) Dave Lands (United States) Willy Grimm
1929 (2)	(Belgium) Gérard Debaets; Franco Giorgetti
1929 (3)	(Belgium) Gérard Debaets; Franco Giorgetti
1930 (1)	(Belgium) Gérard Debaets; Gaetano Belloni
1930 (2)	(Belgium) Maurice Brocco; Franco Giorgetti
1931 (1)	(France) Marcel Guimbretière (France) Alfred Letourneur
1931 (2)	(France) Marcel Guimbretière (France) Alfred Letourneur
1932 (1)	William Peden (Australia) Reggie McNamara

Year	Winners
1932 (2)	William Peden (United States) Fred Spencer
1933 (1)	(Belgium) Gérard Debaets (France) Alfred Letourneur
1933 (2)	William Peden (France) Alfred Letourneur
1934 (1)	(France) Marcel Guimbretière (France) Paul Broccardo
1934 (2)	(Belgium) Gérard Debaets (France) Alfred Letourneur
1935 (1)	Franco Giorgetti (France) Alfred Letourneur
1935 (2)	Gustav Kilian; Heinz Vopel
1936 (1)	Gustav Kilian; Heinz Vopel
1936 (2)	(United States) Jim Walthour (United States) Alfred Crossley
1937 (1)	(Belgium) Jean Aerts (Belgium) Omer de Bruycker
1937 (2)	Gustav Kilian; Heinz Vopel
1938	Gustav Kilian; Heinz Vopel
1939 (1)	William Peden; Douglas Peden
1939 (2)	(United States) Cecil Yates; Cesare Moretti
1940-47	Not held
1948 (1)	(France) Alvaro Giorgetti (United States) Angelo de Bacco
1948 (2)	(Belgium) Emile Bruneau (Belgium) Louis Saen
1948 (3)	(France) Alvaro Giorgetti (United States) Cesare Moretti
1949 (1)	(Switzerland) Hugo Koblet (Switzerland) Walter Diggelmann
1949 (2)	(Australia) Reginald Arnold (Australia) Alfred Strom
1950	(Italy) Ferdinando Terruzzi (Italy) Severino Rigoni
1951-58	Not held
1959	(Italy) Ferdinando Terruzzi (Italy) Leandro Faggin
1960	Not held
1961	(Switzerland) Oscar Plattner (Switzerland) Armin von Büren
