= Floyd MacFarland =

American track cyclist

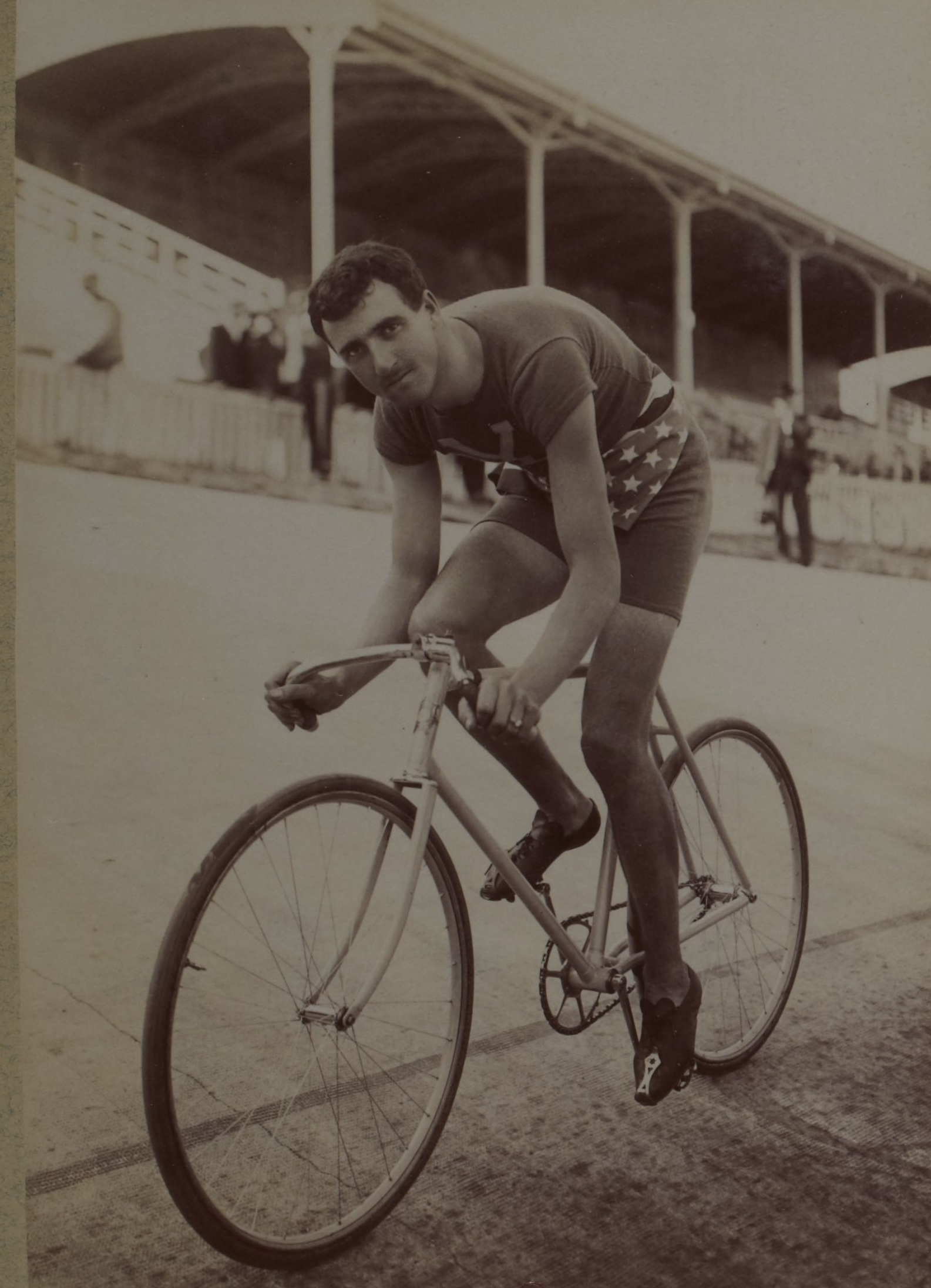
- MacFarland in 1901

Personal information
- Full name: Floyd Alfred MacFarland
- Nickname: The Human Engine
- Born: July 9, 1878 San Jose, California
- Died: April 17, 1915 (aged 36) Newark, New Jersey
- Height: 1.93 m (6 ft 4 in)

Cycling career
- Sport: Cycling
- Discipline: Track
- Role: Rider

Floyd Alfred MacFarland (July 9, 1878 – April 17, 1915) was an American track cyclist and pioneer of six-day racing.

== Career ==
MacFarland competed mainly in sprint events early in his career, having won the national championships in this discipline. One of his biggest rivals was Major Taylor, whose grandparents had been slaves. MacFarland, who was the descendant of a Virginia plantation owner, was known to be racist. He even founded his own national racing association, the Cycle Racing Association, to exclude Taylor from competitions.

In the following years, MacFarland concentrated on six-day races and Madison races.

After retiring from competition, he became one of the leading race promoters and managers in the nation up until his death in 1915.

== Death ==
In April 1915, MacFarland was stabbed to death with a screwdriver while training at the Newark Velodrome, after being involved in a dispute with David Lantenberg, a refreshments seller who had used screws to put up a billboard by the track. MacFarland, who was the director of the track, had forbidden this as the screws would often come loose and pose a danger to cyclists. When MacFarland tried to take the screwdriver from Lantenberg, the latter accidentally stabbed him in the back of the head with the tool; horrified by his own deed, Lantenberg took MacFarland to the hospital in his car, however he died there. 1,500 people followed the funeral procession at the funeral. Lantenberg was charged with manslaughter but acquitted in June of that year.

== Major results ==
1896
1st Sprint, National Amateur Track Championships
1900
1st Six Days of New York (with Harry Elkes)
1901
1st Madison, National Track Championships
1902
1st Six Days of Boston (with Otto Maya)
1904
1st Madison, National Track Championships
1908
1st Six Days of New York (with Jim Moran)
1909
1st Six Days of Berlin (with Jim Moran)
