= Speedwell bicycles =

Australian bicycle brand

- Type: Subsidiary
- Founded: 1882; 144 years ago
- Founder: Charles W. Bennett and Charles R. Wood
- Headquarters: Victoria, Australia
- Area served: Worldwide

Speedwell was a brand of bicycle manufactured by Bennett & Wood, a firm established by Charles W. Bennett and Charles R. Wood in 1882 in Sydney. As motorcars and motorcycles became available Bennett and Wood entered the motor trade. They built and sold the Speedwell bicycle and the Speedwell and Acme motorcycles. The Speedwell motorcycle was built in the early 1900s.

== History ==
Bennett and Wood were accomplished penny-farthing enthusiasts and racers. They were heavily involved in bicycle racing in the Sydney area prior to opening a bicycle shop; Bennett was the intercolonial and NSW champion (1883, 1885). Bennett was a member of a Speedwell bicycle club in England prior to arrival in Australia and for a time raced as a member of that club. He and Wood were involved with the Speedwell bicycle club in Australia, the Cyclists Union of NSW (as competitors and promoters of bicycle racing) and later the League of Wheelmen.

The business opened in 1882 in a humble premises in Clarence Street, in a single fronted two-storey warehouse.

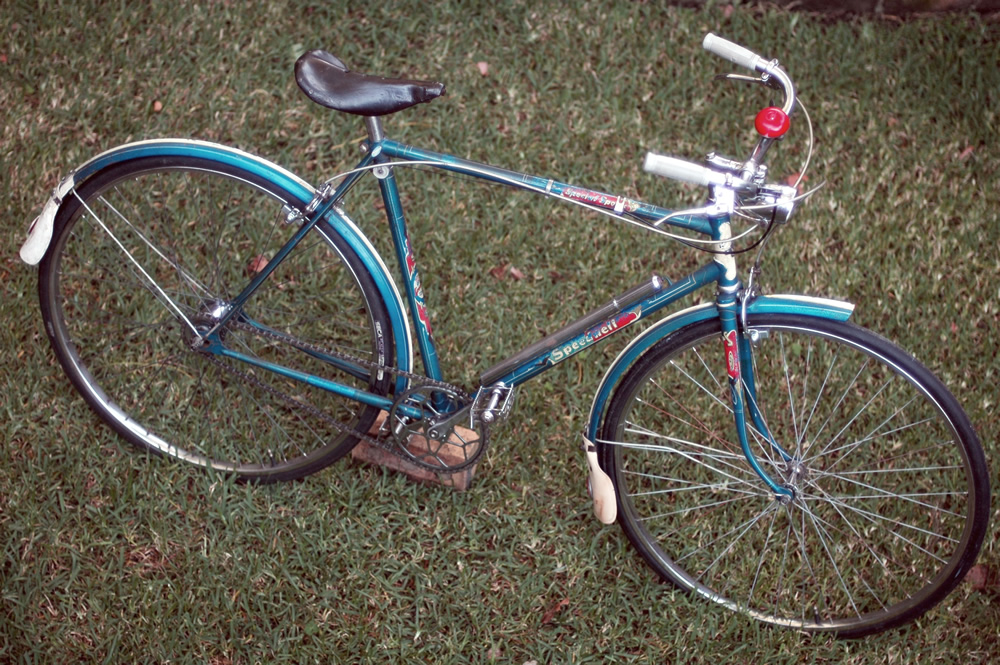
1956 Speedwell Special Sports

Initially they imported and sold machines such as the Rover and Raleigh but they soon commenced local production. Examples of penny-farthings marked Speedwell exist; however, it is unknown if they were locally made or imported. The partnership between Bennett and Wood ended in 1887, with Bennett taking ownership of "Bennett and Wood".

As safety bicycles began to emerge and become popular, Bennett was one of the first in Australia to embrace the new machines and offer them to the public. The business thrived and grew. After making various extensions to their original premises, the business had grown to such an extent that in 1897 it was found necessary to erect a new four-storey building at 397 George Street. These premises were supplemented by workshops in Clarence Street and additional premises in King Street. In 1899 Royal Speedwells were advertised as being made by the Rover Co. Ltd. By the earliest days of the twentieth century Bennett and Wood were manufacturing their own bicycles under the name Speedwell with the Royal Speedwells being the highest quality bikes built. On 1 January 1901 Bennett & Wood Ltd. moved into their new premises, 53 and 55 Market Street. It was only a short time, however, before expansion compelled the firm to occupy Pike's stores at the rear of the Market Street building and also premises in other parts of the same block. The ever-growing popularity and output of Speedwell cycles again rendered it necessary for the company to seek more room.

Speedwell were always supportive of bicycle racing in Australia, donated Royal Speedwells to race winners, and sponsor races (the Speedwell Cup ran from 1906 to at least 1955).

In 1908 the head office of the company was transferred to the large building at the corner of Pitt and Bathurst Streets, designed by the Sydney architect Henry Austin Wilshire. The accommodation was such that it was thought that this building would suffice for all time. This opinion was altered very quickly and the company doubled its frontage in Pitt Street by purchasing the adjoining block. It was later found necessary to expand up Bathurst Street and the adjoining block was also acquired.

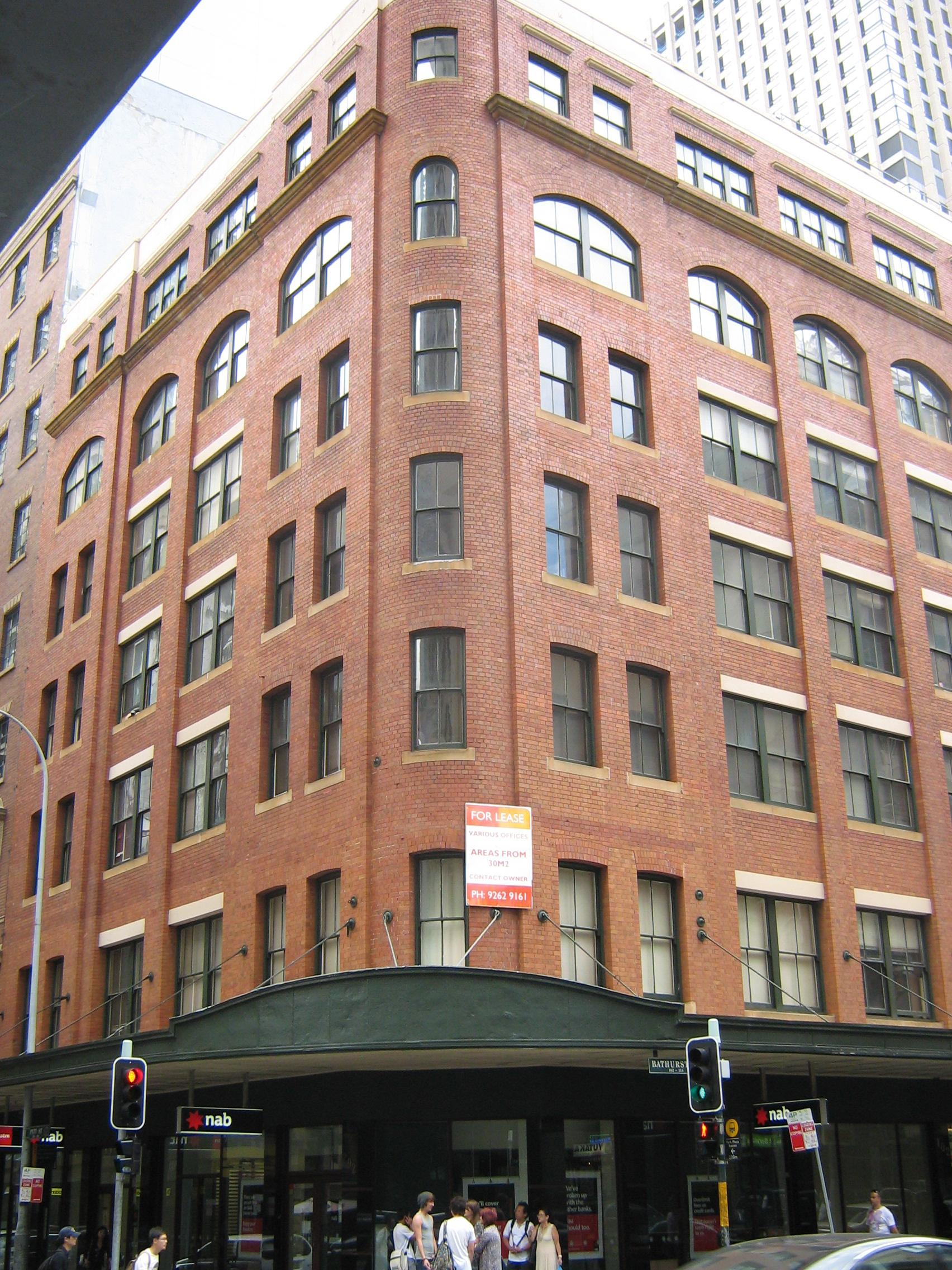
The Speedwell factory and HQ that opened in 1908, as it appeared in 2011; the area was also known as Speedwell Corner

By 1911 Bennett and Wood were advertising that they were the largest bicycle builders in Australasia.

In 1924 Speedwell bikes were exhibited at the British Empire Exhibition in Wembley. They were awarded Wembley Medals, the only bicycles so awarded.

After World War II Bennett and Wood's cycle manufacturing plant was located in the Pitt and Bathurst Street building, but as production increased, a more spacious factory had to be obtained for this section of the business.

A large new factory was built at Redfern and opened c 1951 (Charles Bennett died in November 1947). The new factory in Redfern was state of the art with in-house chrome plating, painting, a canteen and full time first aid staff. They made nearly all of the bicycle in-house, including but not limited to frames, handlebars and stems. The saddles fitted were made by the Australian company Bell Saddles (Pierce Bell trading company of Sydney). In 1951/2 Speedwell were using a new process to paint the frames of the better racing models. This was referred to as translucent, colours being a silver or gold base with translucent colour over the top. Initially this was in blue, green, and red. This was referred to in the US as candy paint by hot rod enthusiasts and applied to cars. By the late 1950s Bennett and Wood had become predominantly a motor trade distribution firm. They, like the Repco Cycle company, had seen the growth in motor vehicle use as the means by which to further develop their business.

By the mid-1960s the downturn in bicycle sales in Australia and the rationalisation of the bicycle industry in Australia had taken its toll on Bennett and Wood. In 1965, they sold the Speedwell brand to General Accessories, the owners of their once great Melbourne based rival Malvern Star (purchased in 1958 from Bruce Small). In a similar way to Malvern Star, bicycle building was phased out from about 1970 in preference to cheaper imports.

== Competitive results ==
In November 1906 the fastest time in the Goulburn to Sydney race was taken by J. O. Burr on a Royal Speedwell. He won another Royal Speedwell for his trouble.

In 1910 E. A. Pearson set a record on a Royal Speedwell for the Sydney to Melbourne ride (565 miles) in a time of 43 hours 18 minutes (actual riding time; overall time 49 hours). This record stood for the next 17 years. Pearson continued to ride his Royal Speedwell and by 1927 had achieved 100,000 miles.

Other Speedwell World Championship riders of the time were:

- Frank Louis Kramer, 1901–16, 1918, 1921. In an undated letter from Australian rider W. Erskine (whilst in the USA) to Bennett and Wood, he wrote "You will be surprised to know that Kramer is riding one of your machines and declares it is the best machine he has ever had. So far he has won two Championships and almost everything he started in. All the best riders in America are on Speedwell's including Reggie McNamara (the best all-rounder here to-day), Alf Goullet, Corry and Grenda (sic)".
- Arthur Spencer, 1917, 1920, 1924
- Ray Eaton, 1919
- Harris Horder, 1927
- Cecil Walker, nine times world's champion. He later opened his own bicycle business in Melbourne.

In 1932 Speedwell rider Edgar "Dunc" Gray won the Olympic time trial by covering a kilometre (1094 yards) unpaced from a standing start in 1 min 13 seconds at Los Angeles, USA. At the time this was a world record. During his long career Gray represented Australia in three Olympic Games, his other appearances being Amsterdam in 1928 and Berlin in 1936. He also rode for Australia in the Empire Games held at Manchester in 1934 and Sydney in 1938. In the former event he won two British Empire Championships. He became an employee at Speedwell building racing bikes (the "Olympic", so named in his honour, was one of the racing models) and promoting for Speedwell. One of his Royal Speedwell bikes is on display at the Dunc Gray Velodrome in Sydney.

Arie van Vliet won the world's professional sprint championship in 1936 and 1938. He visited the factory in Sydney to have his bikes built. This may have been as a result of riding against Dunc Gray in Olympic competition.

== See also ==
- List of Australian bicycle brands and manufacturers
