= 1912 UCI Track Cycling World Championships =

Cycling competition

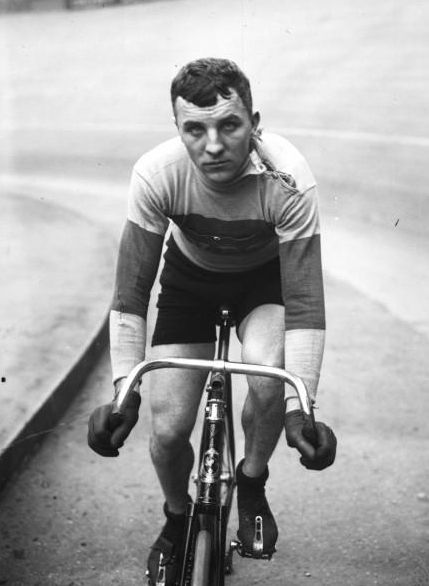
- Wiley in 1913
- Venue: Newark, New Jersey, United States
- Date: 30 August - 4 September 1912
- Velodrome: Newark Velodrome
- Events: 3

The 1912 UCI Track Cycling World Championships were the World Championship for track cycling. They took place in Newark, New Jersey, the United States from 30 August to 4 September 1912. Three events for men were contested, two for professionals and one for amateurs.

== Medal summary ==
Event	Gold	Silver	Bronze
Men's Professional Events
Men's sprint	Frank Kramer; United States	Alfred Grenda; Australia	André Perchicot; France
Men's motor-paced	George Wiley; United States	Elmer Collins; United States	James-Henri Moran; United States
Men's Amateur Event
Men's sprint	Donald McDougall; United States	Harry Kaiser; United States	James Diver; United States

== Medal table ==
Rank	Nation	Gold	Silver	Bronze	Total
1	United States (USA)	3	2	2	7
2	Australia (AUS)	0	1	0	1
3	France (FRA)	0	0	1	1
Totals (3 entries)		3	3	3	9

== See also ==
- Cycling at the 1912 Summer Olympics
