= Gus Lawson =

American cyclist

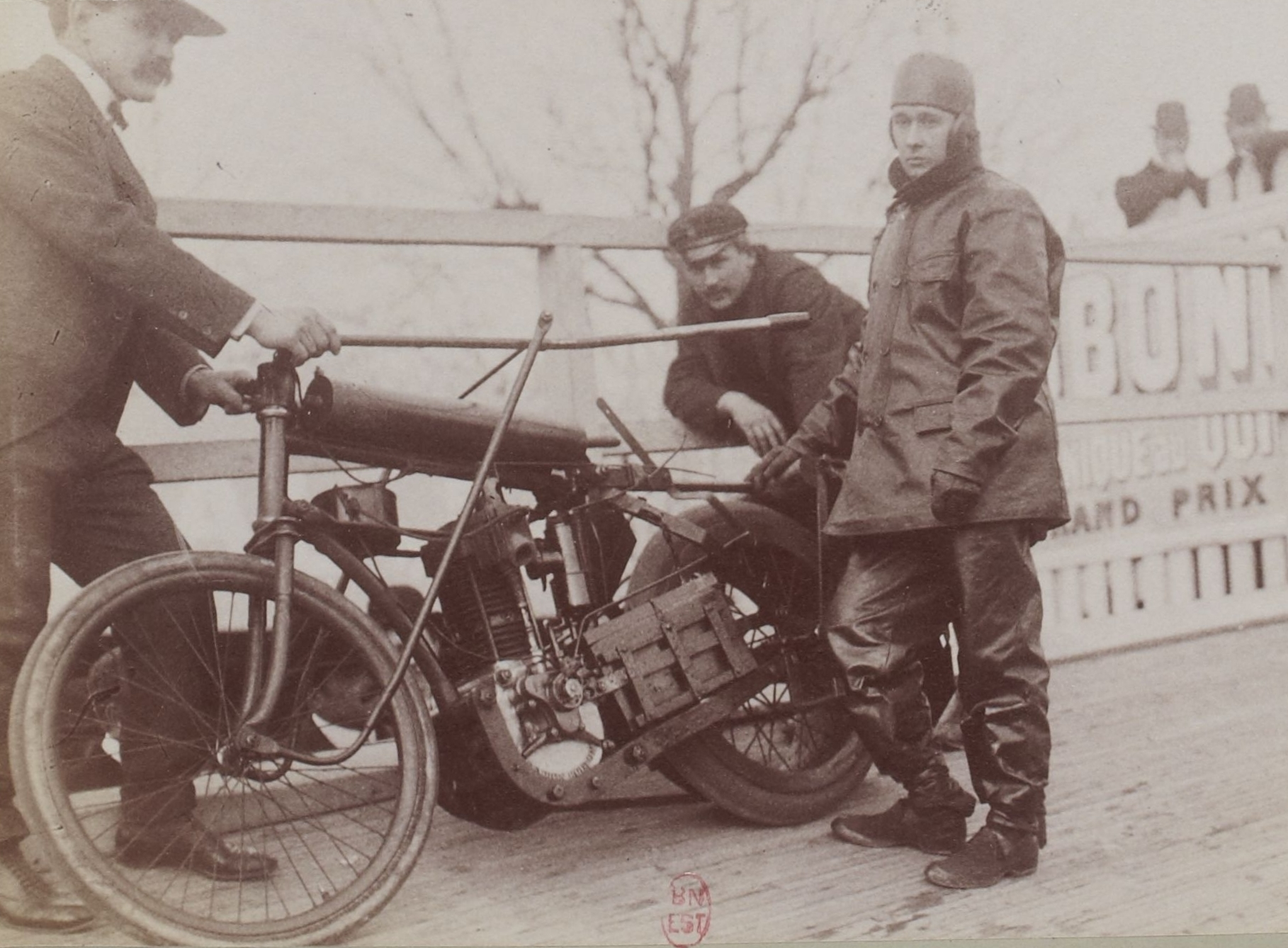
- Lawson with Robert Walthour in 1904
- Born: Gustaf Rudolph Larsson; April 3, 1882; Norrköping, Sweden
- Died: September 8, 1913 (aged 31); Cologne, Germany
- Cause of death: Collision
- Relatives: Iver Lawson, brother John Lawson, brother

Gustaf Rudolf "Gus" Lawson (April 3, 1882 – September 8, 1913) was a record holding professional cyclist who died in a race.

== Biography ==
Gus Lawson was born as Gustaf Rudolph Larsson on April 3, 1882, in Norrköping, Sweden to Lars Gustaf Larsson (1847–c.1940) and Emma Sofia Sundberg (1845–1888). He had two siblings, Iver Lawson and John Lawson, both professional cyclists.

In 1900 he set the indoor 1 hour record by cycling 34 and 5/8 miles.

In 1910 he married Jimmy Michael's widow and Rodolfo Muller's sister Marie Emma Anna Müller.

He died on September 8, 1913, while riding in a 100-kilometer race in Cologne, Germany, when a tire burst on the pace motorcycle he was riding. He fractured his skull and both arms.
