= Ernie Pye =

Australian rules footballer

Personal information
- Full name: Ernest Alfred Pye
- Born: 25 April 1880; Swan Hill, Victoria
- Died: 10 March 1923 (aged 42); Newark, New Jersey, United States

Playing career^{1}
Years	Club	Games (Goals)
1903	St Kilda	2 (0)
- ^{1} Playing statistics correct to the end of 1903.

Ernest Alfred Pye (25 April 1880 – 10 March 1923) was a professional track cyclist and Australian rules football player.

== Australian rules football ==
Ernie Pye started his sports career as an allround athlete, during which he was active as an Australian rules footballer and played with St Kilda in the Victorian Football League (VFL).

== Cycling career ==
But Pye really excelled in cycling. In 1902 and 1903 he won the Australian Natives' Association Wheel race and, after moving to the United States he would find success as a professional track cyclist racing in some of the most prestigious Six-day races of the time with wins in Salt Lake City and top placings in the Six Days of Boston and New York in which he partnered with champions like Alfred Grenda. After his active career he managed the Salt Palace Track in Salt Lake City, before dying in 1923 in Newark.

== Palmares ==
1902

1st A.N.A. Wheel race

1903

1st A.N.A. Wheel race

1906

6th Six Days of New York, with Jack Clark

1911

6th Six Days of New York, with Elmer Collins

1912

3rd Six Days of Boston, with John Bedell
6th Six Days of New York, with Alfred Granda
