= Jan van Hout =

Dutch cyclist (1908–1945)

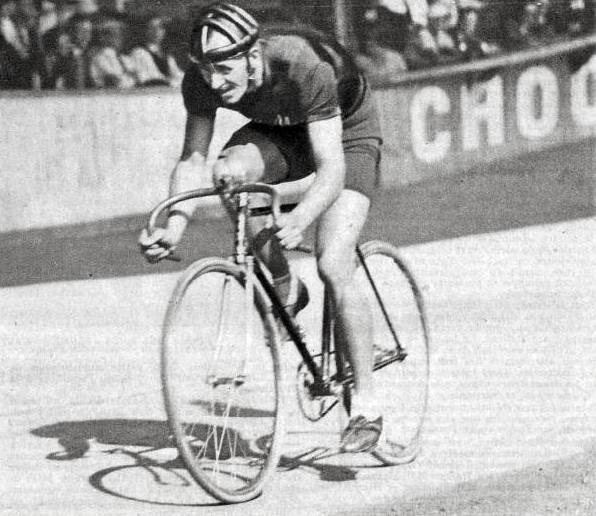
- Van Hout in 1933

Personal information
- Born: 17 October 1908 Valkenburg aan de Geul, Netherlands
- Died: 22 February 1945 (aged 36) Neuengamme concentration camp, Nazi Germany

Cycling career
- Sport: Cycling
- Discipline: Track
- Role: Rider

Jan van Hout (17 October 1908 – 22 February 1945) was a Dutch cyclist. A resistance fighter, he died in the Holocaust.

== Career ==
Van Hout was a cyclist between 1932 and 1940. On 25 August 1933, he set a new hour record at the velodrome in Maasniel, beating the previous record set by Francis Faure in July 1933. Former record holder Oscar Egg disputed the result, claiming that he had measured the course and that van Hout had covered 3.45 metres (11.3 ft) too little each lap. However, there were doubts about the accuracy of Egg's measurement.

== World War II ==
Van Hout used winnings from his career to open a café in Eindhoven. After the German invasion of the Netherlands, van Hout closed his restaurant so that he, a committed anti-fascist, did not have to serve them in his shop. During the occupation, he supported the resistance movement. In 1945, van Hout was arrested by the Gestapo near Eindhoven and deported to Neuengamme concentration camp, where he died on 22 February 1945.

In the 1950s, Anneke van Hout-Louwers, van Hout's widow, stirred controversy by marrying fellow cyclist Cor Wals. Wals was a Waffen-SS serviceman during World War II and was rumoured to have been assigned to Neuengamme to specifically guard van Hout.

== Monument ==
On 15 May 2006, due to promotion by sports journalist Jean Nelissen, a monument to van Hout was erected in his birthplace of Valkenburg. His widow and cyclist Bernard Hinault presented the monument.
