= Archie McEachern =

Canadian cyclist

Personal information
- Born: 25 December 1873 Lindsay, Ontario, Canada
- Died: 13 May 1902 (aged 27) Atlantic City, New Jersey

Cycling career
- Sport: Cycling
- Discipline: Track
- Role: Rider

Archie McEachern (25 December 1873 – 13 May 1902) was a Canadian track cyclist. He was the Canadian National Champion of middle-distance races and was also the first Canadian to win the New York Madison Square Garden Six-Day Bicycle Race, in 1901. In 1902 he broke the world's indoor bicycle record for 5 miles in a motor paced race.

== Biography ==
McEachern was training at the Atlantic City, NJ velodrome prior to it officially opening. During training he was being paced by a tandem motorcycle (driven by his two trainers Bobby Thompson and Alfred Boake). While riding close to his pacers, McEachern was injured when the bike's drive chain broke and died shortly thereafter.

In 1999 the Canadian Cyclist website put McEachern in 9th place on their list of Top 25 Canadian Cyclists of the Century. The Journal of Sport History stated that he "was one of Canada's most famous professional cyclists" of his day.

== Achievements ==
1899
2nd Six Days of New York
1900
2nd Six Days of New York
1901
1st Six Days of New York (with Bobby Walthour

== See also ==
List of racing cyclists and pacemakers with a cycling-related death
