= Paddy Hehir =

Australian cyclist

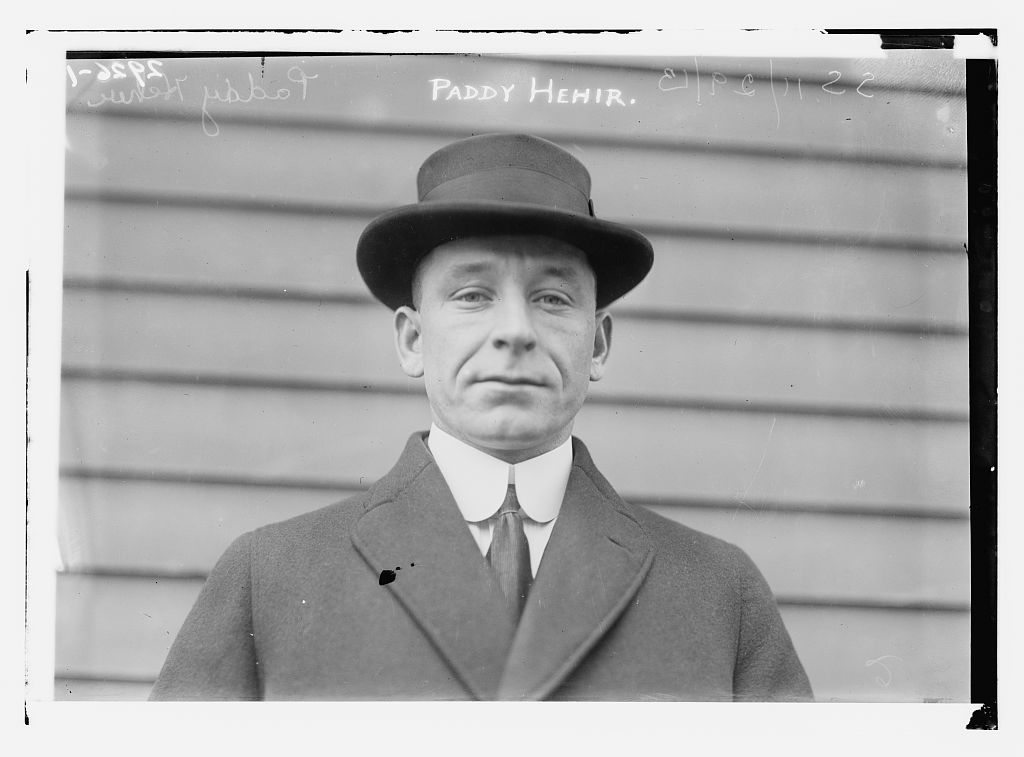

Personal information
- Full name: Patrick O'Sullivan Hehir
- Nickname: Australian Rabbit
- Born: 23 January 1889 Ballarat Australia
- Died: 25 June 1954 (aged 65) Maddingley Australia

Cycling career
- Sport: Cycling
- Discipline: Track
- Role: Rider

Major wins
- Six Days of Sydney (with Alf Goullet), Six Days of Buffalo (with Peter Drobach), Six Days of Newark (with Peter Drobach) and Six Days of Indianapolis (with Peter Drobach)

Patrick O'Sullivan Hehir (1889-1954) was an Australian cycling champion. He participated in the 1912 UCI Track Cycling World Championships at the Newark Velodrome. Hehir won the American Derby event in 1912. He also won the Six Days of Buffalo in 1913 with Peter Drobach. In 1910, Frank L. Kramer beat Hehir in the one-mile open professional event.
