= John Lawson (cyclist) =

Swedish-American professional cyclist (1872–1902)

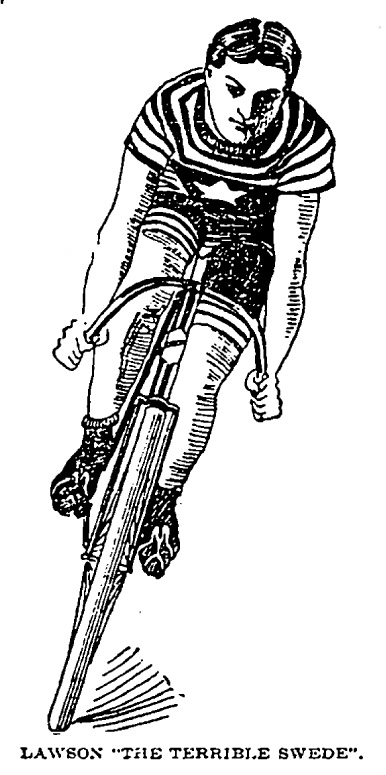
- Born: Jon Anton Larsson; May 13, 1872; Norrköping, Sweden
- Died: March 14, 1902 (aged 29); Milwaukee, Wisconsin, US
- Relatives: Iver Lawson, brother Gus Lawson, brother

John Lawson (May 13, 1872 – March 14, 1902) was a Swedish-American professional cyclist known as "The Terrible Swede".

== Biography ==
John Lawson was born Jon Anton Larsson on May 13, 1872, in Norrköping, Sweden to Lars Gustaf Larsson (1847–c1940) and Emma Sofia Sundberg (1845–1888). He had brothers Iver Lawson and Gus Lawson, both also professional cyclists. In 1897 he contracted typhoid. He was hospitalized with pneumonia and he died on March 14, 1902, at St. Joseph Hospital in Milwaukee, Wisconsin, at age 29.

== See also ==
- Tillie Anderson, a female cyclist also known as the "Terrible Swede"
