= George Leander =

American cyclist (1883–1904)

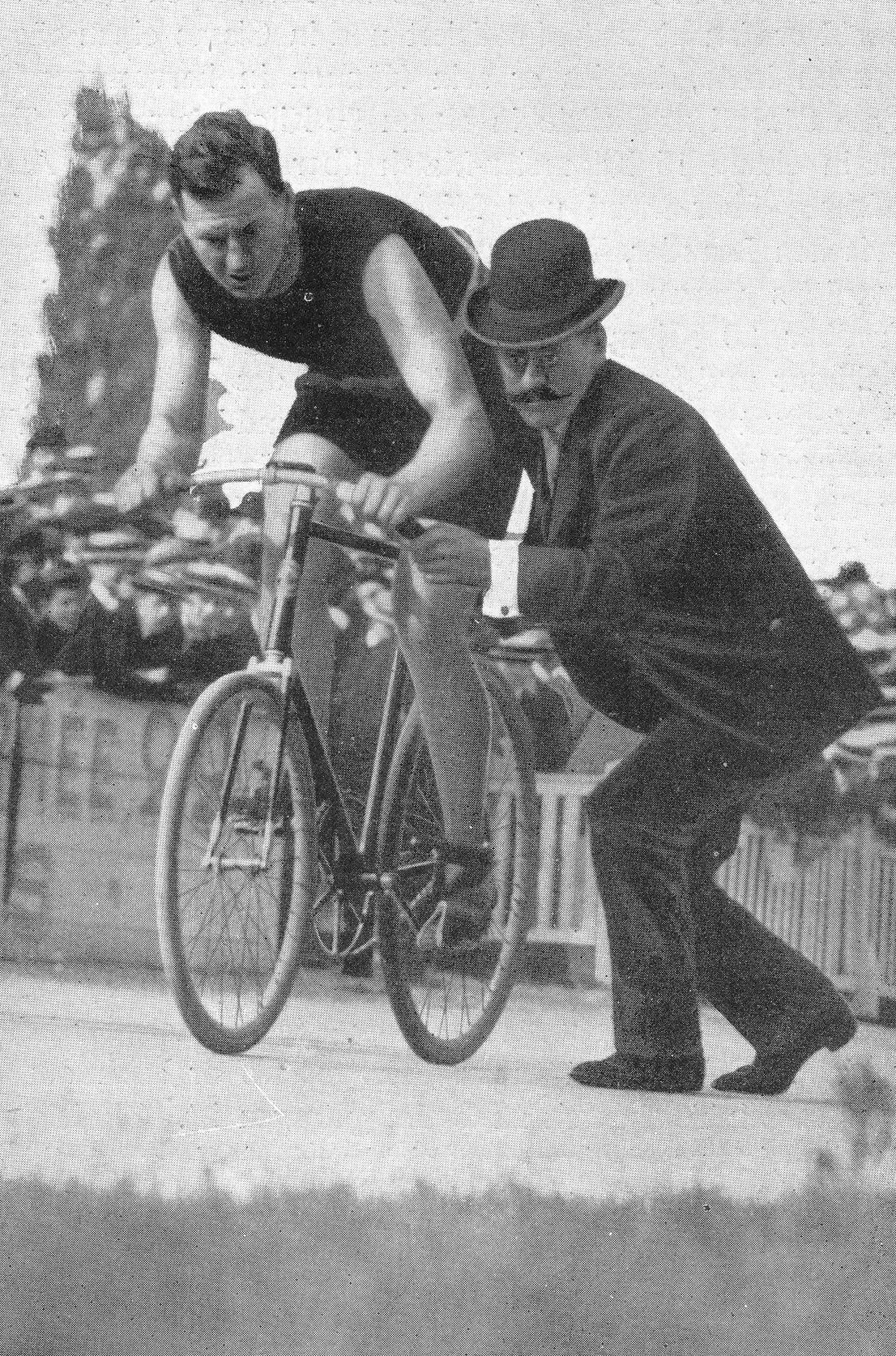

Personal information
- Born: 12 May 1883 Chicago, United States
- Died: 23 August 1904 (aged 21) Paris, France

Sport
- Sport: Track cycling

George Leander (12 May 1883 – 23 August 1904) was an American track cyclist. He became professional in 1902.

Leander was one of the first generation of six-day cyclists. He won the Six Days of New York in 1902 at Madison Square Garden together with Floyd Krebs. He finished second a year later with Nat Butler behind Robert Walthour and Ben Munroe. He became the first American stayer champion in 1903.

Due to his success in the United States, Leander started competing in Europe during the summer of 1904 and won multiple competitions. On 23 August 1904 he died as a result of a fall during a stayer competition in Paris, France, aged 21. While traveling at the rate of 92 kilometres per hour (57 mph), Leander was attempting to pass another cyclist when his bicycle slipped on the track and he had a terrible crash. He was taken to an area hospital but never regained consciousness.

== Achievements ==
1902
3rd - Philadelphia, Six Days, Philadelphia (Pennsylvania)
2nd - Boston, Six Days, Boston (Massachusetts)
1st - New York City, Six Days, New York City (New York) (with Floyd Krebs)

1903
1st - National Championship, Track, Stayers, Elite, United States
2nd - New York City, Six Days, New York City (New York)

== See also ==
- List of racing cyclists and pacemakers with a cycling-related death
