= Velocar =

Historical velomobile

1933 Mochet Velocar

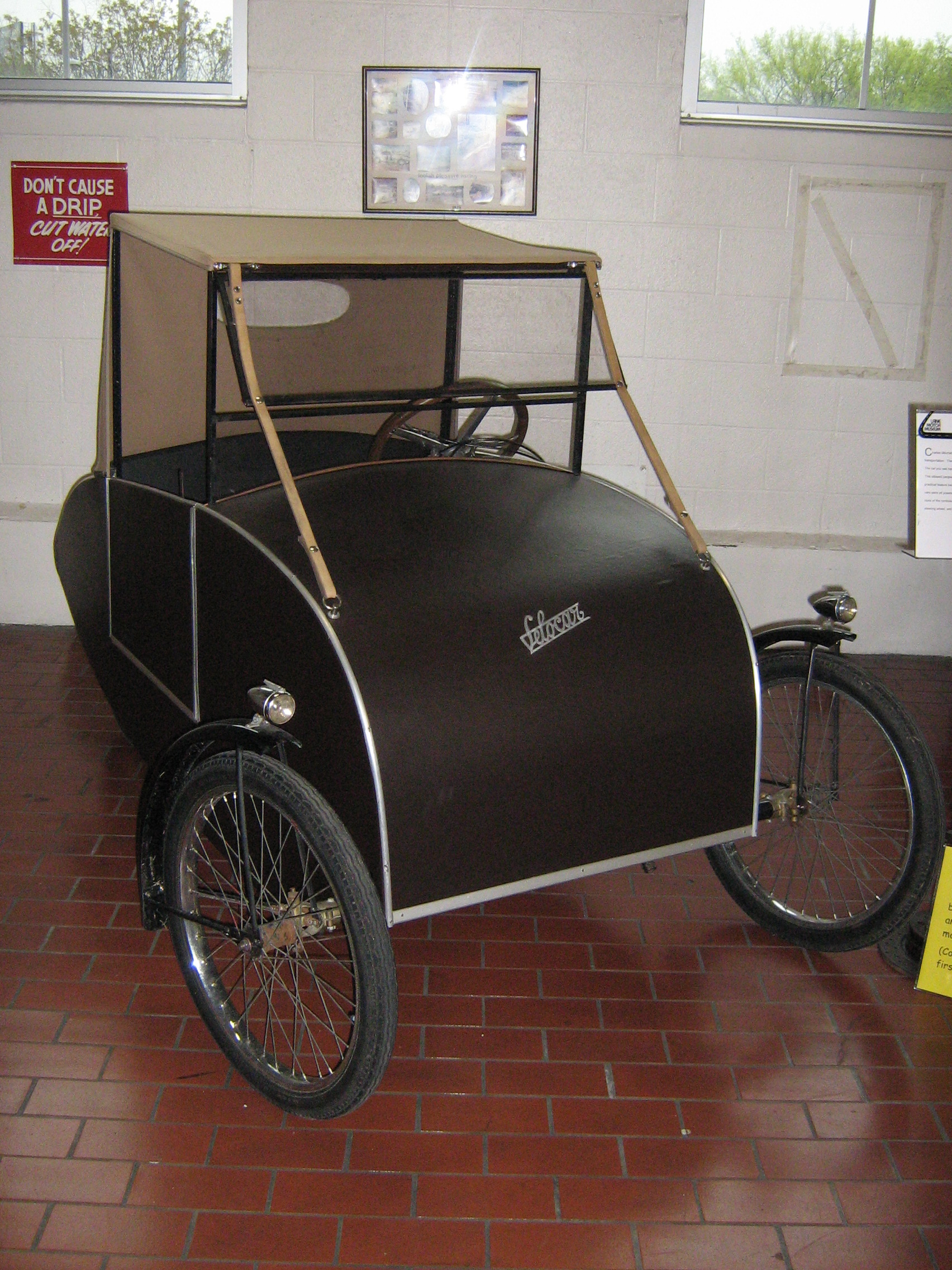
1945 Mochet Velocar

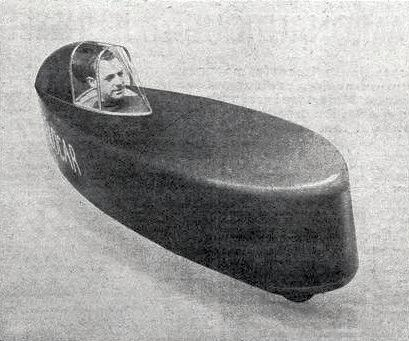
Francis Faure in his world record-setting Velocar in 1938

Velocar was the name given to velomobiles made in the 1930s and 1940s by Mochet et Cie of Puteaux, France and colloquially to the company's recumbent bicycles.

Charles Mochet was the inventive maker of lightweight powered cyclecars (Le P'tit Auto) and pedal-powered cars (quadricycles), mainly two-seaters, built on a tubular-steel chassis with bicycle-sized wheels, variable gears, and aerodynamic bodywork, in effect a faired-in "sociable". The popularity of the little cars declined in the late 1930s as cheaper, powered cars became available, only to rise rapidly when petrol became almost unobtainable during World War II, 1939–1945.

However, Mochet's stroke of genius was to make what was the first performance recumbent bicycle, or vélo couché, using a design that was based on half of his four-wheeled Velocar. This machine, called by the factory the "Velo-Velocar", or "V-V" for short, broke many world cycling records in 1933. Although Mochet had verified with the Union Cycliste Internationale (UCI) and the Union Vélocipédique de France (UVF) that his recumbents were completely legal for competition, they were declared ineligible at a later hearing and permanently banned from competition by cycling's governing body, the UCI, it is thought at the behest of the makers of standard upright cycles. Mochet had perhaps also broken an unspoken rule that only "First-Category" riders could attempt records, his rider, Francis Faure, being only a second-category rider. Competition use was carried on in a limited fashion in UVF-governed events.

Although road and track versions of the recumbents were built in small numbers between 1933 and 1945, as well as, in 1935, a simplified version called the "Velorizontal", and record-breaking continued in non-UCI categories, the Recumbent impetus was lost after the war, the last Mochet model being the 1940 version of the "Vélorizontal". Around 35 Mochet recumbents survive (2011) in museums and private collections.

Re-discovery of the Mochet concept in California in the late 1970s led to the subsequent development of recumbent cycles that took place in the US in the 1980s.

Mochet had died suddenly in 1934 just after the UCI ban and the business was carried on by his widow and his son Georges. After the war, Georges continued making mainly powered microcars in the "Sans Permis" category from 1945 to 1957. Georges Mochet died in 2008.

== See also ==
- Go-kart
- Mochet's Velocar
- Model car
- Velomobiles
