= André Perchicot =

French cyclist and singer (1888–1950)

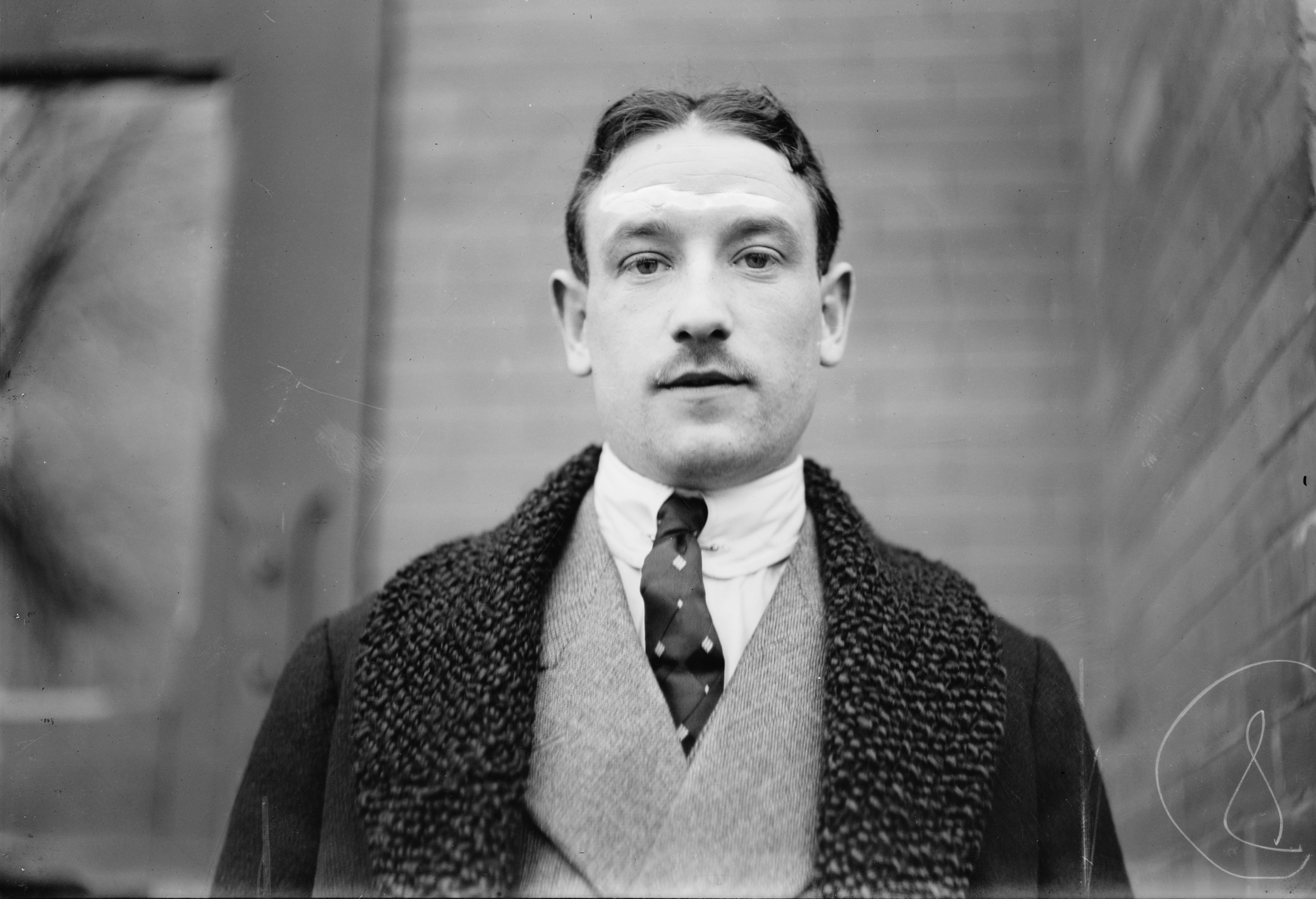
André Perchicot

André Perchicot (French: [ɑ̃dʁe pɛʁʃiko]; August 9, 1888 – May 3, 1950) was a French cyclist who won the bronze medal at the 1912 UCI Track Cycling World Championships – Men's Sprint in Newark, New Jersey and the 1912 French National Track Championships.

== Biography ==
He was born on August 9, 1888. In 1912 in Newark, New Jersey the gold medal was won by Frank Louis Kramer. Alfred Grenda of Austria, won the silver medal.

He served in World War I as a pilot and his plane was shot down in 1916. At the end of the war he began a singing career. He travelled the world, touring in Europe, Africa and Middle-East until the late 1930s. He died on May 3, 1950.
