= Iver Lawson (cyclist) =

American professional track cyclist

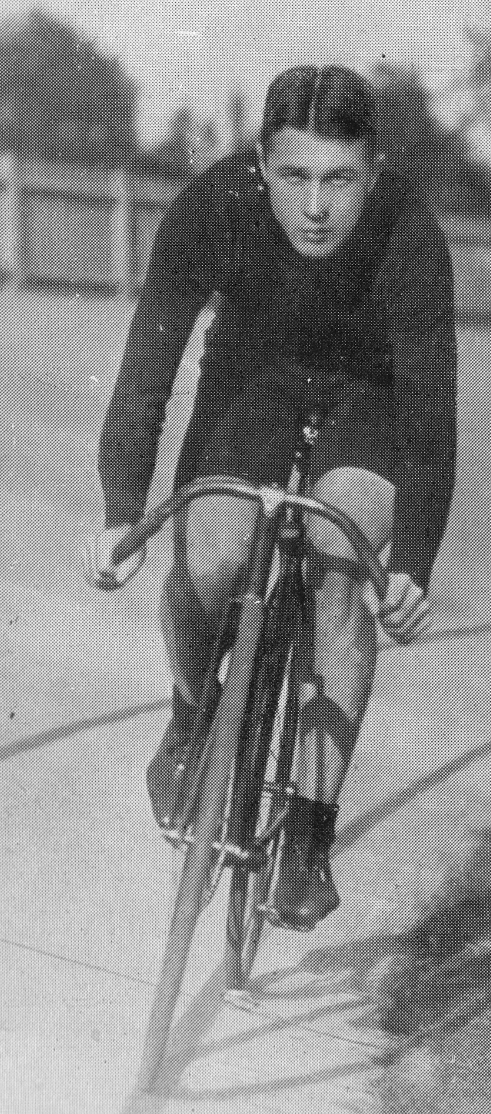

Personal information
- Full name: Iver Georg Lawson
- Born: July 1, 1879 Norrköping, Sweden
- Died: November 9, 1960 (aged 81) Provo, Utah, U.S.

Cycling career
- Sport: Cycling
- Discipline: Track
- Role: Rider
Medal record
Men's track cycling
Representing United States
World Championships
Gold medal – first place	1904 London	Sprint

Iver Georg Lawson (July 1, 1879 – November 9, 1960) was an American professional track cyclist. He won the sprint event at the 1904 UCI Track Cycling World Championships.

== Biography ==
Iver Lawson was born on July 1, 1879, in Norrköping, Sweden to Lars Gustaf Larsson and Emma Sofia Sundberg. He had two brothers, Gus Lawson and John Lawson.

In 1901 Lawson won the ten-mile championship in Buffalo, New York. In 1902 he lost to Frank Louis Kramer.

In 1905 Lawson also won the National Cycle Association's quarter-mile championship race at Vailsburg in Newark, New Jersey.

In an incident, which occurred in February 1904 at an event in Australia, Major Taylor (an African American cyclist) was seriously injured on the final turn of a race when fellow competitor Lawson deliberately veered his bicycle toward Taylor and collided with his front wheel. Taylor crashed and lay unconscious on the track before he was taken to a local hospital and later made a full recovery. Lawson was suspended from racing anywhere in the world for a year as a result of his actions.

Lawson died on November 9, 1960, in Provo, Utah, after falling from a window.
