= Mochet =

French automobile manufacturer

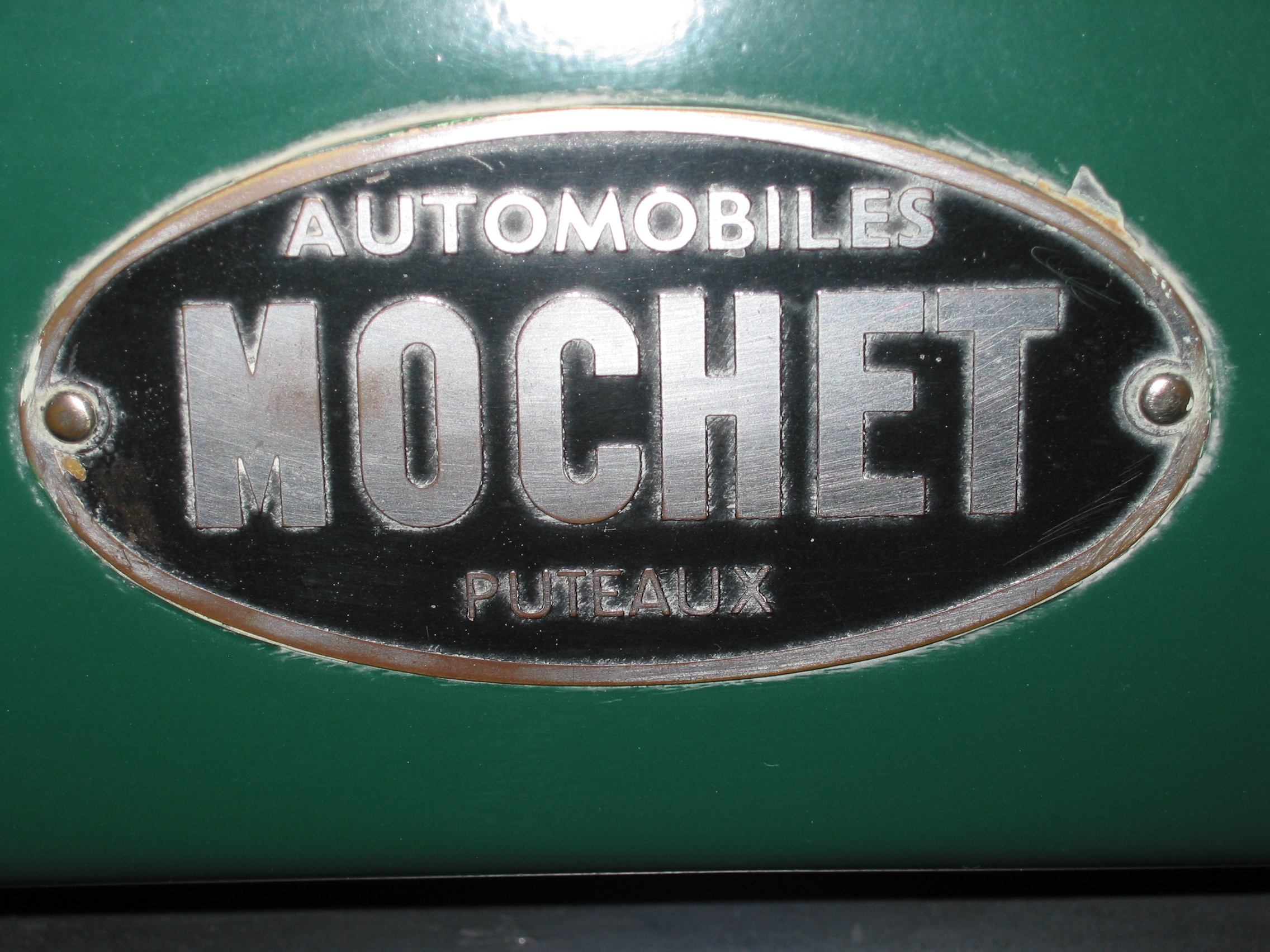
Emblem

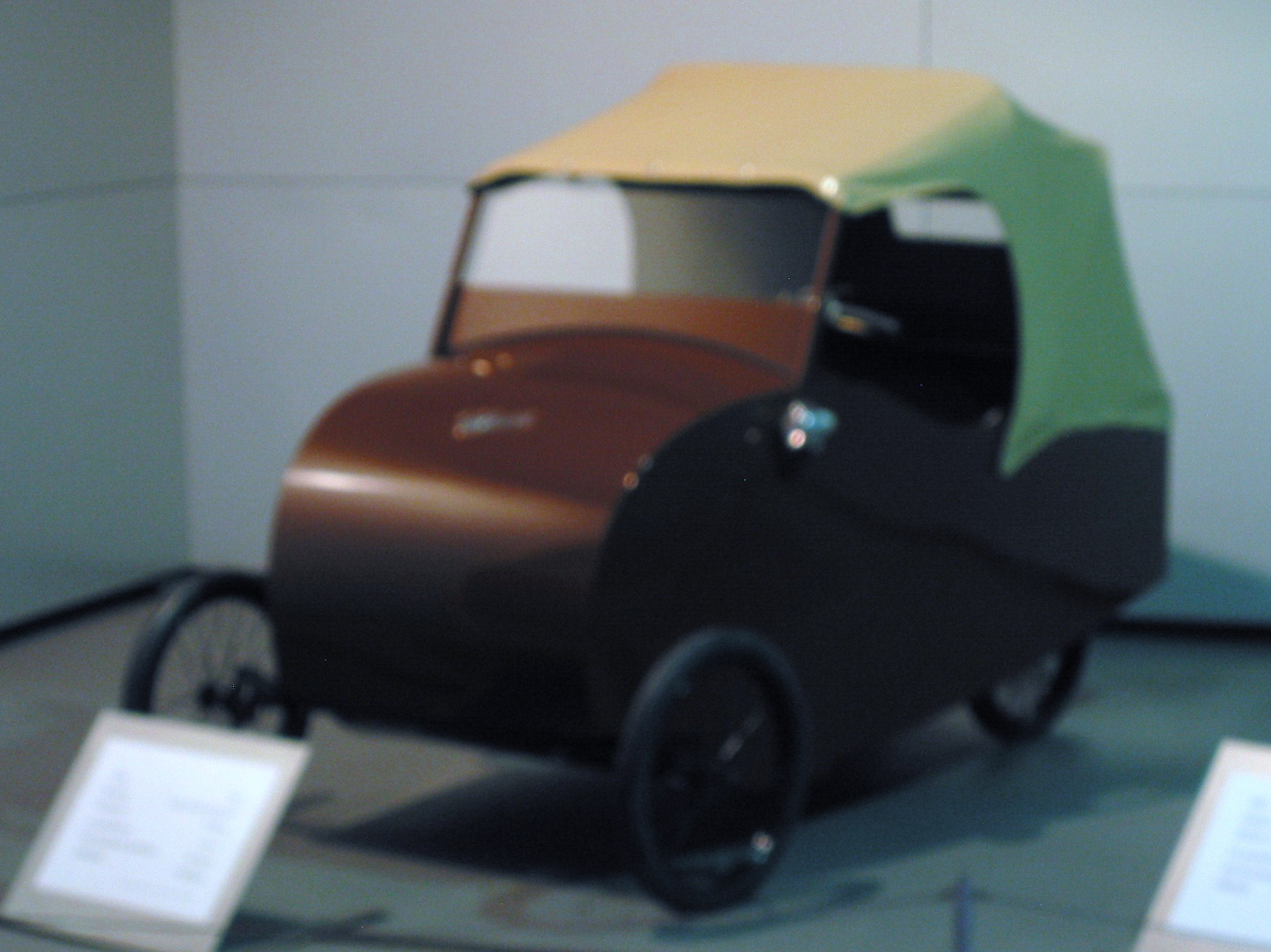
Mochet of 1947

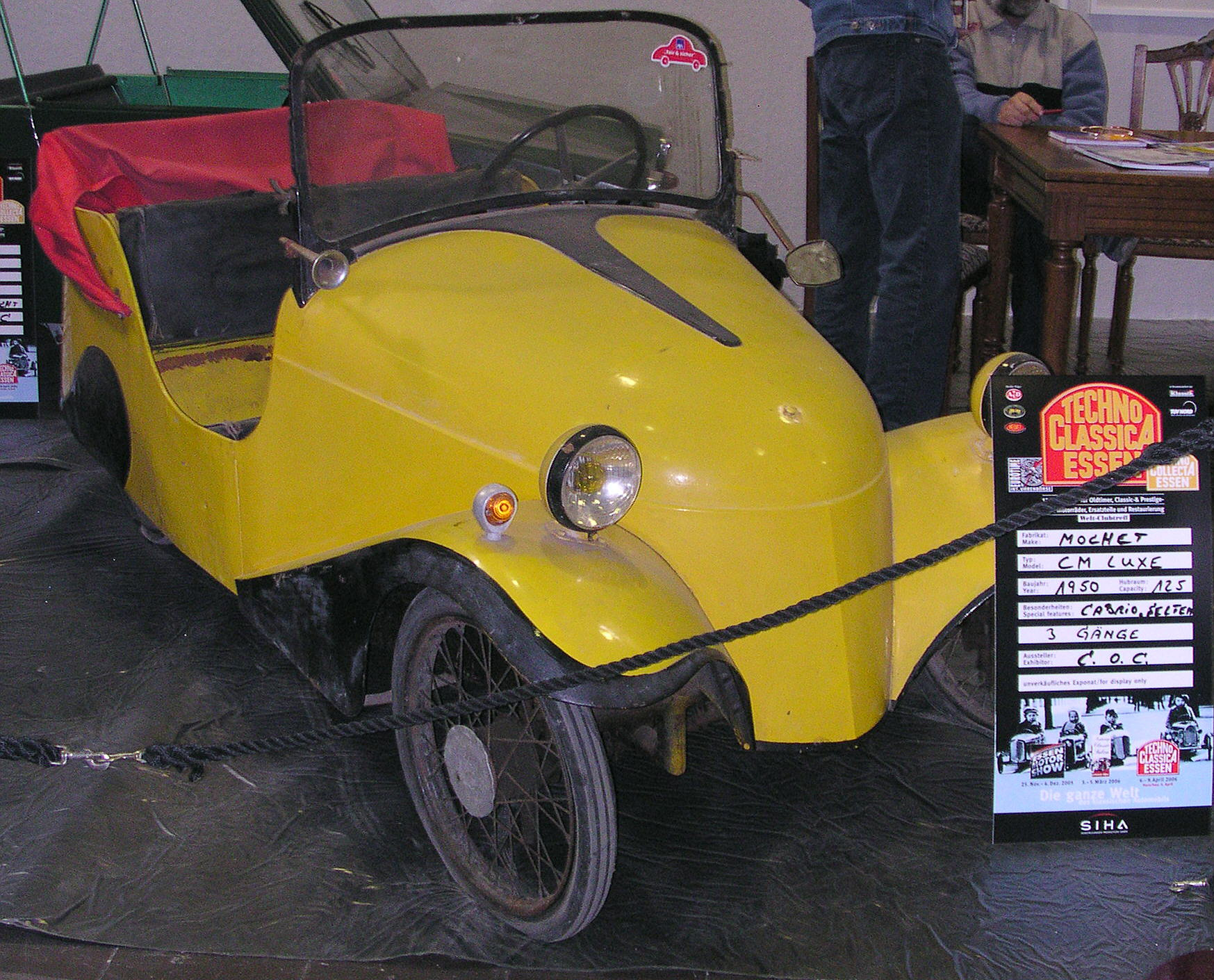
Mochet CM Luxe, of 1950

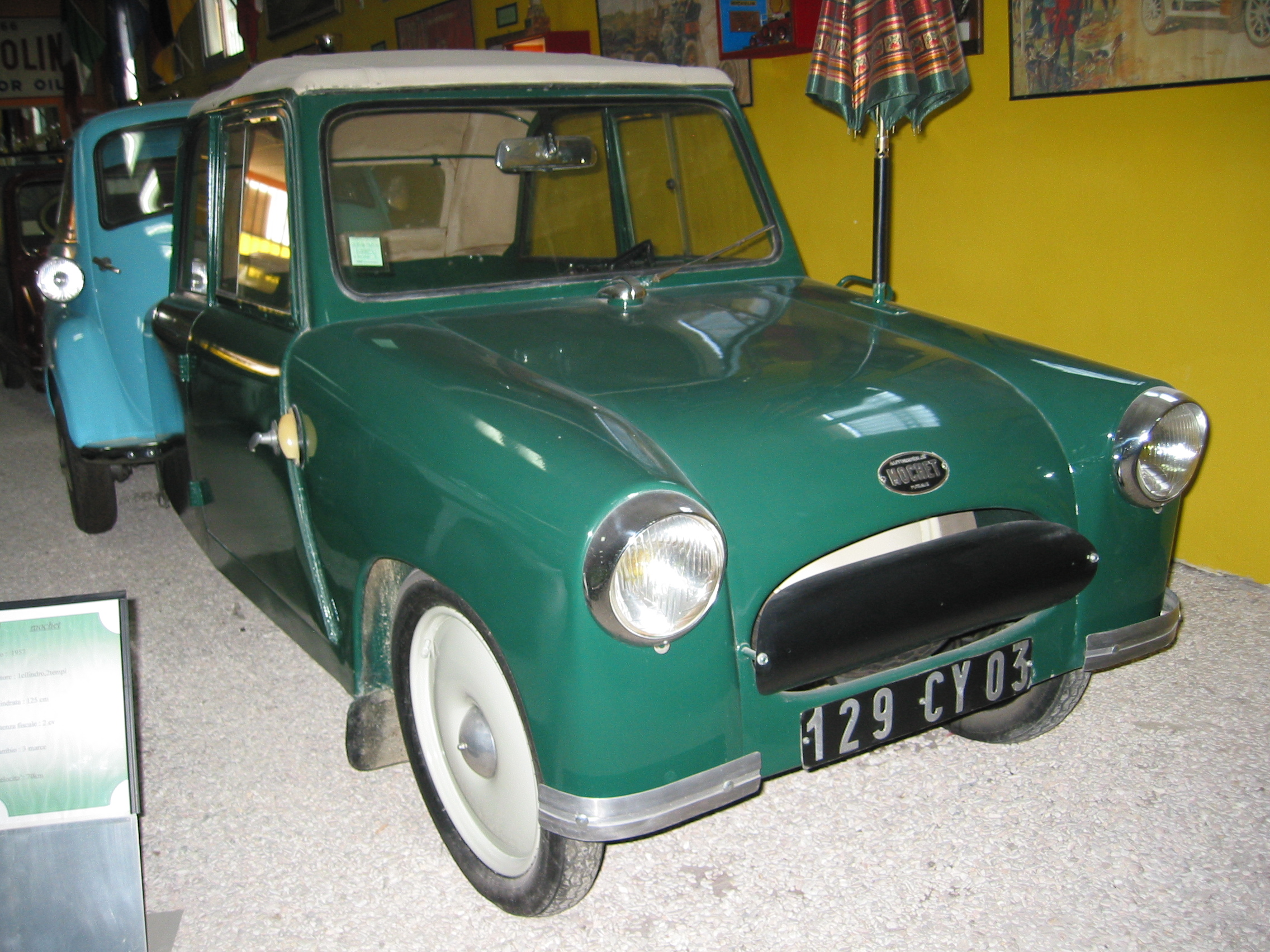
Mochet of 1957

Georges Mochet began to produce cycle-cars at his, now-demolished, premises at 68, Rue Roque-de-Fillol at Puteaux in approximately 1946 and by about 1952 had progressed to more modern looking two seater micro-cars and powered two-wheelers. In 1958, with approximately 3,000 vehicles manufactured, production ended.

Georges had inherited the business from his father, Charles Mochet (1880–1934) under whose leadership it had, after the First World War, produced children's’ pedal cars and, between 1924 and 1934, the 'Vélocar' lightweight, pedal-powered, cycle-car. In 1934, the firm's revolutionary 'Vélo-Vélocar' recumbent bicycles, ridden to record-breaking speeds by Francis Faure, were banned from cycling competitions by the Union Cycliste Internationale. Charles Mochet died soon after.

The continuation of recumbent cycle production and of the cycle-cars, popular in occupied, no-petrol France, and the subsequent switch to micro-cars under Georges after the Second World War was therefore a direct evolution from the pre-war business built up by his father.

The “Type CM Grand luxe” for 1953 retained the 125 cc and added a new “ponton” format body, with headlights set into the front wings. The Mochet now looked like a normal car, but smaller, at just 2550 mm long and 1130 mm wide, recalling the pedal cars produced under the patron's father before the First World War. Despite the modern body-work the 1953 “CM Grand Luxe” retained the same 1700 mm wheelbase and 980 mm front-track of the original “Type K” cycle-car.

In October 1953, at the Paris Motor Show, Mochet exhibited a modern looking small cabriolet bodied car closer in size to a (small) normal car. The car was powered by a twin cylinder 748cc unit providing a claimed 40 hp of output. The unit was based on the engines used by the BMW motor bikes used by the police. However, this Mochet 750 never progressed beyond the prototype stage.

== See also ==
- Velomobile
