= Peter Drobach =

American cyclist (1890–1947)

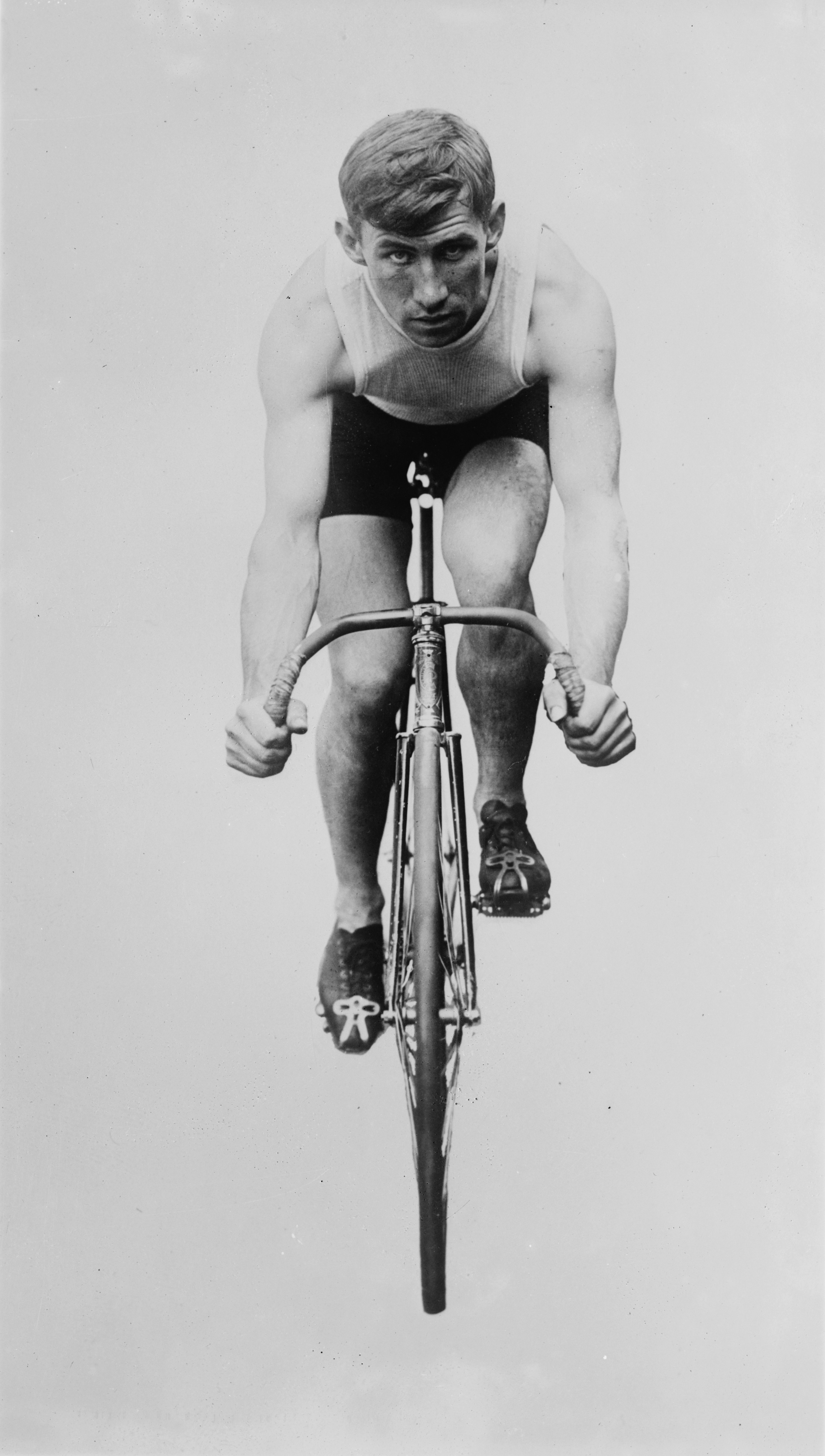

Personal information
- Full name: Peter A. Drobach
- Born: United States

Cycling career
- Sport: Cycling
- Discipline: Track
- Role: Rider

Major wins
- Six days of Buffalo 2 times

Peter Anthony Drobach, Sr. (November 23, 1890 – November 24, 1947) was an American track cyclist who was a professional rider between 1908 and 1922. Especially in the 1910s, he enjoyed many successes in six-day racing.

== Major victories ==
1910
Six Days of Buffalo (with Alfred Hill)
1913
Six Days of Buffalo (with Paddy Hehir)
Six Days of Newark (with Paddy Hehir)
Six Days of Indianapolis (with Paddy Hehir)
