= Marcel Berthet =

French cyclist

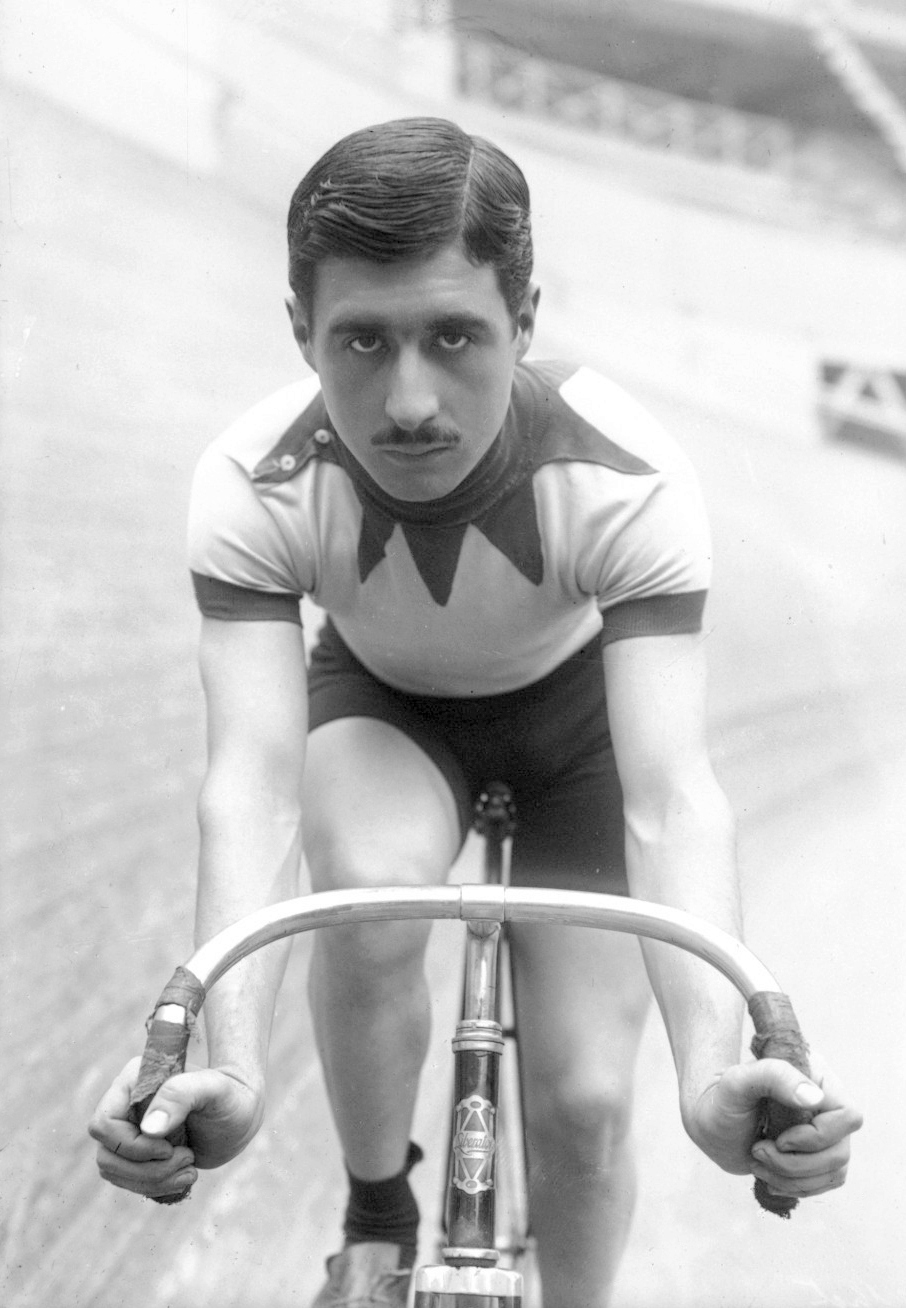
- Marcel Berthet in 1912

Personal information
- Born: 4 March 1887 Neuilly-sur-Seine, France
- Died: 7 April 1953 (aged 65) Rouen, France

Sport
- Sport: Cycling

Marcel Berthet (4 March 1887 – 7 April 1953) was a French cyclist who rode professionally between 1907 and 1923. He took part in the 1908 Tour de France, and set multiple records in one-hour ride in 1907, 1912 and 1913. He won the six-day race of Brussels in 1921 and finished second in 1920. His brother Ernest Berthet was also a competitive cyclist.
