= Harry Elkes =

American cyclist

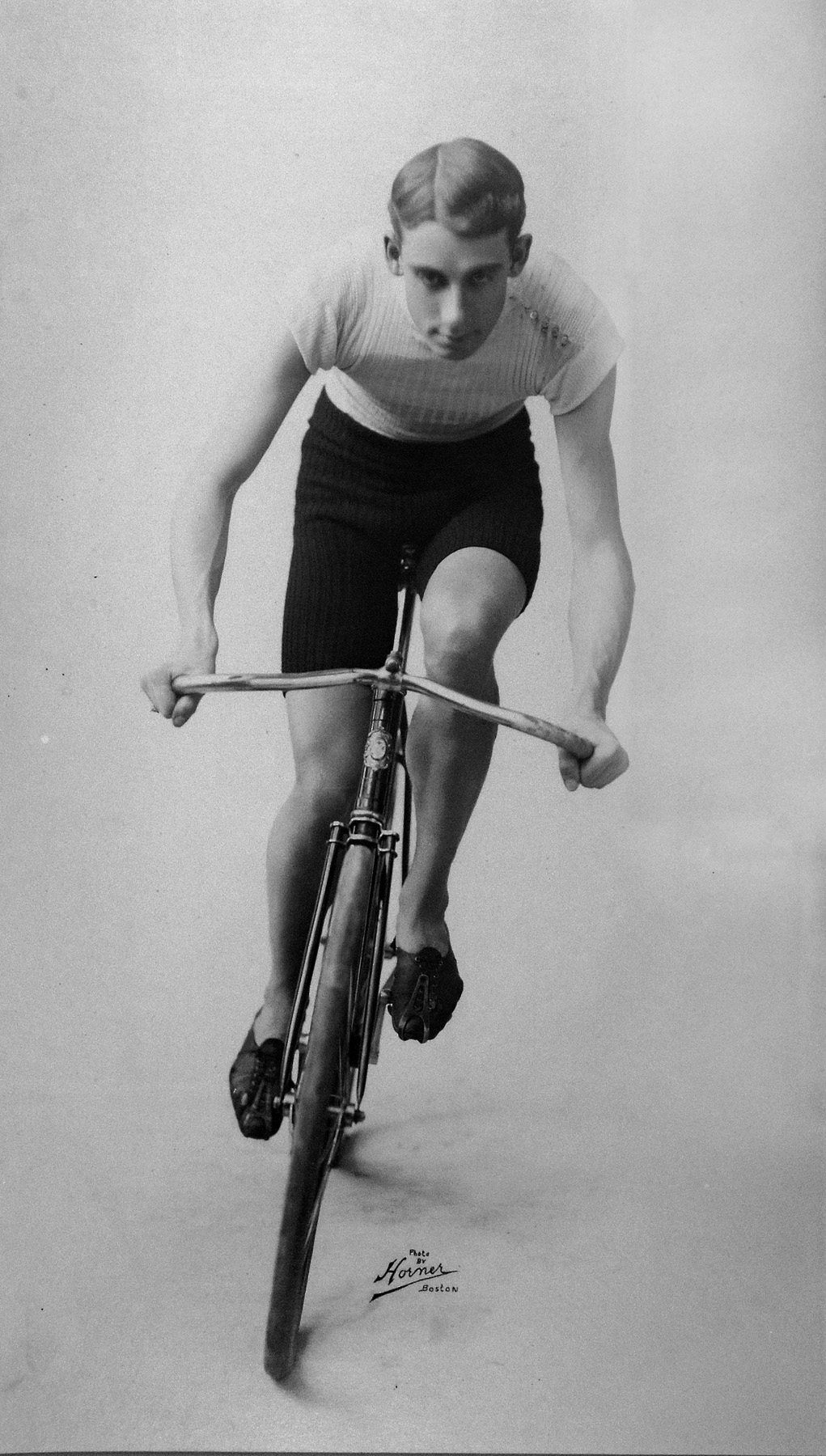
- Harry Elkes in Boston, Massachusetts

Personal information
- Full name: Harry D. Elkes
- Born: 28 February 1878 Port Henry, New York, United States
- Died: 30 May 1903 (aged 25) Boston, United States

Cycling career
- Sport: Cycling
- Discipline: Track
- Role: Rider
- Rider type: Middle-distance

Harry D. Elkes (28 February 1878 – 30 May 1903) was an American cyclist. He was professional from 1897 until his death in 1903.

Elkes held the world record for "paced-cycle racing" during most of his career and just prior to his fatal accident had achieved a new 5 Miles World Record (going that distance in 6 minutes, 12 1/5 seconds) as well as achieving world's records for 10 and 15 miles. Major Taylor called Elkes in his autobiography "one of the greatest middle-distance riders that ever pedalled a bicycle."

Elkes died in an cycling accident at Charles River Track in Cambridge, Massachusetts, aged 25.

== See also ==
- List of racing cyclists and pacemakers with a cycling-related death
