= Francis Faure =

French cyclist

Francis Faure (1910, Ambert – 1948) was a French bicycle racer who captured the world hour record in July 1933 on a Vélocar. This prompted the Union Cycliste Internationale (UCI) to restrict bicycle designs for all future competitions.

== Early life ==
Francis was brother of Benoît Faure and Eugène Faure.

== 1933 ==
On July 7, 1933, Faure rode a Vélocar developed by Charles Mochet in the Vélodrome d'Hiver in Paris, and he beat the hour record of 44.247 km set by Oscar Egg on August 18, 1914, by 0.808 km. At the time, Faure was considered a "second-rate" cyclist and was not Mochet's first choice. The unfaired, or "stock" recumbent record stood until it was broken in 2007 by an "unclassified" racer Sean Costin, who covered 48.80 km (28.46 mi) on the 382m outdoor concrete velodrome in Northbrook, Illinois. He rode a recumbent made by the Polish manufacturer Velokraft (model name NoCom), which he converted to a fixed-gear for the indoor event.

== 1938 ==
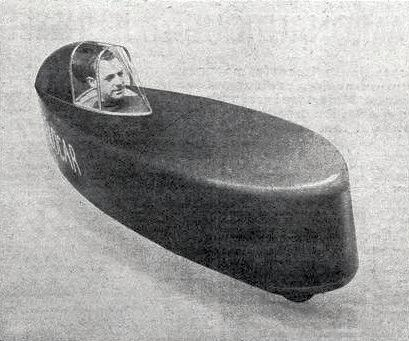
Francis Faure in his streamlined Vélocar in 1938

In 1938, Faure rode an updated, streamlined Vélocar to become the first cyclists to exceed 50 km in one hour, but this record is unofficial because of the UCI ban on non-traditional designs. This record was not broken on a conventional bicycle until Francesco Moser rode one for 51.151 km in 1984.

== Postscript ==
Faure moved to Australia when WWII started, and died there in 1948.
