= Alfred Grenda =

Australian track cyclist

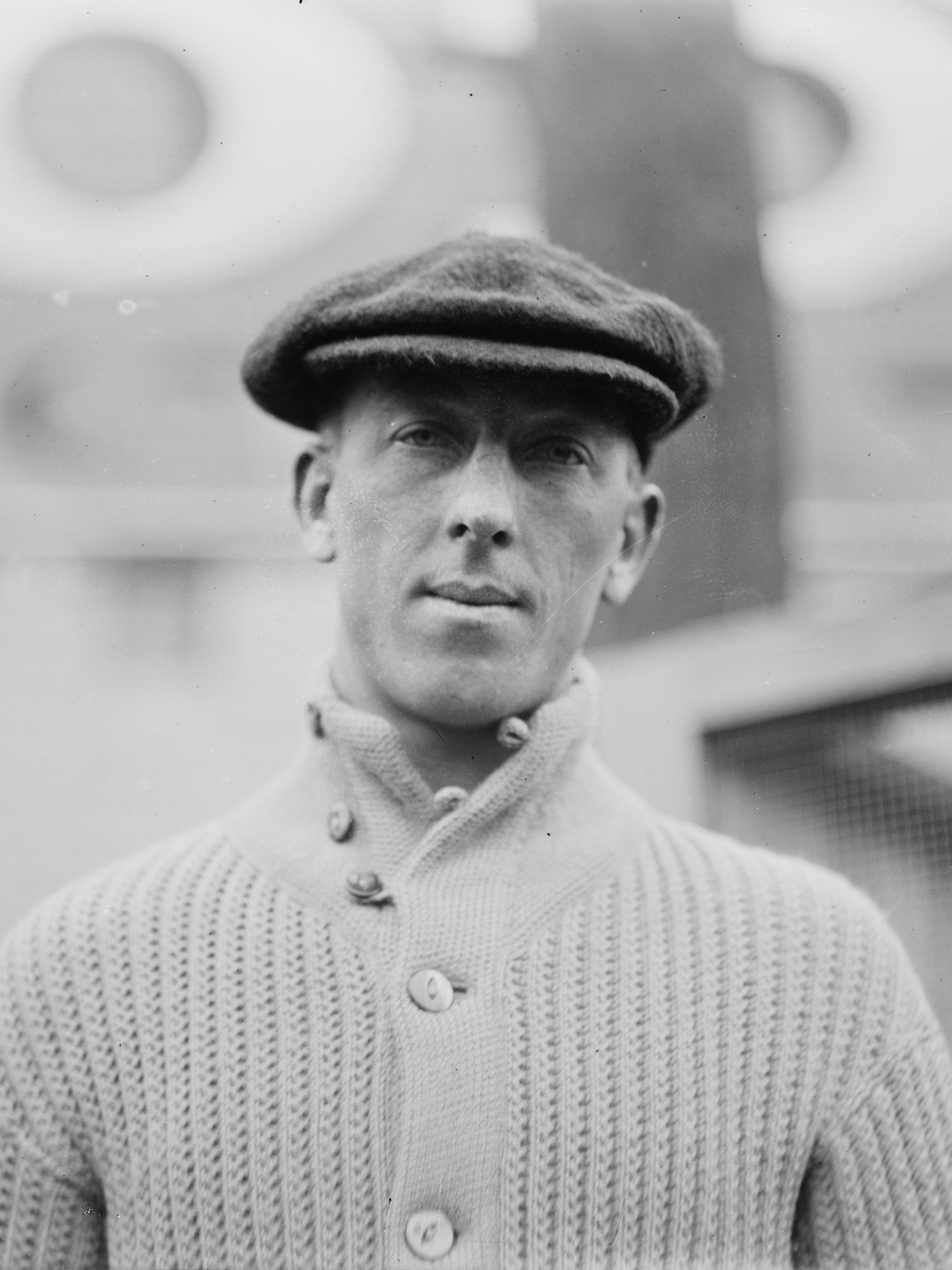
- Grenda in 1912

Personal information
- Full name: Alfred Francis Grenda
- Nickname: The Tall Tasmanian
- Born: September 15, 1889 Launceston, Tasmania, Australia
- Died: May 30, 1977 (aged 87) Paradise, California, United States

Cycling career
- Sport: Cycling
- Discipline: Track
- Role: Rider
- Rider type: Six-day
Medal record
Men's track cycling
Representing Australia
World Championships
Silver medal – second place	1912 Newark	Sprint

Alfred Francis Grenda (September 15, 1889 – May 30, 1977) was an Australian professional track cyclist, who specialized in six-day races. He won eight in his career, including the Six Days of New York four times. He also competed in sprinting, notably winning the silver medal at the 1912 UCI Track Cycling World Championships. He came to the United States under a professional contract in 1912, where he stayed and became a naturalized citizen in 1930.

== Major results ==
1912
2nd Sprint, UCI Track World Championships
1913
1st Six Days of Toronto (with Ernie Pye)
1914
1st Six Days of New York (with Alf Goullet)
1915
1st Six Days of New York (with Alfred Hill)
1st Six Days of Boston (with Alfred Hill)
1916
1st Six Days of Boston (with Alf Goullet)
1922
1st Six Days of New York (with Reginald McNamara)
1923
1st Six Days of New York (with Alf Goullet)
1924
1st Six Days of Chicago (with Oscar Egg)
