= Newark Velodrome =

Former cycling track in Newark, New Jersey

- Interactive map of Newark Velodrome
- Location: South Orange Avenue; Newark, New Jersey
- Coordinates: 40°44′42.89″N 74°13′3.10″W
- Capacity: 12,500
- Surface: Wood (Track); Grass (Infield)

Construction
- Opened: 1911
- Demolished: 1930

Tenants
- Various cycling events (1911–1930); Newark Tornadoes (NFL) (1930)

The Newark Velodrome was a wooden bicycle track in the Vailsburg neighborhood of Newark, New Jersey, located at the northeast corner of the intersection of South Orange Avenue and Munn Avenue. It opened in 1911 and measured six laps to the mile, or 293 yards per lap. It replaced another 1/6-mile wooden velodrome that was located to the south, in the northwest corner of the current Vailsburg Park. That velodrome opened on May 10, 1908, and replaced a 1/4-mile wooden velodrome that had opened in 1897 on the same site.

The Newark Tornadoes of the National Football League also played several "home" games on the track's grassy infield during the 1930 season, while the other "home" games were played at Newark Schools Stadium.

== Football ==
The Tornadoes played two NFL games at the Velodrome in 1930, both defeats for Newark. On October 19, the Brooklyn Dodgers beat the Tornadoes, 14–0; a week later on October 26, the Staten Island Stapletons downed Newark, 6–0.

== Cycling ==
The 1912 UCI Track Cycling World Championships were held in Newark. The event was sanctioned by the Union Cycliste Internationale, the world governing body for the cycling sport. The 1912 event was estimated to draw 20,000 fans, even though the seating capacity of the venue was just 12,500. Frank Louis Kramer won a gold medal in the professional men's sprint at the venue that year. Australian cyclist, Reggie McNamara set five world records from one to 25 miles at the velodrome in 1915, 1916, and 1917.

== Demolished ==
The Newark Velodrome closed in 1930 after its lease expired and was demolished on December 4, 1930.

== See also ==
- New York Velodrome

Preceded by Newark Schools Stadium	Home of the Orange A.C.- Orange/Newark Tornadoes; 1930	Succeeded by Knights of Columbus Stadium
