= Bobby Walthour =

American professional cyclist (1878–1949)

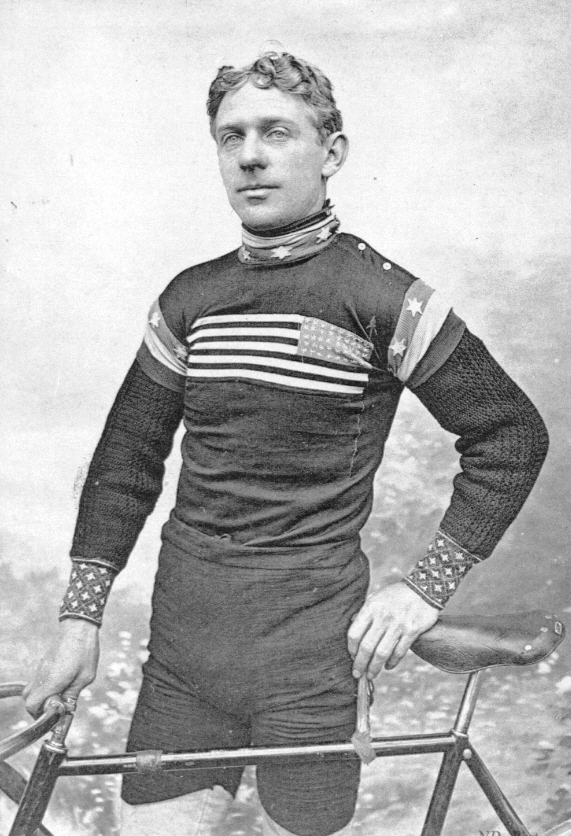
Bobby Walthour (~1903)

Robert Howe Walthour Sr. (1 January 1878 – 1 September 1949) was one of the best American professional cyclists of his era.

== Career summary ==
Bobby Walthour started his career as a sprinter and developed into a formidable six-day rider, but achieved his greatest fame as a fearless motor-pacer. Walthour turned professional in 1896. He won America's greatest race, the six-day race inside Madison Square Garden, with his partner, Canadian Archie McEachern, in 1901. Walthour again won at the Garden in 1903 with fellow American southerner Bennie Munroe. In 1902 and 1903 Walthour won American motor-paced championships. Walthour won the motor-pacing World Championships in 1904 in London and in 1905 in Brussels. Walthour's cycling career continued until the early 1920s.

== Beginnings ==
Walthour learned to ride a bike in the early 1890s just about the time when the safety bicycle, the one we are most familiar with today, replaced the cumbersome high-wheeled bicycle. Walthour became employed in Atlanta, Georgia as a bike messenger and showed a great aptitude on the bicycle. Walthour began his amateur career in 1895 in road races in and around Atlanta.

== Professional career ==
Walthour quickly developed into a good professional sprinter, but was never good as the best in the game. However, with the development of the petroleum motorcycle, motor-pacing became as popular as, or more popular than sprinting. Motor-pacing was a fast, extremely hazardous occupation in which riders followed perilously close to their “pacers” on motorcycles, drafting within the protection of their slipstream. Walthour gave up sprinting for motor-pacing completely in 1901.

In the United States, Walthour raced indoors and outdoors on highly banked wooden surface or cement tracks. Many, like the track inside Madison Square Garden, were ten laps to the mile, but some were as big as five laps to the mile, such as the Charles River track in Boston. Cycle tracks dotted the east coast in cities such as Jacksonville, Atlanta, Baltimore, Philadelphia, Newark, New York City, Boston and Manchester and Walthour rode on them all.

After several years of offers to ride in Europe, Walthour finally went in 1904. He arrived in Paris March as an underdog and left in May as L’imbattable Walthour (The Unbeatable Walthour). Walthour won 11 of 12 races, defeating the best in Europe. Amos G. Batchelder, chairman of the racing board of the National Cycling Association in the United States, received a cable from a high-ranking French official (probably Victor Breyer, the director of the Buffalo velodrome in Paris) indicating that Walthour was the “best ever seen in Europe and by far the best that has ever come from America, and is distinctly superior to all other riders now following mechanical pacing machines."

By 1904, over a dozen motor-pacing professionals, including some of the best in the world, had been killed from high speed crashes. Although Walthour had been lucky enough to avoid serious injury, he had seen several of his cohorts carried out on stretchers. In 1907, the dangers of motor-pacing caught up to Walthour and he was nearly killed twice. Though Walthour had some success after 1907, his career was never the same. He finished his career with a litany of broken ribs, broken collar bones, broken fingers and dozens of concussions.

== Retirement and death ==
Walthour spent most of his retirement years living in New Jersey. Walthour had distanced himself from his son, Robert Howe Walthour Jr., over a religious squabble and the two rarely spoke. Bobby Walthour Jr. became a great cycling champion in his own right in the 1920s and 1930s.

Walthour Sr. died in Boston at the age of 71.
