= Alf Goullet =

Australian cyclist (1891–1995)

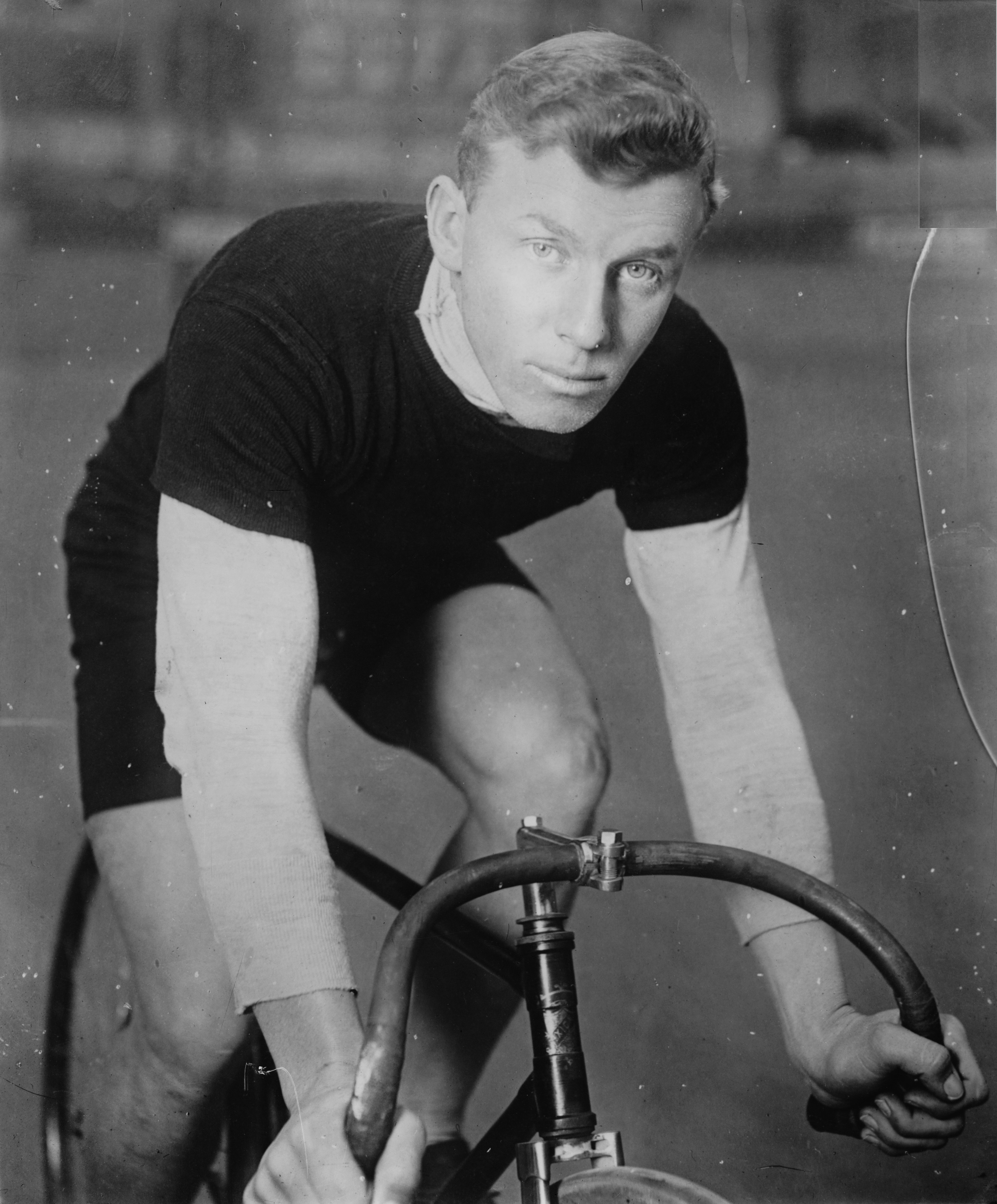

Personal information
- Full name: Alf Goullet
- Born: 5 April 1891 Gippsland, Victoria, Australia
- Died: 11 March 1995 (aged 103) Toms River, New Jersey, US

Cycling career
- Sport: Cycling
- Discipline: Track
- Role: Rider
- Rider type: Six-day

Alf Goullet (5 April 1891 – 11 March 1995) was an Australian cyclist who won more than 400 races on three continents, including 15 six-day races. He set world records from two-thirds of a mile to 50 miles, and the record for the distance ridden in a six-day race.

== Biography ==
=== Career ===
Goullet – pronounced to rhyme with roulette – was born in the Gippsland region of Victoria, Australia, and grew up in Emu, 240 km (150 mi) north of Melbourne. He created a cycling track at home by leading a horse as it dragged a log to clear the grass. He made a name in Australia and was contracted to ride in the United States. He landed at New York in winter 1910 "in a snowstorm, wearing a sleeveless shirt and a straw hat because it was summer at home." He was 19. He settled in Newark and raced on outdoor tracks set in parks and sports grounds.

In Salt Lake City in 1912, he set world records at two-thirds of a mile, three-quarters of a mile and a mile. A reporter there wrote:

Alfred Goullet, sensation of the cycle racing world, declares that the women of Salt Lake are the most beautiful he has ever seen. He is not quite 21 years old and is one of the cleanest, most straightforward and likeable athletes who ever appeared here. But Goullet is not a woman's man. He likes to admire from a distance. In fact, he does not allow any counter attractions to interfere with his determination to become the cycle racing champion of the world.

That winter, Goullet won the first Paris six-day race, paired with Joe Fogler of Brooklyn. He returned to America, and in November 1914 won the Six Days of New York, paired with another Australian, Alfred Grenda. The 2,759.2 miles (4,440.5 km) they covered is still a record. Goullet rode the last hour of the race – a six-day relay race – without Grenda's help. His partner had appendicitis.

He wrote in the Saturday Evening Post after his first six-day race in New York:

My knees were sore, I was suffering from stomach trouble, my hands were so numb I couldn't open them wide enough to button my collar for a month, and my eyes were so irritated I couldn't, for a long time, stand smoke in a room.

Goullet took American nationality in 1916. He joined the US Navy when the US joined World War I in 1917, but never left the country.

Goullet was so popular in the 1920s that he was paid $1,000 a day. Historian Peter Nye says a National Football League franchise could be bought at the time for a few hundred dollars. National Football League teams sold for $100 each in the 1920s, making all 11 teams together worth $1100. Goullet made 10 times as much. Such was the crowd – 15,000 – to see him at Madison Square Garden in 1921 that firemen surrounded the building to stop gatecrashers. The New York Times said: "Goullet won the race through the greatest exhibition of sustained speed ever known in history." A Tour de France rider, Maurice Brocco, and he picked up $50,000, equivalent to $900,000 in 2025, on the last night. Damon Runyon wrote in The New York Times that Goullet was the king of six-day racers, proclaiming, "Long live the king!"

By 1925, Goullet had won around 400 races, established six world records and won the New York six-day race eight times.

=== Later life and recognition ===
Goullet retired at 34, recently married, after that December's race at Madison Square Garden. The organisers paid him an appearance fee of $10,000. He estimated he earned $100,000 from cycling at a time when a manual worker brought home $5 a day. At his peak, he earned more than the $20,000 paid to baseball's Babe Ruth in the year he hit 54 home runs for the Yankees. He began selling life insurance and owned and ran a skating rink in Wayne Township.

He was inducted into the Madison Square Garden Hall of Fame in 1968, then flew to Melbourne – his first trip to Australia in 75 years – to join the Sport Australia Hall of Fame in 1986. He was enrolled in the US Bicycling Hall of Fame in May 1988.

He died in a nursing home aged 103 in Toms River, New Jersey. He was survived by his son, Richard, daughter Suzanne, six grandchildren and seven great-grandchildren.

In 2016, he was posthumously inducted into the Cycling Australia Hall of Fame.

== Palmarès ==
1909

- National sprint champion

1912

- Melbourne six-day, with Paddy Hehir
- Sydney six-day, with Paddy Hehir

1913

- National sprint champion
- Six Days of New York, with Joe Fogler
- Paris six-day, with Joe Fogler

1914

- Boston six-day with Alf Hill
- New York six-day, with Alfred Grenda
- Newark six-day, with Alf Hill

1916

- Boston six-day, with Alfred Grenda

1917

- New York six-day, with Jake Magin

1919

- New York six-day, with Eddie Madden

1920

- New York six-day, with Jake Magin

1921

- New York six-day, with Maurice Brocco

1922

- New York six-day, with Gaetano Belloni
- Chicago six-day, with Ernst Kockler

1923

- New York six-day, with Alfred Grenda
