= Frank Louis Kramer =

American cyclist (1880–1958)

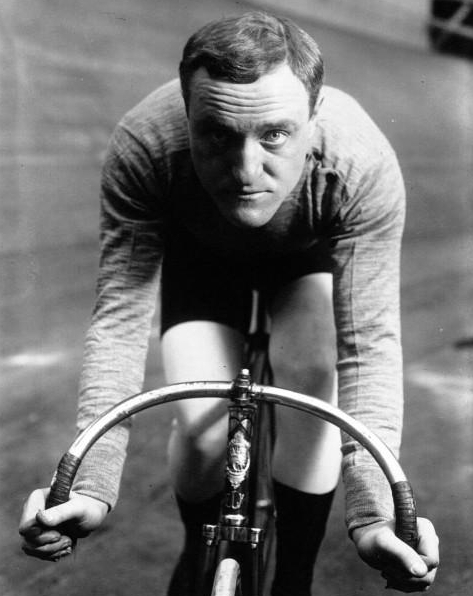

Personal information
- Born: September 15, 1880 Evansville, Indiana, U.S.
- Died: October 8, 1958 (aged 78) South Orange, New Jersey, U.S.

Cycling career
- Sport: Cycling
- Discipline: Track
- Role: Rider
- Rider type: Sprinter
Medal record
Men's track cycling
Representing United States
World Championships
Gold medal – first place	1912 Newark	Sprint

Frank Louis Kramer (1880–1958) was an American gold medal cyclist. He won 16 consecutive national championships from 1901 to 1916. He was inducted into the United States Bicycling Hall of Fame in 1988.

== Biography ==
He was born on September 15, 1880, in Evansville, Indiana.

He won the national championship in 1901 and raced in competitions in Europe in 1905 and 1906.

He won the UCI Track Cycling World Championships – Men's sprint at the Newark Velodrome in Newark, New Jersey, in 1912. Alfred Grenda of Australia, won the silver medal and André Perchicot won the bronze medal.

Kramer participated in bicycle racing for 27 years until his retirement on July 25, 1922, at the age of 42, after regarding "...racing as too strenuous for one of his age and expressed the belief that to continue would impair his health in later years". Twenty-three of those years he raced as a professional. Most of his racing was done in the United States of America but he also competed in races in France, Germany, Belgium, the Netherlands, Italy, and Denmark.

He died on October 8, 1958, in South Orange, New Jersey. He is buried in Orange's Rosedale Cemetery.
