= United States Bicycling Hall of Fame =

Cycling hall of fame

Coordinates: 38.544052°N 121.744679°W

United States Bicycling Hall of Fame logo

The United States Bicycling Hall of Fame, located in Davis, California, is a private 501c3 non-profit organization formed to preserve and promote the sport of cycling. The organization was founded in 1986 in Somerville, New Jersey and has inducted cyclists who have "achieved tremendous success in racing or have enhanced the sport" since 1987. It has operated a museum in Davis since 2009.

== Museum ==
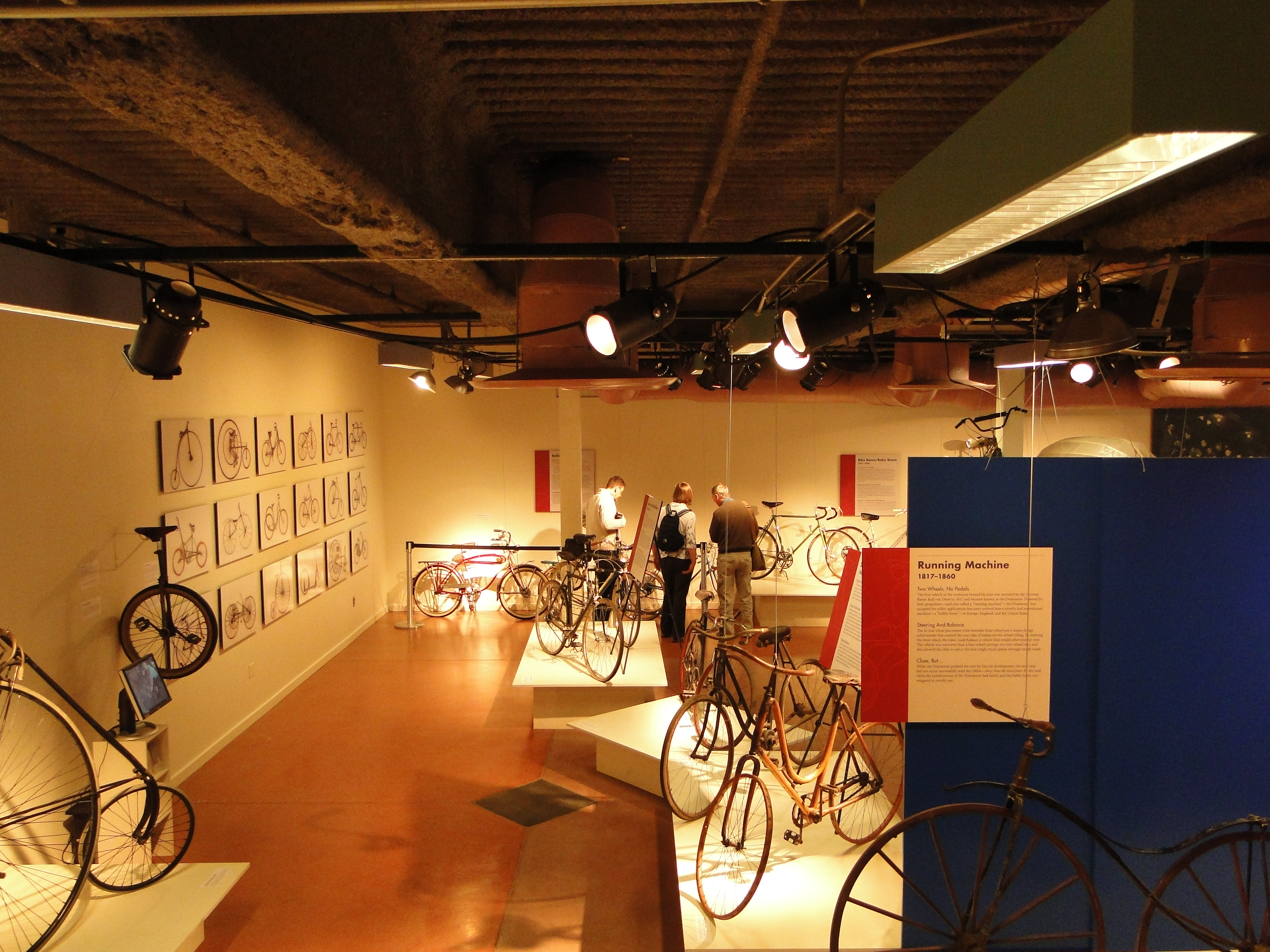
Historic bicycles at the U.S. Bicycling Hall of Fame in Davis, California

The Hall of Fame is located at 303 3rd Street, Davis, California. It is on the top floor of the building and includes the bicycles of Major Taylor and Frank Louis Kramer as well as a championship sash and medals from Frank Kramer.

The main floor of the museum includes topical exhibits. In 2010, there was an exhibit about the Tour of California and a display about Greg LeMond.

The basement includes an extensive display of historic bicycles that includes Draisine and Velocipede models. The display also includes landmark bicycles from the 1950s through the present that illustrate the rapid recent evolution of the bicycle.

== History ==
The hall was formerly located in Somerville, New Jersey. The Hall announced in April 2009 that it would move to Davis. The grand opening of the new downtown Davis facility was on April 24, 2010. The hall of fame joined a collection of historic bicycles that were already located in Davis. Davis has an extensive bicycling infrastructure, culture and legacy. It replaced the 3rd and B teens center, which was a slightly controversial move among the teenage population of Davis, but many of its functions, such as dances, were moved to the Veteran's Memorial Center.

== Inductees (Year of Induction) ==
=== Veteran Road & Track Competitor (Pre-1945) ===
- Tillie Anderson (2000)
- George Banker
- Frank Connell (1997)
- Albert Crossley (2015)
- Burton Downing (1998)
- Margaret Gast (1993)
- Alf Goullet (1988)
- George Mallory Hendee (2010)
- Norman Albert Hill (1996)
- Willie Honeman (1994)
- Victor Morice Hopkins (2006)
- Marcus Latimer Hurley (1996)
- John S. Johnson (2003)
- Joseph G. Kopsky (2001)
- Frank Louis Kramer (1988)
- Furman Kugler (1995)
- Mildred Kugler (2002)
- Joseph Magnani (1998)
- Reggie McNamara (2004)
- Charles "Mile-A-Minute" Murphy (1991)
- John "Jack" Weston Simes II (1999)
- John Sinibaldi (1997)
- Freddie Spencer (1990)
- William Spencer (2005)
- Marshall "Major" Taylor (1989)
- Bobby Walthour, Sr. (1989)
- William "Cecil" Yates (2007)
- Arthur Zimmerman (1989)

=== Veteran Road & Track Competitor (1970 & prior) ===
- Rob Parsons (2012)
- Doris Travani-Mulligan (2013)
- Bobby Walthour, Jr. (2011)
- Jimmy Walthour, Jr. (2008)
- Charley Winter (2014)

=== Veteran Road & Track Competitor ===
- George Banker (2019)
- Jerry Ash (2018)

=== Modern Road & Track Competitor (1945-1975) ===
- John Cotton Allis (1993)
- Allen Charles Bell (1994)
- Frank Peter Brilando (1993)
- Richard Cortright (2009)
- Harry "Skip" Cutting (2002)
- Jack Disney (1988)
- Nancy Burghart Haviland (2007)
- Jack Heid (1989)
- Michael Hiltner / Victor Vincente of America (2001)
- John Howard (1989)
- Art Longsjo (1988)
- Oliver "Butch" Martin (2005)
- Audrey McElmury (1989)
- Francois Mertens (2000)
- George Lewis Mount (1997)
- Tim Mountford (2017)
- Doris Kopsky Muller (1992)
- Mike Neel (2000)
- Rob Parsons (2012)
- Robert Pfarr (2006)
- Mary Jane Reoch (1994)
- Jim Rossi (1992)
- Jack Simes III (1995)
- Ted Smith (1991)
- Bob Tetzlaff (2003)
- Doris Travani-Mulligan (2013)
- Arnie Uhrlass (1997)
- John Vande Velde (2004)
- Steve Woznick (2003)
- Sheila Young-Ochowicz (1988)

=== Modern Road & Track Competitor (Post-1975) ===
- Bunki Bankaitis-Davis (2021)
- Leigh Barczewski (2016)
- Karen Bliss
- Jacques Boyer (1998)
- Connie Carpenter-Phinney (1990)
- Paul Deem (2021)
- Janie Eickhoff (2015)
- Jeanne Golay (2008)
- Mark Gorski (1995)
- Andrew Hampsten (2001)
- Erin Hartwell (2012)
- Steve Hegg (2006)
- Beth Heiden (2013)
- Eric Heiden (1999)
- Mari Holden (2016)
- Ron Kiefel (2004)
- Roy Knickman (2017)
- Greg LeMond (1996)
- Marianne Martin (2020)
- Mike McCarthy (2010)
- Leonard Harvey Nitz (1996)
- Martin 'Marty' Wayne Nothstein (2011)
- Sue Novara-Reber (1991)
- Connie Paraskevin-Young (2003)
- Davis Phinney (2001)
- Jeff Pierce (2020)
- Jennie Reed
- Ron Skarin (2005)
- Dale Stetina (2007)
- Wayne D. Stetina (1999)
- Inga Thompson (2014)
- Rebecca Twigg (2002)
- Nelson Vails (2009)

=== Modern Road & Track Competitor ===
- Jennie Reed (2018)

=== Contributor ===
- Michael Aisner (2005)
- Bernie Anderson (2007)
- Nancy Neiman Baranet (1992)
- Eddie Borysewicz (1996)
- Joe Breeze (2020)
- John "Pop" Brennan (1996)
- Richard Bryne (2021)
- Fred "Cappy" Capicchioni (1991)
- Mary "Cappy" Capicchioni (1993)
- Chris Carmichael (2003)
- Jerry Casale Jr. (2014)
- John Chapman (1993)
- David Chauner (1998)
- Richard DeGarmo (2018)
- Fred DeLong (2001)
- Otto Eisele (1994)
- Ted Ernst (2006)
- Emile Fraysee (1990)
- Mike Fraysse (1998)
- Barbara George (1994)
- Arthur Greenberg (2002)
- Phyllis Harmon (2009)
- Clayton John (2009)
- Keith Kingbay (1995)
- Fred "Pop" Kugler (1987)
- Pierre Lallement (2005)
- William Lambart (2007)
- Louis Maltese (1992)
- Vincent F. Menci (2013)
- Fred Mengoni (1994)
- Robin Morton (2016)
- Jim Ochowicz (1997)
- Sean Petty (2019)
- Mike Plant (2008)
- Albert Pope (1991)
- Charles E. Pratt (1997)
- Tom Ritchey (2012)
- Robert Rodale (1991)
- Dottie Saling (2010)
- Joe Saling (2017)
- Tom Schuler (2007)
- Ernie Seubert (1994)
- Mike Sinyard (2011)
- Frank Small (1995)
- Andy Taus (2015)
- Al Toefield (1992)
- Mike Walden (1990)
- Otto Wenz (1999)
- Paul Dudley White (2000)
- Bill Woodul (2004)

=== Mountain Biking ===
- Juliana Furtado (2005)
- Steve Larsen (2016)
- Ruthie Matthes (2011)
- Joe Murray (1999)
- Ned Overend (2001)
- Jacquie Phelan (2000)
- John Tomac (2004)

=== BMX ===
- David Clinton (2006)
- Cheri Elliott (2008)
- Gary Ellis (2010)
- Toby Henderson (2000)
- Greg A. Hill (2005)
- Mike King (2013)
- Perry Kramer (2004)
- Stu Thomsen (1998)

=== Off-Road ===
- Sara Ballantyne (2014)
- Susan Marie DeMattei (2012)
- Leigh Donovan (2020)
- Alison Dunlap (2015)
- Laurence Malone (2017)
- Myles Rockwell (2021)

=== Off-Road Competitor ===
- Eric Rupe (2018)

=== Special Recognition ===
- The Schwinn Family (1999)
- Team 7-Eleven (1997)
- Tour of Somerville (1993)

== See also ==
- Mountain Bike Hall of Fame
