= United States Cycling National Championships (historical) =

The predecessor of USACycling, the Amateur Bicycle League of America (ABLA) was founded in 1921 and held National Championships starting that year. From 1921 to 1964, these championships were two-, three-, or four-event omniums of track-style events, rather than a road race. USACycling souvenir programs list no results for events in 1931-1934, 1938, and 1942-1944. The 1939 program summarizes the 1937 National Champions. The 1938 results are from a national championship with similar events and format that the Amateur Athletic Union promoted.

== Amateur Men ==
Year	Location	Gold	Silver	Bronze
1921	Washington DC	Arthur Nieminsky N Y	Anthony Beckman NJ	Carl Stockholm Il
1922	Atlantic City NJ	Carl Hambacher NJ	Steve O'Connor Ca	Edward Conrad Mo
1923	Chicago Il	Charles Barclay Ca	Charlie Winter NY	Edward Walsh Il
1924	Buffalo NY	Charlie Winter NY	“Iggie” Gronkowski NY	Thos. Stephano NJ
1925	St. Louis Mo	Edward Merkner Il	Charlie Winter NY	Henry Bruhn Pa
1926	Philadelphia Pa	Edward Merkner Il	Edward Rhodes Md	Robert J. Connor DC
1927	Louisville Ky	Jimmy Walthour N Y	August Benson IL	Frank Connell NJ
1928	Kenosha Wi	R.J. Connor DC	Peter Smessaert Il	Sergio Matteini NY
1929	Newark NJ	Sergio Matteini NY	Bobby Thomas Wi	Al Vertenten, Il
1930	Kenosha Wi	Bobby Thomas Wi	Frank Keating NY	Predent De Lille NJ
1935	Atlantic City NJ	Cecil Hursey Ca	Chester Nelsen Sr Mo	Jackie Simes II NJ
1936	St. Louis Mo	Jackie Simes II NJ	Albin Jurca Wi	Charles Morton CA
1937	Buffalo NY	Charles Bergna NJ	Charles Morton CA	Stanley Gadrin, Il
1938	Chicago, IL	Albin Jurca Wi	Stanley Gadrin Il	J. Matthews Ca
1939	Columbus Ohio	Martin Deras Ca	Furman Kugler NJ	George Brown NY
1940	Detroit Mi	Furman Kugler NJ	George Woof Ca	Mike Walden Mi
1941	Pasadena Ca	Marvin Thomson Il	Bob Stauffacher Ca	Don Ferguson Ca
1945	Chicago Il	Ted Smith NY	Ed. Littig NJ	Warren Bare Pa
1946	Columbus Oh	Don Hester Ca	Jack Heid NJ	Ted Smith NY
1947	Fairmount Park, Philadelphia Pa	Ted Smith NY	Jack Heid NJ	James Lauf Md
1948	Kenosha Wi	Ted Smith NY	Joe Cirone, Jr Wi	Frank Brilando Il
1949	San Diego Ca	James Lauf Md	Thomas Montemage NY	Gus Gatto Ca
1950	New Brunswick NJ	Robert Pfarr Wi	Robert Travani Mi	Gus Gatto Ca
1951	Columbus Ohio	Gus Gatto Ca	Ernie Seubert NY	Joe Cirone, Ca
1952	New Brunswick NJ	Steven Hromjak Oh	Gus Gatto CA	Dick Stoddard Ca
1953	St. Louis Mo	Ronald Rhoads Ca	Gus Gatto	Harry Backer
1954	Minneapolis Mn	Jack Disney Ca	Harry Backer Ca	Richard Cortright NY
1955	New York NY	Jack Disney Ca	Art Longsjo	Allen Bell
1956	Orlando Fla	Jack Disney Ca	James Rossi Il	William Pflug NJ
1957	Kenosha Wi	Jack Disney Ca	Bob Tetzlaff	Jack Hartman Ca
1958	Newark NJ	Jack Disney Ca	Phil Criswell	Pat DeCollibus
1959	Kenosha Wi	James Rossi Il	Jack Hartman Ca	Dave Sharp Ca
1960	Milwaukee Wi	James Rossi Il	Robert Pfarr	Richard Cortright
1961	Milwaukee Wi	James Rossi Il	Jackie Simes	Jack Disney
1962	St. Louis Mo	James Rossi Il	Allen Bell	Jack Disney
1963	Chicago Il	James Rossi Il	Jackie Simes NJ	Allen Bell NJ
1964	New York NY	Jackie Simes NJ	Alan Grieco NJ	Hans Wolf NY

== Amateur Women ==
First held in 1937.

Year	Gold	Silver	Bronze
1937	Doris Kopsky NJ	Teresa Ettl, Pa	Ruth Lipsett
1938	Dolores Amundsen Il		
1939	Gladys Owen NY	Doris Kopsky	Betty Jane Boehmer
1940	Mildred Kugler NJ	Simone Opsommer	Esther Leipold
1941	Jean Michels Il	Elsie Stracke, Mo	Mildred Kugler, NJ
1945	Mildred Dietz Mo	Georgia McCluskey Mi	Kay Montgomery
1946	Mildred Dietz Mo	Janice Delhougne Mo	Peggy Barber Il
1947	Doris Travani Mi	Doris Kessel, NJ	Delores Lussier, RI
1948	Doris Travani Mi	Doris Kessel	Grace Jorgenson
1949	Doris Travani Mi	Grace Jorgenson Wi	Kay Montgomery NY
1950	Doris Travani Mi	Gay Juner	Jeanne Omelenchuk née Robinson Mi
1951	Anna Piplak Il	Barbara Nelson Wi	Margie Thomas Ca
1952	Jeanne Omelenchuk née Robinson Mi	Nancy Nieman Mi	Gay Juner Ca
1953	Nancy Neiman Mi	Jeanne Omelenchuk née Robinson	Ruth Griffiths
1954	Nancy Neiman Mi	Alice Springer (Mi)	Jeanne Omelenchuk née Robinson
1955	Jeanne Omelenchuk née Robinson Mi	Nancy Nieman (Mi)	Alice Springer (Ca)
1956	Nancy Neiman Mi	Jeanne Omelenchuk née Robinson Mi	Mickey Finch NY
1957	Nancy Neiman Mi	Eva Langfritz NJ	Joanne Speckin Mi
1958	Maxine Conover Wash	Joanne Speckin	Nancy Neiman
1959	Joanne Speckin Mi	Jeanne Omelenchuk née Robinson Mi	Maxine Conover Wa
1960	Edith A. Johnson NY	Joanne Speckin	Jeanne Omelenchuk
1961	Edith A Johnson NY	Elizabeth Burghart	Nancy Burghart
1962	Nancy Burghart NY	Elizabeth Burghart	Jeanne Omelenchuk
1963	Edith Johnson NY	Nancy Burghart NY	Jeanne Omelenchuk Mi
1964	Nancy Burghart NY	Edith Johnson NY	Cheryl Fleischman Wi

== Juniors ==
Year	Gold	Silver	Bronze
1922	Charles Smithson DC	Jos Simons Co	George Howe Tx
1923	Samuel Dowell Ohio	Alphones Vertenten Il	Leonard De Lue Ca
1924	William Honeman, NJ	Roy Ulrich Mo	Charles Penny Fl
1925	Walter Bresnan NY	Geary May Ca	William Unkert NJ
1926	Chester Atwood DC	Henry O'Brien Ca	Irving McNulty Co
1927	Ted Becker, Jr Il	Bobby Thomas Wi	Charles Brace NJ
1928	Bobby Thomas Wi	William Creamer Ca	Osmond Stevens, Mo
1929	Tino Reboli NJ	Marco Rosales NY	A. Englehardt Il
1930	George Thomas Wi	Otto Leudeke NJ	Sig. Jablonksi Il
1935	David Martin NJ	George Ferry Oh	Aldo Castagnoni NY
1936	David Martin NJ	Gene Potente Wi	Lucien Musso, NY
1937	Furman Kugler NJ	Adolph Juner	Roger Smith
1938	John Van Diest Oh		
1939	Frank Paul Ut	William Ossler Mi	Takahi Ishihara Hi
1940	Harry Naismyth NJ	William Ossler	I. T. Gronkowsky
1941	Andres Bernardsky Ca	Chuck Edwards, Il	Walter Sorenson Wi
1945	Spencer Busch NY	Ernest Seubert	Steve Ledogar
1946	Don Sheldon NJ	Percy Murnane NY	Clayton Meade NY
1947	Joe Cirone, Jr Ca	Art Stahlberg, Il	Karl Wettberg, Mi
1948	Donald Clausen Wi	Wesley Truesdale	George Caruana
1949	Donald Clausen Wi	Harry Backer Ca	Richard O'Brien Ca
1950	Harry Backer Ca	Allen Bell	Richard Gatto
1951	Vaughn Angell Ut	Jack Peterson, CA	Paul Tenney Ca
1952	John Chiselko NJ	Vaughn Angell Ut	Harry Tobin NJ
1953	Jack Hartman Ca	Jerry Carson	Skippy Hess
1954	Robert Zumwalt Jr.	Pat DeCollibus	William Pflug
1955	Pat DeCollibus NY	Phil Criswell (Ca)	Dwayne Davenport (Ca) Don Carlin (NJ) (tie)
1956	Dave Staub Ca	Don Tenney Ca	Ed Ruesing Mo
1957	Perry Metzler NY	Ed Ruesing Mo	Tom Myrall
1958	James Donovan NY	Dave Sharp	Eddie Rudolph
1959	Jackie Simes 3rd NJ	Bud Campbell Ca	Mike Fraysse NJ
1960	Bobbie Fenn NY	Ray Matthews III	Mike Fraysse
1961	Alan Grieco NJ	Ray Mathews III	Dave Haarstick
1962	Alan Grieco NJ	William Mazurek	Olaf Moetus
1963	Jose Nin N Y	Tom McMillan Ca	Jean Waschgau Ca
1964	Tony McMillan Ca	Pete Senia, Jr NY	Gary Carmichael Ca

== Venues, Dates, and Courses ==
The omniums were held on a variety of courses including one to three mile loops in city roads and public parks, dirt car and horse-racing tracks, and on a banked, dirt velodrome. Starting in the late 1950s the championships were held on more traditional paved velodromes.

Year	Date	Location	Course Description	Sources
1921	10/09	West Potomac Park, Washington DC	Park loop roads	
1922	09/16	City Athletic Field, Atlantic City, NJ		
1923	9/8-9/9	Humboldt Park, Chicago, Il	Park loop roads	
1924	9/6-9/7	Humboldt Park, Buffalo, NY	Park loop roads	
1925	9/5-9/6	Forest Park, St. Louis	Park loop roads	
1926	9/11-9/12	Sesquicentenial Stadium, Philadelphia	cinder, unbanked track	
1927	9/10-9/11	Shawnee Park, Louisville, Ky	Park loop roads	
1928	9/8-9/9	Washington Park Bowl, Kenosha, Wi	1/5 mile banked dirt velodrome	
1929	9/7-9/8	Weequahic Park, Newark, NJ	1/2 mile, oval, dirt, horse-racing track	
1930	9/6-9/7	Washington Park Bowl, Kenosha, Wi	1/5 mile banked dirt velodrome	
1931	Not held			
1932	Not held			
1933	Not held			
1934	Not held			
1935	9/6-9/7	Albany Ave, near Bader Field, Atlantic City, NJ	short road course	
1936	9/12-9/13	Forest Park, St. Louis	1.8 mile lap; park loop roads	
1937	9/4-9/5	Humboldt Park, Buffalo, NY	Park loop roads	
1938	9/17-9/18	Garfield Park, Chicago, Il	Park loop roads	
1939	9/2-9/3	Franklin Park, Columbus, Oh	Park loop roads	
1940	8/31-9/1	Chandler Park, Detroit Michigan	Park loop roads	,
1941	8/23-8/24	Arroyo Seco (Rose Bowl), Pasadena, Ca	3 mile lap; city roads	
1942	Not held			
1943	Not held			
1944	Not held			
1945	8/17-8/19	Humboldt Park, Chicago, Il	1.75 mile lap; park loop roads	
1946	8/17-8/19	Franklin Park, Columbus, Oh	Park loop roads	
1947	8/16-8/17	Fairmount Park, Philadelphia Pa	1 mile lap; park loop roads,	
1948	9/3-9/5	Washington Park Bowl, Kenosha, Wi	1/5 mile banked dirt velodrome	
1949	8/19-8/21	Balboa Park Stadium, San Diego, CA.	1/4 mile slightly banked midget clay-surface auto racing track.	
1950	8/19-8/20	Johnson Park, Piscataway, NJ	1.1 mile lap; park loop roads. See Note 1.	
1951	8/4-8/5	Franklin Park, Columbus, Oh	1 mile lap; park loop roads	
1952	8/30-8/31	Johnson Park, Piscataway, NJ	1/2 mile flat dirt horse-racing track. See Note 2.	
1953	9/5-9/6	Forest Park, St. Louis	1.8 mile lap; park loop roads	
1954	9/25-9/26	Parade Stadium, Minneapolis, Mn	1/4 mile asphalt running track. See Note 3	
1955	8/27-8/28	Flushing Meadows Cycling Track, Queens, NY	1/2 mile unbanked cycling course	
1956	7/14-7/15	Ben White Raceway Orlando FL	1/2 mile dirt horse-racing track	
1957	8/17-8/18	Washington Park Bowl, Kenosha, Wi	1/5 mile banked dirt velodrome. See Note 5.	
1958	8/16-8/17	Weequahic Park, Newark, NJ	1/2 mile, oval, dirt, horse-racing track	
1959	8/22-8/23	Washington Park Bowl, Kenosha, Wi	1/5 mile banked dirt velodrome	
1960	7/16-7/17	Brown Deer Velodrome, Milwaukee, Wi	1/4 mile banked asphalt velodrome	
1961	8/26-8/27	Brown Deer Velodrome, Milwaukee, Wi	1/4 mile banked asphalt velodrome See Note 6.	
1962	8/25-8/26	Penrose Park Velodrome, St. Louis, Mo	1/5 mile asphalt velodrome; 28° banking	
1963	8/23-8/24	Northbrook Velodrome, Northbrook, Il	382 m velodrome 18° banking	
1964	8/29-8/30	Kissena velodrome, NY	400 m velodrome 19° banking	

=== Venue Notes ===
1. Was originally scheduled for horse-racing track, but was rained out and run on park loop roads.
2. Day 2 was conducted on a 1 mile park loop road due to rain.
3. Day 2 was moved to a road course on Victory Ave after many crashes on day 1.
4. Day 2 moved to CCW course on city streets due to rain.
5. Day 2 moved to course on city streets due to rain.
6. Final events to day 2 were conducted on a 1.8 mile loop in the park due to rain.

== Formats ==
- 1923 Senior and Junior Men rode 1/3 mile, 1 mile, 5 mile unpaced, and 10 mile.
- 1924 Senior Men rode 1/3 mile (in heats), 1 mile (in heats), 5 mile unpaced, and 10 mile. Junior men rode 1/4 mile (in heats), 1/3 mile (in heats) 1 mile (unpaced), and 2 mile.
- 1938 Senior Men rode three events: 1 mile, 5 mile, 10 mile. A 25 mile points race was run but was not part of the championship omnium.
- 1939 Senior Men rode four events: 1 mile (in heats), 5 mile, 10 mile points race, 25 mile points race.
- 1946 Senior men rode four events: 1 mile (in heats), 5 mile, 10 mile points race, 25 mile points race.
- 1947 Senior Men rode 1 mile, 5 mile, 10 mile races, 25 mile points race.
- 1948 Senior Men rode 0.5 mile, 1 mile, 5 mile, 10 mile races. The 1, 2, and 5 mile races ran in heats. The format of the 10 mile race was not listed.
- 1949 Senior Men rode 0.5 mile, 1 mile, 5 mile, 10 mile races. The 1, 2, and 5 mile races ran in heats. The format of the 10 mile race was not listed.
- 1950 Senior Men rode 1 mile, 2 mile, 5 mile, 10 mile points races. The 1, 2, and 5 mile races ran in heats.
- 1952 Senior Men rode 1 mile, 2 mile, 5 mile, 10 mile points races. The 1, 2, and 5 mile races ran in heats.
- 1953 Senior Men rode 1 mile, 3 mile, 5 mile, 25 mile points race. The 1, 3, and 5 mile races ran in heats.
- 1954 Senior Men rode 0.5 mile, 1 mile, 5 mile, and 10 mile. The 0.5 mile, 1 mile, and 5 mile races ran in heats. The format of the 10 mile race was not listed.
- 1956 Senior Men rode 1 mile, 2 mile, 5 mile, and 10 mile points race. The 1 mile and 2 mile races ran in heats.
- 1957 Senior Men rode 1 mile, 2 mile, 5 mile, and 10 mile points race.
- 1962 Senior Men rode 1000 m time trial, 4000 m pursuit, 0.5 mile, 10 mile points race. The 4000 m pursuit, 0.5 mile ran in heats
- 1964 Senior Men rode 1000 m time trial, 4000 m pursuit, 1000 m sprints, 10 mile scratch race. Juniors: 1/2 mile, 1 mile, 2 miles, 5 miles. Women: 1/2 mile, 1 mile, 2 miles.

Formats taken from National Championship programs unless otherwise noted.
