= Tour of Somerville =

Bicycle race series in New Jersey, US

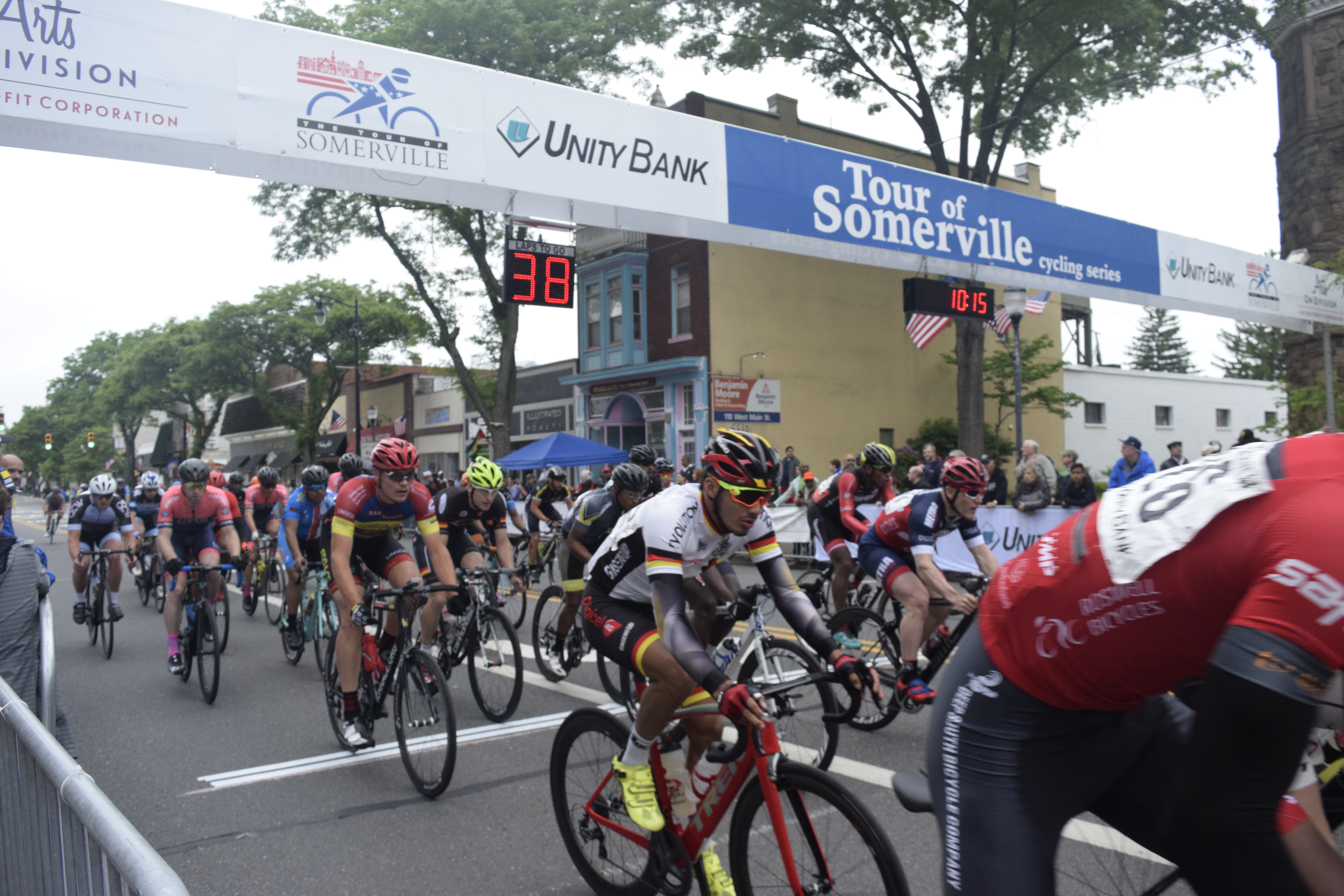
- Tour of Somerville 2017

Race details
- Date: Memorial Day
- Region: Somerville, New Jersey
- Nickname: The Kentucky Derby of Cycling
- Discipline: Road
- Type: One-day

History (men)
- First edition: 1940
- Editions: 80 (as of 2025)
- First winner: Furman Kugler (USA)
- Most wins: Jonas Carney (USA) (5)
- Most recent: Lucas Bourgoyne (USA)

History (women)
- First edition: 1976
- Editions: 48 (as of 2025)
- First winner: Mary Jane Reoch (USA)
- Most wins: Laura Van Gilder (USA) (5)
- Most recent: Marlies Mejías (CUB)

The Tour of Somerville is an annual, three-day series of bicycle races held in and around Somerville, New Jersey, during Memorial Day weekend. The featured Memorial Day event, the Kugler-Anderson 50-mile race for professional and elite cyclists is the oldest competitive bicycle race in the country, having first been run in 1940. The event has become known as The Kentucky Derby of Cycling and draws international Olympians and top cyclists from around the world. It was known as the predominant cycling race in America from the 1940s through the 1980s.

== History ==
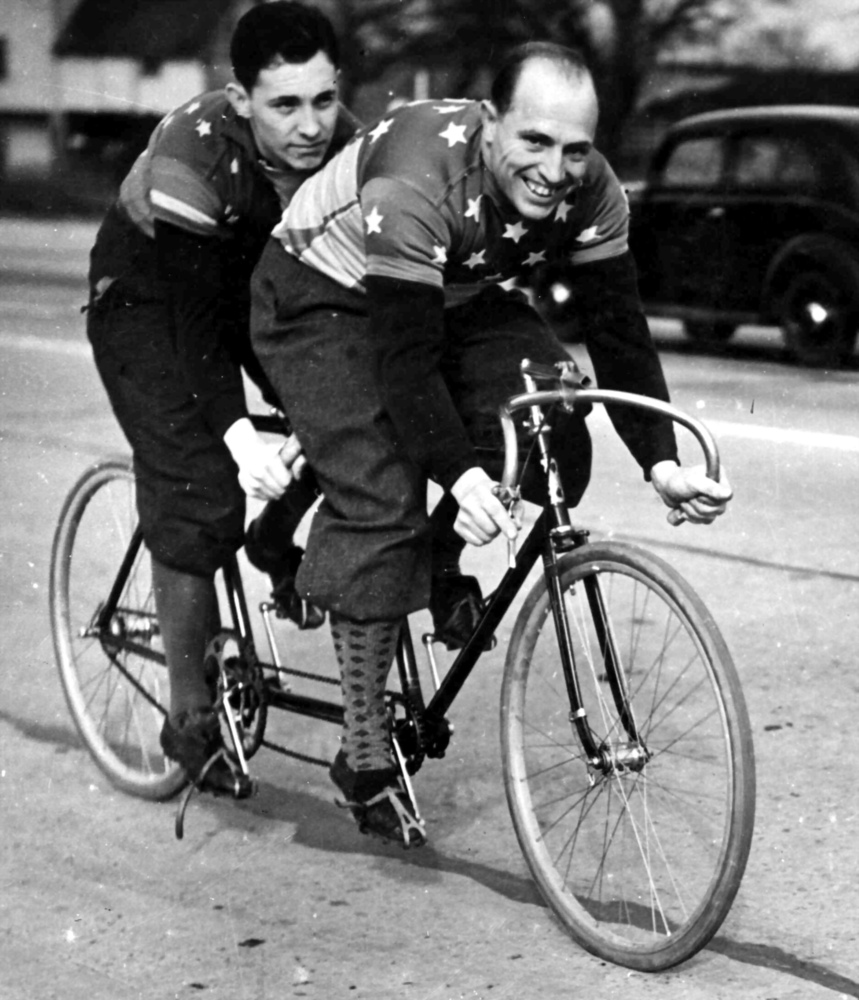
First Tour of Somerville winner Furman Kugler and his father, tour founder, Fred "Pop" Kugler

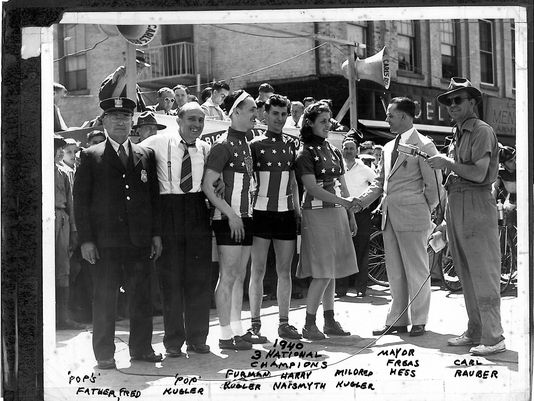
Fred Kugler Sr., Fred "Pop" Kugler (Tour of Somerville founder), Furman Kugler, Harry Naismyth, Mildred Kugler, Somerville mayor Freas Hess, and Carl Rauber

The Tour of Somerville is the oldest major bicycle race in the United States. It was first run in 1940. The race was created by Somerville bike shop owner Fred “Pop” Kugler when his son, Furman, a past National Cycling champion and one of the country's most promising cyclists, had wanted a race closer to home. In an interview before his death in 1990, Pop recalled that “Furman wanted to sleep in his own bed for a change the night before a race, so I figured ‘why not, let’s give people something to look at.’”

The elder Kugler got the necessary licenses and sanctions from cycling officials in 1939 but the one thing he didn’t count on was a snag from the state capital. “I wanted to call it a race,” he said some years later, but New Jersey law specified that no contest of any type for wage, purse, or prize could be held on a state highway. The dilemma was that Somerville's Main Street was, and still is, part of New Jersey Route 28. The state motor vehicle commissioner at the time suggested if the race instead be called a "Tour" he would issue a permit.

=== The First Races ===
Furman Kugler won the first Tour of Somerville in 1940, which attracted a field of 117 riders from as far away as New England and the Midwest. He repeated his dominance by winning his hometown race again in 1941. Furman sat out the 1942 event and that opened the door for one of his closest friends, Carl Anderson of Clifton, New Jersey, to take top honors. The race was suspended during World War II, during which Furman was killed in Okinawa and Anderson in Belgium. Renewed in 1947, the Tour was appropriately renamed The Kugler-Anderson Memorial and has been held every Memorial Day since.

Kugler's first 1940 win for the 50-miles clocked in at 2 hours and 8 minutes while riding a fixed gear, steel bicycle with wooden rims. Given advances in bike technology and the physical evolution of competitive cyclists, recent winning times for the race have been approaching the 1 hour and 40 minute mark. The bike Kugler used to win the 1940 and 1941 races is currently encased for display in a plexi-glass monument along the race circuit near Somerville Borough Hall. For his efforts during the inaugural race, Kugler won a new bicycle valued at $75, a trophy, an oil painting and a badminton set, a far cry from the current $20,000 in total prizes, distributed in equal $10,000 purses for the top men and women finishers.

=== Evolving History ===
Once known by race organizers as an event “second only to the national championships,” past competitors have included the likes of Tour de France winner Greg LeMond and Olympic gold medal speed skater turned cyclist Eric Heiden, as well as scores of national, Olympic, and world cycling champions from throughout the world. More than a sports event, the Tour has evolved as a combined street fair, music festival, arts expo, and neighborhood lawn party all wrapped around the fast-paced, multi-lap competition through the streets of Somerville's historic downtown.

Since 1947, the race has been an annual tradition in Somerville dedicated in part to honoring American heroes and Memorial Day. According to race announcer and former Tour competitor Joe Saling, the race is such a fixture in the community that, "no one calls it the Tour of Somerville in town, it's just 'the bike race.'" Although the course through the town has changed over the years, Saling explains that the essence of the race never has. The focus of the event has always been working with the town to create a venue for a classic criterium, the kind of race that America is famous for all over the world.

==== Kugler-Anderson Memorial (1940) ====
From its earliest beginnings, the Kugler-Anderson Memorial event has read like a who's who of North American cycling. In the 1940s and 1950s, national champions Furman Kugler, Donald Sheldon, and John Chilseko, as well as Olympians Jack Heid and Art Longsjo, all took victories (Kugler and Sheldon, twice) and laid the foundation that would make this event a national classic. This trend continued into the 1960s, with wins by Olympians Michael Hiltner, Hans Wolf, and Jackie Simes, and into the 1970s, with nationally renowned cyclists Roger Young, Ron Skarin, Rory O'Reilly, Dave Boll, Dave Ware, and William Martin, all taking wins.

==== Harry Naismyth Junior (1949) ====
In 1949, the Harry Naismith Junior event was officially added for males age 15–17. Harry Naismith was from Somerville and became Junior National Champion in 1940. Two cyclists who won both the Harry Naismith Junior event and Kugler-Anderson Memorial event were Jackie Simes and Roger Young. Several of the winners of the Harry Naismith Junior event also won national championships during their cycling career: Jackie Simes, Bobby Fenn, Alan Grieco, Roger Young, Bruce Donaghy, Andy Weaver, Dale Stetina, Jeff Lippincott, Dave Brinton, and Ken Christoff. Many of these riders also competed at the Olympics, Pan-American Games, and/or World Championships (Simes, Young, Donaghy, Weaver, Stetina, and Brinton). Paul Willerton, the winner in 1987, later rode professionally with Greg Lemond in Europe.

==== Jaycee/John Chilseko Intermediate (1971) ====
In 1971, the Jaycee/John Chilseko Intermediate event was added for males age 12–14. Chiselko, who was from Somerville, was the winner of the Kugler-Anderson Memorial in 1954 and "as a 17 year old high school senior in 1954, the youngest record winner of the Tour. He was also a junior national champion and winner of the best all-around rider in the United States two years running."

==== Jaycee/Alan Bell Midget (1972) ====
In 1972, the Jaycee/Alan Bell Midget event was added for males and females age 9–11. Alan Bell was from Somerville, NJ, and "was a member of the 1956 and 1960 US Olympic Teams which competed in Melbourne, Australia and Rome, Italy." While Bell never won the Kugler-Anderson event at Somerville, on five occasions he "finished second in the prestigious" event.

==== Mildred Kugler Open (1976) ====
Although women first competed in a featured race during the early 1950s, a formal effort to expand women's racing as a separate part of the Tour of Somerville did not occur until 1976, when the Mildred Kugler Open 25-mile event was added. Mildred, daughter of race founder Fred “Pop” Kugler, was herself a New Jersey state champion who won the 1940 national cycling championship in her category. Although she retired in 1942 at the early age of seventeen, she later came out of retirement and won the 1952 NJ state championship, as well as third place at the National Championships that same year.

=== Popularity ===
In 1980, Sports Illustrated published a six-page photo feature story on the race headlined “The Somerville Whirl,” in which author Sarah Pileggi concluded: “As for the spectators, at the cost of not one penny and from the best location in the house, the sidewalks, they will be able to watch the world’s finest athletes whirring past on their delicate machines 77 separate times. Which, all things considered, surely makes Memorial Day in Somerville the greatest bargain in sport.”

Joe Saling, who was the announcer of the Tour of Somerville for many years, remembers when the race was "the most prestigious race in the country to have on your record," and recalls how riders felt about winning Somerville: "I remember Ron Skarin, who was on a couple of Olympic teams and multiple-time national champion, won Somerville twice in the seventies. And when he won the first time, he said that it topped anything else he’d done in his career."

Five-time winner, Laura Van Gilder, summed up the prestige of this event in 2021, saying, “[n]ationally, this race was the ‘Grandaddy’ of all criterium races and one not to miss. It remains one of the oldest races in America and still has the prestige of an iconic event on the racing calendar.”

In the past, the Tour of Somerville has been estimated to attract "up to 30,000 people each year" with some estimates of spectator attendance being even higher. In a May 28, 1983 article, The Courier News reported that "over 40,000 thousand people are expected to line the course for the 3:15p.m., 50-mile event [Kugler-Anderson Memorial]."

=== 21st century ===
Begun as a Memorial Day event only and having remained so through the 1990s, changes were made then to extend the Memorial Day event into a three-day series in order to give cyclists more opportunities to compete during the weekend. As such, this year's Tour of Somerville Cycling Series, with primary sponsorship provided by Unity Bank, will also include a number of Saturday races for USA Cycling licensed riders of various skills levels in neighboring Bound Brook, New Jersey, and a Sunday series of straight line sprint racing down Somerville's historic Main Street prior to Monday's historic Tour of Somerville.

In 2019, for the fourth consecutive year, “both men’s and women’s race participants will be competing for equal $10,000 prize lists.” The 2020 race was cancelled for the first time ever due to the COVID-19 pandemic, and the 2021 race was postponed to Labor Day, only to be later cancelled due to serious flooding in Somerville from the remnants of Hurricane Ida four days prior to the race.

Recent changes to the Tour's course have shortened the length of a lap by several blocks to move the start finish line to the heart of the town's commercial Main Street. Since 2017, promoters decided to shift crowds away from the lawn and streets surrounding the Somerset County Courthouse to a more central Main Street location. Regarding the change, Jackie Simes, former Olympian and two-time winner of the Tour, has said, "It makes racing a little more technical from the riders’ perspective, which is good. It's a harder turn to make on to Bridge Street, I remember being smack up against the curb because it funnels down in there; it's a great place to watch the race."

With the onset of other large races nationally competing for riders with Somerville on Memorial Day, Somerville has adapted to still bring a powerful field of professional and premier amateur cyclist to the Tour. As race announcer, Saling concludes that in recent years, "We don't necessarily have full representation from all the pro teams, but we do attract so many individually strong racers that spectators are going to see a race where the action is non-stop. No single team is able to control the overall strategy, and it leads to a situation where David really can knock off Goliath."

== Kugler-Anderson Memorial Tour ==
=== Winners ===
Year	Winner	Nationality
2026	Lucas Bourgoyne	United States
2025	Lucas Bourgoyne	United States
2024	Cesar Marte	United States
2023	Danny Estevez	United States
2022	George Jackson	New Zealand
2021	Canceled due to Hurricane Ida	
2020	Canceled due to the COVID-19 pandemic in New Jersey	
2019	Connor Sallee	United States
2018	Shane Kline	United States
2017	Noah Granigan	United States
2016	Scott Savory	Guyana
2015	Andrew Dahlheim	United States
2014	Adam Alexander	Trinidad and Tobago
2013	Hilton Clarke	Australia
2012	Luke Keough	United States
2011	Timothy Gudsell	New Zealand
2010	Ben Kersten	Australia
2009	Lucas Sebastián Haedo	Argentina
2008	Lucas Sebastián Haedo	Argentina
2007	Hilton Clarke	Australia
2006	Juan José Haedo	Argentina
2005	Kyle Wamsley	United States
2004	Viktor Rapinski	Belarus
2003	Jonas Carney	United States
2002	Jonas Carney	United States
2001	Eric Wohlberg	Canada
2000	Jonas Carney	United States
1999	Eric Wohlberg	Canada
1998	Jonas Carney	United States
1997	Brett Aitken	Australia
1996	Julian Dean	New Zealand
1995	Jason Snow	United States
1994	Jonas Carney	United States
1993	Gary Anderson	New Zealand
1992	Jonas Carney	United States
1991	Brian Moroney	United States
1990	Matt Eaton	United States
1989	Graeme Miller	New Zealand
1988	Roberto Gaggioli	Italy
1987	Paul Pearson	United States
1986	Marc Maertens	Belgium
1985	Matt Eaton	United States
1984	Davis Phinney	United States
1983	Steve Bauer	Canada
1982	Gary Trevisiol	Canada
1981	Wayne Stetina	United States
1980	Steve Bauer	Canada
1979	William Martin	United States
1978	Jocelyn Lovell	Canada
1977	Dave Ware	United States
1976	Dave Boll	United States
1975	Rory O'Reilly	United States
1974	Ron Skarin	United States
1973	Ron Skarin	United States
1972	Roger Young	United States
1971	Eddie Parrott	United States
1970	Robert Farrell	Trinidad and Tobago
1969	Jackie Simes	United States
1968	Siegi Koch	Canada
1967	Jackie Simes	United States
1966	John Aschen	United States
1965	Eckhard Viehover	Germany
1964	Hans Wolf	United States
1963	Olaf Moetus	United States
1962	Richard Centore	United States
1961	Robert McKnown	United States
1960	Michael Hiltner	United States
1959	Rupert Waltl	United States
1958	Art Longsjo	United States
1957	Arnold Uhrlass	United States
1956	Jack Heid	United States
1955	Pat Murphy	Canada
1954	John Chiselko	United States
1953	Hugh Starrs	United States
1952	Ernest Seubert	United States
1951	Francis Mertens	United States
1950	Richard Cortright	United States
1949	Frank Brilando	United States
1948	Donald Sheldon	United States
1947	Donald Sheldon	United States
1943–1946	Suspended due to World War II	
1942	Carl Anderson	United States
1941	Furman Kugler	United States
1940	Furman Kugler	United States

=== Multiple winners ===
Riders in italics are still active.

Wins	Rider	Editions
5	Jonas Carney (USA)	1992, 1998, 2000, 2002, 2003
2	Hilton Clarke (AUS)	2007, 2013
2	Lucas Sebastian Haedo (ARG)	2008, 2009
2	Eric Wohlberg (CAN)	1999, 2001
2	Matt Eaton (USA)	1985, 1990
2	Steve Bauer (CAN)	1980, 1983
2	Ron Skarin (USA)	1973, 1974
2	Jackie Simes (USA)	1967, 1969
2	Donald Sheldon (USA)	1947, 1949
2	Furman Kugler (USA)	1940, 1941

=== Wins per country ===
Wins	Country
53	United States
8	Canada
5	New Zealand
4	Australia
3	Argentina
2	Trinidad and Tobago
1	Belarus; Belgium; Germany; Guyana; Italy

== Mildred Kugler Women's Open ==
=== Winners ===
Year	Winner	Nationality
2026	Marlies Mejías	Cuba
2025	Marlies Mejías	Cuba
2024	Coryn Labecki	United States
2023	Jessica Chong	United States
2022	Katia Martinez	Mexico
2021	Canceled due to Hurricane Ida	
2020	Canceled due to the COVID-19 pandemic in New Jersey	
2019	Maggie Coles-Lyster	Canada
2018	Laura Van Gilder	United States
2017	Laura Van Gilder	United States
2016	Ellen Watters	Canada
2015	Lauretta Hanson	Australia
2014	Erica Allar	United States
2013	Kimberley Wells	Australia
2012	Ruth Winder	United States
2011	Theresa Cliff-Ryan	United States
2010	Theresa Cliff-Ryan	United States
2009	Tina Pic	United States
2008	Tina Pic	United States
2007	Theresa Cliff-Ryan	United States
2006	Tina Pic	United States
2005	Laura Van Gilder	United States
2004	Melissa Sanbom	United States
2003	Sarah Uhl	United States
2002	Laura Van Gilder	United States
2001	Christina Underwood	United States
2000	Tina Pic	United States
1999	Laura Van Gilder	United States
1998	Karen Bliss-Livingston	United States
1997	Karen Bliss-Livingston	United States
1996	Jessica Grieco	United States
1995	Jessica Grieco	United States
1994	Jeanne Golay	United States
1993	Marianne Berglund	Sweden
1992	Laura Charmeda	United States
1991	Karen Bliss-Livingston	United States
1990	Jan Bolland	United States
1989	Susan Elias	United States
1988	Susan Elias	United States
1987	Henny Top	Netherlands
1986	Peggy Mass	United States
1985	Sophie Eaton	United States
1984	Sue Novara-Reber	United States
1983	Sue Novara-Reber	United States
1982	Sue Novara-Reber	United States
1981	Karen Strong	Canada
1980	Karen Strong	Canada
1979	Karen Strong	Canada
1978	Sue Novara-Reber	United States
1977	Karen Strong	Canada
1976	Mary Jane Reoch	United States

=== Multiple Winners - Women ===
Riders in italics are still active.

Wins	Rider	Editions
5	Laura Van Gilder (USA)	1999, 2002, 2005, 2017, 2018
4	Tina Pic (USA)	2000, 2006, 2008, 2009
4	Sue Novara-Reber (USA)	1978, 1982, 1983, 1984
4	Karen Strong (CAN)	1977, 1979, 1980, 1981
3	Theresa Cliff-Ryan (USA)	2007, 2010, 2011
3	Karen Bliss-Livingston (USA)	1991, 1997, 1998
2	Jessica Grieco (USA)	1995, 1996
2	Susan Elias (USA)	1988, 1989

=== Wins Per Country - Women ===
Wins	Country
36	United States
6	Canada
2	Australia
1	Cuba; Mexico; Netherlands; Sweden

== Harry Naismyth Junior (age 16-18) ==
=== Winners ===
Year	Winner	Nationality/Home
2026	Jackson Sanders	Allentown, PA
2025	Alexander Barr	Lebanon, PA
2024	Alexander Barr	Lebanon, PA
2023	Enzo Edmonds	Brooklyn, NY
2022	O'Neill Gatta	Wilimington, DE
2021	Canceled due to Hurricane Ida	
2020	Canceled due to the COVID-19 pandemic in New Jersey	
2019	Lucas Huesman	Stonington, CT
2018	Gabriel Tonin	NY
2017	Alexander Chrystall	Wellesley, MA
2016	Wyatt Goral	Andover, NJ
2015	Aaron Temple	Thornton, PA
2014	Noah Granigan	Doylestown, PA
2013	Peter Goguen	Hopedale, MA
2012	?	
2011	?	
2010	Kevin Mcguire	NY
2009	Gavin Mannion	Dedham, MA
2008	Nikolai Masluk	Middletown, NJ
2007	Shane Kline	Bally, PA
2006	Shane Kline	Bally, PA
2005	Shane Kline	Bally, PA
2004	Elliot Gaunt	Lockhaven, PA
2003	Matt Crane	Old Greenwich, CT
2002	Owen Nielsen	Roanoke, VA
2001	Robby Ketchell	Glen Spey, NY
2000	Not held	
1999	William Skinner	Monson, MA
1998	Dustin Rademacher	Monson, MA
1997	Dustin Rademacher	Monson, MA
1996	Lewis Elliott	Holden, MA
1995	Matt De Canio	Rapidan, VA
1994	Not held	
1993	Joseph Papp	Bethel Park, PA
1992	Paul LeBlanc	Colorado Springs, CO
1991	Glenn Milano	Media, PA
1990	George Hincapie	Farmingdale, NY
1989	Jonas Carney	Annandale, NJ
1988	George Hincapie	Farmingdale, NY
1987	Paul Willerton	Hollister, CA
1986	Ken Christoff	Grand Junction, CO
1985	Aaron Frahm	Greensboro, NC
1984	Dave Brinton	Studio City, CA
1983	Craig Schommer	Colorado Springs, CO
1982	Gregory Jannone	Bound Brook, NJ
1981	Neil Cormier	Stow, MA
1980	Jeff Lippincott	Princeton, NJ
1979	Adam Deutsch	Somerville, NJ
1978	Jeff Michaels	Enfield, CT
1977	Andy Weaver	Miami, FL
1976	Bruce Donaghy	Audubon, NJ
1975	Christopher Meingast	Detroit, MI
1974	Dale Stetina	Indianapolis, IN
1973	Scott McLean	North Hollywood, CA
1972	Keith Ward	Pennington, NJ
1971	Jesus Portalatin	Jamaica, NY
1970	Roger Young	Detroit, MI
1969	Gary Campbell	Paramount, CA
1968	Mike Hiltner	Rockville, MD
1967	Joe Perez	Newark, NJ
1966	Dave Chauner	Rosemont, PA
1965	Jeffrey Patton	Huntington Station, NY
1964	Vincent Morris	Hatboro, PA
1963	Oliver Martin	New York, NY
1962	Alan Grieco	Hackensack, NJ
1961	Ray Mathews	McLean, NJ
1960	Bobby Fenn	New York, NY
1959	Jackie Simes	Closter, NJ
1958	Preston Handy	New York, NY
1957	Ed Ruesing	University, MO
1956	Harvey Moore	Royal Oak, MI
1955	Don Carlin	Newark, NJ
1954	Vernon Hill	Kansas City, MO
1953	Ed Miller	Somerville, NJ
1952	Harry Tobin	Somerville, NJ
1951	Don Tokash	Somerville, NJ
1950	Hank McEwan	Woodcliff Lake, NJ
1949	Andy Werth	New York, NY

=== Multiple Winners - Junior ===
Wins	Rider	Editions
3	Shane Kline	2005, 2006, 2007
2	Dustin Rademacher	1997, 1998
2	George Hincapie	1988, 1990
2	Alexander Barr	2024, 2025

== Jaycee/John Chilseko Intermediate (13-15) ==
=== Winners ===
Year	Winner	Nationality/Home
1989	Race discontinued for Intermediate category	
1988	George Hincapie	Farmingdale, NY
1987	George Hincapie	Farmingdale, NY
1986	Vernon Sides	Reidsville, NC
1985	Trevor Silvera	Westbury, NY
1984	Michael Hakanson	Macungie, PA
1983	Rob Lattazi	Hamden, CT
1982	David Brinton	Studio City, CA
1981	Gordon Holterman	Petersburg, VA
1980	David Pederson	Bethesda, MD
1979	Dave Lettieri	Scranton, PA
1978	Tom Krogh Paulsen	Rockville, MD
1977	John Clowes	Bridgewater, NJ
1976	James Gesquiere	Detroit, MI
1975	Michael Rounds	Warwick, RI
1974	Bruce Donaghy	Audubon, NJ
1973	Mike Walter	Jersey City, NJ
1972	Alan Fella	Somerville, NJ
1971	Gary Bell	Somerville, NJ

=== Multiple Winners - Intermediate ===
Wins	Rider	Editions
2	George Hincapie	1987, 1988

== Jaycee/Alan Bell Midget (10-12) ==
=== Winners ===
Year	Winner	Nationality/Home
1989	Race discontinued for Midget category	
1988	Yani Feldman	Columbia, MD
1987	John Correia	North Tarrytown, NY
1986	Anthony Inturrisi	Hawthorne, NJ
1985	George Hincapie	Richmond Hill, NY
1984	George Hincapie	Richmond Hill, NY
1983	Jonas Carney	Annandale, NJ
1982	Brandon Ramey	Norfolk, VA
1981	Lisa Andreu	Dearborn, MI
1980	Celeste Andreu	Dearborn, MI
1979	Jim McCarthy	Allentown, PA
1978	Gordon Holterman	Petersburg, VA
1977	Sophie Eaton	Renfrew, PA
1976	Guillermo Lopez Jr.	Queens, NY
1975	Michael Grotz	Park Ridge, NJ
1974	Italo Bastianelli	Bricktown, NJ
1973	Italo Bastianelli	Bricktown, NJ
1972	Italo Bastianelli	Bricktown, NJ

=== Multiple Winners - Midget ===
Wins	Rider	Editions
3	Italo Bastianelli	1972, 1973, 1974
2	George Hincapie	1984, 1985
