= Eddie Borysewicz =

Polish-American cycling coach (1939–2020)

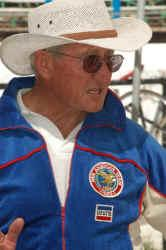

Personal information
- Full name: Edward Borysewicz
- Born: March 18, 1939 Poland
- Died: November 16, 2020 (aged 81) Drezdenko, Poland

Cycling career
- Sport: Cycling
- Rider type: Road, track

Amateur teams
- 1958–1964: Polish Junior Team
- Polish National Road Team

Managerial teams
- 1976–2004: Coach to junior national Polish team
- North Jersey Bicycle Club (circa 1977)
- Coach to USA team at 1980 and 1984 Olympics
- 1988 Sunkyong Amateur team
- 1989 Montgomery/Avenir Pro Cycling Team
- 1990 Subaru Montgomery Pro cycling team
- 1994 Montgomery Bell Pro Team
- 1996 US Postal Services team
- 2004 Discovery Channel Pro Cycling Team.

Major wins
- Polish National Junior Champion (twice); Polish National Champion (twice); Polish 'Master of Sport' award 30 national and world championships for coaching

Edward Borysewicz (March 18, 1939 – November 16, 2020), sometimes known as "Eddie B", was a cycling coach who brought the United States to world prominence, even though at first he barely spoke English. The US team, under his direction, won nine medals at the Olympic Games in Los Angeles in 1984. It was the first time Americans had won medals since 1912. Audrey McElmury won the World Road Cycling Championships in 1969, followed by Beth Heiden, in 1980.

== Background ==
Borysewicz was born in northeastern Poland, a region now a part of Belarus. He was originally a runner. He changed to cycling in his youth, quickly showing talent in races and twice becoming junior national champion. Two years of military national service followed, during which the army denied him a place in its sports battalion because, he said, his father was anti-communist. He was misdiagnosed with tuberculosis after leaving the army but recovered to win two more national championships. The effects of tuberculosis treatment, however, adversely affected his liver so he stopped racing and sought a degree in physical education at the university of Warsaw. He subsequently coached riders to 30 national and world championships, and among the champions he coached was Mieczysław Nowicki, later appointed Minister of Sport in Poland.

He went to the Olympic Games in Montreal in 1976 as assistant for the Polish team. He went from there to the state of New Jersey in the U.S., to see friends with whom he had raced for Poland. There he became associated with the North Jersey Bicycle Club, whose jersey he was wearing when he met Mike Fraysse, chairman of the American cycling federation's competition committee, in a cycle shop. The federation had gained money for coaching and support of athletes from President Jimmy Carter's inquiry into the domination in sport by what were perceived to be state-sponsored amateurs from communist countries. Fraysee spoke to Borysewicz about bringing his experience of Polish sports schools. They spoke in French because Borysewicz spoke no English. Next year the U.S. federation took on Borysewicz as its first full-time coach. His riders referred to him as "Eddie B" because they could not master his surname, pronounced Borisevich.

== National coach ==
Borysewicz opened an office at the U.S. Olympic Training Center in Squaw Valley, California. He said:

When I started, there was nothing. No office, nothing. I was the first guy, who don't speak English. I have only a telephone and have even to buy a desk. That was '78, OK? We make big steps. I have so many riders who win the Olympics, world championship medals.

His lack of English meant he had to use the son of a Polish friend, another cyclist, as a translator.

It really cuts your authority when you want to be commanding and you have to speak through a 12-year-old.

He told all but one member of the national team that they were overweight and observed that America was "a land of fat people".

He dispensed with established riders such as John Howard. Historian Peter Nye said:

Many suddenly former national team members became outspoken critics of the new national coach, claiming that he didn't understand the philosophy of US riders. Borysewicz's lack of English helped him miss much of the criticism as he introduced the concept that the team, not the individual, is what counts in racing. American racing over the years was marked by individuals going for the win rather than team tactics.

Among the first riders Borysewicz developed was Greg LeMond. He called him "a diamond, a clear diamond". That year, 1977, Sue Novara came second in the world sprint championship on the track and Connie Carpenter came second in the world road championship.

The US did not send a team to the Olympic Games in Moscow. The Russians and most other communist nations then stayed away from men's cycling at the Games in Los Angeles four years later. That lessened competition but the four gold, three silver, and one bronze medal were the first Americans had won since 1912.

== Blood doping scandal ==
America's successes at Los Angeles were colored by revelations that riders had blood transfusions before their events, a practice known as blood doping or blood boosting. The transfusions were to increase red blood cells in riders' blood, thus taking more oxygen to their muscles. They received the blood of others with similar blood types.

The French coach and former world champion, Daniel Morelon, told the sports paper L'Equipe that American medical treatment was "extremely elaborate". He added: "I didn't say they were taking drugs but on the other hand we and many others were still at the stage of trying our little vitamins." Steve Hegg won a gold and a silver; Rebecca Twigg, Pat McDonough and Leonard Nitz won silver medals. They were identified in the subsequent inquiry as having had transfusions. The others were John Beckman, Mark Whitehead and Brent Emery. The rest of the team refused. Transfusions were suggested by Eddie, by staff members or by the physician who oversaw the boosting, Dr. Herman Falsetti, a professor of cardiology at the University of Iowa.

Fraysse, who had brought Borysewicz's appointment as national coach, said: "We've been looking into this stuff for years and years and years. We weren't gonna fall behind the Russians or East Germans any more." The practice was not against Olympic rules although Games medical guidelines discouraged it. Ed Burke, without Borysewicz's knowledge or approval, set up a clinic in a Los Angeles motel room. Four of the seven athletes who had transfusions won medals. The US federation banned blood-doping in January 1985. Although Borysewicz denied involvement, both he and Burke were fined a month's pay. Fraysse was demoted from first to third vice-president.

== Professional coach ==
Eddie Borysewicz resigned as coach of the American national team in 1987 partly because of disagreements with members of his squad. He started his own amateur team in 1988. Sponsorship by Sunkyong, a Korean electronics firm, ended after a year and Borysewicz sought a replacement in Montgomery Securities. Its chief executive, Thomas Weisel, agreed to a team of 15 that included Lance Armstrong. That team, after several sponsorship changes, became the US Postal Service and Discovery Channel teams for which Armstrong won the Tour de France seven times before those victories were vacated in 2012 after the USADA ruled that Armstrong doped during each of those victories.

Borysewicz claimed Lance Armstrong as his discovery and not that of Armstrong's later coach, Chris Carmichael. When Carmichael said of his work at the US federation that he wished he had "five Lances", Borysewicz replied,

Why doesn't he (Chris Carmichael) produce Lances? That's his job. And anyway, Lance is not his product. Lance is my product.

== Personal life ==
He lived in Ramona, California. His house burned in the 2003 Cedar Fire that devastated San Diego County. Eddie received over 600 letters from friends and cyclists worldwide in response to his loss. Donations totaling $120,000 allowed him to rebuild his house.

== Death ==
After retiring from coaching in 2016, Borysewicz spent half the year in Ramona, California, and the other half in Poland. He died on November 16, 2020, at a hospital in Drezdenko, Poland, after contracting COVID-19. He was 81.

== Honors ==
- Borysewicz was inducted into the United States Bicycling Hall of Fame in 1996.
- Borysewicz was awarded the Super Master of Sports title, the country's highest award to athletes.
- Borysewicz received the "Father of Modern American Cycling" award at the Endurance Sports Awards in San Diego.

== See also ==
- List of doping cases in cycling
