= Nancy Neiman =

American cyclist

Nancy Neiman (married name Nancy Neiman Baranet) is an American cyclist, and the first American to compete in a European stage race.

She was the U.S. National Cycling Champion in 1953, 1954, 1956 and 1957 and was inducted into the US Bicycling Hall of Fame in 1992.

She wrote a memoir of her 1956 European racing experience, The Turned Down Bar.
