= Doris Kopsky Muller =

American cyclist

Personal information
- Born: 1922
- Died: 1997 (aged 74–75)

Cycling career
- Sport: Cycling
- Discipline: Amateur cyclist

Major wins
- New Jersey State Sprint Champion (1937, 1938, 1939)

Doris Kopsky Muller (1922–1997) was an American cyclist. She was the first woman to win a United States national title in cycling.

A 15-year-old resident of Belleville, New Jersey, she won the first United States national women's cycling championship, which was held in Buffalo, New York in 1937. Her father, Joseph Kopsky, had participated in the 1912 Olympic Games in Stockholm and started in the street race and trained his daughter.

At the 1937 U.S. National Championships, Muller started in two races on the track . She won over a mile and finished second in five miles. She was riding a bike her father had built with a big "D" on the stem. From 1937 to 1939 she was the champion of New Jersey. She married a cyclist, Paul Muller, and ended her athletic career.

She finished second in the 1939 United States Cycling National Championships.

In 1992, Doris Kopsky Muller was inducted into the United States Bicycling Hall of Fame.
