= McElmury =

McElmury is a surname. Notable people with the surname include:

- Audrey McElmury (1943–2013), American cyclist
- Jim McElmury (born 1949), American ice hockey player
