= Ellen Watters =

Canadian cyclist

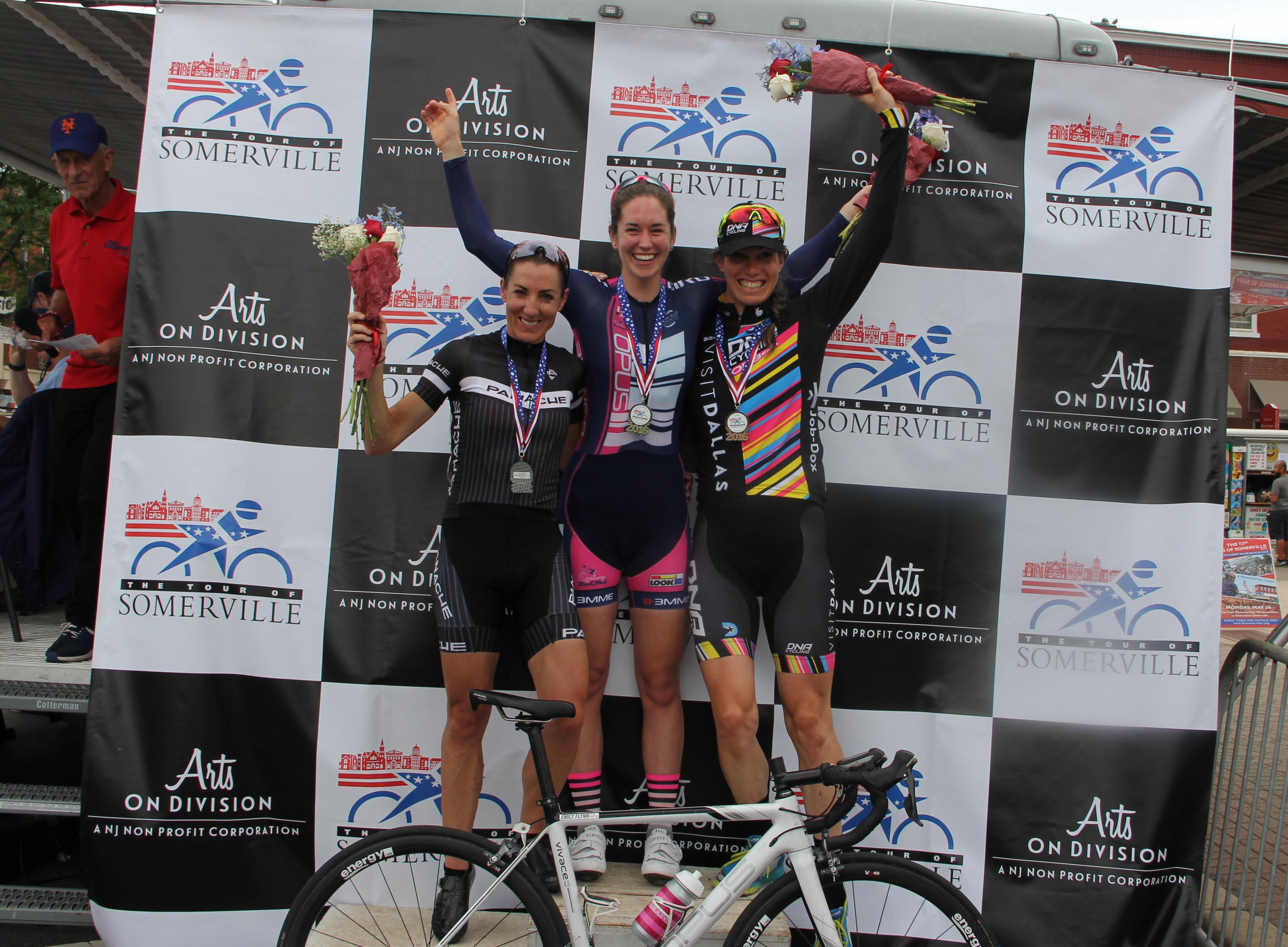
- The 2016 Mildred Kugler Women's Open winners. First place was Ellen Watters of Canada.

Personal information
- Full name: Ellen Leah Isabel Watters
- Born: 4 April 1988 Canada
- Died: 27 December 2016 (aged 28) Sussex, New Brunswick, Canada

Cycling career
- Sport: Cycling
- Discipline: Road
- Role: Rider
- Rider type: Stevens-The Cyclery (2014–2015); * The Cyclery-Opus (2016)

Professional team
- 2017: Colavita/Bianchi

Ellen Leah Isabel Watters (4 April 1988 – 27 December 2016) was a Canadian competitive cyclist from New Brunswick. She won first place in Tour of Somerville in 2016 and was a member of UCI team Colavita/Bianchi.

Watters joined the Stevens-The Cyclery (later The Cyclery-Opus) women's development team in 2014. She stayed with the team through the 2015 and 2016 seasons until she signed with UCI team Colavita/Bianchi for the 2017 season.

Watters died following a collision involving her bicycle and an automobile during a training ride in Sussex, New Brunswick on 23 December 2016. The driver struck her from behind as they were travelling in the same direction on a straight section of Riverview Dr East. She died in hospital of brain injuries four days later on 27 December 2016 at the age of 28. Her date of death has been wrongly reported as 28 December 2016.

Following her death, her family and friends called for the implementation of "Ellen's Law", which would require motorists to provide a minimum of 1-meter of distance when passing cyclists, increasing safety for cyclists within the province of New Brunswick. After the announcement of her death, hundreds of cyclists gathered in major cities calling for the implementation of the 1-meter law to be finalized in the provincial legislature. The law, which is already in place in many Canadian provinces, was introduced in the New Brunswick Legislature on 10 February 2017. The law was given royal assent on 5 May 2017, and came into effect on 1 June 2017. The push for "Ellen's Law" in New Brunswick also prompted the same one-metre law to protect cyclists to be passed in Prince Edward Island.
