= Shane Kline =

American cyclist (born 1989)

Personal information
- Full name: Shane Kline
- Born: April 11, 1989 (age 37) Bally, Pennsylvania, United States

Cycling career
- Sport: Cycling
- Current team: Team Skyline
- Disciplines: Road; Track
- Role: Rider

Amateur team
- 2018–2019: SmartStop Self Storage

Professional teams
- 2009: Kelly Benefit Strategies
- 2010–2011: Bissell
- 2012–2015: Team Smartstop–Mountain Khakis
- 2016–2017: Rally Cycling
- 2021–: Team Skyline

Shane Kline (born April 11, 1989) is an American cyclist, who currently rides for UCI Continental team Team Skyline.

== Major results ==
2005
2nd Road race, National Cadet Road Championships
2012
3rd TD Bank Mayor's Cup
2013
1st Dana Point Grand Prix
2nd TD Bank Mayor's Cup
2014
1st Thompson Bucks County Criterium
3rd TD Bank Mayor's Cup
5th White Spot / Delta Road Race
2016
3rd TD Bank Mayor's Cup
2017
1st Stage 4 Cascade Cycling Classic
1st Reading Radsport Criterium
2018
1st Team pursuit, National Track Championships
1st Tour of Somerville
2nd Road race, National Amateur Road Championships
2019
1st Reading Radsport Criterium
