= Jeanne Omelenchuk =

American speed skater

Personal information
- Full name: Jeanne Marie Omelenchuk
- Born: March 25, 1931; Detroit, Michigan, United States
- Died: June 26, 2008 (aged 77); Lapeer, Michigan, United States

Sport
- Sport: Speed skating

Jeanne Marie Omelenchuk (March 25, 1931 – June 26, 2008) was an American speed skater. She competed at the 1960, 1968 and the 1972 Winter Olympics. As a cyclist, she won the 1952 and 1955 amateur women's United States National Championship.
