= Margaret Gast =

German-born American racing cyclist

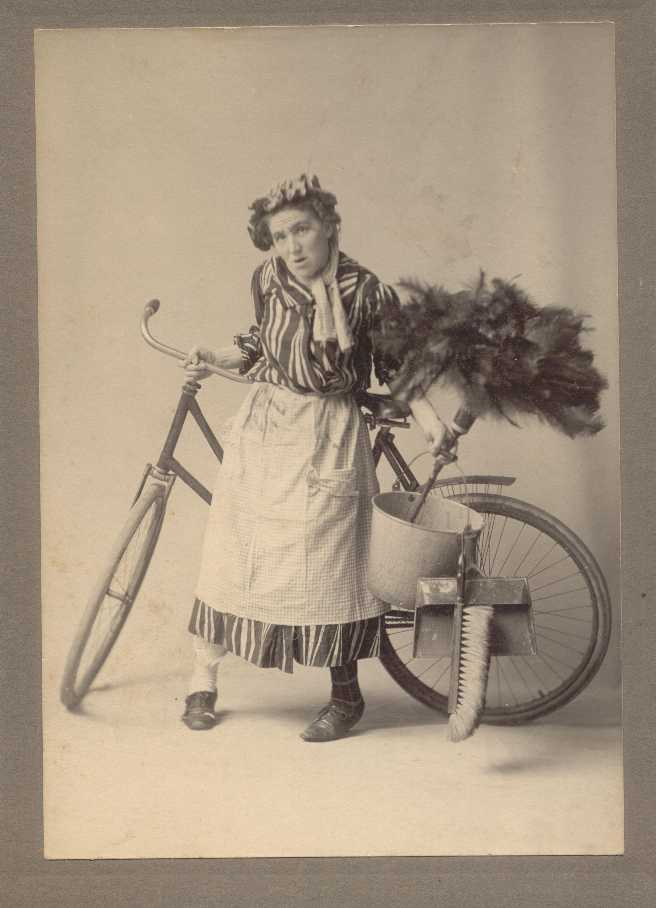
Margaret Gast posing for a ladies' Magazine in 1905

Margaret Gast (2 November 1876 - 13 April 1968) was a German-born American racing cyclist.

At the age of 16 Margaret Gast (original German name "Margareta Nagengast") emigrated from Bavaria in the German Empire to the United States. From 1893 or 1894 until 1901 she was one of the dominating female racing cyclists in the States. In 1900 she established four endurance records, about 500, 1000, 2000 and 2500 miles. She also rode motor-paced cycling races. Later on, "Little Duchy" as she was called, rode races on motorcycles herself and made stunts.

After her retreat from sport at the beginning of the 1920s Gast learned the profession of physiotherapist, at which she worked until she was very old. In 1931 her studio was destroyed by a fire. She also ran a pub called "The Little Dutchess Inn".

In 1993 Gast was inducted to the United States Bicycling Hall of Fame.
