= Donald Sheldon (cyclist) =

American cyclist

Personal information
- Born: May 26, 1930 Jersey City, New Jersey, United States
- Died: June 11, 2015 (aged 85) Palmerston North, New Zealand

Cycling career
- Sport: Cycling

Donald Sheldon (May 26, 1930 – June 11, 2015) was an American cyclist. He competed in three events at the 1952 Summer Olympics. He also won the Tour of Somerville in 1947 and 1948.
