= Hans Wolf =

American cyclist

Personal information
- Born: September 8, 1940 (age 86) Bad Doberan, Germany

Cycling career
- Sport: Cycling

Hans Joachim Wolf (born September 8, 1940) is an American former cyclist. He competed in the team pursuit event at the 1964 Summer Olympics. Wolf had also won the 1964 Tour of Somerville.
