= Tillie Anderson =

Swedish-American cyclist (1875–1965)

Tillie Anderson (April 23, 1875 – April 29, 1965) was a road and track cyclist. Born in Skåne, Sweden in 1875, Anderson emigrated to Chicago in 1891 at the age of 16. At 18, she had saved enough money working as a seamstress to buy her first bicycle. During the summer of 1895, she took part in the race over the Elgin-Aurora (Ill.) century course and broke the century record. She later traveled around the country taking part in six-day bicycle races for women, which involved racing at top speed two hours each evening for six consecutive days. Anderson was 20 years old when the League of American Wheelmen recognized her as the best woman cyclist in the world. In 2000, Anderson was posthumously inducted into the United States Bicycling Hall of Fame.

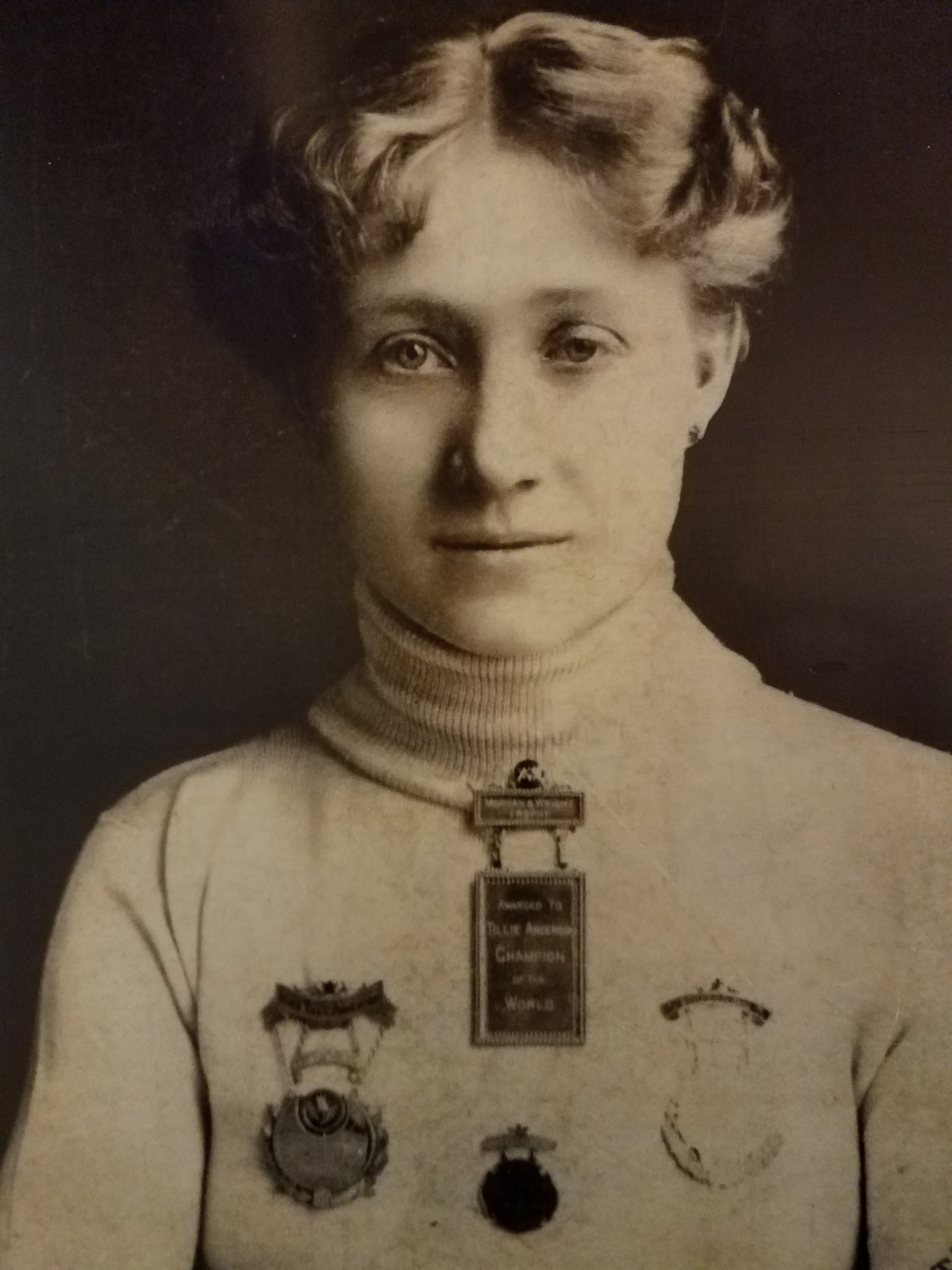
Tillie Anderson with medals.

== Record-holder as a cycling star ==
Anderson held records for distance from sprinting to endurance. She once rode a half-mile in 52 seconds; on another occasion she rode 100 miles in 6 hours, 52 minutes and 15 seconds. She is reported to have entered 130 races in her career and was first over the finish mark in all but seven races. She remained active in her career until retiring in 1902, when women were barred from racing due in part to the level of danger involved in the sport and the suppression of women in sports.

== Marriage ==
At the height of her career, Tillie Anderson married her trainer and manager, J. P. "Phil" Sjöberg, in December 1897. Sjöberg, a former racer himself, gave up his racing career to manage Anderson's. Sjöberg developed tuberculosis shortly after their marriage and died in 1901. Anderson, widowed at age 26, never remarried.

== Pioneering career ==
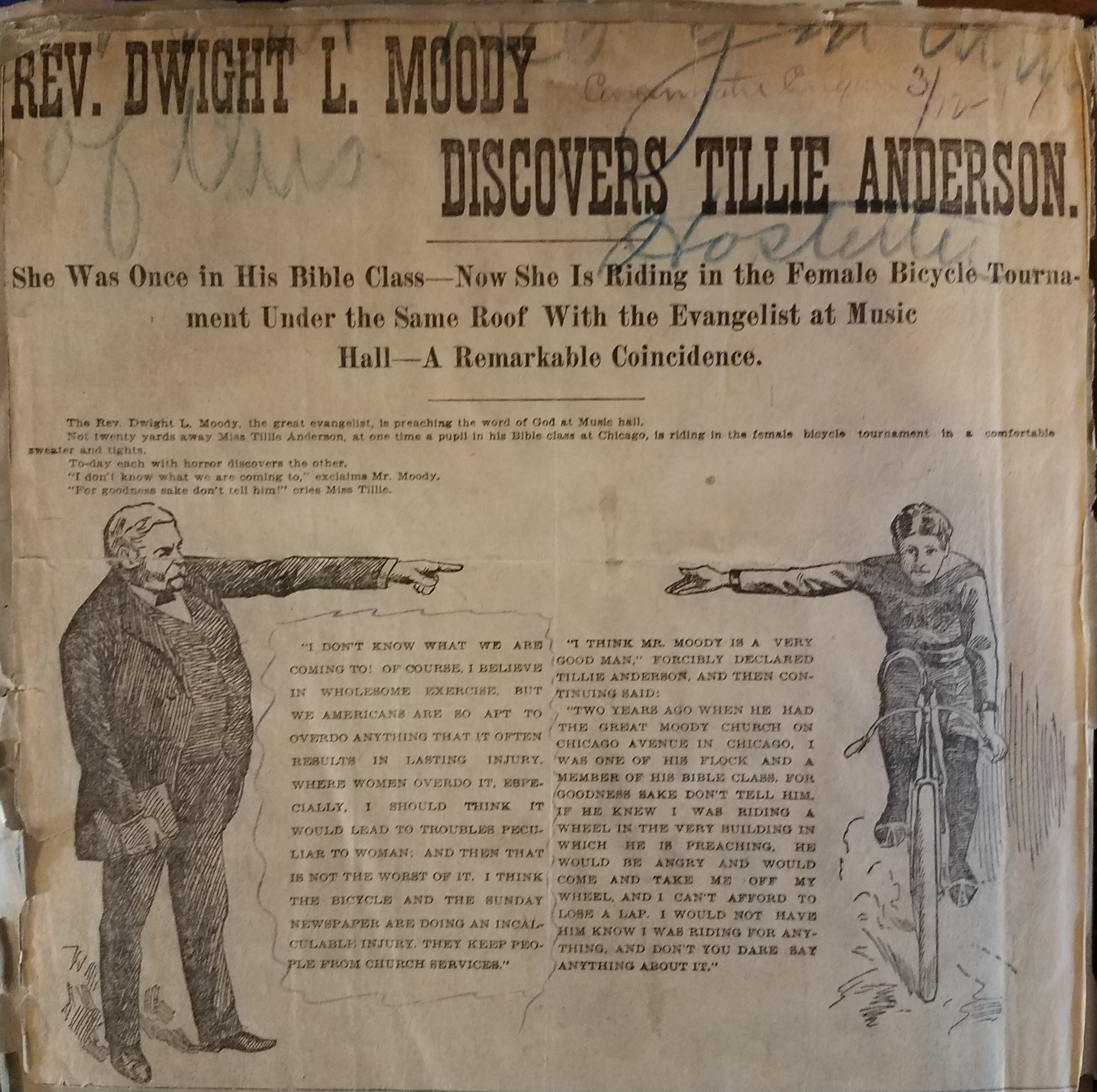
The St. Louis Republic, December 13, 1897

Many people - including Anderson's mother, brother, and her Bible teacher Reverend Dwight L. Moody - disapproved of women riding bicycles, not to mention competing in racing events wearing tight fitting clothing and where gambling was known to have occurred. But others felt differently. In 1896, at which point Anderson had been the undisputed ladies' cycling champion of the world for over a year, Susan B. Anthony was quoted as saying, "Let me tell you what I think of bicycling. It has done more to emancipate women than anything else in the world. It gives a woman a feeling of freedom and self-reliance. I stand by and rejoice every time I see a woman ride by on a wheel...the picture of free, untrammeled womanhood."

== Legacy ==
Anderson remained an advocate for bicycling through the years and often boasted about keeping within four pounds of her racing weight throughout her life. Anderson served as an advocate for the development of bicycle paths in Chicago's city parks. She remained active in the League of American Wheelman and the Bicycle Stars of the Nineteenth Century organizations until her death in 1965 at the age of 90. For her achievements in cycling in both road and track events, Anderson was inducted into the United States Bicycling Hall of Fame in 2000.

== Personal life ==
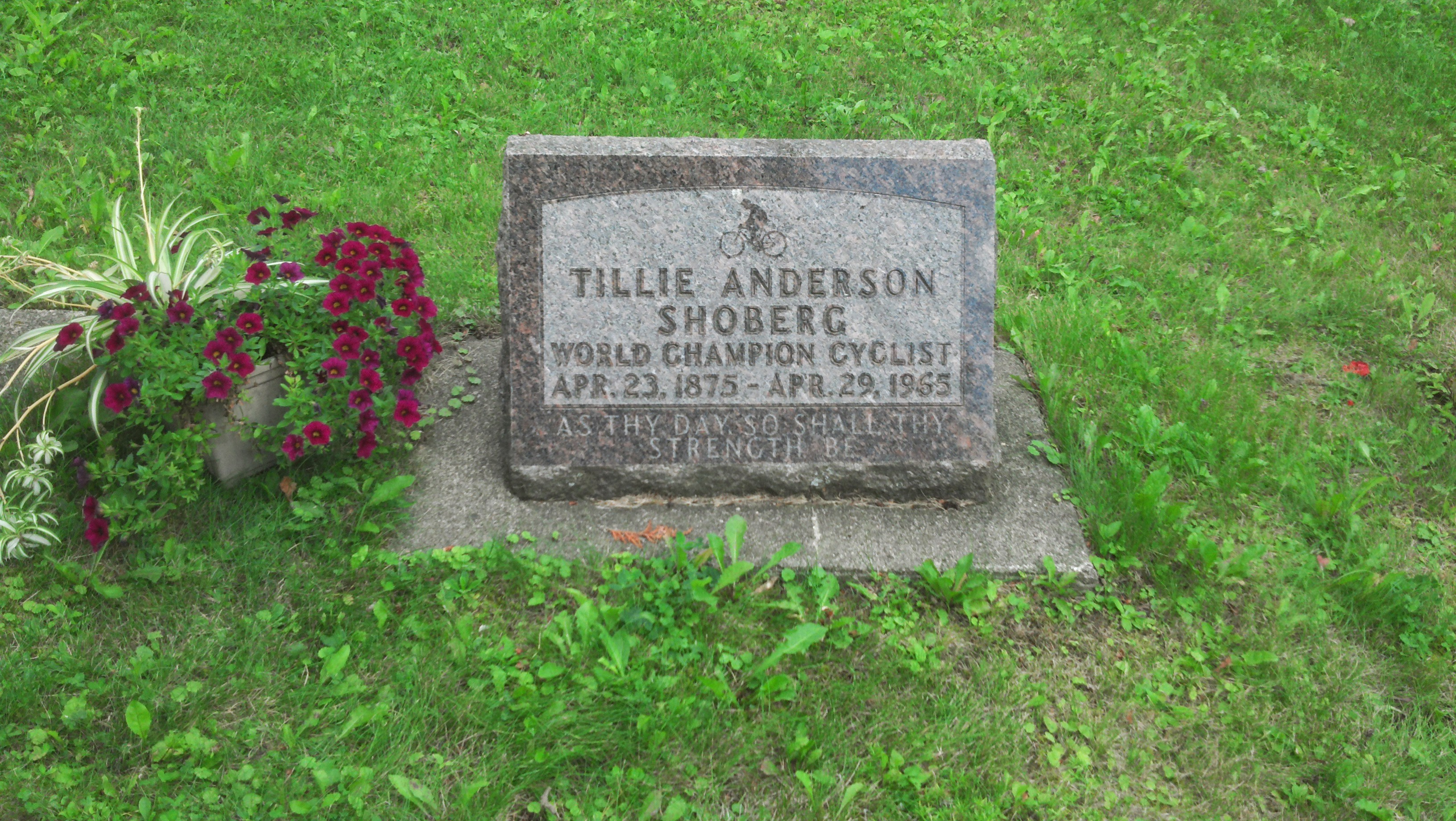

Anderson was born April 23, 1875, in Skåne, Sweden, to Anders Bengtsson and Sara Ann-Marie Nilsdotter. Anderson migrated to Chicago, IL, in 1891, and married J.P. "Phil" Shoberg (Sjöberg) in December 1897. Shoberg later died from difficulties with tuberculosis in February 1902 in Los Angeles, California, and was buried in Evergreen Cemetery. Anderson died April 29, 1965 (age 90) in Detroit Lakes, Minnesota. She was buried in Immanuel Lutheran Church cemetery in Osage, Minnesota.
