= Allen Bell (cyclist) =

American cyclist (1933–2026)

Personal information
- Born: October 11, 1933 Ashley, Pennsylvania, U.S.
- Died: March 10, 2026 (aged 92)

Cycling career
- Sport: Cycling

Allen Charles Bell (October 11, 1933 – March 10, 2026) was an American cyclist. He competed at the 1956 Summer Olympics and the 1960 Summer Olympics. He was a medalist four times at the United States Amateur National Cycling Championships, once as a junior. In 1994 he was elected to the United States Bicycling Hall of Fame. Bell died on March 10, 2026, at the age of 92.
