= James Rossi =

American cyclist

Personal information
- Born: April 12, 1936 Chicago, Illinois, United States
- Died: September 3, 2005 (aged 69) Des Plaines, Illinois, United States

Cycling career
- Sport: Cycling

James Rossi (April 12, 1936 – September 3, 2005) was an American cyclist. He competed at the 1956 Summer Olympics and the 1960 Summer Olympics. He won the United States Cycling National Championships five times from 1959 to 1963 and placed second in 1956.
