= Joseph Kopsky =

American cyclist (1882–1974)

Personal information
- Born: November 2, 1882 New York, New York, United States
- Died: January 30, 1974 (aged 91) Miami, Florida, United States

Cycling career
- Sport: Cycling

Joseph Kopsky (November 4, 1882 – January 30, 1974) was an American cyclist. He was born in New York City. He competed in two events at the 1912 Summer Olympics. On May 5, 1912, he set a record for 150 miles, in 8:26.27. He moved to Miami, Florida, after World War Two. In 2001 he was inducted into the United States Bicycling Hall of Fame.
