= Karen Bliss =

American cyclist

Personal information
- Full name: Karen Bliss
- Born: December 19, 1963 (age 62) Lewisburg, Pennsylvania, United States

Cycling career
- Sport: Cycling

Karen Bliss was born on December 19, 1963, in Lewisburg, Pennsylvania. She is a former American cyclist, four-time U.S. points race champion and a three-time U.S. criterium champion. On November 2, 2019, in Davis California, she was inducted into the United States Bicycling Hall of Fame in the category Modern Road & Track Competitor.

== Early life and career ==
Karen Bliss was born in Lewisburg, PA, and grew up in Quakertown, Pennsylvania. She competed for 10 years in swimming leagues. Bliss attended Quakertown High School where she played field hockey. and graduated from the Pennsylvania State University in 1985 where she joined a cycling club. She began her career as the "sprint specialist" in small road and criterium races. She graduated from the University of Florida with a master's degree in 1997. She is married to Robert Jellen.

== Retirement ==
In 1998, Karen Bliss retired from cycling after winning over 300 races. Karen Bliss went on to work in the bicycle industry. She was the Chief Marketing Officer and then President of Advanced Sports Enterprises, the company that owned the Fuji bicycle brand which was her first bike sponsor.
