= David Boll =

American cyclist

Personal information
- Born: May 5, 1953 (age 73) Hackensack, New Jersey, United States

Cycling career
- Sport: Cycling

David Boll (born May 5, 1953) is an American former cyclist. He competed in the individual road race event at the 1976 Summer Olympics.
