= James Lauf =

American cyclist (born 1927)

Personal information
- Born: November 1, 1927 (age 98) Baltimore, Maryland, U.S.

Cycling career
- Sport: Cycling

James George Lauf (born November 1, 1927) is an American cyclist. He competed in the 4,000 metres team pursuit at the 1952 Summer Olympics.
