= Washington Park Velodrome =

Open-air velodrome in Kenosha, Wisconsin

Kenosha Velodrome
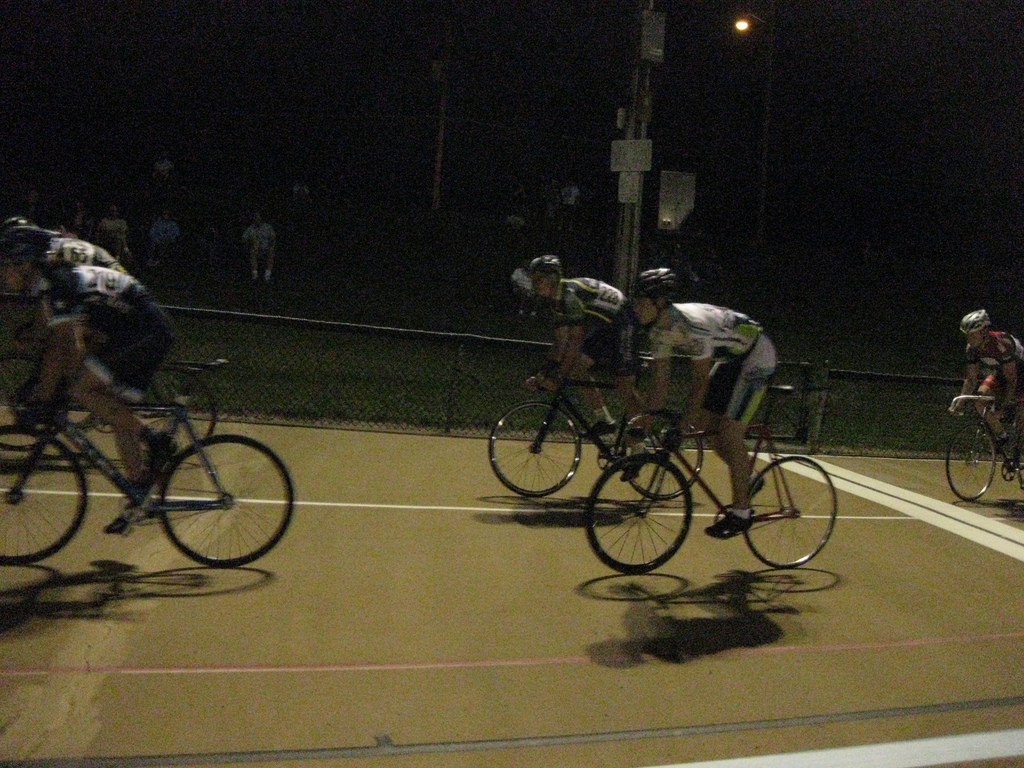
- The Kenosha Velodrome
- Interactive map of Kenosha Velodrome
- Location: Kenosha, Wisconsin, U.S.
- Coordinates: 42°35′57.7″N 87°49′49.8″W
- Surface: Concrete
- Field size: 333.3 m (364.5 yd) track
- Public transit: Kenosha Area Transit

Construction
- Opened: 1927

Website
- Kenosha Velodrome

The Washington Park Velodrome is an open-air velodrome in Kenosha, Wisconsin. It is the longest operating 333 meter track in the United States. The track opened in 1927.

== Recent history ==
During the 2016 season, the track was closed and completely rebuilt. In an August 2022 news report, the velodrome's outer safety fencing was damaged during a Sunday, July 31 incident involving an unlicensed teen automobile driver.

== Gallery ==
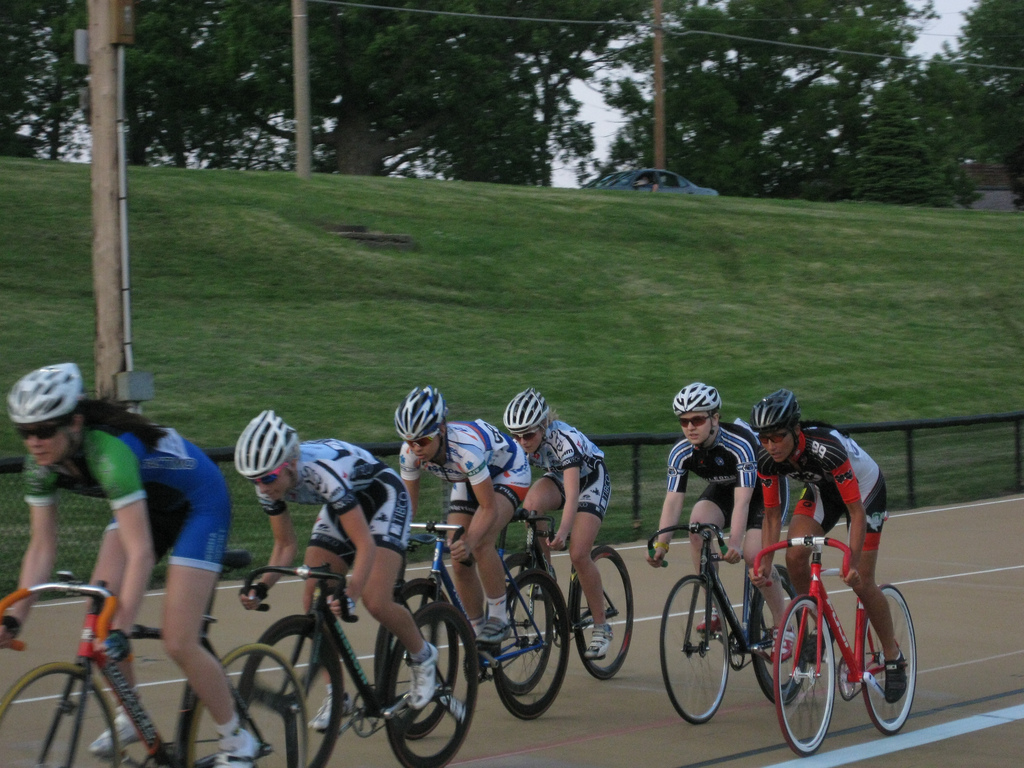
Kenosha Velodrome Tuesday Night Racing

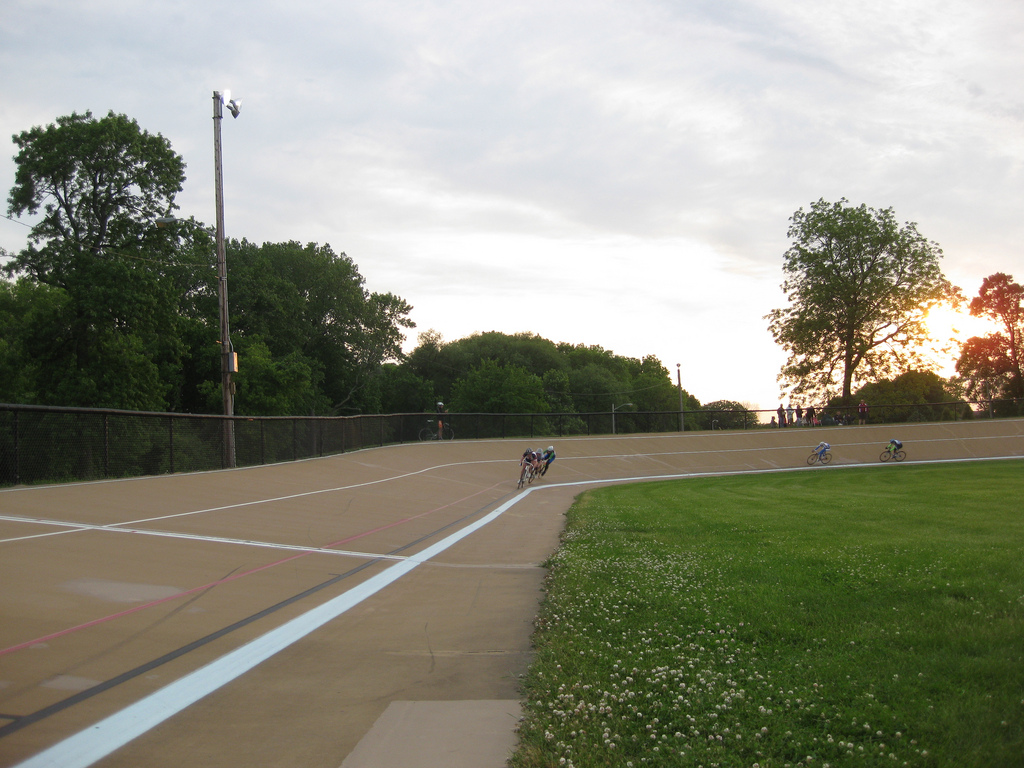
Tuesday Night Racing, Kenosha Veldrome

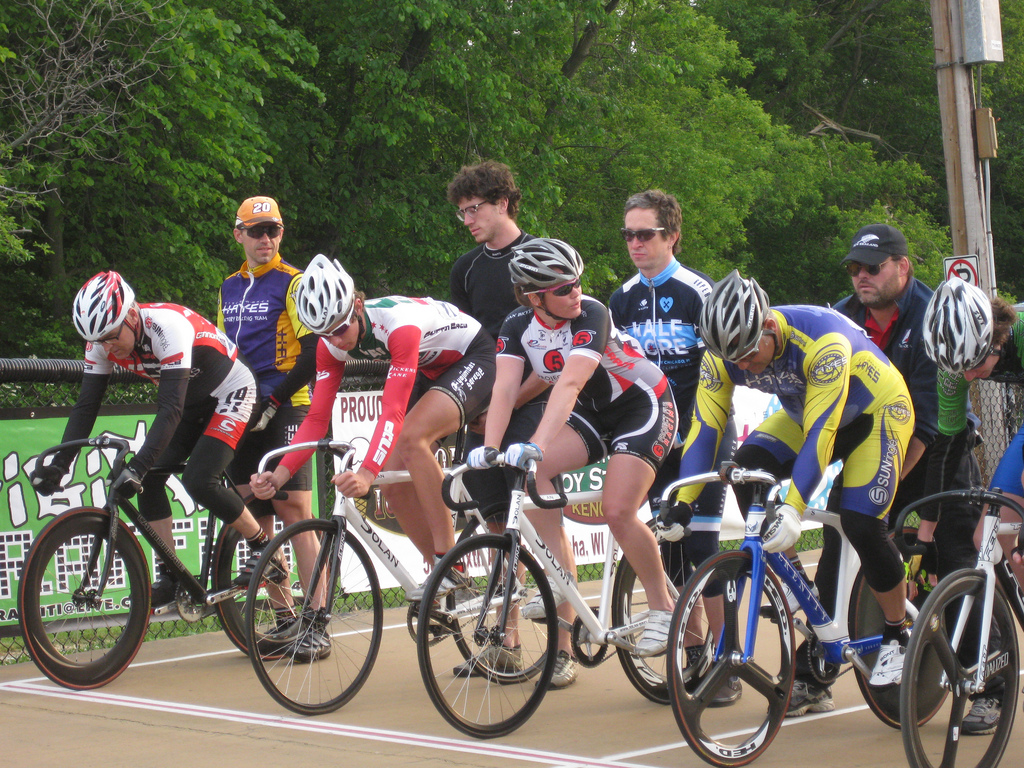
Tuesday Night Racing

== See also ==
- List of cycling tracks and velodromes
