= Robert Pfarr =

American cyclist (1920–2006)

Personal information
- Born: July 24, 1920 Kenosha, Wisconsin, United States
- Died: October 15, 2006 (aged 86) Somers, Wisconsin, United States

Cycling career
- Sport: Cycling

Robert Pfarr (July 24, 1920 – October 15, 2006) was an American cyclist. He competed in the team pursuit at the 1960 Summer Olympics. Pfarr also won the Wisconsin bicycle racing championship 12 times and in 1951 he was selected to represent the United States at the Pan American Games in Buenos Aires. He won the 1950 United States Cycling National Championships and finished second in 1960.
