= Jack Disney =

American cyclist (1930–2024)

Personal information
- Born: June 15, 1930 Topeka, Kansas, U.S.
- Died: April 17, 2024 (aged 93)

Cycling career
- Sport: Cycling
Medal record
Men's cycling
Representing United States
Pan American Games
Silver medal – second place	1959 United States	1000 m Match Sprint

Jack Wayne Disney (June 15, 1930 – April 17, 2024) was an American cyclist. He competed at the 1956, 1964 and the 1968 Summer Olympics.

Disney won the United States Cycling National Championships five years in a row from 1954 to 1958 and finished third in 1961 and 1962. He died on April 17, 2024, at the age of 93.
