= Karen Strong-Hearth =

Canadian cyclist

Personal information
- Born: 23 September 1953 (age 73) Toronto, Canada

Cycling career
- Sport: Cycling

Karen Strong-Hearth (born 23 September 1953) is a Canadian former cyclist. She competed in the women's road race event at the 1984 Summer Olympics.
