= Ron Skarin =

American cyclist

Personal information
- Born: November 9, 1951 (age 74) Los Angeles, California, United States

Cycling career
- Sport: Cycling

Ron Skarin (born November 9, 1951) is an American former cyclist. He competed at the 1972 Summer Olympics and 1976 Summer Olympics.

Skarin won ten national titles, including the Team Pursuit 1971, 1972, 1974, 1975, 1976 and 1977, Individual Pursuit 1975, Ten mile 1976, Points Race 1978 and Madis in 1981. He was Gold Medalist in the team pursuit at the Pan American Games in Mexico City in 1975. He broke the men's hour record in May 1979 at Ontario Motor Speedway, completing 51.310 km in one hour.

Skarin was director of the U.S. Cycling Federation in 1979-80.
