= Art Longsjo =

American speed skater and cyclist

Personal information
- Born: October 23, 1931 Fitchburg, Massachusetts, U.S.
- Died: September 16, 1958 (aged 26) Burlington, Vermont, U.S.

Sport
- Country: United States
- Sport: Speed skating

Achievements and titles
- Olympic finals: 1956 Winter Olympics; 1956 Summer Olympics

Arthur "Art" Matthew Longsjo Jr. (October 23, 1931 – September 16, 1958) was an American Olympian speed skater and cyclist. He was the first American to compete in the Summer and Winter Olympics in the same year.

== Biography ==
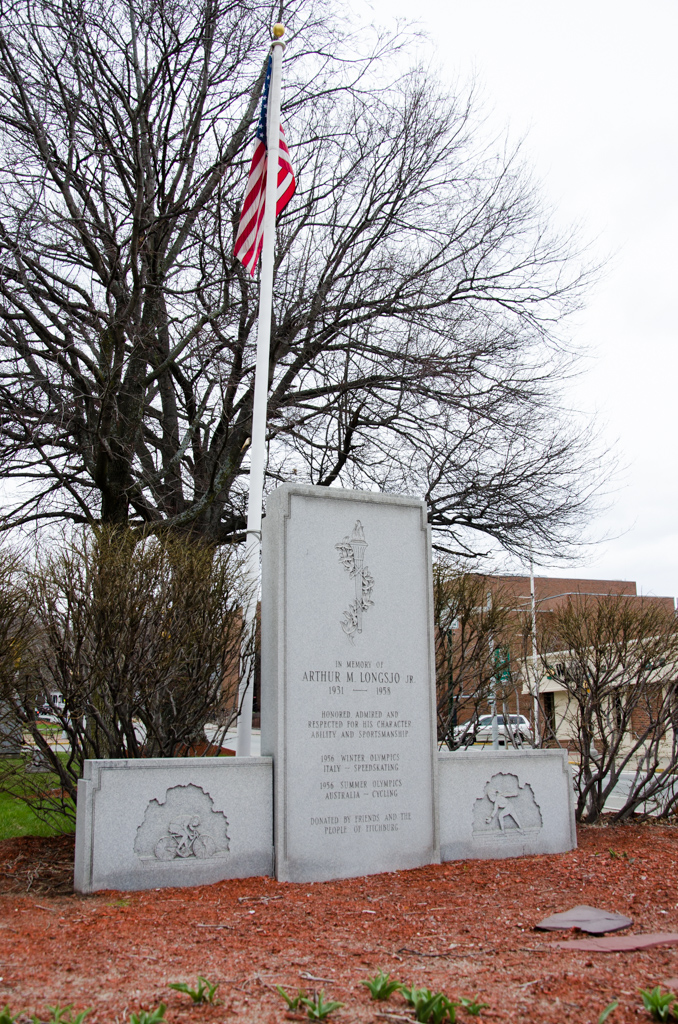
Memorial marker for Arthur Longsjo in Fitchburg, Massachusetts.

Longsjo was born in Fitchburg, Massachusetts. In 1953, he won the 1 mile, 3 mile, and 25 mile races at the Massachusetts State Cycling Championships after riding his bicycle 1.5 hours to the race (from Fitchburg to Westborough, Massachusetts). In 1954, he won the Quebec-Montreal Road Race and was named the Canadian Cyclist of the Year. He won the race again in 1956.

Longsjo won the 5,000 m speed skating event at the United States national championships to make the Olympic team at the Winter Olympics. In 1956, he competed in both the Winter Olympics as a speed skater and the Summer Olympics as a cyclist. Due to a knee injury before the games, he placed outside the medal stand. Longsjo was the first American to compete in both the Winter and Summer Olympics in the same year.

In 1958 Longsjo won three races, the Tour of Somerville, the Tour du St. Laurent stage race and the Quebec-Montreal Road Race.

Longsjo died in 1958 following a car accident in Burlington, Vermont. He had been returning from the Quebec-Montreal Road Race.

== Awards and honors ==
In 1960 the Fitchburg Longsjo Classic was held in Fitchburg in memory of Longsjo. The race was a road bicycle racing stage race that was held annually until 2019. On March 18, 2020, event organizers announced that the event was being retired.

Longsjo was inducted into the National Speedskating Hall of Fame in 1970, and the U.S. Bicycling Hall of Fame in 1988.
