= Audrey McElmury =

American cyclist (1943–2013)

Personal information
- Full name: Audrey McElmury, nee Phleger
- Born: January 24, 1943 Northampton, Massachusetts, U.S.
- Died: March 26, 2013 (aged 70) Bozeman, Montana, U.S.

Cycling career
- Sport: Cycling
- Disciplines: Road & Track
- Role: Rider

Major wins
- 1969 UCI Road World Championships; 1969 USA National Omnium Championship; 1970 USA National Pursuit Championship; 1970 USA National Road Championship; 1970 - USA National hour record, 24.8 miles
Medal record
Women's track cycling
Representing United States
UCI Road World Championships
Gold medal – first place	1969 Brno	Road race

Audrey McElmury (born Audrey Phleger, January 24, 1943 in Northampton, Massachusetts – March 26, 2013 in Bozeman, Montana) was the first American cyclist to win the Road World Championship. She won in Brno, Czechoslovakia in 1969, having fallen and remounted her bike. Hers was the United States' first world cycling championship since Frank Kramer won the professional sprint race in 1912 and the first ever in road cycling.

== Background ==
Audrey McElmury grew up in La Jolla, California, where her first sport was horse jumping, followed by surfing. She began cycling after breaking her leg after falling from a skate board in 1960. She won the Californian cycling championship in 1964, riding on velodromes because there was no other racing for women. She trained with men on the road, getting up at 4.30am for the first of two daily rides. She said the regime ended her marriage. She won the national pursuit title and the first national road championship in 1966.

== Cycling career ==
McElmury rode the world championship in Imola in 1968 and finished fifth in a race that ended in a sprint. She was picked again for the championship in Czechoslovakia the following year. The American cycling federation did not have the money to pay all the fares for the three women. It cost her $10,000 with fares, lodging and meals. Writers Alice Kovler and James McCullagh said: "The argument against funding women was based essentially on the fact that there were so few of them competing, and the dues paid by these [to the national federation] amounted to very little.

The races were held on the anniversary of the Soviet Union's occupation of the country after the Prague Spring. The cycling historian Peter Nye wrote:

Tanks were everywhere, up and down every street, and soldiers were armed with machine guns. The Czechs were anti-communist and pro-American.; they cheered the U.S. riders wildly in the races and booed the Russians. When the Russians won, the Czechs even walked out of the medal ceremonies.

McElmury rode both track and road. She came seventh in the 3,000m pursuit race, then later rode the 62 km road race on her own road bike that was made by Johnny Berry in Manchester, UK. She said:

The pavement [road surface] was somewhat chewed up from the tank treads. The course was one that suited my riding. I was good in the hills, and I time-trialled well. On about the third lap, it started pouring buckets. On the fourth lap, I got away on the hill by about 15 seconds, but I fell down while putting on the brakes in a corner on the descent. The pack caught me as I got up. The rain was chilly enough that I didn't feel the full effect of my bruised hip, and the rain exaggerated the amount of blood from a cut on my elbows. I chased the pack with an ambulance following me to see if I was all right.

McElmury regained the field on the last lap and then went clear again on the hill. She finished 1m 10s ahead of a British rider, Bernadette Swinnerton. Her victory was so unexpected that the award ceremony was delayed half an hour while officials searched for a recording of the American national anthem.

When McElmury returned to the USA, a local television reporter wanted to know less about her world championship than the anniversary of the Russian invasion. Other coverage was also scant. In France, Miroir du Cyclisme predicted a rise in the prominence of American women cyclists with a cartoon that changed the graffiti "US go home!" to "US go femme!"

James McCullagh wrote:

Not surprisingly, she received more attention in Europe than she did in America. Europeans understood and appreciated her ride. Accordingly, she was immediately engaged by the Italian team, to ride for them and eventually coach them. Returning to this country [USA], McElmury still found it difficult to obtain travel expenses even though she was a strong enough rider to hold her own on the criterium circuit with the best American men, usually finishing in the top ten.

In 1969 she won the national omnium championship, in 1970 the pursuit and road championships. She set the national hour record, 24.8 miles at the Encino velodrome in California and held it from 1969 to 1990. McElmury retired from cycling after a crash in 1974 and took up running. She and husband Michael Levonas continued to coach cyclists and triathletes in San Diego until they left the area, retiring in West Yellowstone, Montana.

== Personal life ==
McElmury married two cyclists, first Scott McElmury whom she met in 1958, when she was 15, and, in 1971, former Pan Am team member and multiple title champion Michael Levonas. She obtained a degree in zoology from the University of California, San Diego and had a son born in 1967.

Toward the end of her cycling career, McElmury and Levonas obtained business degrees at the University of Denver in hotel and restaurant management. The two then traveled through western states, Colorado, California, Oregon, Washington, Idaho and Montana, working in the food service industry. They retired in 1996 to West Yellowstone, Montana. They wrote a book, Bicycle Training for Triathletes *and Others based on their coaching. Audrey is featured in a chapter devoted to her in the track cycling reference "NO BRAKES! Bicycle Track Racing in the United States" published in 1996.

McElmury was inducted into the United States Bicycling Hall of Fame in 1989. Her World Champion 1969 Johnny Berry bicycle was once on loan to the Hall of Champions in San Diego, California, but has now been returned to its owner.
