= Mike Fraysse =

Mike Fraysse (born July 30, 1943) was president of the United States Cycling Federation from 1979 to 1981 and from 1994 to 1998. Fraysse was a member of the USCF's board of directors from 1969 to 1994. He managed US Olympic cycling teams in 1976 and 1984. He was three times president of the UCI's Pan American Cycling Confederation, and received the UCI Merit Award.

== Cycling management and coaching ==
Fraysse was team manager of the US squad at the Pan American Games in 1975, and he coached the US team at 14 world championships. In recognition of his service to international cycling, and his work with Borysewicz, Fraysse was also presented with life membership and the Medal of Distinction by the Polish cycling federation. He was inducted into the United States Bicycling Hall of Fame in 1998.

Fraysse has had a hand in the development of many elite American cyclists, including: Greg LeMond, Ron Kiefel, Alexi Grewal, Andrew Hampsten, Davis Phinney, Betsy Davis, Mike Friedman, Christian Stahl, Connie Carpenter, Rebecca Twigg, Beth Heiden, Eric Heiden, Lance Armstrong, and Steve Woznik. Fraysse was also involved in product development for the bicycle industry, and in 1979 he built the first aerodynamic frame with tear-drop tubing, which was ridden by LeMond to a silver medal in that year's junior world championship. He also designed the Concor bicycle saddle.

== Present day ==
Fraysse has been a resident of Teaneck, New Jersey. He owned Park Cycle in Ridgefield Park, New Jersey, for 30 years, and runs a private training facility for élite and recreational athletes in Glen Spey, New York. Fraysse said: "I had a dream to do my own training center so I didn't have the restrictions of the Olympic Committee of the Fed (cycling federation) and do it the way I thought it should be done. I looked all over the country, wherever I went on a trip, I looked."

Fraysse owns Burn Brae Mansion in Glen Spey, NY. In addition to cycling training and camps, the mansion is a popular destination for paranormal investigations and has been the setting for television shows such as Ghost Hunters, Psychic Kids, and Stranded.
