= Alan Grieco =

American cyclist

Personal information
- Born: May 7, 1946 (age 80) Lyndhurst, New Jersey, U.S.
- Height: 5 ft 11 in (180 cm)
- Weight: 165 lb (75 kg)

Cycling career
- Sport: Cycling

Professional team
- ?: Century Road Club

Alan Grieco (born May 7, 1946) is a former American cyclist. He competed in the men's sprint at the 1964 Summer Olympics.
