= Frank Brilando =

American cyclist (1925–2019)

Personal information
- Born: June 29, 1925 Chicago, Illinois, United States
- Died: May 5, 2019 (aged 93) Niles, Illinois, United States

Cycling career
- Sport: Cycling

Frank Brilando (June 29, 1925 – May 5, 2019) was an American cyclist. He competed at the 1948 and 1952 Summer Olympics.

He finished 3rd at the 1948 United States Cycling National Championships.
