= Ted Smith (cyclist) =

American cyclist

Personal information
- Born: August 9, 1928 Cheektowaga, New York, United States
- Died: May 8, 1992 (aged 63) Cheektowaga, New York, United States

Cycling career
- Sport: Cycling

Theodore Richard "Ted" Smith (August 9, 1928 – May 8, 1992) was an American cyclist. He competed in the team pursuit event at the 1948 Summer Olympics.
