= Richard Cortright =

American cyclist

Richard Willis Cortright
Personal information
- Born: October 13, 1929 Buffalo, New York, United States
- Died: September 4, 2009 (aged 79) Cheektowaga, New York, United States

Cycling career
- Sport: Cycling

Richard Cortright (October 13, 1929 – September 4, 2009) was an American cyclist. He competed at the 1952, 1956 and 1960 Summer Olympics.

He finished third at the 1954 and 1960 United States Cycling National Championships.
