= Six Days of Chicago =

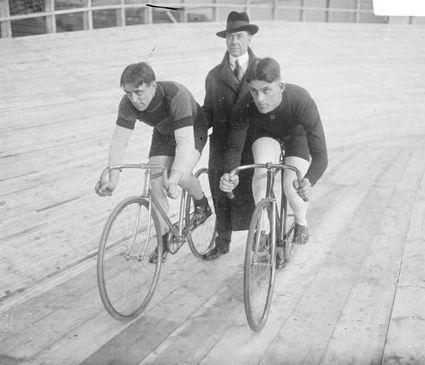
- Francesco Verri and Reggie McNamara in 1917

Race details
- Region: Chicago, United States
- Discipline: Track
- Type: Six-day race

History
- First edition: 1915
- Editions: 50
- Final edition: 1957
- First winner: (Switzerland) Oscar Egg (Italy) Francesco Verri
- Most wins: (Germany) Gustav Kilian (6 wins)
- Final winner: (Netherlands) Peter Post (Netherlands) Harm Smits

The Six Days of Chicago was a six-day cycling event, held in Chicago, Illinois between 1915 and 1957. It took place fifty times during that period, as two editions were often held in one year. Gustav Kilian holds the record for most wins with a total of six, between 1935 and 1939.

== Roll of honor ==
| Edition | Winners | Second | Third |
|---|---|---|---|
| 1915 (1) | (Switzerland) Oscar Egg (Italy) Francesco Verri | (United States) Jimmy Moran (Australia) Reginald McNamara | (United States) Clarence Carman (Australia) Frank Corry |
| 1915 (2) | (United States) William Hanley (United States) Percy Lawrence | (United States) Martin Ryan (United States) Lloyd Thomas | (Australia) Gordon Walker (United States) Robert Walthour |
| 1916 | (Australia) Robert Spears (Australia) Reginald McNamara | (United States) Percy Lawrence (United States) Jake Magin | (United States) George Cameron (United States) Harry Kaiser |
| 1917 | (Italy) Francesco Verri (Australia) Reginald McNamara | (Australia) Frank Corry (United States) Jake Magin | (United States) Peter Drobach (United States) Eddy Madden |
| 1918-1920 | Not held | | |
| 1921 (1) | (United States) Jake Magin (United States) Eddy Madden | (United States) Alfred Hill (United States) Ernest Kockler | (Germany) Willy Lorenz (United States) Fred Weber |
| 1921 (2) | (United States) Jake Magin (United States) Eddy Madden | (United States) Bob Fitzimmons (Australia) Harry Horan | (United States) Ray Eaton (United States) Harry Kaiser |
| 1922 (1) | (Australia) Alfred Goullet (United States) Ernest Kockler | (United States) Willy Coburn (United States) Dave Lands | (United States) William Hanley (United States) Lloyd Thomas |
| 1922 (2) | (United States) Willy Coburn (United States) Dave Lands | (United States) Percy Lawrence (United States) Lloyd Thomas | (Belgium) Cesar Debaets (Belgium) Alois Persyn |
| 1923 (1) | (Switzerland) Oscar Egg (France) Maurice Brocco | (Australia) Alfred Goullet (United States) Bob Walthour | (Australia) Harry Horan (United States) Lloyd Thomas |
| 1923 (2) | (United States) Carl Stockholm (United States) Ernest Kockler | (United States) Willy Coburn (France) Maurice Brocco | (United States) Percy Lawrence (United States) Joe Kopsky |
| 1924 (1) | (Switzerland) Oscar Egg (Australia) Alfred Grenda | (United States) Carl Stockholm (United States) Ernest Kockler | (Belgium) Maurice Declerck (United States) Eddy Madden |
| 1924 (2) | (Australia) Harry Horan (United States) Bob Walthour | (Belgium) Maurice Declerck (Australia) Alfred Taylor | (Belgium) Henri Stockelynck (Italy) Franco Giorgetti |
| 1925 (1) | (Australia) Reginald McNamara (United States) Bob Walthour | (Belgium) Henri Stockelynck (Belgium) Alfons Goossens | (Australia) Harry Horan (United States) Eddy Madden |
| 1925 (2) | (United States) Fred Spencer (United States) Bob Walthour | (Australia) Harry Horan (Australia) Harris Horder | (Australia) Reginald McNamara (Belgium) Alfons Goossens |
| 1926 (1) | (Australia) Reginald McNamara (United States) Bob Walthour | (United States) Fred Spencer (Italy) Franco Giorgetti | (Belgium) Henri Stockelynck (Belgium) Alfons Goossens |
| 1926 (2) | (United States) Dave Lands (Germany) Otto Petri | (United States) Anthony Beckman (United States) Charles Winter | (Australia) Reginald McNamara (Belgium) Alfons Goossens |
| 1927 (1) | (United States) Carl Stockholm (Italy) Franco Giorgetti | (United States) Fred Spencer (United States) Charles Winter | (Australia) Harry Horan (United States) Eddy Madden |
| 1927 (2) | (United States) Bob Walthour (Italy) Franco Giorgetti | (Netherlands) Klaas van Nek (Belgium) Alfons Goossens | (United States) Carl Stockholm (United States) Fred Spencer |
| 1928 (1) | (United States) Anthony Beckman (Belgium) Gerard Debaets | (United States) Fred Spencer (United States) Bob Walthour | (Netherlands) Klaas van Nek (United States) Dave Lands |
| 1928 (2) | (Netherlands) Piet van Kempen (United States) Mike Rodak | (United States) William Fenn Jr (United States) Bob Walthour | (Australia) George Dempsey (Belgium) Gerard Debaets |
| 1928 (3) | (Germany) Franz Duelberg (United States) Jimmy Walthour | (France) Paul Broccardo (France) Alfred Letourneur | (United States) Anthony Beckman (Italy) Franco Giorgetti |
| 1929 (1) | (Germany) Franz Duelberg (Italy) Franco Giorgetti | (France) Paul Broccardo (France) Alfred Letourneur | (United States) Willie Grimm (United States) Dave Lands |
| 1929 (2) | (Australia) Reginald McNamara (Italy) Gaetano Belloni | (France) Paul Broccardo (France) Alfred Letourneur | (Germany) Franz Duelberg (Germany) Viktor Rausch |
| 1930 (1) | (United States) Anthony Beckman (Belgium) Gerard Debaets | (France) Paul Broccardo (Italy) Alfonso Zucchetti | (United States) Fred Spencer (United States) Charles Winter |
| 1930 (2) | (France) Marcel Guimbretiere (France) Alfred Letourneur | (France) Paul Broccardo (Italy) Franco Giorgetti | (France) Adolphe Charlier (Belgium) Roger De Neef |
| 1931 (1) | (United States) Willie Grimm (Switzerland) Emil Richli | (France) Marcel Guimbretiere (France) Alfred Letourneur | (Australia) Reginald McNamara (United States) Charles Winter |
| 1931 (2) | (Germany) Franz Duelberg (United States) Willie Grimm | (France) Marcel Guimbretiere (France) Alfred Letourneur | (Italy) Franco Giorgetti (Belgium) Gerard Debaets |
| 1932 (1) | (Netherlands) Jan Pijnenburg (Belgium) Adolphe Van Nevele | (France) Marcel Guimbretiere (France) Alfred Letourneur | (Australia) Reginald McNamara (Australia) Harry Horan |
| 1932 (2) | (Canada) Jules Audy (Canada) William Peden | (Italy) Alfredo Binda (United States) Norman Hill | (Belgium) Gerard Debaets (France) Alfred Letourneur |
| 1933 (1) | (Belgium) Gerard Debaets (France) Alfred Letourneur | (Canada) Jules Audy (United States) Willie Grimm | (Canada) Henri Lepage (Belgium) Prudent Delille |
| 1933 (2) | (Germany) Ewald Wissel (United States) Jimmy Walthour | (France) Alfred Letourneur (Canada) William Peden | (Australia) George Dempsey (United States) Robert Thomas |
| 1934 (1) | (United States) Tony Shaller (Canada) William Peden | (United States) Tino Reboli (Italy) Edoardo Severgnini | (Australia) Reginald McNamara (United States) Dave Lands |
| 1934 (2) | (Belgium) Gerard Debaets (France) Alfred Letourneur | (United States) Jack Schaller (United States) Robert Thomas | (United States) Jerry Rodman (United States) Cecil Yates |
| 1935 (1) | (Italy) Franco Giorgetti (France) Alfred Letourneur | (United States) Tino Reboli (United States) Robert Thomas | (Switzerland) Ernst Bühler (United States) Tony Shaller |
| 1935 (2) | (Germany) Gustav Kilian (Germany) Heinz Vopel | (United States) Jerry Rodman (United States) Alfred Hill | (Canada) Jules Audy (Canada) William Peden |
| 1936 (1) | (Germany) Gustav Kilian (Germany) Heinz Vopel | (Canada) Jules Audy (Canada) William Peden | (United States) Jerry Rodman (United States) Robert Thomas |
| 1936 (2) | (France) Emile Diot (France) Emile Ignat | (Germany) Gustav Kilian (Germany) Heinz Vopel | (United States) Jerry Rodman (United States) Cecil Yates |
| 1937 (1) | (France) Emile Diot (France) Emile Ignat | (France) Alvaro Giorgetti (Netherlands) Cor Wals | (Canada) Jules Audy (Canada) William Peden |
| 1937 (2) | (Germany) Gustav Kilian (Germany) Heinz Vopel | (France) Emile Diot (France) Emile Ignat | (Canada) Douglas Peden (Canada) William Peden |
| 1938 (1) | (Germany) Gustav Kilian (Germany) Heinz Vopel | (Canada) Douglas Peden (Canada) William Peden | (United States) Tino Reboli (Belgium) Gerard Debaets |
| 1938 (2) | (Belgium) Omer De Bruycker (France) Alfred Letourneur | (Canada) Douglas Peden (Canada) William Peden | (United States) Tino Reboli (Belgium) Gerard Debaets |
| 1938 (3) | (Germany) Gustav Kilian (Germany) Heinz Vopel | (Canada) Douglas Peden (Canada) William Peden | (France) Marcel Guimbretiere (Belgium) Gerard Debaets |
| 1939 (1) | (Germany) Gustav Kilian (United States) Robert Thomas | (Germany) Heinz Vopel (United States) Cecil Yates | (Canada) Douglas Peden (Canada) William Peden |
| 1939 (2) | (Canada) Douglas Peden (Canada) William Peden | (United States) Cecil Yates (United States) Jerry Rodman | (Canada) Jules Audy (Canada) Henry O'Brien |
| 1940 | (United States) Cecil Yates (Canada) William Peden | (Canada) Douglas Peden (United States) Archie Bollaert | (United States) Charles Bergna (United States) Angelo De Bacco |
| 1941 | Not held | | |
| 1942 | (United States) Cecil Yates (Canada) Douglas Peden | (United States) Charles Bergna (United States) Angelo De Bacco | (United States) Charly Yaccino (Canada) William Peden |
| 1943-1945 | Not held | | |
| 1946 | (United States) Erwin Pesek (United States) Tino Reboli | (United States) Michael Abt (Canada) Rene Cyr | (United States) Bill Jacoby (United States) Charly Yaccino |
| 1947 | (United States) Bill Anderson (Australia) Stanley Bransgrove | (United States) Bill Jacoby (France) Alfred Letourneur | (United States) Erwin Pesek (United States) Charly Yaccino |
| 1948 | (Switzerland) Walter Diggelmann (Switzerland) Hugo Koblet | (Belgium) Roger De Corte (Belgium) André Maelbrancke | (United States) Erwin Pesek (United States) Charly Yaccino |
| 1949-1956 | Not held | | |
| 1957 | (Netherlands) Peter Post (Netherlands) Harm Smits | (United States) Erwin Pesek (United States) Ted Ernst | (Italy) Mino De Rossi (United States) Jack Heid |
