= Six Days of Montreal =

Cycling race

Six Days of Maastricht
Race details
- Region: Montreal, Canada
- Local name: Six Jours de Montréal (in French)
- Discipline: Track
- Type: Six-day racing

History
- First edition: 1929
- Editions: 37
- Final edition: 1980
- First winner: Maurice Declerck (BEL); Willy Coburn (USA)
- Most wins: William Peden (CAN) (7 wins)
- Final winner: Willy Debosscher (BEL); Pietro Algeri (ITA)

The Six Days of Montreal was a six-day track cycling race held annually in the Montreal Forum, Canada, from 1929 to 1942 and from 1963 to 1980.

37 editions were organized during these two periods. William Peden holds the record for most victories with 7.

== Winners ==
Year	Winner	Second	Third
1929	(United States) Willy Coburn (Belgium) Maurice Declerck	(United States) William Coles (Canada) William Peden	(United States) Earl Best (United States) Albert Crossley
1930 (1)	(Canada) Joe Laporte (Netherlands) Piet van Kempen	(Canada) Lew Elder (Canada) William Peden	(United States) Albert Crossley (Canada) Reginald Fielding
1930 (2)	(Canada) Lew Elder (Australia) Horace Horder	(Canada) Reginald Fielding (Canada) William Peden	(Belgium) Marcel Boogmans (Canada) Laurent Gadou
1931 (1)	(Canada) Henri Lepage (Canada) William Peden	(Canada) Reginald Fielding (United States) Harvey Black	(Australia) George Dempsey (Canada) Laurent Gadou
1931 (2)	(Canada) Henri Lepage (Canada) William Peden	(Canada) Jules Audy (Netherlands) Piet van Kempen	(Australia) Horace Horder (Switzerland) Freddy Zach
1932 (1)	(Canada) Jules Audy (Canada) William Peden	(Canada) Henri Lepage (France) Alfred Letourneur	(Canada) Reginald Fielding (United States) Xavier Van Slembroeck
1932 (2)	(Canada) Reginald Fielding (Canada) William Peden	(Canada) Jules Audy (United States) Albert Crossley	(United States) Dave Lands (Australia) Reginald McNamara
1933 (1)	(Belgium) Gérard Debaets (France) Alfred Letourneur	(Canada) Laurent Gadou (Canada) William Peden	(Germany) Hans Putzfeld (Germany) Bernhard Stubecke
1933 (2)	(United States) Frank Bartell (Canada) Laurent Gadou	(Canada) Jules Audy (Canada) William Peden	(Canada) Henri Lepage (France) Alfred Letourneur
1934 (1)	(Canada) Jules Audy (Canada) William Peden	(Canada) Henri Lepage (France) Alfred Letourneur	(Switzerland) Freddy Zach (Australia) Reginald McNamara
1934 (2)	(Germany) Ernst Müller (United States) Charles Winter	(Canada) Henri Lepage (United States) Jimmy Walthour	(United States) Frank Bartell (Canada) Laurent Gadou
1935 (1)	(Germany) Gustav Kilian (Germany) Heinz Vopel	(Canada) Jules Audy (United States) Jimmy Walthour	(United States) Albert Crossley (Canada) Henri Lepage
1935 (2)	(Germany) Gustav Kilian (Germany) Heinz Vopel	(Canada) Henri Lepage (United States) Jimmy Walthour	(United States) Frank Bartell (United States) Fred Ottevaire
1936 (1)	(Germany) Gustav Kilian (Germany) Heinz Vopel	(Canada) Jules Audy (Canada) Henri Lepage	(United States) Henry O'Brien (Republic of Ireland) Jack Sheehan
1936 (2)	(Canada) Raymond Bedard (United States) Jerry Rodman (Canada) Georges Trepanier	(United States) Oscar Juner (United States) Dave Lands (Canada) Roy McDonald	(United States) Archie Bollaert (Canada) Fernand Pelletier (Canada) Pete Willeskey
1937	(Germany) Gustav Kilian (Germany) Heinz Vopel	(France) Emile Diot (France) Emile Ignat	(Canada) Douglas Peden (Canada) William Peden
1938	(Canada) Douglas Peden (Canada) William Peden	(Germany) Gustav Kilian (Germany) Heinz Vopel	(United States) Albert Crossley (United States) Jimmy Walthour
1939	No edition		
1940	(United States) Angelo De Bacco (United States) Cecil Yates	(Canada) René Cyr (Canada) William Peden	(Canada) Raymond Bedard (United States) Fred Ottevaire
1941	(United States) Angelo De Bacco (Canada) René Cyr	(Canada) Jules Audy (United States) Cecil Yates	(Canada) Douglas Peden (Canada) William Peden
1942	(United States) Charles Bergna (Canada) William Peden	(United States) Angelo De Bacco (Canada) René Cyr	(United States) William Anderson (United States) Bill Logan
1943-1962	No editions		
1963	(Italy) Mino De Rossi (Italy) Ferdinando Terruzzi	(Belgium) Robert Lelangue (Belgium) Emile Severeyns	(Germany) Willi Altig (France) André Darrigade
1964 (1)	(Denmark) Palle Lykke Jensen (Belgium) Emile Severeyns	(Italy) Mino De Rossi (Italy) Ferdinando Terruzzi	(Germany) Klaus Bugdahl (Luxembourg) Lucien Gillen
1964 (2)	(Luxembourg) Lucien Gillen (Belgium) Robert Lelangue	(Italy) Leandro Faggin (Italy) Ferdinando Terruzzi	(Denmark) Palle Lykke Jensen (Belgium) Emile Severeyns
1965 (1)	(Germany) Klaus Bugdahl (Germany) Klemens Grossimlinghaus	(Italy) Giuseppe Beghetto (Italy) Sergio Bianchetto	(Belgium) Romain Deloof (Germany) Horst Oldenburg
1965 (2)	(Denmark) Freddy Eugen (Italy) Leandro Faggin	(Switzerland) Fritz Pfenninger (Germany) Sigi Renz	(Luxembourg) Lucien Gillen (Belgium) Robert Lelangue
1966 (1)	(Denmark) Freddy Eugen (Italy) Leandro Faggin	(Switzerland) Fritz Pfenninger (Germany) Sigi Renz	(Luxembourg) Lucien Gillen (Denmark) Palle Lykke Jensen
1966 (2)	(Denmark) Palle Lykke Jensen (Belgium) Emile Severeyns	(Denmark) Freddy Eugen (Italy) Leandro Faggin	(Germany) Horst Oldenburg (Germany) Dieter Kemper
1967 (1)	(Belgium) Patrick Sercu (Belgium) Emile Severeyns	(Denmark) Palle Lykke Jensen (Denmark) Freddy Eugen	(Switzerland) Fritz Pfenninger (Netherlands) Peter Post
1967 (2)	(Denmark) Palle Lykke Jensen (Denmark) Freddy Eugen	(Switzerland) Fritz Pfenninger (Italy) Leandro Faggin	(Belgium) Patrick Sercu (Belgium) Emile Severeyns
1968 (1)	(Germany) Horst Oldenburg (Italy) Leandro Faggin	(Belgium) Patrick Sercu (Belgium) Emile Severeyns	(Denmark) Palle Lykke Jensen (Denmark) Freddy Eugen
1968 (2)	(Switzerland) Fritz Pfenninger (Switzerland) Louis Pfenninger	(Germany) Klaus Bugdahl (Germany) Wolfgang Schulze	(Denmark) Palle Lykke Jensen (Denmark) Freddy Eugen
1969	(France) Jacky Mourioux (France) Alain Van Lancker	(Belgium) Patrick Sercu (Belgium) Emile Severeyns	(Switzerland) Fritz Pfenninger (Switzerland) Louis Pfenninger
1970	No edition		
1971	(United Kingdom) Tony Gowland (Italy) Gianni Motta	(Belgium) Norbert Seeuws (Belgium) Julien Stevens	(Netherlands) Jan Janssen (Netherlands) Gerard Koel
1972	(Belgium) Norbert Seeuws (Belgium) Julien Stevens	(Netherlands) Jan Janssen (Netherlands) Gerard Koel	(United States) Jackie Simes (United States) John Vande Velde
1973	(Belgium) Ferdinand Bracke (Belgium) Robert Van Lancker	(United States) Jack Simes (United States) John Vande Velde	(Belgium) Norbert Seeuws (Belgium) Julien Stevens
1974-1978	No editions		
1979	(Italy) Pietro Algeri (Belgium) Willy Debosscher	(Netherlands) Gerben Karstens (Netherlands) Martin Venix	(Denmark) Gert Frank (Denmark) Kim Gunnar Svendsen
1980	(Italy) Pietro Algeri (Belgium) Willy Debosscher	(Netherlands) Gerben Karstens (Netherlands) Martin Venix	(Netherlands) Herman Ponsteen (Belgium) Gustaaf Van Roosbroeck
