= Six Days of Toronto =

Track cycling race

Race details
- Region: Toronto, Canada
- Discipline: Track
- Type: Six-day racing

History
- First edition: 1912
- Editions: 11
- Final edition: 1965
- First winner: Paddy Hehir (AUS); Eddy Root (USA)
- Most wins: William Peden (CAN) (4 wins)
- Final winner: Rik van Steenbergen (BEL); Emile Severeyns (BEL)

The Toronto Six Days was a six-day track cycling race held in Toronto, Canada.

Its first edition dates back to 1912. It was held until 1965 with long breaks between editions.

William Peden holds the record of victories, winning 4 times.

== Winners ==
Year	Winner	Second	Third
1912	(Australia) Paddy Hehir (United States) Eddy Root	(United States) Jim Moran (France) André Perchicot	(United States) Worth Mitten (Australia) Fred Wells
1913	(Australia) Alfred Grenda (Australia) Ernie Pye	Unknown	Unknown
1914-1931	No editions		
1932 (may)	(Canada) Reginald Fielding (Canada) William "Torchy" Peden	(Canada) Henri Lepage (France) Alfred Letourneur	(Canada) Jules Audy (United States) Harry Horan
1932 (oct)	(United States) Albert Crossley (Australia) Reginald McNamara	(Canada) Henri Lepage (Germany) Bernhardt Stübecke	(United States) Anthony Beckman (Canada) Laurent Gadou
1933 (may)	(Belgium) Gérard Debaets (France) Alfred Letourneur	(Canada) Jules Audy (Canada) William "Torchy" Peden	(Canada) Reginald Fielding (United States) Harry Horan
1933 (oct)	(Canada) Henri Lepage (France) Alfred Letourneur	(Canada) Jules Audy (Netherlands) Piet van Kempen	(Canada) William "Torchy" Peden (Germany) Ewald Wissel
1934 (may)	(Canada) Jules Audy (Canada) William "Torchy" Peden	(United States) Frank Bartell (United States) Charly Winter	(Canada) Reginald Fielding (Canada) Laurent Gadou
1934 (nov)	(Canada) Reginald Fielding (United States) Fred Ottevaire (United States) Jimmy Walthour	(United Kingdom) Sydney Cozens (United States) Godfrey Parrott (Canada) William "Torchy" Peden	(Netherlands) Joseph Clignet (Netherlands) Ernest Muller (Netherlands) Piet van Kempen
1935 (may)	(United States) Albert Crossley (Canada) William "Torchy" Peden	(Germany) Gustav Kilian (Germany) Heinz Vöpel	(Canada) Reginald Fielding (United States) Fred Ottevaire
1935 (sep)	(United States) Albert Crossley (United States) Jimmy Walthour	(United States) Fred Spencer (Germany) Heinz Vöpel	(United States) Frank Bartell (United States) Fred Ottevaire
1936	(United States) Jimmy Walthour (United States) Charly Winter	(Canada) Jules Audy (Canada) William "Torchy" Peden	(United States) Fred Spencer (Switzerland) Freddy Zach
1937	(Canada) Doug Peden (Canada) William "Torchy" Peden	(Canada) Laurent Gadou (United States) Jimmy Walthour	(United States) Albert Crossley (Canada) Reginald Fielding
1938-1964	No editions		
1965	(Belgium) Emile Severeyns (Belgium) Rik Van Steenbergen	(Italy) Leandro Faggin (Italy) Mino De Rossi	(Luxembourg) Lucien Gillen (Belgium) Robert Lelangue
