= Cecil Yates =

American track cyclist and bicycle racer (1912 – 1987)

Cecil Richard Yates Sr
Personal information
- Full name: Cecil Richard Yates Sr
- Born: May 08, 1912 Thurber, Texas
- Died: March 1987 (aged 74) Buckeye, Arizona
- Height: 5 ft 4 in (163 cm)

Cycling career
- Sport: Cycling
- Discipline: Track
- Role: Rider
- Rider type: Sprinter

Cecil Richard Yates Sr (May 8, 1912 – March 27, 1987) was an American professional track cyclist. He is best known for his success in six-day racing, having 18 victories in his career and being described as a strong sprinter.

During World War II, Yates served the Army Air Force for 34 months, being promoted up to a Sergeant. He retired from cycling in 1950, winning 18 of 56 total six-day races he entered. He was inducted into the United States Bicycling Hall of Fame in 2007.

== Six-day wins ==
1934
Six Days of Vancouver (with Eddie Testa)
1935
Six Days of Detroit (with Robert Vermeersch)
Six Days of Louisville (with Jack Gabell)
1936
Six Days of San Francisco (with Henry O'Brien)
Six Days of Des Moines (with Freddy Zach)
1937
Six Days of San Francisco (with Jerry Rodman)
Six Days of Oakland (with George Dempsey)
1939
Six Days of Buffalo (with Gustav Kilian)
Six Days of New York (with Cesare Moretti Jr.)
Six Days of Buffalo (with Heinz Vopel)
1940
Six Days of Chicago (with William Peden)
1941
Six Days of Montreal (with Angelo de Bacco)
1942
Six Days of Milwaukee (with Jules Audy)
Six Days of Chicago (with William Peden)
1948
Six Days of Winnipeg (with Charles Bergna)
1949
Six Days of Cleveland (with Charles Bergna)
