= Gerard Debaets =

Belgian cyclist

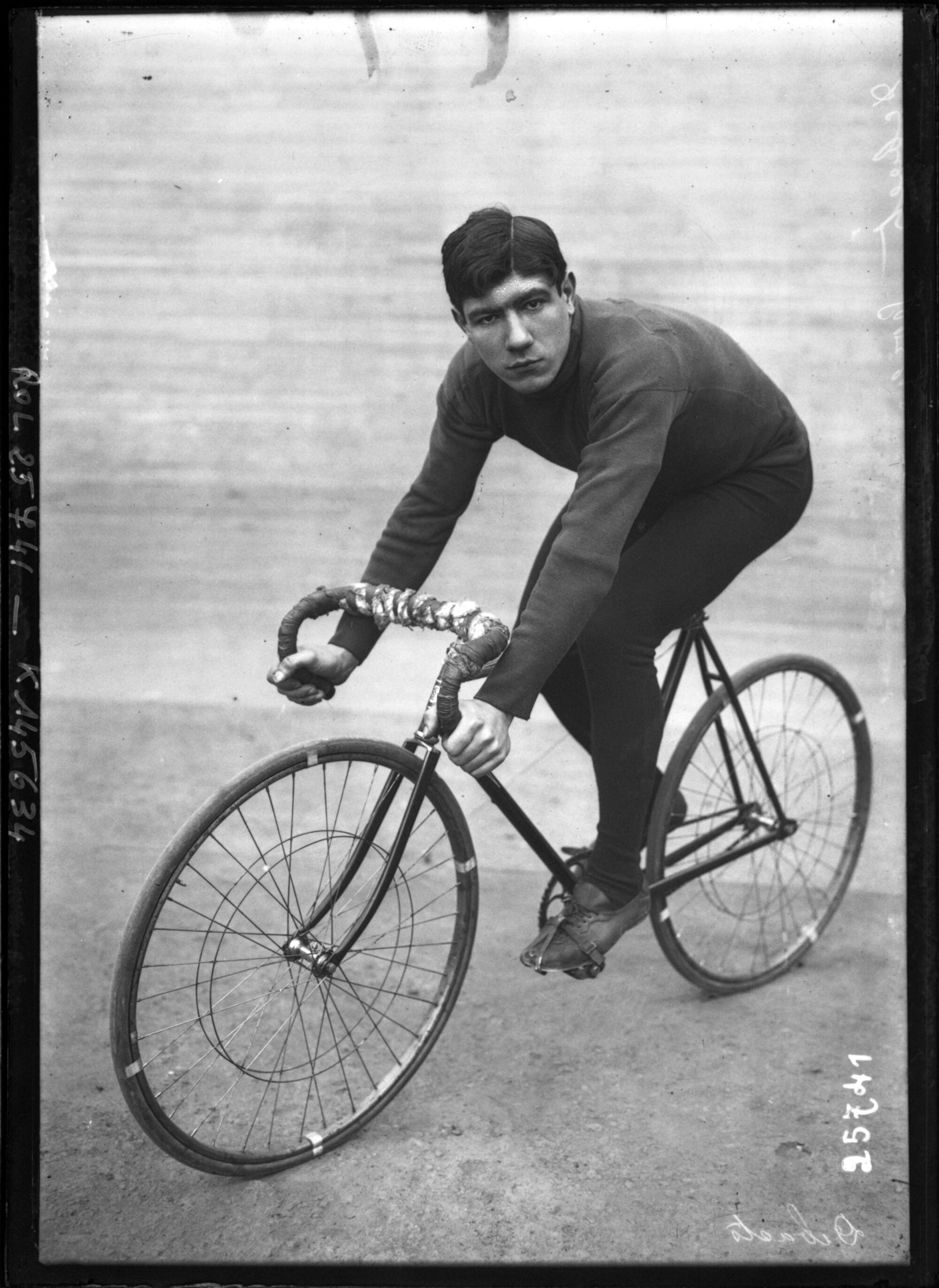

Personal information
- Born: 17 April 1898 Heule, Belgium
- Died: 27 April 1959 (aged 60) North Haledon, New Jersey, United States

Cycling career
- Sport: Cycling
- Role: Rider

Professional teams
- 1924: Labor-Dunlop
- 1925: Individual
- 1926: Alcyon-Dunlop
- 1927: Opel-ZR III / JB Louvet-Wolber
- 1928: Alcyon-Dunlop
- 1929-40: Individual

Major wins
- One-day races and Classics National Road Race Championship (1925) Tour of Flanders (1924, 1927) Paris–Brussels (1925) Track Championships US National Track Championships Derny (1924)

Gerard Debaets (17 April 1898 – 27 April 1959) was a Belgian racing cyclist. He won the Tour of Flanders in 1924 and 1927 and the Belgian national road race title in 1925. He also specialized in track cycling, winning a total of 18 six-day events, including six times the most prestigious Six Days of New York. Debaets was a resident of Fair Lawn and North Haledon, New Jersey, where he died in 1959 of a heart attack.

== Major results ==
=== Road ===
1923
1st Tour of Flanders independents
1924
1st Tour of Flanders
1st París-Arrás Tour
1st Overall Critérium des Aiglons

1st Stages 1 & 2

2nd Paris–Brussels
2nd Jemeppe–Bastogne–Jemeppe
4th Overall Tour of Belgium
8th Scheldeprijs
10th Paris–Roubaix
1925
1st Road race, National Interclubs Championships
1st Paris–Brussels
2nd Bordeaux–Paris
3rd Sclessin–Houffalize–Sclessin
4th Giro della Provincia di Milano
5th GP Wolber
6th Paris–Roubaix
1926
1st Brussels–Paris
8th Overall Tour of the Basque Country
1927
1st Tour of Flanders
2nd Hannover–Bremen–Hannover
3rd Sclessin–Houffalize–Sclessin
1928
2nd Criterium des As

=== Track ===
1924
1st United States National Track Championships Derny
1925
1st Six Days of New York-2 (with Alfons Goossens)
1927
1st Six Days of Detroit (with Anthony Beckman)
1928
1st Six Days of New York-1 (with Franco Giorgetti)
1st Six Days of Chicago-1 (with Anthony Beckman)
3rd Six Days of Chicago-3 (with George Dempsey)
1929
1st Six Days of New York-2 (with Franco Giorgetti)
1st Six Days of New York-3 (with Franco Giorgetti)
1930
1st Six Days of New York-1 (with Gaetano Belloni)
1st Six Days of Chicago-1 (with Anthony Beckman)
1931
3rd Six Days of New York-2 (with Franco Giorgetti)
3rd Six Days of Chicago-2 (with Franco Giorgetti)
1932
3rd Six Days of Chicago-2 (with Alfred Letourneur)
3rd Six Days of Philadelphia-2 (with Alfred Letourneur)
1933
1st Six Days of Chicago-1 (with Alfred Letourneur)
1934
1st Six Days of New York-2 (with Alfred Letourneur)
1st Six Days of Chicago-2 (with Alfred Letourneur)
1st Six Days of Buffalo-2 (with Alfred Letourneur)
1st Six Days of Philadelphia (with Alfred Letourneur)
1st Six Days of Montreal (with Alfred Letourneur)
1st Six Days of Toronto-1 (with Alfred Letourneur)
1935
2nd Six Days of New York-1 (with Ewald Wissel)
1936
3rd Six Days of New York-2 (with Alvaro Giorgetti)
1937
3rd Six Days of Buffalo-2 (with Tino Reboli)
1938
3rd Six Days of Chicago-1 (with Tino Reboli)
3rd Six Days of Chicago-2 (with Tino Reboli)
3rd Six Days of Chicago-3 (with Marcel Guimbretiere)
