= Six Days of Buffalo =

Former cycling event in Buffalo, New York

Race details
- Region: Buffalo, New York, United States
- Discipline: Track
- Type: Six-day racing

History
- First edition: 1910
- Editions: 16
- Final edition: 1948
- First winner: Peter Drobach (USA) Alfred Hill (USA)
- Most wins: Gustav Kilian (GER) (4 wins)
- Final winner: César Moretti Jr. (ITA) René Cyr (CAN)

The Six Days of Buffalo was a six-day cycling event, held in Buffalo, New York. From 1910 to 1948, a total of sixteen editions of the Six Days were held, sometimes two per year.

Originally held at Broadway Auditorium, the events moved to Buffalo Memorial Auditorium beginning in 1941.

== Roll of honor ==
Edition	Winners
1910	Peter Drobach (USA); Alfred Hill (USA)
1911	Jack Clark (AUS); Ernie Pye (AUS)
1912	Not held
1913	Peter Drobach (USA); Paddy Hehir (AUS)
1914	Not held
1915	Reggie McNamara (AUS); Francesco Verri (ITA)
1916–33	Not held
1934 (1)	William Peden (CAN); Fred Ottevaire (USA)
1934 (2)	Gérald Debaetes (BEL); Alfred Letourneur (FRA)
1935 (1)	Franco Giorgetti (ITA); Alfred Letourneur (FRA)
1935 (2)	Louis Cohen (USA); Dave Lands (USA)
1936	Not held
1937 (1)	William Peden (CAN); Doug Peden (CAN)
1937 (2)	Gustav Kilian; Heinz Vöpel
1938 (1)	Omer De Bruycker (BEL); Alfred Letourneur (FRA)
1938 (2)	Gustav Kilian; Bobby Thomas (USA)
1939	Gustav Kilian; Cecil Yates (USA)
1940	Heinz Vöpel; Cecil Yates (USA)
1941	Gustav Kilian; Heinz Vöpel
1942–47	Not held
1948	César Moretti Jr. (ITA); René Cyr (CAN)
