= 1927 Tour of Flanders =

Race details
- Dates: April 3, 1927
- Stages: 1
- Distance: 217 km (134.8 mi)
- Winning time: 7h 12' 30"

Results
| | Winner | Gerard Debaets (BEL) |
| | Second | Gustaaf Van Slembrouck (BEL) |
| | Third | Maurice De Waele (BEL) |

The 11th edition of the Tour of Flanders cycling classic race was held on Sunday, 3 April 1927. Belgian Gerard Debaets won the Monument for a second time after his 1924 victory. Of the 96 starting cyclists, 41 reached the finish.

== Route ==
The race had Ghent as both start and finish place and covered 217 km.

The course featured 2 categorized climbs:

- Tiegemberg
- Kwaremont

== Race report ==
The final winner was the Belgian rider Gerard Debaets, who won solo in Ghent. The Belgians Gustave Van Slembrouck and Maurice De Waele completed the podium. Debaets completed the race with an average of 30.827 km/h.

== General classification ==
=== Final general classification ===
| Rank | Rider | Team | Time |
|---|---|---|---|
| 1 | Gerard Debaets (BEL) | J.B.Louvet | 7h 12' 30" |
| 2 | Gustaaf Van Slembrouck (BEL) | J.B.Louvet | + 1' 35" |
| 3 | Maurice De Waele (BEL) | Wonder | + 2' 20" |
| 4 | Leo Degraveleyn (BEL) | La Française | s.t. |
| 5 | Julien Vervaecke (BEL) | Peugeot–Dunlop | s.t. |
| 6 | Gaston Rebry (BEL) | Peugeot–Dunlop | s.t. |
| 7 | Maurice Depauw (BEL) | Thomann–Dunlop | + 5' 55" |
| 8 | Henri Hoevenaars (BEL) | Automoto | + 7' 30" |
| 9 | Georges Ronsse (BEL) | Automoto | + 7' 40" |
| 10 | Leander Gijssels (BEL) | Griffon | + 7' 50" |
