= Six Days of London =

Six Day London
Race details
- Date: 22-27 October 2019
- Region: London, United Kingdom
- Discipline: Track
- Type: Six-day racing
- Organiser: Madison Sports Group
- Web site: sixday.com

History
- First edition: 1923
- Editions: 25 (as of 2018)
- First winner: Aloïs Persijn (BEL); Pierre Vandevelde (BEL)
- Most wins: Patrick Sercu (BEL) (8 wins)
- Most recent: Elia Viviani (ITA); Simone Consonni (ITA)

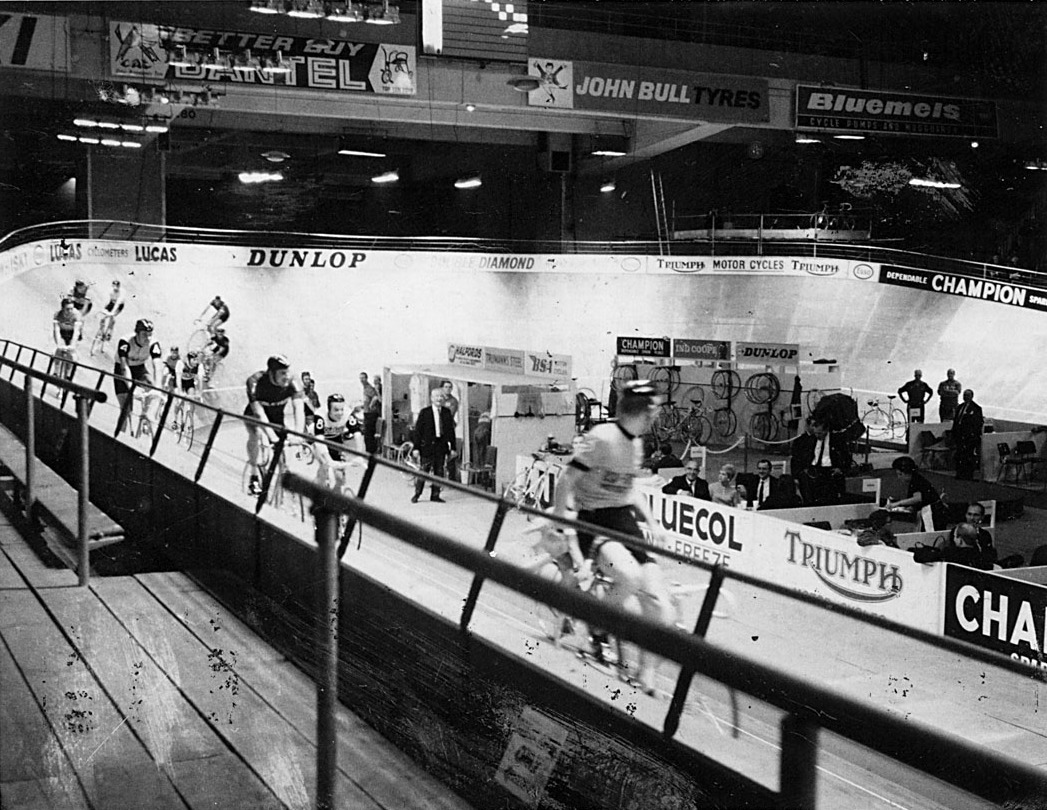
The 1967 edition held at the Earls Court Exhibition Centre

The Six Day London is a six-day track cycling race held annually in London, United Kingdom. The competition consists of six consecutive evening sessions of track cycling: Madison, Sprint, Elimination, Keirin, Derny and Team Time Trial disciplines. Six day invites the world's elite Men's and Women's riders, as well as sprinters and emerging talent from around the world. The overall winner is the team which takes the most laps.

Laps are primarily "taken" through the Madison and Points Race events. However, teams also race to accumulate points in the other disciplines, such as the Elimination, Team Time Trial and Derny events. The collection of points is vital as it can help establish an overall leader, should teams find themselves with the same number of laps. (See Outline of the Event)

Six Day Cycling is best known for its signature event, the Madison (named after Madison Square Garden in New York City, where the two-man format was devised), where both riders may be on the track at the same time, taking turns to race and hand-slinging each other back into action. Six Day events also offer a unique party like atmosphere, providing dance music as a backdrop to the drama on the track.

Six Day Cycling originated in Britain in 1877, where its popularity spread to many regions of the world and there are now seven events held globally. Initially, individuals competed alone with the winner being the individual who completed the most laps over six days. However, this format was changed in the early 20th century to teams of two so one rider could race while the other rested, in order to keep the race continually going. Today, the 24-hours-a-day regime has been abandoned, with the Six Day format involving six nights of racing, typically from 6pm to 2am, on indoor tracks (velodromes).

== Origins ==
Like most sporting events, Six Day racing began with a wager. The first six-day event was an individual time trial at the Agricultural Hall in Islington, London in 1878 when David Stanton, a cycling professional, sought a bet that he could ride 1,000 miles on his penny-farthing in six successive days, riding 18 hours a day. This challenge was picked up and backed by the Sporting Life newspaper who set a prize of £100 if Stanton could successfully complete the challenge. In February that year, Stanton started at 6am on 25 February and handsomely won the bet, completing the distance in less than five days.

Inspired by the publicity surrounding Stanton’s feat, a following Six Day race was hurriedly organised at the same venue, this time for a mass field and with £150 offered in total prize money - £100 going to the victor. 12 men entered, including John ‘happy Jack’ Keen reputedly the fastest rider in the world, French champion Charles Terront and W. Philips the champion of Wales. The race started at 6am with only four of the 12 entrants on the track. Although it is often said that the first six-day was a non-stop, no-sleeping event that ran without pause for six days, in fact riders joined in when they chose and slept as they wished. After six days and nights of riding Yorkshireman, Bill Cann, walked away the victor of the world’s very first competitive Six day race.

As Six Day Cycling grew in popularity, women became involved and it was at the first recorded London race where racing was a full 12 days of competition, held at the Royal Aquarium, Westminster. Within a few years those pioneer riders, both men and women, had carried the sport across the Atlantic to America when in 1891 the first Six Days of New York were held in New York's Madison Square Garden. Initially, these races were contests of raw endurance, with a single rider completing as many laps as possible. At first, races were less than 24 hours a day. Riders slept at night and were free to join in the morning when they chose. Faster riders would start later than the slower ones, who would sacrifice sleep to make up for lack of pace. Originally riders were allowed to rest half the day, but promoters realised that teams of two, with only one rider on the track at a time, would give each the 12 hours' rest the law intended while making the race still last 24 hours. Interestingly, races lasted six days rather than a week to avoid racing on Sunday.

By the 1920s Six Day Cycling had become a huge hit in America, becoming the country’s most popular sport in the ‘jazz age’ – far bigger than baseball. Lining the track were stars such as Knute Rockne, George Raft, Barbara Stanwyck, Otto Kruger and Bing Crosby, who would not only find musical scores, but would also pay the hospital bills of riders who fell. Even villainous gangster Al Capone was said to have appeared at the event. Unfortunately Six Day racing faded in America as a result of World War II, the great depression, motor racing and the influx of foreign riders who upstaged the home riders, thus reducing spectator interest.

== European popularity ==
Europe had witnessed the success of Madison’s in America and Six day cycling quickly became popular. The cycling powerhouses of Germany, France and Italy embraced the battle on the boards with open arms as summer road racing stars turned their gaze on Six day racing to fill the winter coffers – a tradition that continues to this day. The first Six day event was in Toulouse in 1906, although it was abandoned after three days because of lack of interest. Berlin held an event three years later, with success. Five races were held in Germany in 1911–12, Brussels in 1912 and Paris in 1913.

Six-day races continued to do well in Europe, but especially in Germany - except during the Nazi period when the races were banned, but was also hugely popular in Belgium and France. London saw one race at Olympia in July 1923, and then a series of races at Wembley starting in 1936. The local man, Frank Southall, crashed and left for hospital. So did another British hope, Syd Cozens. Only nine of the 15 teams lasted the race. The series continued, with more success, until the start of the second world war in 1939.

Racing began hesitantly after 1945. The first in Germany for 17 years were in 1950 with two further races being held at Wembley in 1951 and 1952. Eventually though, European races began to decline. Races continued through the night, as they had in the US, but the costs of keeping stadiums open for partygoers who'd missed the bus and a small number of dedicated fans was too great.

London dropped night racing when it revived Six Day racing in 1967 at Earls Court and the following year at Wembley a new organiser, former rider Ron Webb, scheduled just the afternoon and evening with a break between sessions. Other organisers were not impressed and insisted Webb call his race a "six" and not a "six-day". One by one, however, they followed Webb's pattern and there are now no old-style 24-hour races left. The last was Madrid whilst The London Six at Wembley continued annually until 1980.

== Reinventing Six Day Cycling ==
Founded in 2013, Madison Sports Group, a promoter of cycling events, decided in 2015 to reinvigorate the competition through the introduction of new Six Day Cycling events in six major cities across the globe, which together form the ‘Six Day Series’. The series starts in London travelling across the world, where it touches down in Berlin, Copenhagen, Melbourne and Manchester, before concluding in Brisbane. Although the Six Day Series is their flagship concept, MSG have previously promoted the Rotterdam, Amsterdam and Mallorca Six Day events and are unveiling Six Day Hong Kong in March 2019

== 6 Day Cycling and London ==
In the 1920s and 30s, the London Six was held at Wembley (where the arena is now) and people would be locked out as crowds swelled. Other cities such as Paris and Berlin followed suit and there was a vibrant scene across Europe, well attended and with the bands playing.

By the 1940s, there was an understandable hiatus of events as the shadow of war cast across the continent. However, by the 1950s and 60s events had started reappearing and the scene was once again thriving. Wembley and Earls Court would host Six Day events in London. Cycling stars such as Eddy Merckx would race on the road during the summer and then earn prize money in the off-season by touring the tracks of Europe, where he was often found sleeping at the track, ready to compete during the day and late into the night. By the start of the 21st century, events and crowds were dwindling. In the UK, there hadn't been a Six Day since 1980 and riders such as Sir Bradley Wiggins and Mark Cavendish who were schooled in the world of Six Day (Wiggins’ father was a regular on the circuit) were specialising more on the road.

In 2015, with the London 2012 Olympic Games still fresh in the memory Madison Sports Group brought Six day Cycling back to London with the event being hosted at the Lee Valley Velodrome, which had been built as part of the Olympic legacy. Sir Bradley Wiggins chose the 2016 London event as his last UK track appearance and riders like the Australian Olympic gold medallists Cameron Mayer and Callum Scotson have also featured.

The women’s event has also grown with the opportunity to compete in the Madison, an added attraction for exponents of track racing. Two time world champion Kirsten Wild has attended in previous years, whilst Six Day Manchester 2019 will see Britain’s track cyclist Laura Kenny compete. Kenny will also be joined by Six Day London 2017 and Olympic team Pursuit champion Katie Archibald and fellow British Cycling teammate Elinor Barker, an Olympic, two-time world and four-time European champion.

== Outline of the Event ==
The Men’s racing is broken into two separate competitions: The Elite Men’s (riders compete for the Six Day title) and The Sprinters competition.

=== The Elite Men’s competition ===
- Teams of two riders race over six consecutive evenings
- Each evening, there are multiple races across a variety of sprint and endurance disciplines
- In some disciplines, it is possible for teams to lap the field. This is known as ‘taking a lap’. Taking laps lifts a team up the overall standings.
- As well as trying to take laps, teams also race to accumulate points in each discipline. These are vital to establish the overall lead, known as the ‘general classification ‘. The team that has taken the most laps on the rest of the field will lead the general classification, but should teams find themselves on the same number of laps then the number of points will decide who wins.

For the Elite Men, teams compete in four events as outlined below:

- The Madison – This race is the quintessential ‘Six Day’ event. With the Madison now part of the Olympic Games programme, both men and women will have Madison races in the Six Day Series. Riding in pairs, each team member takes turns to race, bringing his or her partner into the race with a ‘hand-sling’. Highly tactical, Six Day Madison races still concentrate on ‘taking a lap’ which is the traditional format and can lead to hugely tactical, as well as explosive racing. Throughout a Six Day event there are differing versions of the race, including a 45-minute chase, a 500m Time Trial and the Madison Finale which can often decide the entire event.
- Team Elimination - Unlike most races, the action tends to take place at the back of the pack in the elimination. Every two laps the rider at the back of the race is eliminated – all the way through until there are only two riders left, who sprint it out for the win. It's not possible to take a lap in an elimination race and instead riders battle it out for points.
- Derny – The Derny involves eight riders and eight Derny (motorbike) pacers. The pacer/rider combination is done by drawing names from a hat pre-race. In the Derny race, a rider from each team lines up behind a motorised pacer that can go up to speeds of 70 km/h, creating a slipstream for the rider behind. For the heats, the race takes place over 40 laps where the winner is the rider who is first to complete the set number of laps. For the finals it's over 60 laps and the riders compete as teams. Halfway through the race a second rider from each team will be hand-slung into the race by their partner behind the Derny and then the second rider completes the race. Again, first past the line wins and it's 20 points for the winner.
- Points Race –takes place over 30 laps. Like the Madison, riders can take laps on their opponents- but this time acquires points. Lap the field and it's 20 points. Lose a lap and you lose 20 points. Every five laps, the bell rings signalling that there is a sprint competition for one lap. The winner of that sprint gets five points, second gets three points, third two points and fourth wins one point.

=== Sprinters ===
As well as the Elite Men’s racing, Six Day also features a competition for sprinters which is also raced over the six evenings. Sprinters compete in three disciplines, where the points accumulated determine an overall winner. These events are:

- 200m Flying Time Trial – Sprinters have three laps to circle the track, where on the last lap their fastest time is recorded.
- Sprint Competition – Depending on the results in the time trial, racers will be paired up against each other. Although labelled a ‘sprint’ and lasting only three laps, in the early part of the contest you can expect to see riders slowly circle the track in a game of 'cat and mouse', each trying to out-position their rival in order to launch a surprise dash for the line. The race often comes down to the last 50m but you may see some riders choosing to go early.
- Keirin – Originated in Japan, where it is hugely popular. For the opening laps the riders must stay behind the motorbike (the Derny) which paces the riders with increasing speed. Positioning behind the Derny is paramount and riders will try to jostle each other out of position to get an advantage over their rivals. With 2.5 laps to go the Derny exits the track and the race is on.

=== The Six Day Series Women’s Event ===
Within the Women’s event are two categories: The Elite Women’s and The UCI Women’s Omnium. The Elite Women’s competition consists of three events as outlined below:

- Scratch Race – The race takes place over 40 laps and the winner is the rider crossing the line first. Riders compete by taking laps from their opponents instead of first to finish the 40 laps.
- Elimination Race – Same as the Men’s Elimination race
- 20 km Madison – Is the same as the men’s event, however is 80 laps with sprint intervals of 10 laps.

The winning team is the one with the most points and this is important for the riders, as the race carries UCI International Rider Ranking Points

=== UCI Women’s Omnium ===
Since the start of the 2017 season Six Day now hosts a full UCI Omnium for the Women. This consists of four events:

- 7.5 km Scratch Race – Same as Scratch race, however only 30 laps.
- 7.5 km Tempo Race – After four laps of racing, the bell will ring on every lap with the first rider passing the line on each lap receiving a point. Should a rider take a lap she will receive 20 points and whose who lose a lap will be deducted 20 points.
- Elimination Race – Similar to Team Elimination – but riders compete as individuals. After two laps of the race, the bell rings and the last rider across the line on the following lap is eliminated and has to leave the track. This happens every other lap and the final two riders sprint for the win. For this race the points system is as follows:
  - 1st – 40 points
  - 2nd - 38 points
  - 3rd - 36 points
  - 4th – 34 points

20 km Points Race – Takes place over 80 laps with 20 points to be won every time a rider laps an opponent and 20 points to be lost if lapped. The race also includes a sprint race every 10 laps five points for the winner, second gets three points, third receives two points and the fourth only one point – The Winner of the race is the rider with the highest points total.

== Palmarès ==
Years	Winners	Second	Third
1903	Tommy Hall (GBR); Martin (GBR)	T. Webber (GBR); Gilbert (GBR)	Charley Barden (GBR); Anteo Carapezzi (ITA)
1923	Aloïs Persijn (BEL); Pierre Vandevelde (BEL)	Marcel Godivier (FRA); Georges Peyrode (FRA)	Marcel Dupuy (FRA); Giuseppe Oliveri (ITA)
1924–1933	Not raced		
1934	Sydney Cozens (GBR); Piet van Kempen (NED)	Gustav Kilian (GER); Heinz Vopel (GER)	Fred Ottevaire (USA); Charles Winter (USA)
1935	Not raced		
1936	Gustav Kilian (GER); Heinz Vopel (GER)	Jean Aerts (BEL); Albert Buysse (BEL)	Emile Diot (FRA); Emile Ignat (FRA)
1937	Piet van Kempen (NED); Albert Buysse (BEL)	Emile Diot (FRA); Emile Ignat (FRA)	Alfred Crossley (USA); Jimmy Walthour (USA)
1938	Albert Billiet (BEL); Albert Buysse (BEL)	Kees Pellenaars (NED); Frans Slaats (NED)	Piet van Kempen (NED); Cor Wals (NED)
1939	Omer De Bruycker (BEL); Karel Kaers (BEL)	Arie Van Vliet (NED); Cor Wals (NED)	Albert Billiet (BEL); Albert Buysse (BEL)
1940–1950	Not raced		
1951	René Adriaenssens (BEL); Albert Bruylandt (BEL)	Reginald Arnold (AUS); Alfred Strom (AUS)	Severino Rigoni (ITA); Ferdinando Terruzzi (ITA)
1952	Reginald Arnold (AUS); Alfred Strom (AUS)	Severino Rigoni (ITA); Ferdinando Terruzzi (ITA)	Armin von Büren (SUI); Jean Roth (SUI)
1953–1966	Not raced		
1967	Freddy Eugen (DEN); Palle Lykke Jensen (DEN)	Dieter Kemper (FRG); Horst Oldenburg (FRG)	Gerard Koel (NED); Peter Post (NED)
1968	Patrick Sercu (BEL); Peter Post (NED)	Dieter Kemper (FRG); Horst Oldenburg (FRG)	Giuseppe Beghetto (ITA); Klaus Bugdahl (FRG)
1969	Patrick Sercu (BEL); Peter Post (NED)	Dieter Kemper (FRG); Klaus Bugdahl (FRG)	Graeme Gilmore (AUS); William Lawrie (AUS)
1970	Patrick Sercu (BEL); Peter Post (NED)	Sigi Renz (FRG); Tony Gowland (GBR)	Dieter Kemper (FRG); Klaus Bugdahl (FRG)
1971	Patrick Sercu (BEL); Peter Post (NED)	Alain Van Lancker (FRA); Tony Gowland (GBR)	Fritz Pfenninger (SUI); Erich Spahn (SUI)
1972	Patrick Sercu (BEL); Tony Gowland (GBR)	Leo Duyndam (NED); Gerben Karstens (NED)	Alain Van Lancker (FRA); Jacky Mourioux (FRA)
1973	Leo Duyndam (NED); Gerben Karstens (NED)	Patrick Sercu (BEL); Gianni Motta (ITA)	Alain Van Lancker (FRA); Jacky Mourioux (FRA)
1974	Patrick Sercu (BEL); René Pijnen (NED)	Leo Duyndam (NED); Roy Schuiten (NED)	Sigi Renz (FRG); Tony Gowland (GBR)
1975	Günther Haritz (FRG); René Pijnen (NED)	Wilfried Peffgen (FRG); Tony Gowland (GBR)	Patrick Sercu (BEL); Alain Van Lancker (FRA)
1976	Not raced		
1977	Patrick Sercu (BEL); René Pijnen (NED)	Donald Allan (AUS); Danny Clark (AUS)	Wilfried Peffgen (FRG); Albert Fritz (FRG)
1978	Donald Allan (AUS); Danny Clark (AUS)	Gerrie Knetemann (NED); Jan Raas (NED)	Wilfried Peffgen (FRG); Albert Fritz (FRG)
1979	Patrick Sercu (BEL); Albert Fritz (FRG)	Gerben Karstens (NED); René Pijnen (NED)	Gert Frank (DEN); René Savary (SUI)
1980	Donald Allan (AUS); Danny Clark (AUS)	Gert Frank (DEN); Kim Gunnar Svendsen (DEN)	Patrick Sercu (BEL); Albert Fritz (FRG)
1981–2014	Not raced		
2015	Kenny De Ketele (BEL); Moreno De Pauw (BEL)	Christopher Latham (GBR); Oliver Wood (GBR)	Iljo Keisse (BEL); Gijs Van Hoecke (BEL)
2016	Kenny De Ketele (BEL); Moreno De Pauw (BEL)	Mark Cavendish (GBR); Bradley Wiggins (GBR)	Cameron Meyer (AUS); Callum Scotson (AUS)
2017	Cameron Meyer (AUS); Callum Scotson (AUS)	Mark Cavendish (GBR); Peter Kennaugh (GBR)	Kenny De Ketele (BEL); Moreno De Pauw (BEL)
2018	Wim Stroetinga (NED); Yoeri Havik (NED)	Kelland O'Brien (AUS); Leigh Howard (AUS)	Theo Reinhardt (GER); Roger Kluge (GER)
2019	Elia Viviani (ITA); Simone Consonni (ITA)	Mark Cavendish (GBR); Owain Doull (GBR)	Wim Stroetinga (NED); Yoeri Havik (NED)
