= Piet van Kempen =

Dutch track cyclist

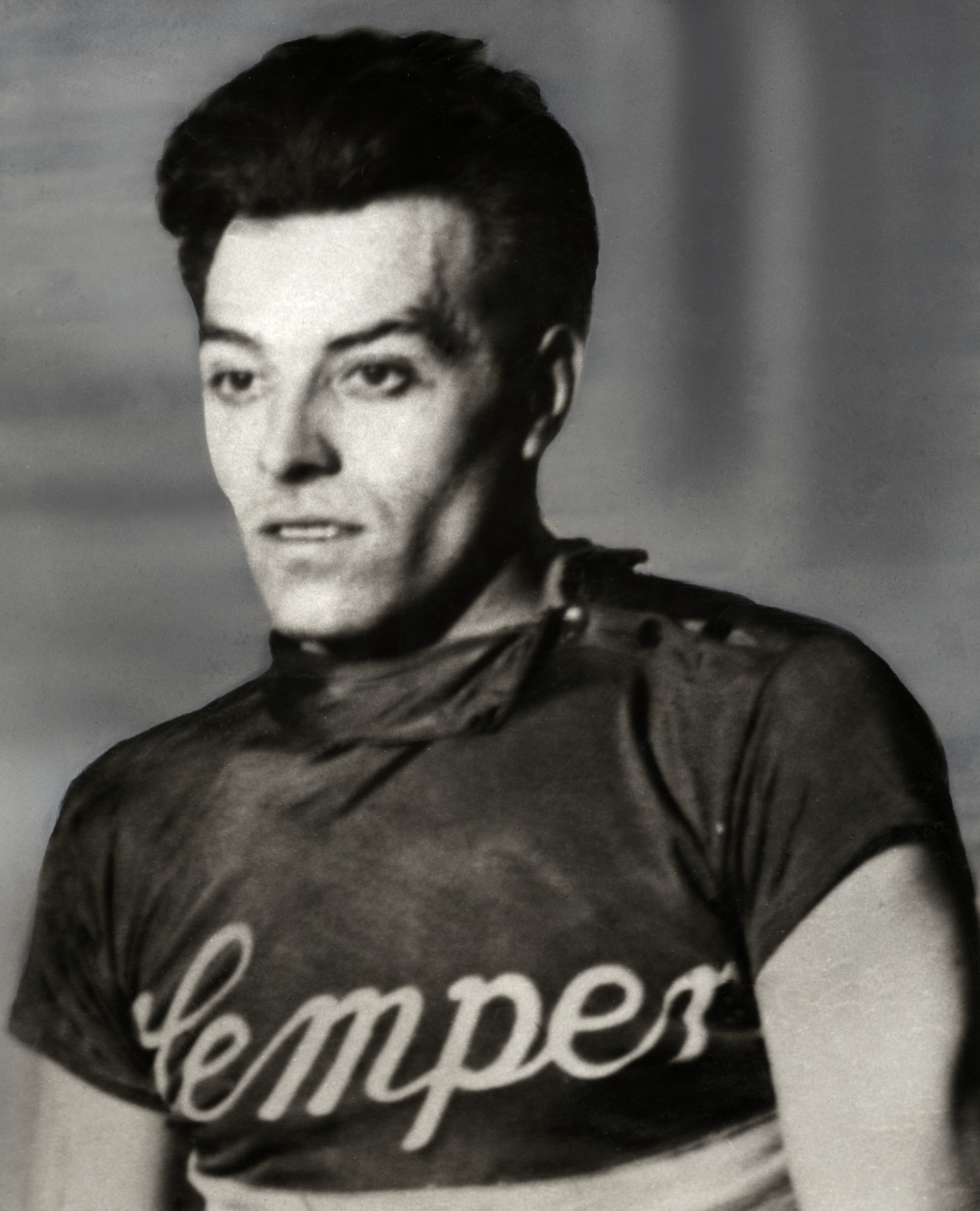
- van Kempen in 1936

Personal information
- Full name: Pieter Dingeman van Kempen
- Nicknames: "Flying Dutchman" "Zwarte Piet"
- Born: 12 December 1898 Ooltgensplaat, Netherlands
- Died: 5 May 1985 (aged 86) Brussels, Belgium

Cycling career
- Sport: Cycling
- Discipline: Track
- Role: Rider
- Rider type: Six-day racer

Pieter Dingeman "Piet" van Kempen (12 December 1898 – 5 May 1985) was a Dutch track cyclist. Professional from 1919 to 1942 and again in the 1950s, he competed in 108 six-day races, and won 32. Due to these successes, he was regarded as one of the best six-day racers of the era, and was given the nicknames "Flying Dutchman" and "Zwarte Piet".

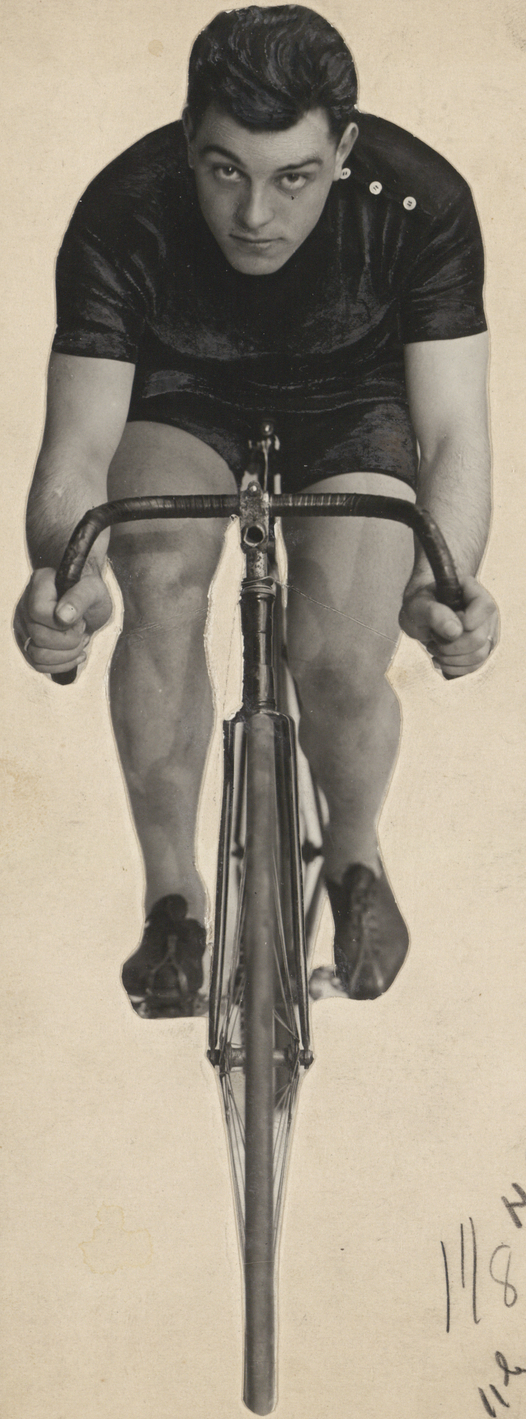
Piet van Kempen, 1898-1985

== Six-day race wins ==
- 1921: New York (with Oscar Egg)
- 1922: Brussels (with Émile Aerts)
- 1923: Paris (with Oscar Egg)
- 1924: New York (with Reginald McNamara)
- 1925: Brussels (with Émile Aerts), Paris (with Alfred Beyl)
- 1926: Breslau (with Ernst Feja), Brussels (with Klaas van Nek)
- 1927: Berlin (with Maurice De Wolf)
- 1928: Chicago (with Mike Rodak), Stuttgart (with Theo Frankenstein), Dortmund (with Maurice De Wolf)
- 1929: Stuttgart (with Paul Buschenhagen)
- 1930: Berlin, Breslau, Brussels (with Paul Buschenhagen), Saint-Étienne (with Francis Fauré), Montreal (with Joe Laporte)
- 1931: Breslau (with Willy Rieger)
- 1932: Amsterdam (with Jan Pijnenburg), Paris (with Jan Pijnenburg), Marseille (with Armand Blanchonnet), Dortmund (with Jan Pijnenburg)
- 1933: Cleveland (with Jules Audy)
- 1934: San Francisco (with Jack McCoy), London (with Sydney Cozens), Minneapolis (with Reginald Fielding & Heinz Vopel)
- 1935: Kansas City (with William Peden) and San Francisco (with James Corcoran)
- 1936: Saint-Étienne (with Jean Van Buggenhout)
- 1937: London (with Albert Buysse) and Saint-Étienne (with Jean Van Buggenhout)
