= Tommy Hall (cyclist) =

English professional track racing cyclist

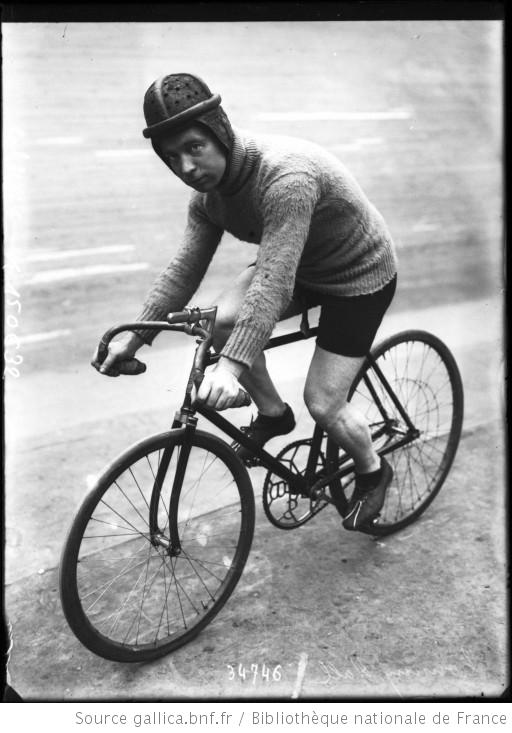

Personal information
- Full name: William Thomas Hall
- Nickname: Tommy
- Born: October–December 1876 England; United Kingdom
- Died: 26 April 1949

Cycling career
- Sport: Cycling
- Discipline: Track
- Role: Rider

Professional team
- 1900–1914: -

Major wins
- World Motor-paced Hour Record Holder

William Thomas Hall, better known as Tommy Hall, (born October–December 1876 – 26 April 1949) was an English professional track racing cyclist.

== Biography ==
Born in Croydon, London, Hall was a professional cyclist between 1900 and 1914.

Hall broke the world motor-paced hour record in 1903, completing 54.34 miles (87.45 kilometres). He won the first London Six Day race, partnered with fellow Brit Martin, covering 839 miles in 36 hours. He also came third in the European stayer (motor-paced) championship in 1904.

During the 1901 census, Hall was 24, living with his family at 104 Shepherd's Bush Road, London, his occupation was listed as cycle maker. His father, Nathaniel Hall, was a furniture retailer.

Hall died aged 72 in 1949, his grave lies in Abney Park Cemetery in Stoke Newington, London, a few feet away from the statue of Dr Isaac Watts. The headstone inscription reads:

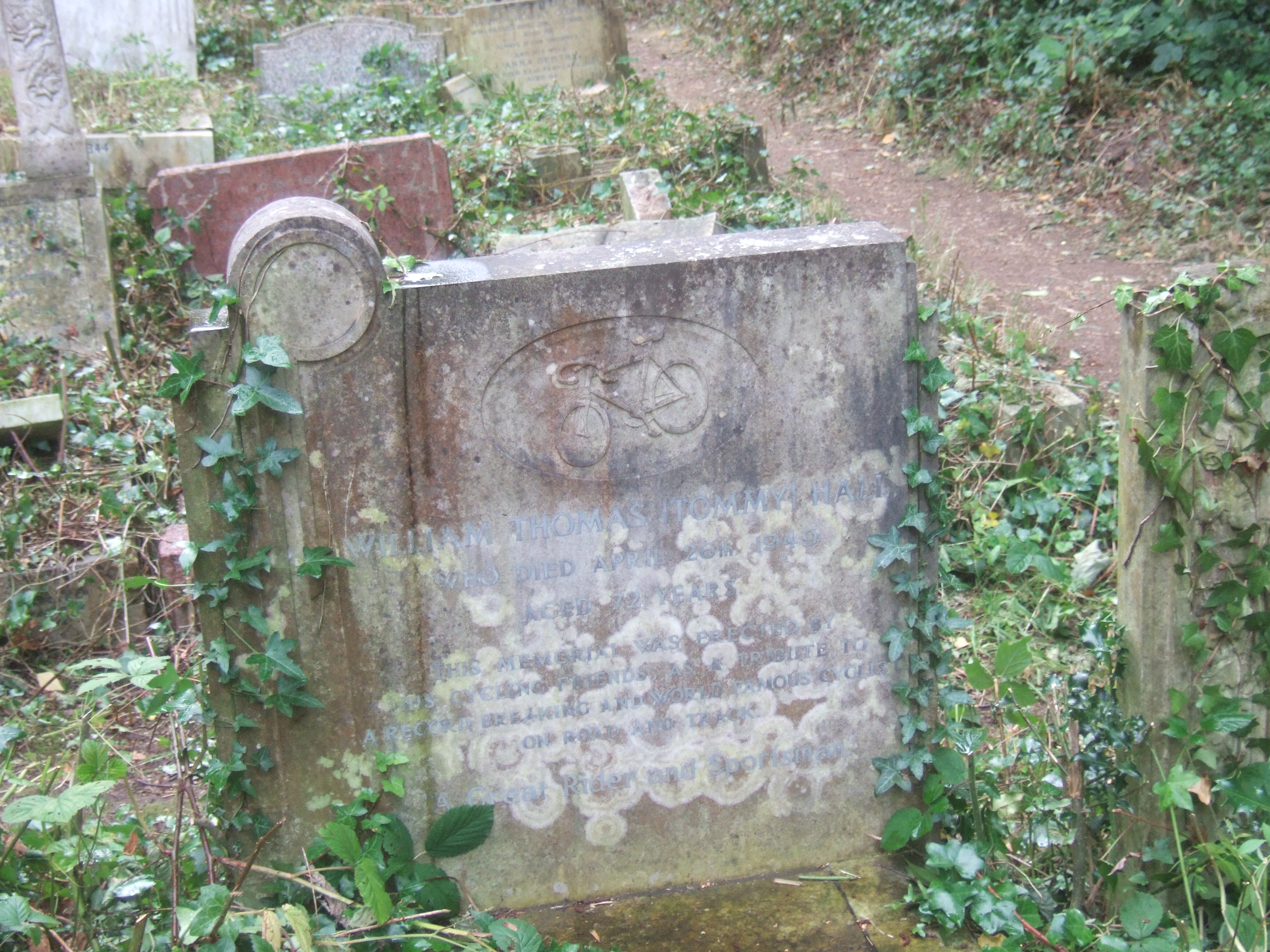
Tommy Hall's gravestone

William Thomas (Tommy) Hall
Who died 26 April 1949
Aged 72 years
This memorial was erected
by his cycling friends as a tribute to
a record breaking and world famous cyclist
on road and track
A great rider and sportsman

.

His body was found on 26 April but he was last seen alive on 14 April 1949; his last address given as 40 Sotheby Road, Highbury.
