= Francesco Verri =

Italian cyclist (1885–1945)

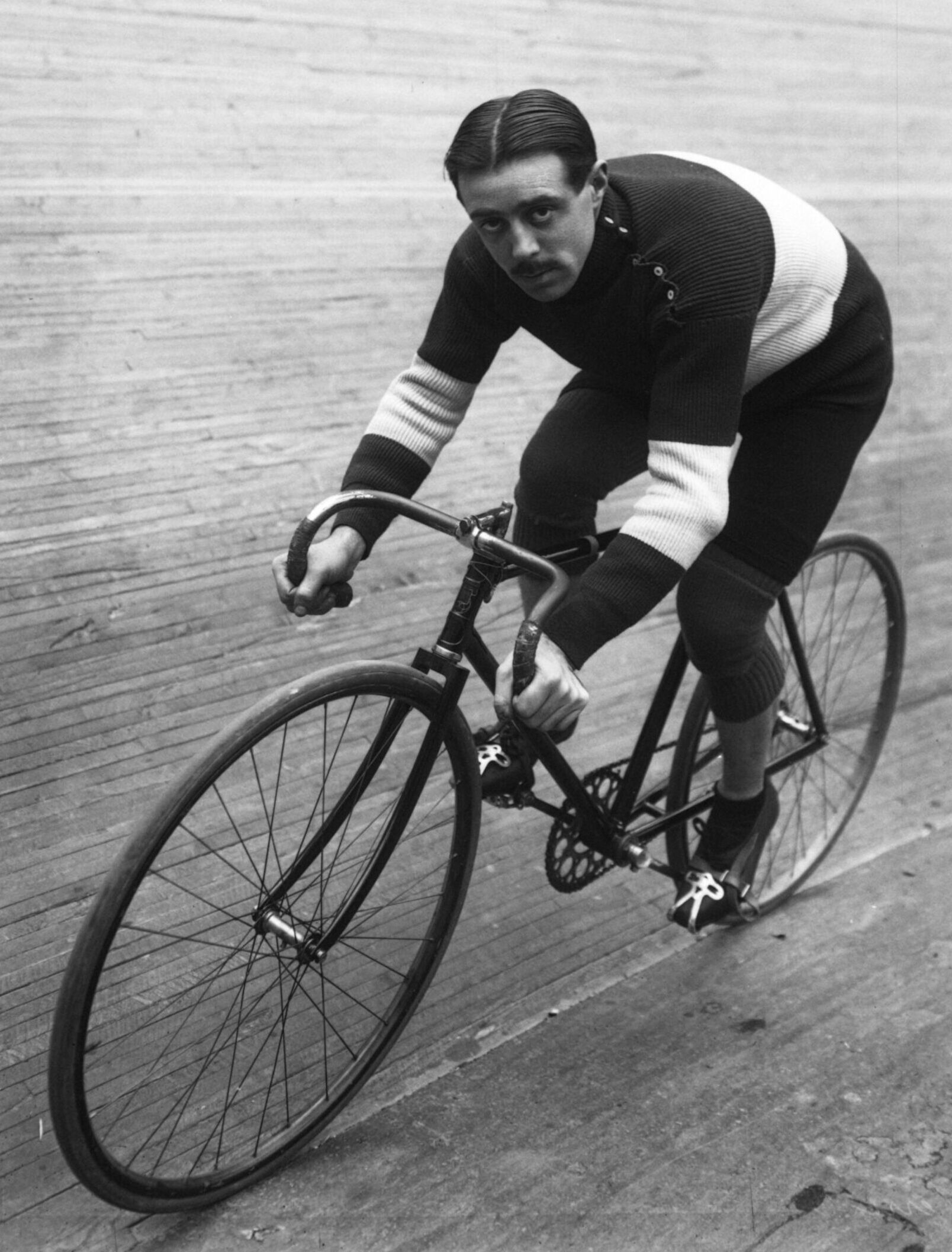
- Verri in 1913

Personal information
- Full name: Francesco Verri
- Born: 11 July 1885 Mantua, Italy
- Died: 6 June 1945 (aged 59) Piombino, Italy

Cycling career
- Sport: Cycling
- Discipline: Track
- Role: Rider
Medal record
Men's track cycling
Representing Italy
Intercalated Games
Gold medal – first place	1906 Athens	Sprint
Gold medal – first place	1906 Athens	Time trial
Gold medal – first place	1906 Athens	5000 m

Francesco Verri (11 June 1885 – 6 June 1945) was an Italian track cycling racer who won three gold medals at the 1906 Intercalated Games in Athens. He later won the Six Days of Buffalo in 1915, teaming with Reggie McNamara.
