= Ernest Kockler =

American cyclist

Personal information
- Born: July 16, 1892 Chicago, Illinois, United States
- Died: September 20, 1970 (aged 78) Libertyville, Illinois, United States

Cycling career
- Sport: Cycling

Ernest Kockler (July 16, 1892 – September 20, 1970) was an American cyclist. He competed in two events at the 1920 Summer Olympics.
