= 1924 Tour of Flanders =

Cycling race

8th Tour of Flanders
Race details
- Dates: 23 March 1924
- Stages: 1
- Distance: 284 km (176.5 mi)
- Winning time: 10h 19' 00"

Results
| | Winner | Gerard Debaets (BEL) | (Labor–Dunlop) |
| | Second | René Vermandel (BEL) | (Alcyon–Dunlop) |
| | Third | Felix Sellier (BEL) | (Alcyon–Dunlop) |

The eighth running of the Tour of Flanders cycling classic was held on Tuesday, 23 March 1924. Belgian track specialist Gerard Debaets won the race after a solo breakaway. René Vermandel and Felix Sellier completed the podium. 17 of 63 riders finished.

== Route ==
The race started and finished in Ghent – totaling 284 km. The course featured two categorized climbs:

- Tiegemberg
- Kwaremont

== Results ==
Result
| Rank | Rider | Team | Time |
|---|---|---|---|
| 1 | Gerard Debaets (BEL) | Labor–Dunlop | 10h 19' 00" |
| 2 | René Vermandel (BEL) | Alcyon–Dunlop | + 20" |
| 3 | Felix Sellier (BEL) | Alcyon–Dunlop | + 31" |
| 4 | Paul Deman (BEL) | La Française–Diamant–Dunlop | + 41" |
| 5 | Jules Vanhevel (BEL) | Wonder–Rusell | + 5' 00" |
| 6 | Nicolas Frantz (LUX) | Thomann–Dunlop | s.t. |
| 7 | Denis Verschueren (BEL) | Wonder–Rusell | + 20' 33" |
| 8 | Maurice Dewaele (BEL) | Wonder–Rusell | + 33' 00" |
| 9 | Jules Matton (BEL) | Thomann–Dunlop | s.t. |
| 10 | Hilaire Hellebaut (BEL) | Wonder–Rusell | s.t. |
