= Robert Lelangue =

Belgian cyclist

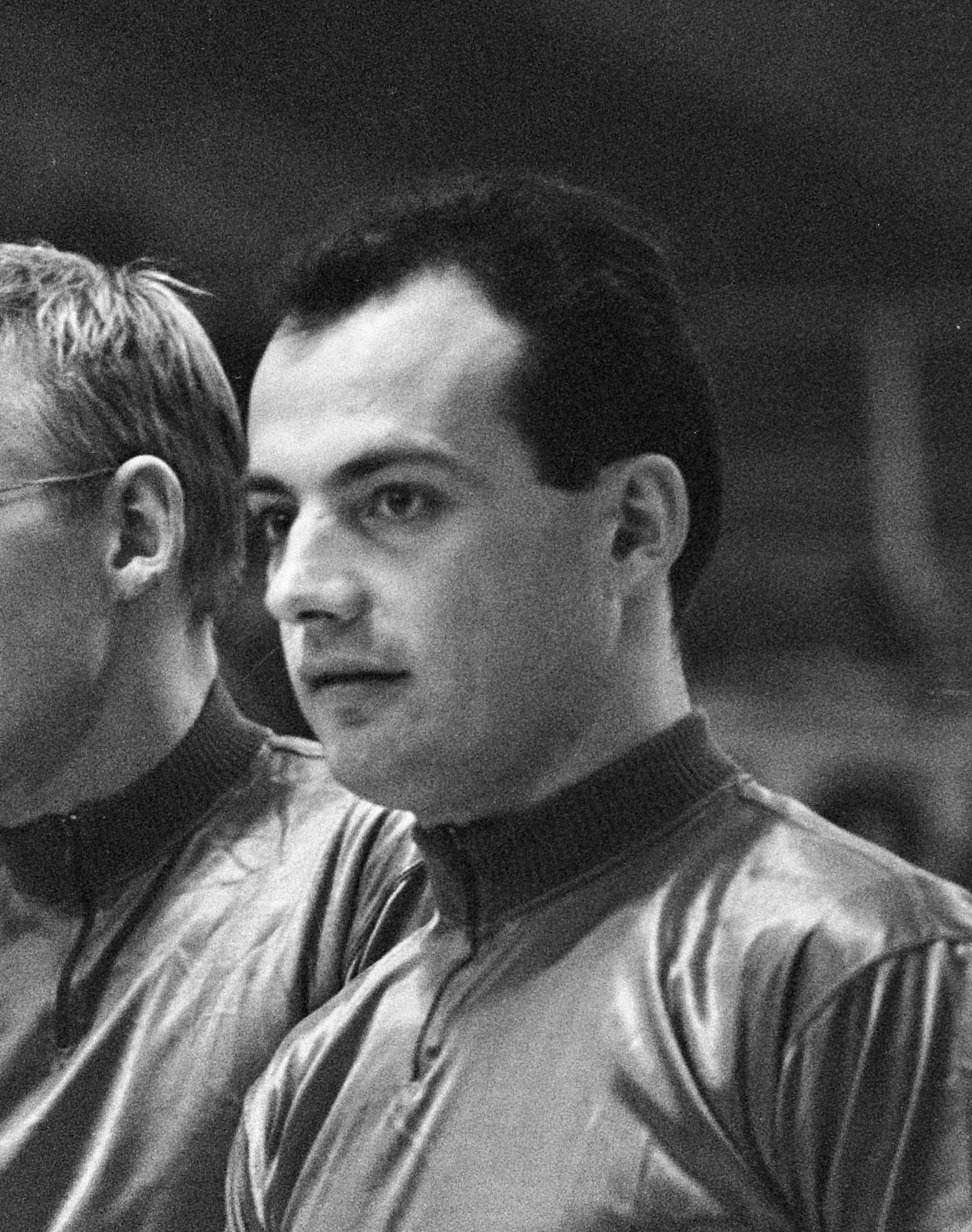
- Lelangue in 1966

Personal information
- Born: 4 February 1940 (age 86) Etterbeek, Belgium
- Height: 1.81 m (5 ft 11 in)
- Weight: 72 kg (159 lb)

Sport
- Sport: Cycling

Robert Lelangue (born 4 February 1940) is a retired Belgian cyclist who was active between 1958 and 1969. He competed at the 1960 Summer Olympics in the road race and finished in 49th place. Next year he turned professional and won one stage of the Tour de Luxembourg. Later he won a few races, including stage 2 in Four Days of Dunkirk (1963), the six-day race of Montreal (1964) and the Grote Prijs Jef Scherens (1967).

After retiring from competitions Lelangue worked as a cycling manager, and from 1986 to 2005 as a technical support staff with the Tour de France. His son John became a manager in cycling.
