= Reggie McNamara =

Australian cyclist

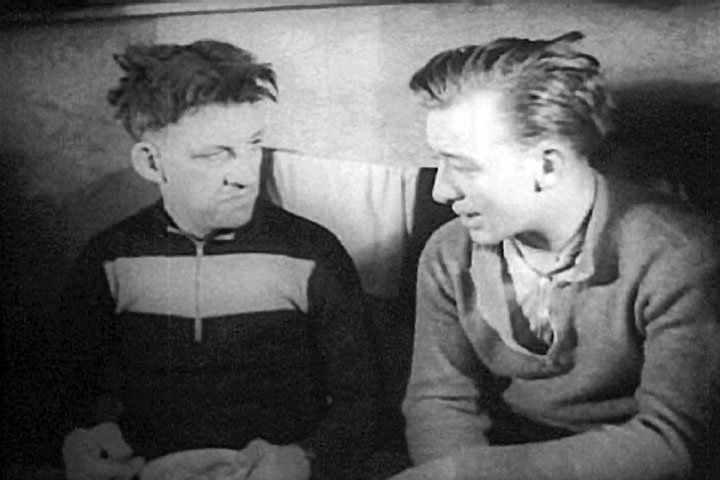
- Cyclist Reggie MacNamara with his cycling partner Edward Seufert

Personal information
- Full name: Reggie McNamara
- Nicknames: 'Iron Bones', 'Iron man', 'Iron McNamara'
- Born: 7 November 1887 Grenfell, New South Wales, Australia
- Died: October 1971 (aged 83–84)

Cycling career
- Sport: Cycling
- Disciplines: Road and Track; Sprints and Endurance
- Role: Rider

Major wins
- 1913 - Sydney Six-days; 1915-1917 - 5 World records, 1–25 miles 1918-1932 - 7x Six-days at Madison Square Garden; 1918-1932 - 5x Six-days at Chicago; Six-day races in France, Belgium, Switzerland, Germany and England; More than 700 career victories

Reggie McNamara (born Grenfell, New South Wales, Australia, 7 November 1887, died Belleville, New Jersey, United States, October 1970 or 1971 or 1972) was an Australian cyclist known as a roughhouse velodrome rider with a string of dramatic crashes and broken bones over 20 years. He was known as the Iron Man. He specialised in six-day races but rode races from 200m sprints to 100 km endurance races. He rode 3,000 races on three continents over 30 years and won more than 700 before he retired aged 50 in 1937.

== Background ==
Reggie McNamara grew up in the Australian countryside, the son of a sheep rancher. A snake bit him on a finger when he was 12 and hunting rabbits with his brother. He and his brother chopped off the finger with an axe. He and his 13 brothers and sisters learned to ride on the same bicycle. He began racing for money in local fairs around Sydney, shooting kangaroos and selling their skins to raise the entry fee. Some reports say he was 14, others 16.

He won his first race, over a mile and a half on a dirt track, and travelled across Australia and New Zealand to wherever he could find races. He won the Sydney six-day race at the start of 1913 and caught the eye of Alf Goullet, an Australian international who had been asked to find two good Australians to race in Newark, New Jersey, United States. Goullet signed just McNamara, telling the historian Peter Nye that McNamara was worth any two other riders.

== International career ==
"Reggie did crash a lot. But he caused a lot of his crashes. He would go and go and ride himself dead and then fall down."

— The American rider, Bill Honeman, quoted by historian Peter Nye.

McNamara went to the US and took American nationality when he married an Irish nurse, Elizabeth McDonough in 1913, whom he had met after breaking a leg during his first training ride. They had two daughters, Eileen and Regina. McNamara set five world records from one to 25 miles at Newark velodrome in 1915, 1916 and 1917. He won seven six-day races at Madison Square Garden in New York between 1918 and 1932, another five at the Chicago Coliseum and other six-day races in France, Belgium, Switzerland, Germany and England. He won the 1932 Madison Square Garden six-day at the age of 45. His winnings up to 1933 reached the modern equivalent of at least A$2 000 000. McNamara was known for spectacular crashes on the steep wooden tracks. He crashed up to 20 times in some sixes.

An American newspaper reported:

To undergo a serious operation on the fourth day of a six-day race and then finish the contest and run third, less than a wheel's length behind the winner, is going some. But that is what Reggie McNamara did and he did it against the advice of doctors, his family and the rider who was his mate in the race. So often has this fellow pulled through tight places solely on his nerve he has been dubbed the "Iron Man" of cycling.

It was in the Melbourne, Australia, six day race two years ago that McNamara jumped off his wheel, had an incision several inches long made in his side and then resumed the race after more than a dozen stitches were taken to bring the gap together. An abscess the size of a tennis ball was removed, and, although the rider lost considerable blood, he started a sprint immediately upon going on the track to relieve his partner, who was little Jackie Clark, one of the greatest of all six-day riders. No anaesthetic was used in the operation which shows the iron nerve possessed by the cyclist. During the painful operation the "Iron Man" never winced, ignoring his own troubles, he enquired continually about Clark, who was in poor condition and riding none too well.

By 1946 McNamara calculated he had broken his collarbone 17 times, his skull, nose and leg once each, his jaw in three places. He had needed 500 surgical stitches and suffered concussion five times. He had 47 scars, "one of them, running along his right cheek, gives his dark and friendly face a dangerous look which he enhances by wearing black sweaters and scowling."

When a reporter asked McNamara if he parted his hair down the middle because movie star Rudolph Valentino did, he shook his head:

"That's just so the sawbones has a centre point to start from."

The American magazine, Time, described him as "a friendly, mild-mannered man with a deep scar in his right cheek." Peter Nye said:

He distinguished himself by winning the [Madison Square] Garden's six-days in March and December in 1926, but only after narrowly averting disaster. In the final 15 minutes during the heat of the action in December when McNamara and his partner, Pietro Linari of Italy, were trading places, both were caught in a spectacular high-speed crash. They were knocked out cold. McNamara was the first to regain his senses. He staggered to retrieve his bicycle and told the doctor, "If my legs are all right, I'm going back in." He got back on his bike to win the race. Afterward, he discovered he had cracked three ribs.

McNamara won his 19th and final six-day victory in Cleveland, USA, in January 1933. His partner, Norman Hill, was 26 and born the year McNamara began racing.

== Retirement ==
The Depression and then the war ended the six-day circuit in the USA. McNamara was already 45 when he rode his last six-day. He worked as a race official while the races lasted and then in a school kitchen. He wrote his life story but failed to find a publisher. He died at 83 of a stroke in Belleville, survived by his wife, daughters, four grandchildren and two great-grandchildren.

Peter Nye said:

He is credited in VeloPlus, the Belgian reference book, with 19 six-day victories and finishing 108 sixes. He still ranks in VeloPlus's all-time top 25 six-day racers. Considering that he pedalled about 1,250 miles in each six-day, he churned some 135,000 racing miles in his career - more than enough to commute five times around the globe.

== Drugs ==
The journalist René de Latour, who worked as McNamara's track manager for several years, said of a chase at the Velodrome d'Hiver in Paris:

It was one of the toughest races of Mac's career. The last jam lasted NINE HOURS, with teams all over the track as if in a marathon pursuit. The 12th and 13th teams to finish were 17 laps back at the end (the Vel' d'Hiv' was about seven laps to a mile). No wonder Mac fell asleep in the taxi when I took him back to a hotel. Such punishing efforts could hardly be done on mineral water and Mac had his secrets. He kept them in a small case and, if I was keeper of the key, I never found out what they were made of. There were all kinds of pills in phials without any names on them, and I knew it was useless to ask Mac what they were. But I guess Mac knew what he was doing.

== Anecdote ==
The magazine Time believed in 1932 that it had found another Iron Man. It reported:

Most celebrated of McNamara's confreres is Franco Giorgetti, a small knock-kneed Italian who finished a sulky last in last week's race, but failed to butt his head against a wall for losing as he did once. Obviously heir to Iron McNamara, Giorgetti was once pierced by an eight-inch splinter which he sent to his father to be exhibited. He earns $28,000 per year, has a barber shave him every day of the race, frequently dines on rice, lobster and beer with Tenor Benjiamino Gigli of the Metropolitan Opera Company.

== Six-day victories ==
Six Day victories
| Nr | Year | Event | Partner | Number |
|---|---|---|---|---|
| 1 | 1913 | Sydney | Frank Corry (AUS) | 1 |
| 2 | 1915 | Newark | Robert Spears (AUS) | 1 |
| 3 | 1915 | Buffalo | Francesco Verri (ITA) | 2 |
| 4 | 1916 | Chicago | Robert Spears (AUS) | 1 |
| 5 | 1916 | Kansas City | Eddy Madden (USA) | 1 |
| 6 | 1917 | Chicago | Francesco Verri (ITA) | 2 |
| 7 | 1918 | New York | Jake Magin (USA) | 1 |
| 8 | 1922-1 | New York | Alfred Grenda (AUS) | 1 |
| 9 | 1925-1 | New York | Piet van Kempen (NED) | 1 |
| 10 | 1925-1 | Chicago | Bob Walthour (USA) | 2 |
| 11 | 1926-1 | Berlin | Harry Horan (USA) | 1 |
| 12 | 1926-1 | Chicago | Bob Walthour (USA) | 2 |
| 13 | 1926-1 | New York | Franco Giorgetti (ITA) | 2 |
| 14 | 1926-2 | New York | Pietro Linari (ITA) | 1 |
| 15 | 1927 | Paris | Emile Aerts (BEL) | 1 |
| 16 | 1927-1 | New York | Franco Giorgetti (ITA) | 2 |
| 17 | 1929-1 | Chicago | Gaetano Belloni (ITA) | 1 |
| 18 | 1929-2 | Chicago | Gaetano Belloni (ITA) | 1 |
| 19 | 1932-1 | New York | William Peden (CAN) | 1 |
| 20 | 1932-2 | Toronto | Alfred Crossley (USA) | 1 |
| 21 | 1933-1 | Cleveland | Norman Hill (USA) | 1 |
