= Émile Ignat =

French cyclist

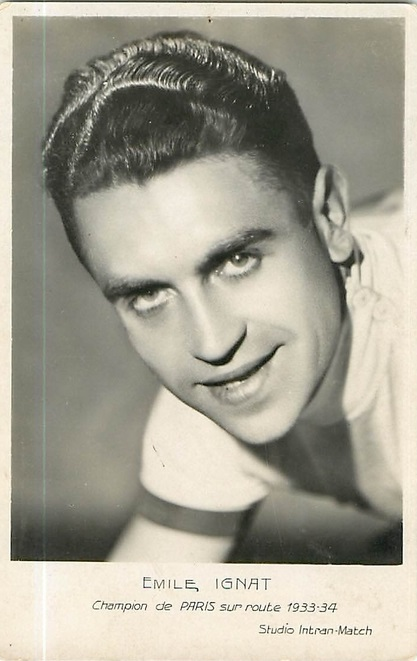

Personal information
- Born: 21 March 1908 Coye-la-Forêt, France
- Died: 28 June 1981 (aged 73) Clichy, France

Cycling career
- Sport: Cycling
- Discipline: Road
- Role: Rider

Émile Ignat (21 March 1908 – 28 June 1981) was a French racing cyclist. He rode in the 1933 Tour de France.
