= Henry O'Brien (cyclist) =

American cyclist

Personal information
- Born: April 5, 1910 San Jose, California, United States
- Died: April 18, 1973 (aged 63) Santa Clara County, California, United States

Cycling career
- Sport: Cycling

Henry O'Brien (April 5, 1910 – April 18, 1973) was an American cyclist. He competed at the 1928 and 1932 Summer Olympics.
