= Doug Peden =

Canadian basketball player

Olympic medal record

Men's basketball
Silver medal – second place	1936 Berlin	Team competition

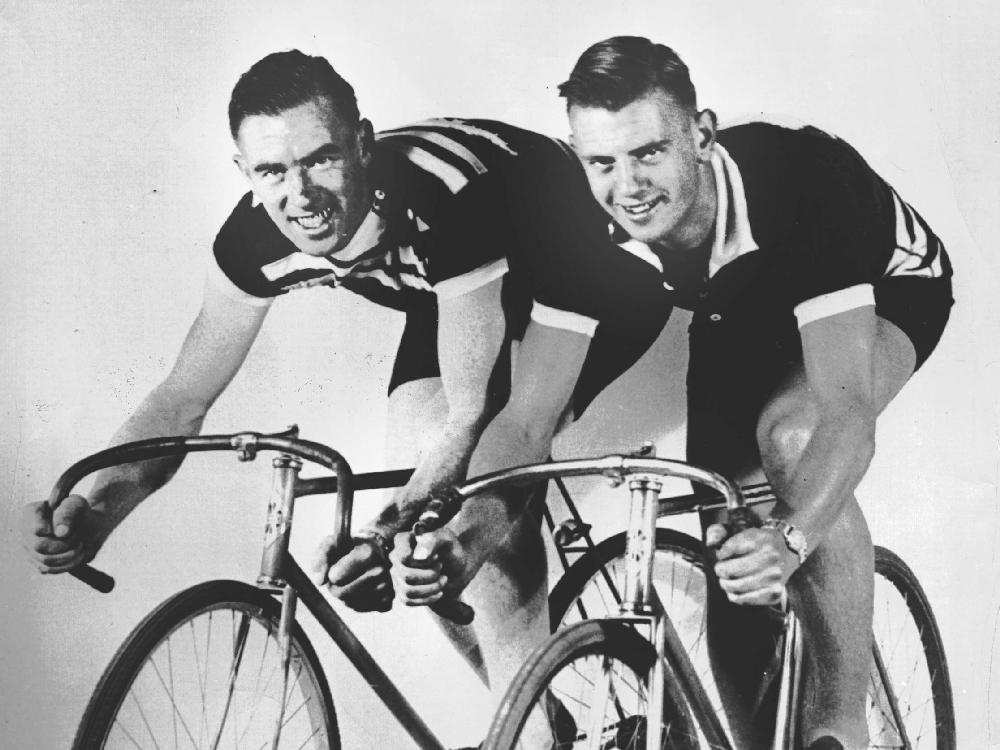
Brothers Torchy and Doug Peden

James Douglas Peden (April 18, 1916 – April 11, 2005) was a Canadian basketball player who competed at the 1936 Summer Olympics.

Peden was inducted into the Canadian Sports Hall of Fame in 1979 and is considered to have placed second to Lionel Conacher, being named Canada's athlete-of-the-half century in 1950.

Born in Victoria, British Columbia, he was part of the Canadian basketball team, which won the silver medal. He played five matches including the final.

Inducted into the BC Sports Hall of Fame in 1967 as an All-round Athlete, Peden excelled in track, swimming, tennis, rugby, baseball, basketball, and cycling.

In the 1930s Doug and his older brother Torchy (William) competed in six-day bike races. They teamed to win the Six Days of Buffalo in 1937. Torchy was inducted into the BC Sports Hall of Fame for cycling in 1966.

When Peden was 13 he won the provincial under-15 doubles tennis championship, and at 18 the singles, doubles, and mixed doubles for Vancouver Island.

In 1936 he played rugby against the New Zealand All Blacks, distinguishing himself as the first Canadian to score against them, carrying "only two Maoris" on his back as he scored the try. Later the same year he played on Canada's Olympic Silver medal winning team.
