= George Dempsey (cyclist) =

Australian cyclist (1905–1985)

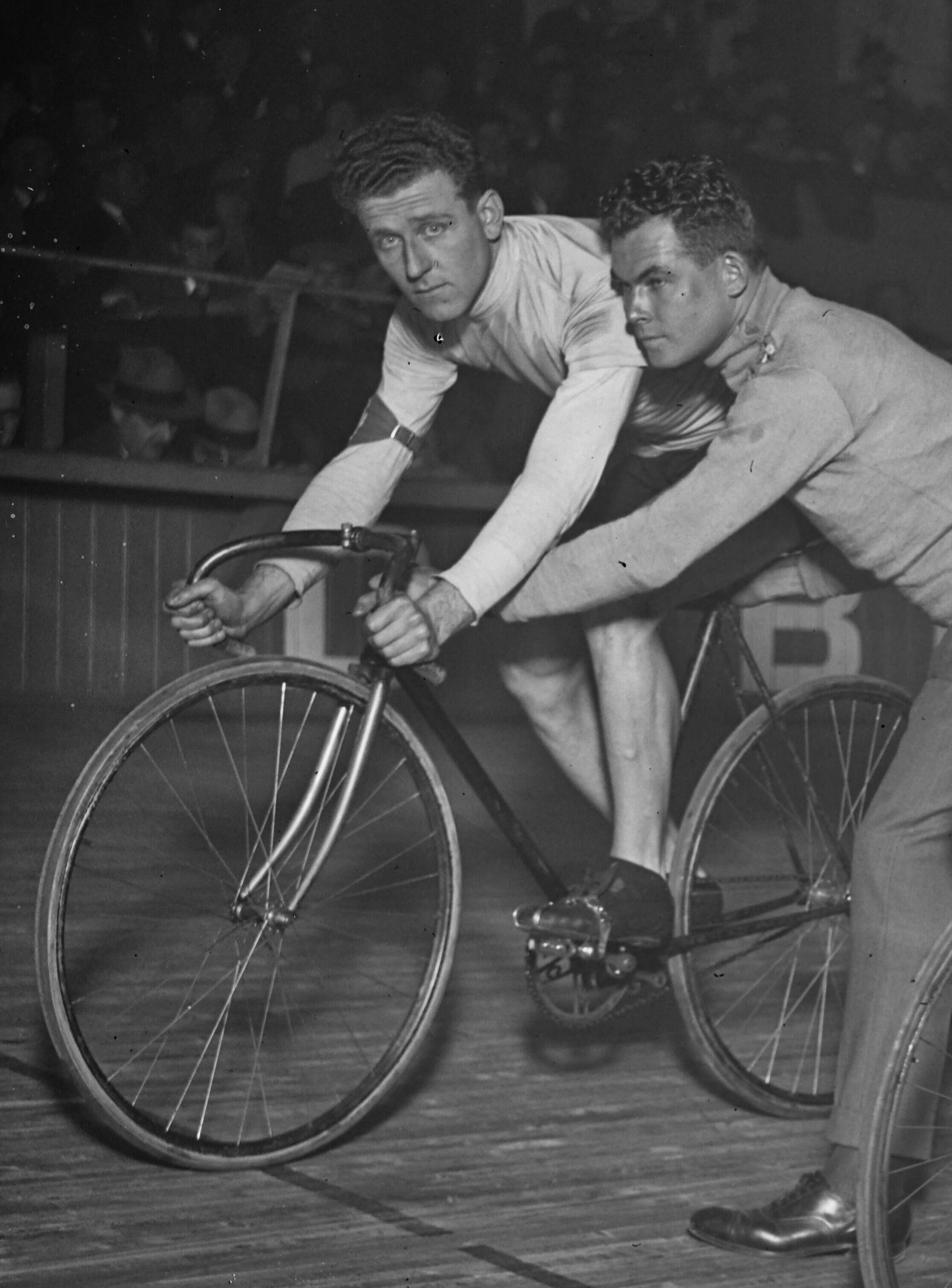

Personal information
- Born: 11 August 1904 Cootamundra, Australia
- Died: 3 August 1985 (aged 79) Corona Del Mar, California, United States

Cycling career
- Sport: Cycling
- Discipline: Track
- Role: Rider

George Dempsey (11 August 1905 – 3 August 1985) was an Australian cyclist. He competed in two events, the men's sprint and the 50 kilometres, at the 1924 Summer Olympics. After his career as a sprinter, Dempsey transitioned to six-day racing, and won three races in addition to multiple podiums.
