= Alfred Letourneur =

French cyclist (1907–1975)

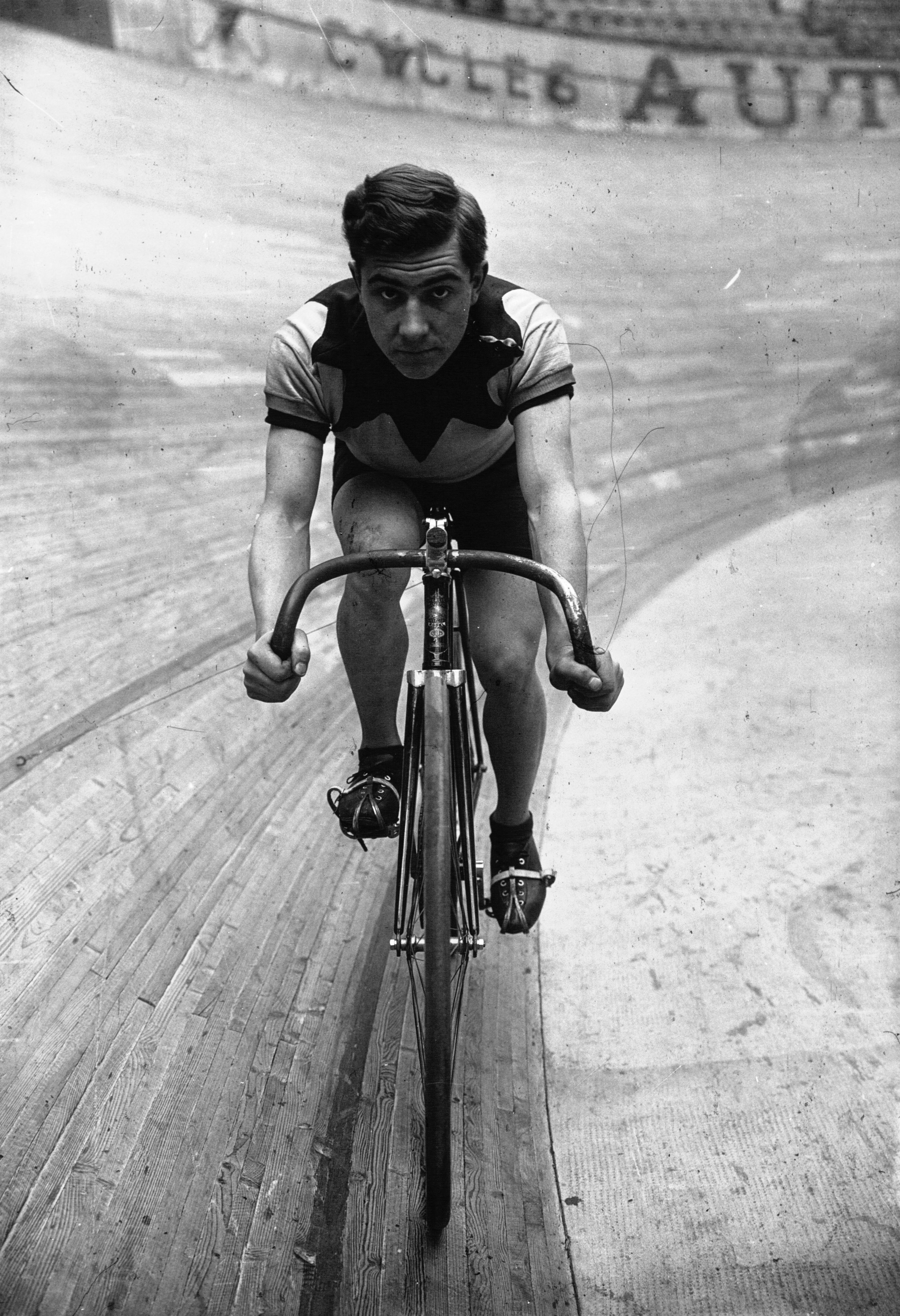
Alfred Letourneur

Alfred Letourneur (born 25 July 1907 in Amiens, France and died 4 January 1975 in New York City) was a French professional cyclist. He is known for setting the motor-paced world speed record. He was professional cyclist from 1928 to 1942. His nickname was "le diable rouge".

== Achievements ==
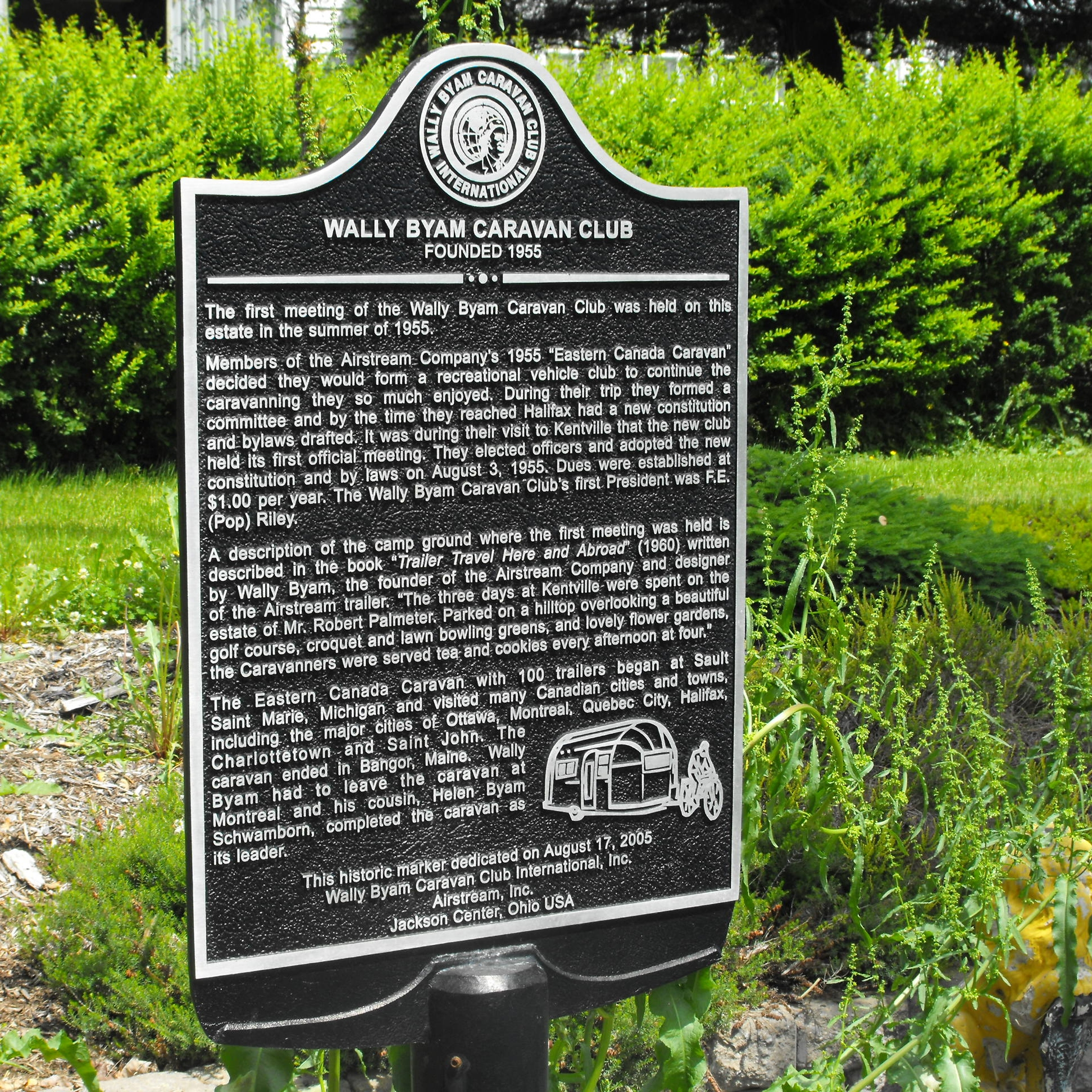
Site marker of the founding meeting of the Wally Byam Caravan Club, in 1955 in Kentville, Nova Scotia, Canada. The plaque shows Alfred Letourneur towing an airstream trailer in 1947

From 1930 to 1938 he reached 20 victories on the "six-day racing" races in the United States and Canada. He also had 4 victories in National Championship, United States, in years 1932, 1933, 1934 and 1935.

On 22 October 1938, Alfred Letourneur was able to beat the motor-paced world speed record on a bicycle, reaching 147.058 km/h at a velodrome in Montlhéry, France, riding behind a motorbike. On 17 May 1941 he broke the record again, reaching 175.29 km/h (108.92 mph) on a Schwinn bicycle riding behind a specially equipped midget racer, on old highway 99 near Bakersfield, California.

In 1947, in Van Nuys, California he towed a 22 feet (6.7 m) long Airstream trailer with his bicycle as a publicity stunt.

== See also ==
- Cycling records
