= William Peden =

Canadian cyclist

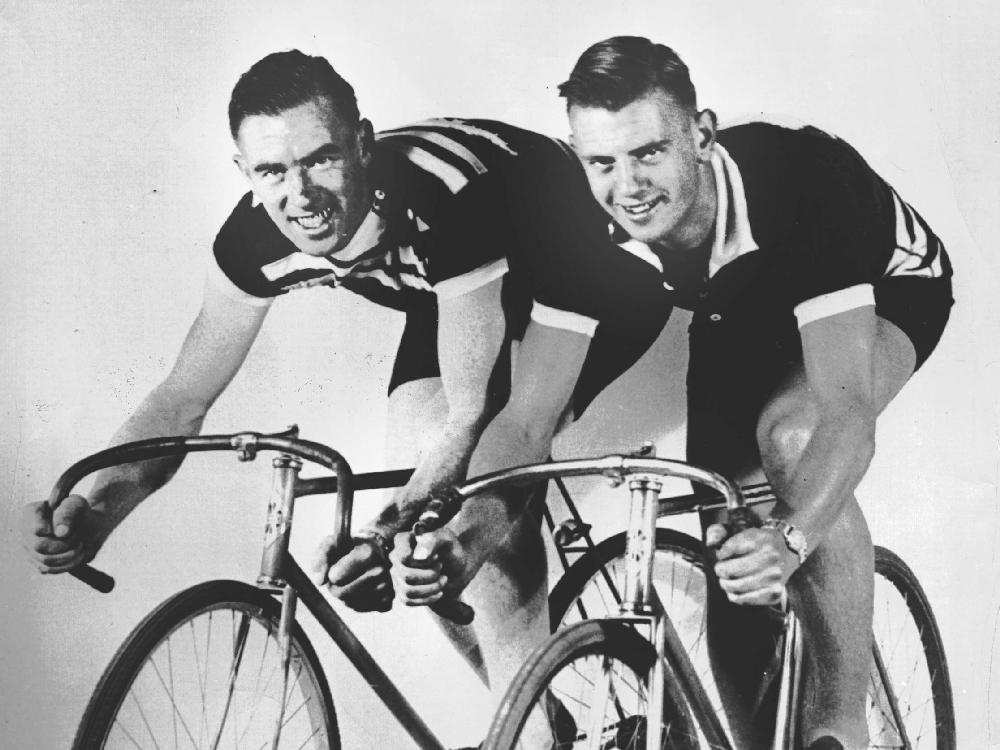

Personal information
- Born: 16 April 1906 Victoria, British Columbia, Canada
- Died: 26 January 1980 (aged 73) Northbrook, Illinois, United States
- Height: 6 ft 3 in (191 cm)
- Weight: 220 lb (100 kg)

Cycling career
- Sport: Cycling
- Discipline: Six-day racing

Professional team

William "Torchy" Peden (16 April 1906 – 26 January 1980) was a Canadian cyclist. He was inducted into Canada's Sports Hall of Fame in 1955 and the BC Sports Hall of Fame in 1966.

== Biography ==
As a youth, Peden was a natural athlete, participating in several sports, and was nationally ranked in swimming. He took up bicycle racing in 1925 and trained intensively for the 1928 Summer Olympics in Amsterdam. He was selected for the Canadian team and competed in three Olympic events. Afterward, he remained in Europe to join the cycling circuit. In 1929, he returned to Canada. After winning five titles at the indoor Canadian championships in Montreal, he turned professional.

He discovered and excelled at six-day racing. During the Great Depression, the sport was cheap for spectators and very popular. Beginning in 1929, he won 24 of 48 races over the next four years. In 1932, he set a record that still stands: 10 victories. At times, he teamed up with his younger brother Doug (the sport used two-man teams). Overall, he won 38 of 148, a record unbroken until 1965. In 1931, he set a record; riding behind a car providing a shield against the wind, he achieved a speed of 73.5 miles per hour (118.3 km/h). He also coached the 1932 national cycling team and the 1936 track team.

He was a showman, popular with the fans. He would grab a scarf or hat from a spectator and ride around with it for a few laps before returning it to its owner. The redhead acquired the nickname "Torchy" when a journalist described him as a "flame-haired youth leading the pack like a torch". He was rumoured to have earned $50,000 a year, an enormous sum at the time. (For comparison, Babe Ruth made $80,000 in 1930.)

During the Second World War, he served in the Royal Canadian Air Force. He participated in his last six-day race in 1942 and his last professional cycling race in 1948.

He moved to the United States in the 1950s and opened a sporting goods store.
