= Rund um Köln =

German one-day road cycling race

Race details
- Date: Varies
- Region: Cologne, Germany
- English name: Tour of Cologne
- Local name: Rund um Köln (in German)
- Discipline: Road
- Competition: UCI Europe Tour
- Type: Single-day
- Web site: www.rundumkoeln.de

History
- First edition: 1908
- Editions: 108 (as of 2026)
- First winner: Fritz Tacke (GER)
- Most wins: Wilfried Trott (GER) (3 wins)
- Most recent: Laurence Pithie (NZ)

The Rund um Köln is a classic cycling race around the German city of Cologne. Since 2005 it is part of the UCI Europe Tour, being organised as 1.1 race (in 2007 the race was categorised as 1.HC). It is one of the oldest cycling races still running in Germany – where media-driven hostility towards professional cycling in the wake of repeated doping scandals has severely weakened the economic structure and viability of the sport. The Rund um Köln is the second-oldest race in Germany, just after Rund um die Hainleite, which was first held in 1908. Between the 1930s and late 1980s Rund um Köln was held as an amateur race. The race was contested every year on Easter Monday from 2000 to 2014. From 2015 until 2019 it was contested on the second Sunday in June.

The centenary edition of the Rund um Köln, set for March 24, 2008, was cancelled due to snow. The 2009 edition was contested by a weakened, sub-par field, as top professional teams did not send their stars, and the riders raced for their country instead.

== Winners ==
Year	Country	Rider	Team
1908	Germany	Fritz Tacke	
1909	Germany	Otto Wincziers	
1910	Germany	Karl Wittig	
1910	Germany	Jean Rosellen	
1911	Germany	Adolf Huschke	
1912	Germany	Jean Steingass	
1913	Germany	Ernst Franz	
1914	Germany	Ernst Franz	
1915– 1918	No race		
1920	Germany	Adam Sachs	
1921	Germany	Adolf Huschke	
1922	Germany	Paul Koch	
1923	Germany	Fritz Fischer	
1924	Germany	Paul Kohl	
1925	Germany	Paul Kohl	
1926	Switzerland	Heiri Suter	
1927	Italy	Gaetano Belloni	
1928	Italy	Alfredo Binda	
1929	Germany	Franz Schmitz	
1930	Germany	Otto Kratz	
1931	Germany	H. Rüdiger	
1932	Luxembourg	Josy Kraus	
1933	Germany	Erich Bautz	
1934	Germany	Kurt Stöpel	Phänomen
1935	Germany	Emil Kijewski	individual
1936	Germany	Erich Bautz	Diamant
1937	Germany	Emil Kijewski	Wanderer
1938	Germany	Franz Bronold	
1939	Germany	Willi Meurer	
1940	Germany	Jakob Kropp	
1941	Germany	Hans Preiskeit	
1942	Germany	Heiner Schwarzer	
1943	Germany	Karl Kittsteiner	
1944	No race		
1945	No race		
1946	Germany	Friedel Nowakowski	
1947	Germany	Werner Holthöfer	
1948	Germany	Heiner Schwarzer	Bismarck
1949	Germany	Heinrich Schultenjohann	Patria W.K.C.
1950	West Germany	Horst Holzmann	
1951	West Germany	Heiner Schwarzer	Adria Renstall
1952	West Germany	R. Popp	
1953	West Germany	Günther Otto	
1954	West Germany	Willi Irrgang	
1955	West Germany	Hans Preiskeit	
1956	West Germany	Edi Ziegler	
1957	West Germany	W. Grabo	
1958	West Germany	Wolf-Jürgen Edler	
1959	West Germany	Heiner Hofmann	
1960	West Germany	Matthias Löder	
1961	Belgium	Albert Smits	
1962	West Germany	Siegfried Koch	
1963	West Germany	Wilfried Bölke	
1964	West Germany	Horst Oldenburg	
1965	West Germany	Horst Oldenburg	
1966	West Germany	Piet Glemser	Torpedo
1967	Belgium	Noël Foré	Goldor-Gerka
1968	West Germany	Burkhard Ebert	
1969	West Germany	Jürgen Tschan	
1970	West Germany	Andreas Streckies	
1971	Luxembourg	Roger Gilson	
1972	West Germany	Wilfried Trott	
1973	West Germany	Hermann Jungbluth	
1974	West Germany	Dietrich Thurau	
1975	West Germany	Jan Smyrak	
1976	West Germany	Wilfried Trott	
1977	Netherlands	Bert Scheunemann	
1978	Netherlands	Arie Hassink	
1979	West Germany	Wilfried Trott	
1980	West Germany	Achim Stadler	
1981	West Germany	Michael Mohr	
1982	West Germany	Jörg Echtermann	
1983	West Germany	Wolf-Dieter Wolfshohl	
1984	West Germany	Stanislaw Mikolajczuk	
1984	Netherlands	Jan Vaanhold	
1986	West Germany	Remig Stumpf	
1987	West Germany	Werner Wüller	
1988	West Germany	Lutz Losch	
1990	Belgium	Noël Segers	Buckler–Colnago–Decca
1991	Belgium	Jerry Cooman	S.E.F.B.–Saxon
1992	Netherlands	Louis de Koning	Panasonic–Sportlife
1993	Belgium	Wim Van Eynde	La William–Duvel
1994	Germany	Udo Bölts	Team Telekom
1995	Netherlands	Erik Dekker	Novell–Decca–Colnago
1996	Germany	Erik Zabel	Team Telekom
1997	Belgium	Frank Vandenbroucke	Mapei–GB
1998	No race		
1999	Germany	Jens Heppner	Team Telekom
2000	Germany	Steffen Wesemann	Team Telekom
2001	Italy	Gian Matteo Fagnini	Team Telekom
2002	Austria	Peter Wrolich	Gerolsteiner
2003	Germany	Jan Ullrich	Team Coast
2004	Germany	Erik Zabel	T-Mobile Team
2005	Germany	David Kopp	Team Wiesenhof
2006	Germany	Christian Knees	Team Milram
2007	Argentina	Juan José Haedo	Team CSC
2008	No race due to snow		
2009	Denmark	Martin Pedersen	Denmark (national team)
2010	Argentina	Juan José Haedo	Team Saxo Bank
2011	Australia	Michael Matthews	Rabobank
2012	Czech Republic	Jan Bárta	Team NetApp
2013	Belgium	Sébastien Delfosse	Crelan–Euphony
2014	Ireland	Sam Bennett	NetApp–Endura
2015	Belgium	Tom Boonen	Etixx–Quick-Step
2016	Netherlands	Dylan Groenewegen	LottoNL–Jumbo
2017	Austria	Gregor Mühlberger	Bora–Hansgrohe
2018	Ireland	Sam Bennett	Bora–Hansgrohe
2019	Belgium	Baptiste Planckaert	Wallonie Bruxelles
2020– 2021	No race due to the COVID-19 pandemic in Germany		
2022	Germany	Nils Politt	Bora–Hansgrohe
2023	Netherlands	Danny van Poppel	Bora–Hansgrohe
2024	Netherlands	Casper van Uden	Team dsm–firmenich PostNL
2025	Great Britain	Matthew Brennan	Visma–Lease a Bike
2026	New Zealand	Laurence Pithie	Red Bull–Bora–Hansgrohe
