= Rund um Berlin =

Classic cycling race in Germany

Race details
- Date: Early-September
- Region: Berlin, Germany
- English name: Tour of Berlin
- Local name: Rund um Berlin (in German)
- Discipline: Road
- Competition: UCI Europe Tour (2008)
- Type: One-day

History
- First edition: 1896
- Editions: 95
- Final edition: 2008
- First winner: Gustav Gräben (GER)
- Most wins: Klaus Ampler (GDR) (5 wins)
- Final winner: Robert Bartko (GER)

The Rund um Berlin was a classic cycling race based around the German city of Berlin. Beginning in 1896, it was the oldest cycling race in Germany until it ended in 2008.

Although it was one of the oldest races in the world, its importance was restricted to Germany. It was usually only contested by Germans, and only four times was the winner not German.

== Winners ==
Year	Country	Rider	Team
1896	Germany	Gustav Gräben	
1897	Germany	Gustav Gräben	
1902	Germany	Otto Goetzke	
1903	Germany	Otto Goetzke	
1904	Germany	Franz Scholz	
1905	Germany	Adolf Böhm	
1906	Germany	Otto Goetzke	
1907	Germany	Max Faustmann	
1908	Germany	Adolf Böhm	
1909	Germany	Jakob Meck	
1910	Germany	Carl Saldow	
1911	Germany	Adolf Huschke	
1912	Germany	Erich Aberger	
1913	Germany	Ernst Franz	
1914	No race		
1915	Germany	Karl Wittig	
1916-1918	No race		
1919	Germany	Paul Koch	
1920	Germany	Paul Kohl	
1921	Germany	Erich Aberger	
1922	Germany	Richard Schenkel	
1923	Germany	Erich Aberger	
1924	Germany	Paul Kohl	
1925	Germany	Oskar Tietz	
1926	Germany	Siegfried Schütze	
1927	Germany	Bruno Wolke	
1928	Germany	Walter Hoffmann	
1929	Germany	Rudolf Risch	
1930	Germany	Walter Merkan	
1931	Germany	Willy Kutschbach	
1932	Germany	Walter Bartholomäus	
1933	Germany	Emil Kijewski	
1934	Germany	Kurt Stöpel	
1935	Germany	Bruno Roth	
1936	Germany	Fritz Ruland	
1937	Germany	Emil Kijewski	
1938	Germany	Bruno Gerber	
1939	Germany	Bruno Gerber	
1940	Germany	Walter Liebl	
1941	Germany	Harry Saager	
1942	Germany	Harry Saager	
1943-1945	No race		
1946	Germany	Karl Wiemer	
1947	Germany	Hans Preiskeit	
1948	Germany	Heinrich Schultenjohann	
1949	Germany	Reinhold Steinhilb	
1950	East Germany	Bernhard Trefflich	
1951	East Germany	Gustav-Adolf Schur	
1952	East Germany	Rudi Kirchhoff	
1953	East Germany	Erich Schulz	
1954	East Germany	Rudi Kirchhoff	
1955	East Germany	Konrad Claus	
1956	East Germany	Rudi Kirchhoff	
1957	Belgium	Louis Legros	
1958	East Germany	Rudi Kirchhoff	
1959	East Germany	Klaus Ampler	
1960	East Germany	Klaus Ampler	
1961	East Germany	Manfred Weißleder	
1962	East Germany	Lothar Höhne	
1963	East Germany	Lothar Höhne	
1964	East Germany	Klaus Ampler	
1965	East Germany	Klaus Ampler	
1966	East Germany	Dieter Grabe	
1967	East Germany	Günther Liebold	
1968	East Germany	Lothar Appler	
1969	East Germany	Klaus Ampler	
1970	East Germany	Dieter Grabe	
1971	East Germany	Michael Milde	
1972	East Germany	Michael Schiffner	
1973	East Germany	Michael Schiffner	
1974	East Germany	Wolfgang Lötzsch	
1975	East Germany	Eberhard Sanftleben	
1976	Belgium	André Van de Stehen	
1977	East Germany	Hans-Joachim Hartnick	
1978	East Germany	Detlef Bönisch	
1979	East Germany	Hans-Joachim Schippel	
1980	East Germany	Jörg Köhler	
1981	East Germany	Bodo Straubel	
1982	Soviet Union	Nikolai Kriwoschejew	
1983	East Germany	Wolfgang Lötzsch	
1984	East Germany	Bodo Straubel	
1985	East Germany	Frank Karraß	
1986	East Germany	Uwe Raab	
1987	East Germany	Olaf Ludwig	
1988	Soviet Union	Alexander Lopanow	
1989	East Germany	Uwe Stoltze	
1990	East Germany	Olaf Merkel	
1991	Germany	Frank Augustin	
1992	Germany	Frank Augustin	
1993	Germany	Jan Schaffrath	
1994	Germany	Martin Müller	
1995	Germany	Hagen Bernutz	
1996	Germany	Frank Augustin	
1997	Germany	Erik Zabel	
1998	Germany	Jan Ullrich	
1999	Germany	Lutz Lehmann	
2000	Germany	Steffen Radochla	
2008	Germany	Robert Bartko	
