= German National Road Race Championships =

National road cycling championship in Germany

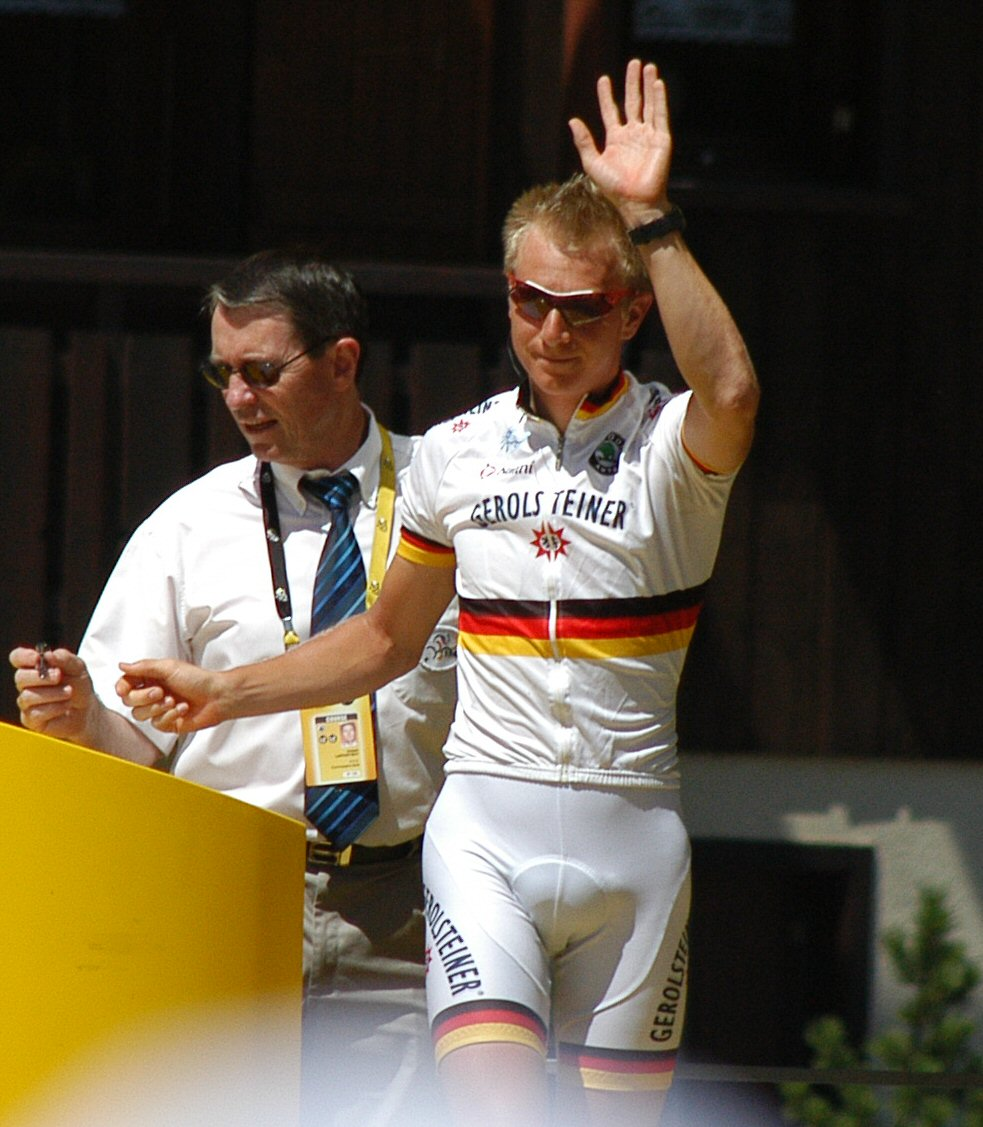
Fabian Wegmann (pictured at the 2007 Tour de France) is one of seven cyclists to have won three championships (in 2007, 2008, and 2012).

The German National Road Race Championship is a cycling race organized by the German Cycling Federation. The event was established in 1910, with the women's championship starting in 1968. No competitions were held in 1914 to 1918, 1926, 1927, 1929 to 1933, 1942 to 1945 and 1973. The winners of each event are awarded with a symbolic cycling jersey.

== Men ==
German National Road Race Championships – Men's elite race
Race details
- Region: Germany
- Discipline: Road bicycle racing
- Type: One-day

History
- First edition: 1910
- First winner: Karl Wittig
- Most wins: 7 riders with 3 wins (Note: The three-time winners are Erich Bautz, Winfried Bölke, Udo Bölts, Gregor Braun, André Greipel, Hans Junkermann and Fabian Wegmann.)
- Most recent: Felix Engelhardt

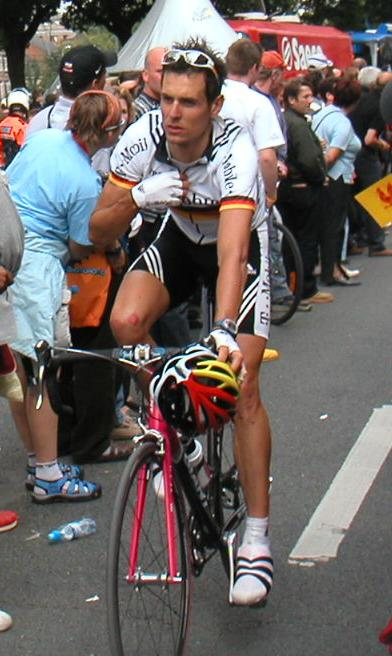
Andreas Klöden wearing the German champion's jersey (2004)

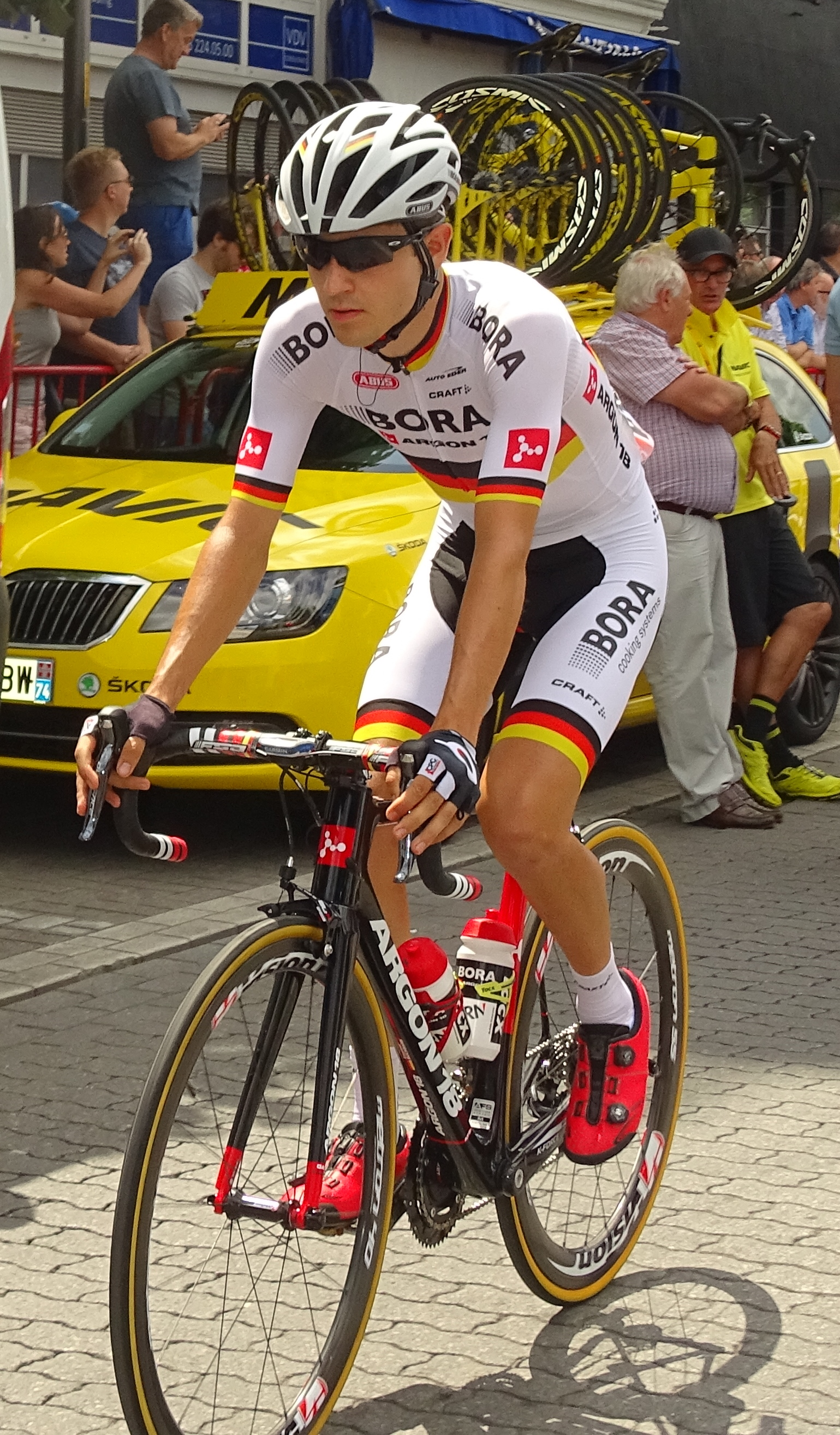
Emanuel Buchmann as German champion at the 2015 Tour de France

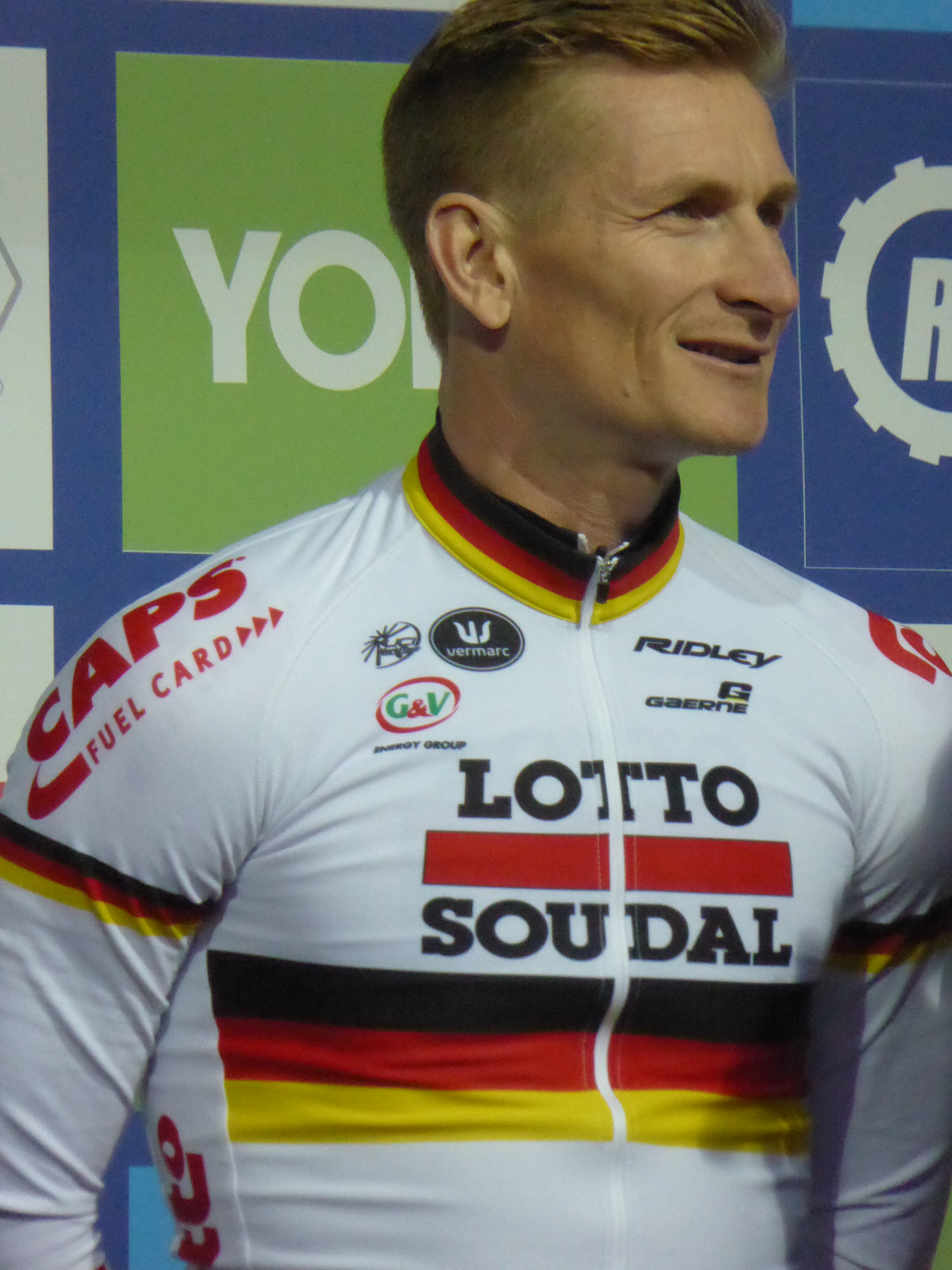
André Greipel (pictured at the 2016 Tour of Britain) won three championships (in 2013, 2014, and 2016).

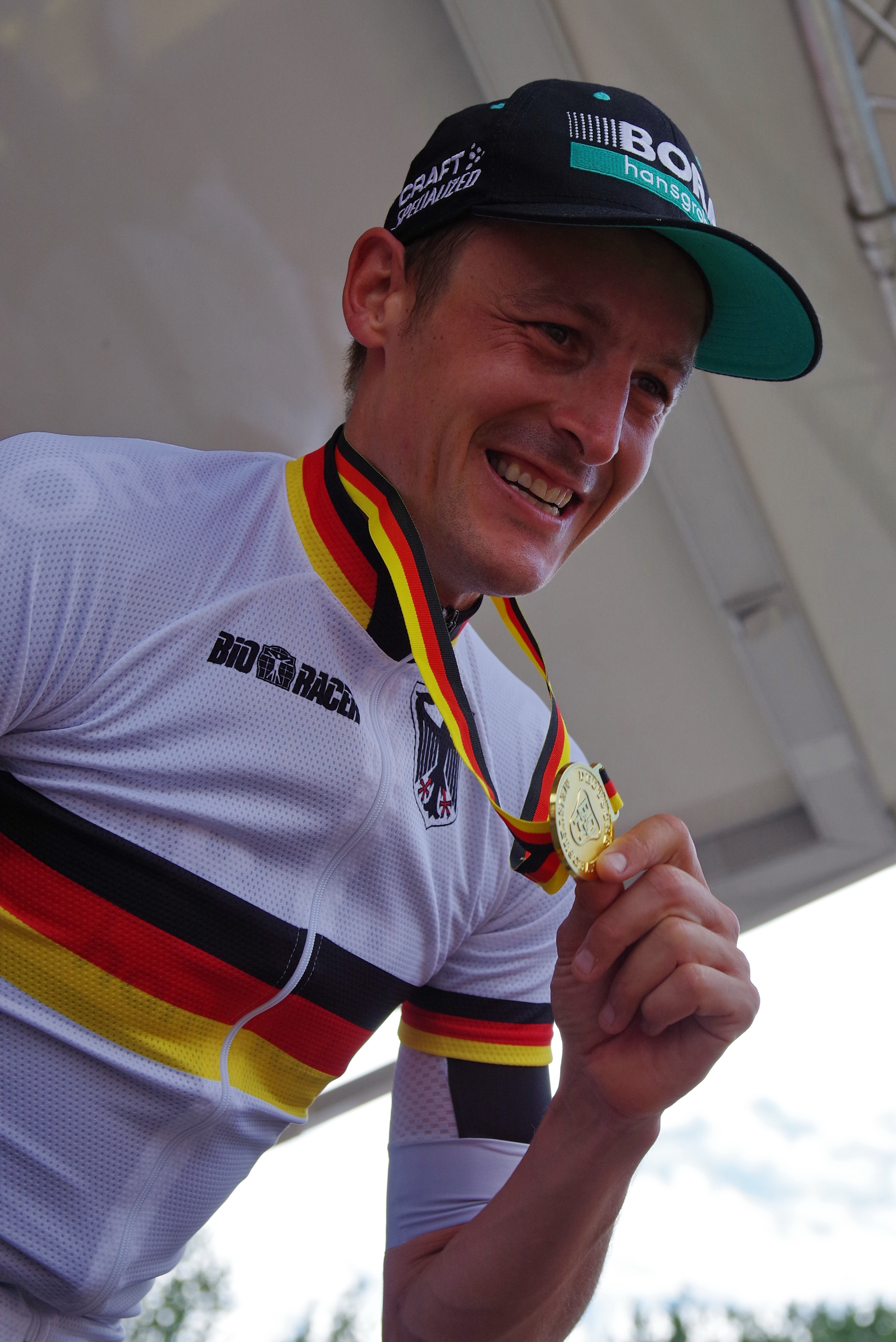
Marcus Burghardt on the podium after winning the 2017 championship road race

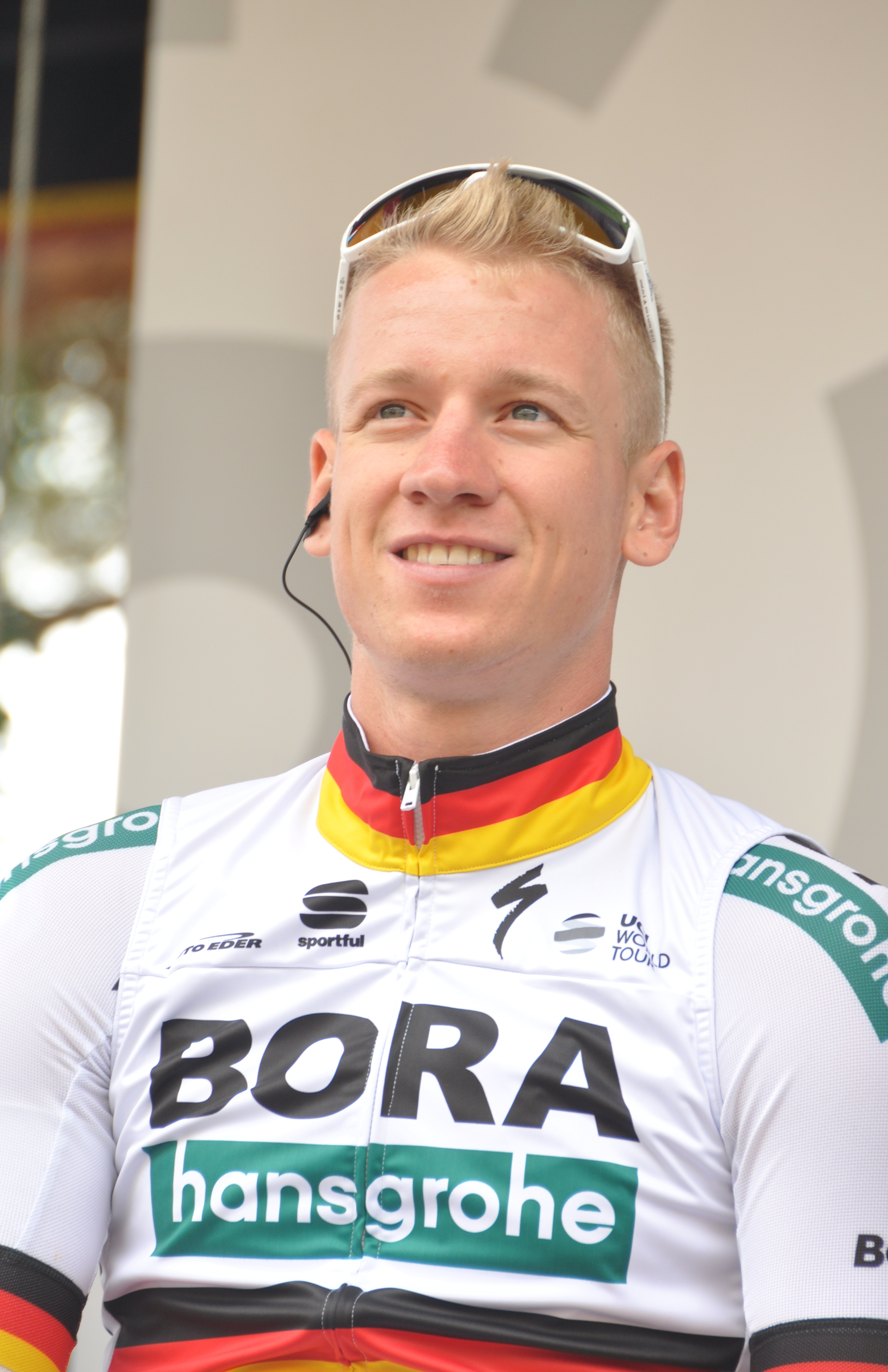
Pascal Ackermann wearing the champion's jersey at the 2018 Deutschland Tour

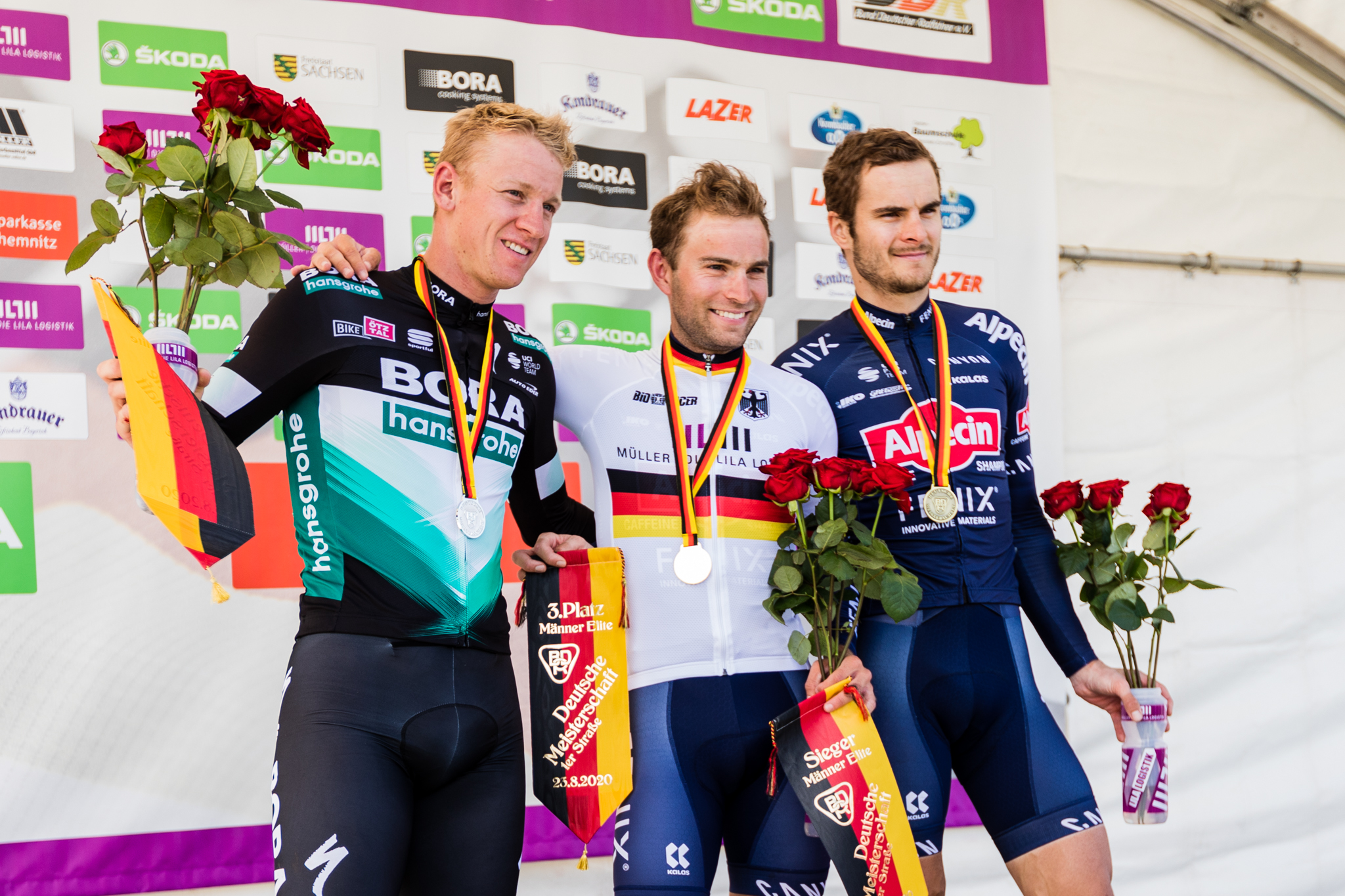
The podium after the 2020 Championship race, with Pascal Ackermann, winner Marcel Meisen, and Alexander Krieger

Year	Gold	Silver	Bronze
1910	Karl Wittig	Arno Ritter	Gustav Schönweiss
1911– 1912	Not held		
1913	Ernst Franz	Erich Aberger	Fritz Bauer
1914– 1918	Not held due to World War I		
1919	Richard Golle	Paul Koch	Wilhelm Franke
1920	Paul Koch	Adolf Huschke	Felix Manthey
1921	Adolf Huschke	Paul Koch	Fritz Fischer
1922	Richard Huschke	Adolf Huschke	Jean Steingass
1923	Richard Golle	Erich Aberger	Paul Kohl
1924	Paul Kohl	Karl Pfister	Gustav Nagel
1925	Richard Huschke	Paul Kroll	Paul Kohl
1926– 1927	Not held		
1928	Felix Manthey	Herbert Nebe	Bruno Wolke
1929– 1933	Not held		
1934	Kurt Stöpel	Ludwig Geyer	Anton Hodey
1935	Bruno Roth	Oskar Thierbach	Georg Stach
1936	Georg Umbenhauer	Erich Bautz	Emil Kijewski
1937	Erich Bautz	Emil Kijewski	Hermann Buse
1938	Jupp Arents	Bruno Roth	Fritz Scheller
1939	Walter Löber	Paul Langhoff	Albert Plappert
1940	Georg Stach	Herbert Gerber	Fritz Scheller
1941	Erich Bautz	Karl Weimer	Herbert Hackebeil
1942– 1945	Not held due to World War II		
1946	Karl Kittsteiner	Sepp Berger	Ludwig Hörmann
1947	Georg Voggenreiter	Karl Singer	Otto Ziege
1948	Otto Schenk	Heinrich Schwarzer	Georg Voggenreiter
1949	Otto Ziege	Erich Bautz	Günther Pankoke
1950	Erich Bautz	Hubert Schwarzenberg	Ludwig Hörmann
1951	Ludwig Hörmann	Heinrich Schwarzer	Gunther Bintner
1952	Ludwig Hörmann	Karl Weimer	Heinrich Schwarzer
1953	Heinz Müller	Hans Preiskeit	Matthias Pfannenmuller
1954	Hermann Schild	Günther Pankoke	Hubert Schwarzenberg
1955	Hans Preiskeit	Hans Junkermann	Hermann Schild
1956	Valentin Petry	Horst Backat	Heinz Müller
1957	Franz Reitz	Horst Tüller	Karl-Heinz Kramer
1958	Klaus Bugdahl	Hans Junkermann	Franz Reitz
1959	Hans Junkermann	Franz Reitz	Günther Debusmann
1960	Hans Junkermann	Horst Tüller	Lothar Friedrich
1961	Hans Junkermann	Dieter Puschel	Ludwig Troche
1962	Dieter Puschel	Rudi Altig	Horst Oldenburg
1963	Sigi Renz	Rolf Wolfshohl	Horst Oldenburg
1964	Rudi Altig	Winfried Bölke	Hans Junkermann
1965	Winfried Bölke	Peter Glemser	Hans Junkermann
1966	Winfried Bölke	Wolfgang Schulze	Wilfried Peffgen
1967	Winfried Bölke	Herbert Wilde	Hans Junkermann
1968	Rolf Wolfshohl	Winfried Bölke	Hans Junkermann
1969	Peter Glemser	Wilfried Peffgen	Ernst Streng
1970	Rudi Altig	Peter Glemser	Winfried Bölke
1971	Jürgen Tschan	Dieter Puschel	Dieter Kemper
1972	Wilfried Peffgen	Karl-Heinz Muddemann	Klaus Bugdahl
1973	Not held		
1974	Günter Haritz	Karl-Heinz Kuster	Wolfgang Schulze
1975	Dietrich Thurau	Günter Haritz	Dieter Puschel
1976	Dietrich Thurau	Jürgen Tschan	Günter Haritz
1977	Jürgen Kraft	Hans Hindelang	Jürgen Tschan
1978	Gregor Braun	Klaus-Peter Thaler	Hans-Peter Jakst
1979	Hans-Peter Jakst	Günter Haritz	Harald Maier
1980	Gregor Braun	Klaus-Peter Thaler	Dietrich Thurau
1981	Hans Neumayer	Hans-Peter Jakst	Hans Hindelang
1982	Hans Neumayer	Uwe Bolten	Stefan Schropfer
1983	Gregor Braun	Reimund Dietzen	Uwe Bolten
1984	Reimund Dietzen	Uwe Bolten	Gotz Heine
1985	Rolf Gölz	Gregor Braun	Peter Hilse
1986	Reimund Dietzen	Peter Hilse	Stefan Schropfer
1987	Peter Hilse	Volker Diehl	Andreas Kappes
1988	Hartmut Bölts	Andreas Kappes	—N/a
1989	Darius Kaiser	Peter Hilse	Peter Gansler
1990	Udo Bölts	Olaf Ludwig	Darius Kaiser
1991	Falk Boden	Kai Hundertmarck	Mario Kummer
1992	Heinrich Trumheller	Rolf Aldag	Kai Hundertmarck
1993	Bernd Gröne	Jens Heppner	Udo Bölts
1994	Jens Heppner	Christian Henn	Andreas Kappes
1995	Udo Bölts	Jens Heppner	Rolf Aldag
1996	Christian Henn	Jan Ullrich	Udo Bölts
1997	Jan Ullrich	Rolf Aldag	Erik Zabel
1998	Erik Zabel	Jan Ullrich	Jörg Jaksche
1999	Udo Bölts	Kai Hundertmarck	Erik Zabel
2000	Rolf Aldag	Steffen Wesemann	Udo Bölts
2001	Jan Ullrich	Erik Zabel	Christian Wegmann
2002	Danilo Hondo	Uwe Peschel	Erik Zabel
2003	Erik Zabel	Patrik Sinkewitz	Fabian Wegmann
2004	Andreas Klöden	Stefan Schumacher	Fabian Wegmann
2005	Gerald Ciolek	Robert Förster	Erik Zabel
2006	Dirk Müller	Matthias Kessler	Jens Voigt
2007	Fabian Wegmann	Patrik Sinkewitz	Christian Knees
2008	Fabian Wegmann	Erik Zabel	Gerald Ciolek
2009	Martin Reimer	Dominic Klemme	Roger Kluge
2010	Christian Knees	Steffen Radochla	Andreas Schillinger
2011	Robert Wagner	Gerald Ciolek	John Degenkolb
2012	Fabian Wegmann	Linus Gerdemann	Julian Kern
2013	André Greipel	Gerald Ciolek	John Degenkolb
2014	André Greipel	John Degenkolb	Phil Bauhaus
2015	Emanuel Buchmann	Nikias Arndt	Marcus Burghardt
2016	André Greipel	Max Walscheid	Marcel Kittel
2017	Marcus Burghardt	Emanuel Buchmann	John Degenkolb
2018	Pascal Ackermann	John Degenkolb	Max Walscheid
2019	Max Schachmann	Marcus Burghardt	Andreas Schillinger
2020	Marcel Meisen	Pascal Ackermann	Alexander Krieger
2021	Max Schachmann	Jonas Koch	Georg Zimmermann
2022	Nils Politt	Nikias Arndt	Simon Geschke
2023	Emanuel Buchmann	Nico Denz	Max Schachmann
2024	Marco Brenner	Florian Lipowitz	Kim Heiduk
2025	Georg Zimmermann	Felix Engelhardt	Anton Schiffer
2026	Felix Engelhardt	Lennart Jasch	Nico Denz

=== U23 ===
Year	Gold	Silver	Bronze
2009	Dominik Nerz	John Degenkolb	Julian Kern
2010	John Degenkolb	Michel Koch	Martin Gründer
2011	Fabian Schnaidt	Ralf Matzka	Rüdiger Selig
2012	Rick Zabel	Nikodemus Holler	Michel Koch
2013	Silvio Herklotz	Maximilian Werda	Raphael Freienstein
2014	Max Walscheid	Phil Bauhaus	Erik Bothe
2015	Nils Politt	Moritz Backofen	Nico Denz
2016	Pascal Ackermann	Konrad Geßner	Willi Willwohl
2017	Max Kanter	Simon Laib	Christian Koch
2018	Max Kanter	Jonas Rutsch	Aaron Grosser
2019	Leon Heinschke	Johannes Adamietz	Henrik Pakalski
2020	Not held due to the COVID-19 pandemic in Germany		
2021	Kim Heiduk	Michel Hessmann	Jakob Gessner
2022	Jannis Peter	Hannes Wilksch	Pirmin Benz
2023	Moritz Kretschy	Ole Theiler	Roman Duckert
2024	Niklas Behrens	Louis Leidert	Julian Borresch
2025	Mauro Brenner	Lukas Walzer	Paul Fietzke

== Women ==
German National Road Race Championships – Women's elite race
Race details
- Region: Germany
- Discipline: Road bicycle racing
- Type: One-day

History
- First edition: 1968
- First winner: Monika Mrklas
- Most wins: Beate Habetz (6 wins)
- Most recent: Franziska Koch

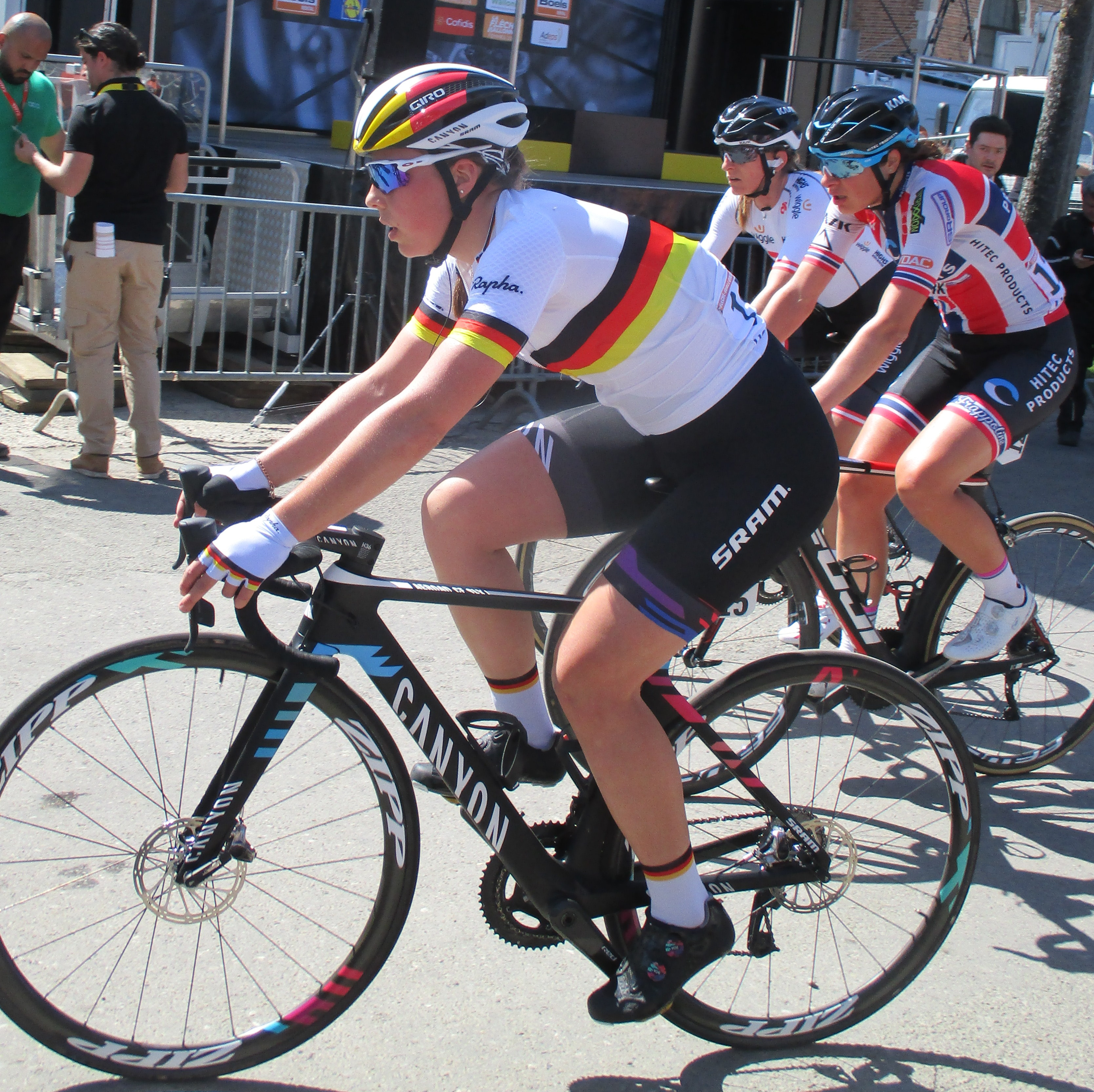
Lisa Klein wearing the German champion's jersey at the 2018 Flèche Wallonne

=== Road race ===
Year	Gold	Silver	Bronze
1968	Monika Mrklas	Uschi Burger	Gisela Nagel
1969	Not held		
1970	Ingrid Persohn	Uschi Burger	Doris Matwew
1971	Ingrid Persohn	Doris Matwew	Gisela Röhl
1972	Ursula Bürger	Gisela Röhl	Doris Matwew
1973	Gisela Röhl	Ingrid Persohn	Doris Matwew
1974	Gisela Röhl	Renate Schabbel	Gisela Nagel
1975	Ingrid Persohn	Gisela Röhl	Ingrid Hellfrisch
1976	Marianne Stuwe	Uta Rathmann	Gisela Röhl
1977	Beate Habetz	Marianne Stuwe	Uta Rathmann
1978	Beate Habetz	Uta Rathmann	Marianne Stuwe
1979	Beate Habetz	Marianne Stuwe	Uta Rathmann
1980	Beate Habetz	Gabi Habetz	Claudia Kaul
1981	Gabi Habetz	Marianne Stuwe	Beate Habetz
1982	Beate Habetz	Claudia Kaul	Claudia Lommatzsch
1983	Beate Habetz	Gabi Altweck	Birgit Strecke
1984	Sandra Schumacher	Ines Varenkamp	Gaby Prieler-Altweck
1985	Sandra Schumacher	Ute Enzenauer	Monika Diebel
1986	Ute Enzenauer	Angelika Darsch	Birgit Förstl
1987	Ute Enzenauer	Jutta Niehaus	Andrea Schütze
1988	Ines Varenkamp	Jutta Niehaus	Viola Paulitz
1989	Viola Paulitz	Jutta Niehaus	Petra Koch
1990	Heidi Metzger	Jutta Niehaus	Petra Rossner
1991	Heidi Metzger	Andrea Vranken-Schütze	Gaby Prieler-Altweck
1992	Viola Paulitz-Mueller	Silvia Lamparter	Monika Diebel
1993	Claudia Lehmann	Ina-Yoko Teutenberg	Sybille Lamparter
1994	Regina Schleicher	Claudia Lehmann	Elena Unruh
1995	Hanka Kupfernagel	Vera Hohlfeld	Ina-Yoko Teutenberg
1996	Viola Paulitz-Mueller	Vera Hohlfeld	Petra Rossner
1997	Hanka Kupfernagel	Vera Hohlfeld	Judith Arndt
1998	Hanka Kupfernagel	Judith Arndt	Sandra Missbach
1999	Hanka Kupfernagel	Petra Rossner	Kerstin Scheitle
2000	Hanka Kupfernagel	Kerstin Scheitle	Tanja Hennes-Schmidt
2001	Petra Rossner	Hanka Kupfernagel	Judith Arndt
2002	Judith Arndt	Petra Rossner	Regina Schleicher
2003	Trixi Worrack	Christiane Soeder	Tina Liebig
2004	Petra Rossner	Regina Schleicher	Angela Hennig-Brodtka
2005	Regina Schleicher	Tanja Hennes-Schmidt	Angela Hennig-Brodtka
2006	Claudia Häusler	Theresa Senff	Tina Liebig
2007	Luise Keller	Claudia Häusler	Angela Hennig-Brodtka
2008	Luise Keller	Eva Lutz	Tina Liebig
2009	Ina-Yoko Teutenberg	Marlen Jöhrend	Regina Schleicher
2010	Charlotte Becker	Judith Arndt	Trixi Worrack
2011	Ina-Yoko Teutenberg	Judith Arndt	Hanka Kupfernagel
2012	Judith Arndt	Charlotte Becker	Trixi Worrack
2013	Trixi Worrack	Elke Gebhardt	Romi Kasper
2014	Lisa Brennauer	Trixi Worrack	Martina Zwick
2015	Trixi Worrack	Claudia Lichtenberg	Lisa Brennauer
2016	Mieke Kröger	Lisa Brennauer	Jenny Hofmann
2017	Lisa Klein	Lisa Brennauer	Charlotte Becker
2018	Liane Lippert	Christa Riffel	Corinna Lechner
2019	Lisa Brennauer	Lisa Klein	Liane Lippert
2020	Lisa Brennauer	Charlotte Becker	Tanja Erath
2021	Lisa Brennauer	Liane Lippert	Ricarda Bauernfeind
2022	Liane Lippert	Ricarda Bauernfeind	Nadine Gill
2023	Liane Lippert	Kathrin Hammes	Romy Kasper
2024	Franziska Koch	Liane Lippert	Antonia Niedermaier
2025	Franziska Koch	Antonia Niedermaier	Rosa Maria Klöser
2026	Franziska Koch	Liane Lippert	Justyna Czapla

=== Mountain race ===
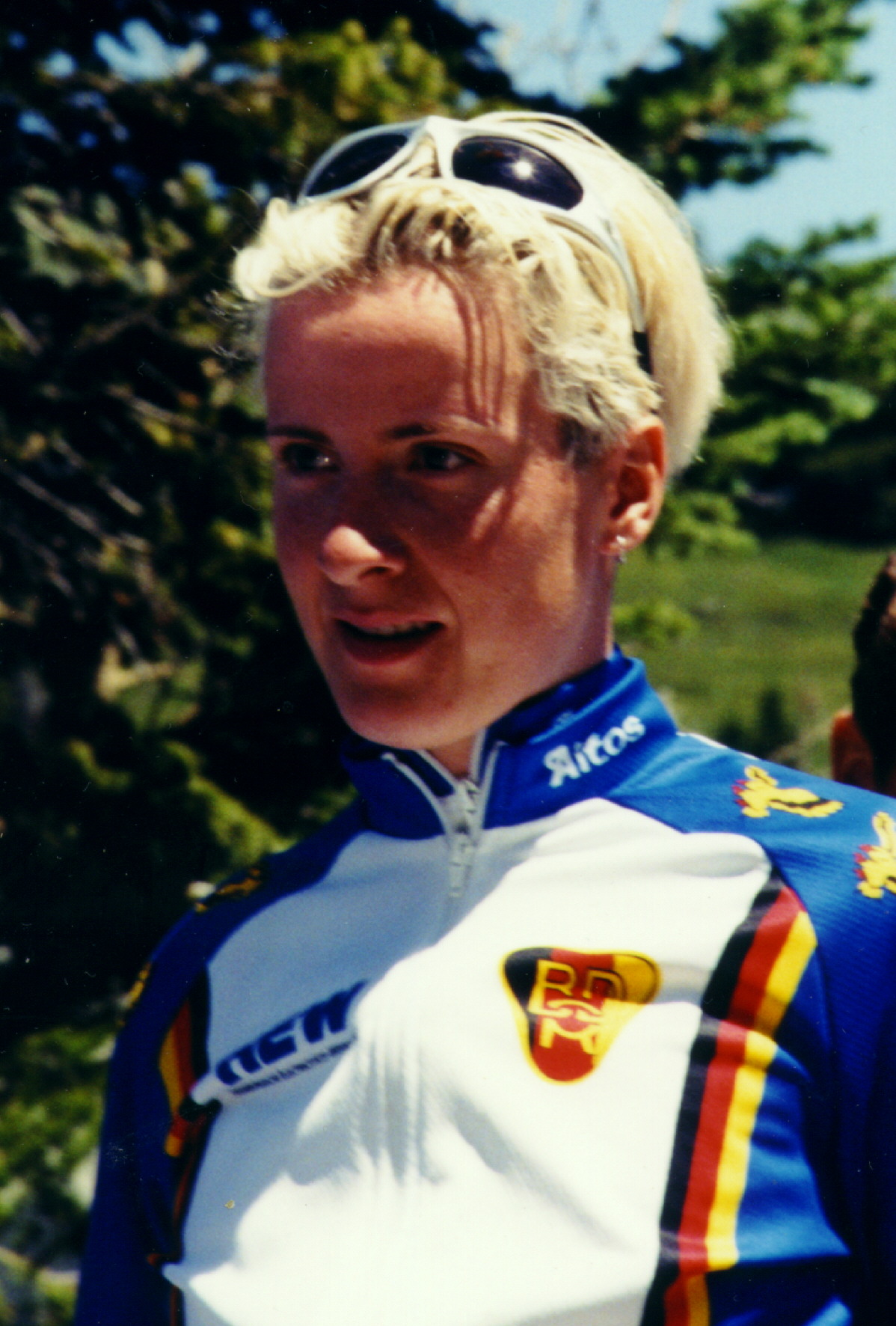
Judith Arndt - nine times winner of the mountain race

Year	Gold	Silver	Bronze
1994	Vera Hohlfeld	Hanka Kupfernagel	Cordula Gruber
1995	Hanka Kupfernagel	Judith Arndt	Petra Rossner
1996	Hanka Kupfernagel	Judith Arndt	Vera Hohlfeld
1997	Hanka Kupfernagel	Judith Arndt	Ina-Yoko Teutenberg
1998	Judith Arndt	Jacqueline Brabenetz	Mandy Hampel
1999	Judith Arndt	Petra Rossner	Bettina Schoeke
2000	Hanka Kupfernagel	Bettina Schöke	Ina-Yoko Teutenberg
2001	Judith Arndt	Bettina Schöke	Hanka Kupfernagel
2002	Hanka Kupfernagel	Trixi Worrack	Tina Liebig
2003	Judith Arndt	Christiane Soeder	Anke Wichmann
2004	Judith Arndt	Trixi Worrack	Petra Rossner
2005	Judith Arndt	Trixi Worrack	Madeleine Sandig
2006	Charlotte Becker	Madeleine Sandig	Ina-Yoko Teutenberg
2007	Hanka Kupfernagel	Charlotte Becker	Judith Arndt
2008	Hanka Kupfernagel	Judith Arndt	Charlotte Becker
2009	Trixi Worrack	Judith Arndt	Ina-Yoko Teutenberg
2010	Judith Arndt	Charlotte Becker	Hanka Kupfernagel
2011	Judith Arndt	Charlotte Becker	Ina-Yoko Teutenberg
2012	Judith Arndt	Trixi Worrack	Ina-Yoko Teutenberg
2013	Lisa Brennauer	Trixi Worrack	Esther Fennel
2014	Lisa Brennauer	Trixi Worrack	Charlotte Becker
2015	Mieke Kröger	Lisa Brennauer	Trixi Worrack

== See also ==
- German National Time Trial Championships
- National road cycling championships
