= 1952 UCI Road World Championships – Men's road race =

Men's Individual Road Race
1952 UCI Road World Championships
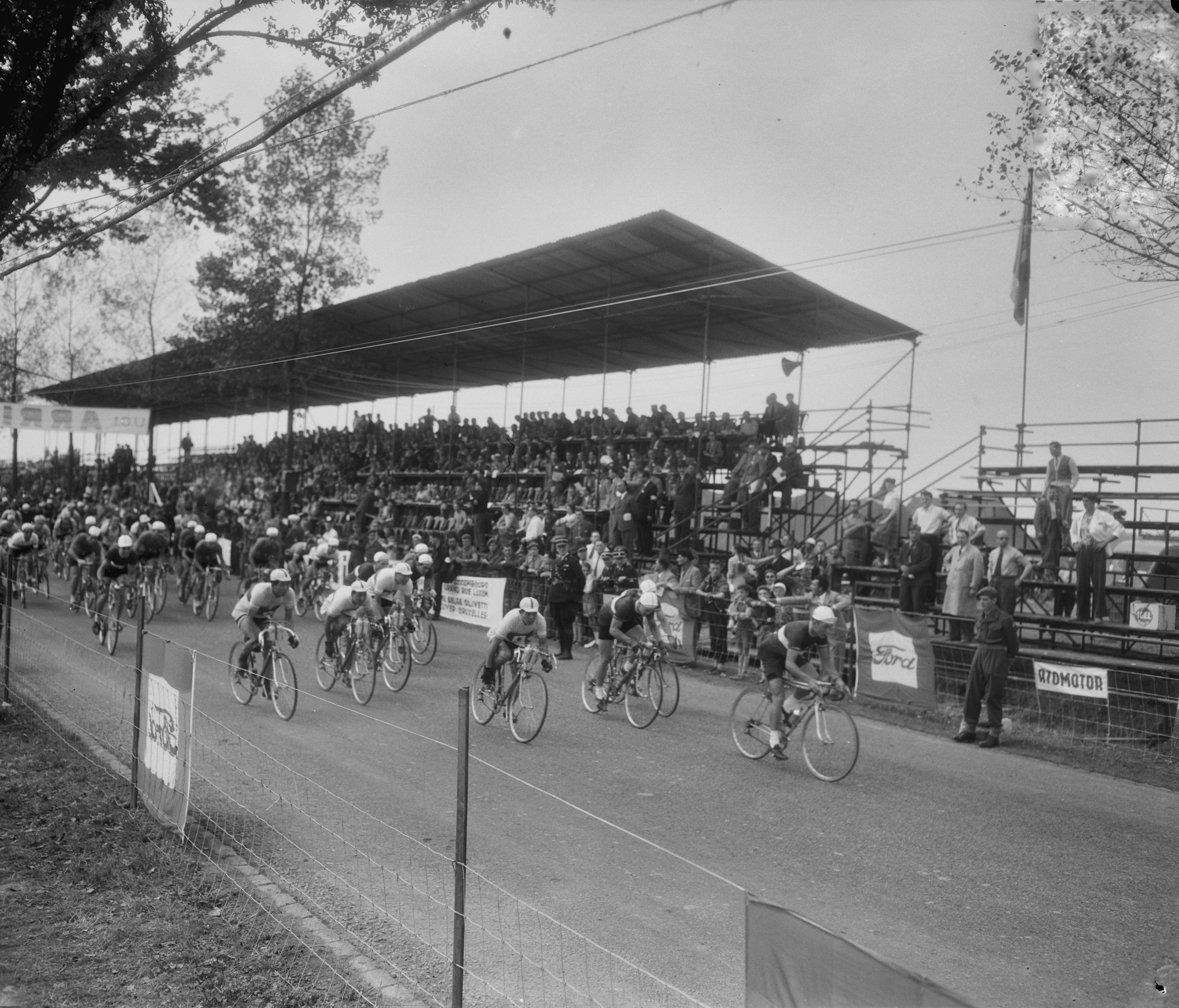
- Start of the 1952 World Championships road race

Race details
- Dates: 24 August 1952
- Stages: 1
- Distance: 280 km (174.0 mi)
- Winning time: 7h 05' 51"

Results
	Winner	Heinz Müller (FRG)	(West Germany)
	Second	Gottfried Weilenmann (SUI)	(Switzerland)
	Third	Ludwig Hörmann (FRG)	(West Germany)

The men's road race at the 1952 UCI Road World Championships was the 19th edition of the event. The race took place on Sunday 24 August 1952 in Luxembourg. The race was won by Heinz Müller of West Germany.

== Final classification ==
General classification (1–10)

Rank	Rider	Time
1st place, gold medalist(s)	Heinz Müller (FRG)	7h 05' 51"
2nd place, silver medalist(s)	Gottfried Weilenmann (SUI)	+ 0"
3rd place, bronze medalist(s)	Ludwig Hörmann (FRG)	+ 0"
4	Fiorenzo Magni (ITA)	+ 0"
5	Robert Varnajo (FRA)	+ 0"
6	Henk Faanhof (NED)	+ 0"
7	Jean Baldassari (FRA)	+ 0"
8	Louison Bobet (FRA)	+ 0"
9	Rik Van Steenbergen (BEL)	+ 0"
10	Antonio Bevilacqua (ITA)	+ 0"
