= Habetz =

Habetz is a surname. Notable people with the surname include:

- Alyson Habetz, American softball coach
- Beate Habetz (born 1961), German cyclist
- Gabi Habetz, German cyclist
