= Udo Bölts =

German cyclist (born 1966)

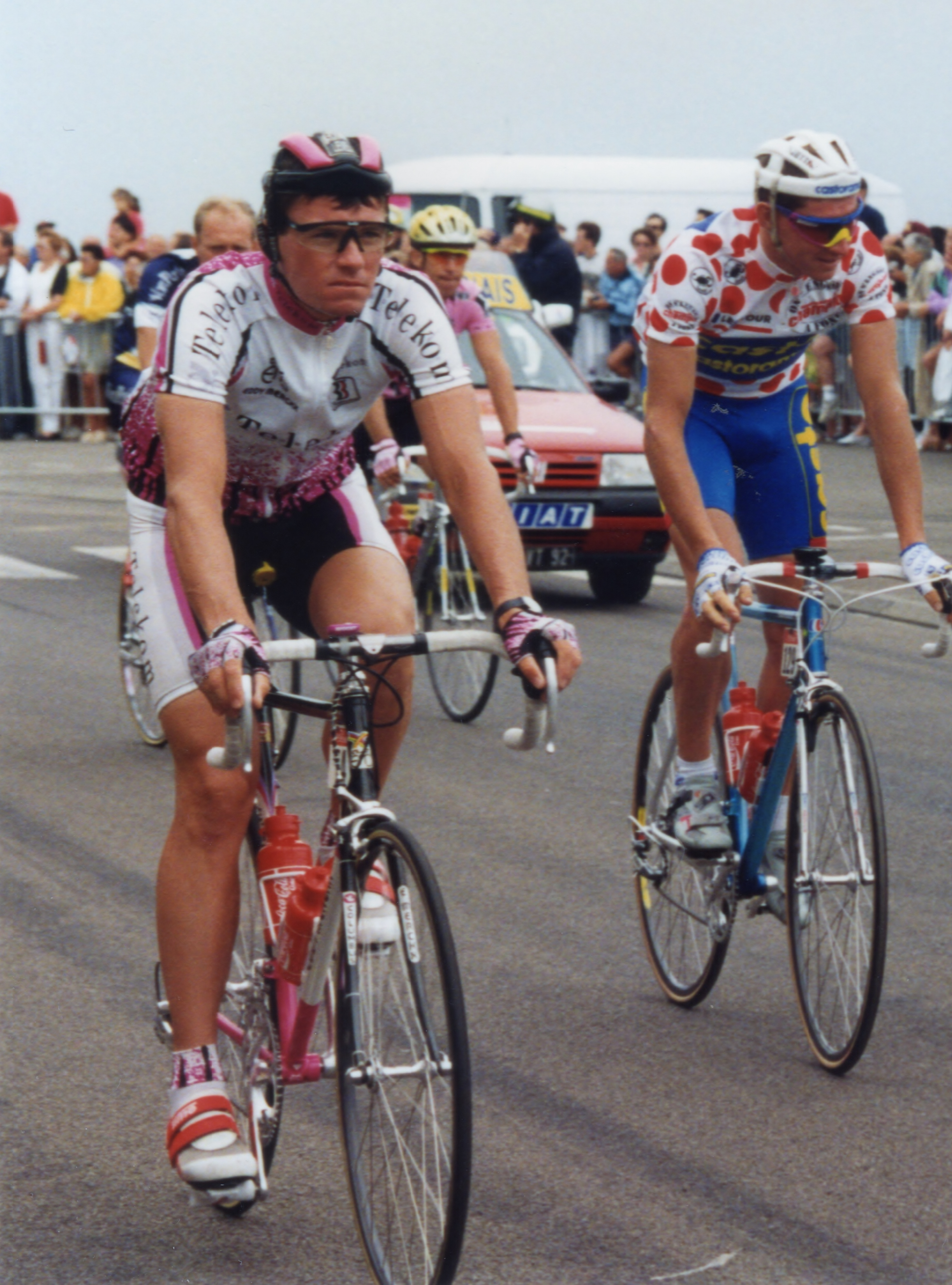
- Bölts (left) at the 1993 Tour de France

Personal information
- Born: 10 August 1966 (age 60) Heltersberg, West Germany
- Height: 1.79 m (5 ft 10 1/2 in)
- Weight: 73 kg (161 lb; 11 st 7 lb)

Cycling career
- Sport: Cycling
- Current team: Retired
- Discipline: Road
- Role: Rider

Professional teams
- 1989–2002: Stuttgart–Merckx–Gonsor
- 2003: Gerolsteiner

Managerial team
- 2004–2007: Gerolsteiner

Major wins
- Grand Tours Giro d'Italia 1 individual stage (1992) Stage races Critérium du Dauphiné (1997) One-day races and Classics National Road Race Championship (1990, 1995, 1999) Clásica de San Sebastián (1996)

Udo Bölts (born 10 August 1966) is a retired German racing cyclist, the brother of Hartmut Bölts. Bölts confessed publicly in 2007 to having used EPO and growth hormones in 1996 and 1997.

== Biography ==
Bölts was born in Heltersberg and began his professional career in 1989 with Stuttgart–Merckx–Gonsor, from which Team Telekom were formed in 1991.

From 1992 to 2003, Bölts took part in 12 consecutive Tours de France, arriving in Paris on every occasion, both of which feats are German records. These records have since been surpassed by Jens Voigt. His best placing in the hardest stage race in the world was in 1994, when he was ninth. In 1996 and 1997, he was an important helper of his Telekom teammates and eventual winners of the Tour, Bjarne Riis and Jan Ullrich. During the 1997 Tour Stage 18 in the Vosges mountains, he was noted for the words he shouted to Ullrich when the latter was about to crack: Quäl dich, du Sau! (force yourself, you sod!). He used this as title for his autobiography, and many German language bike riders adopted it.

After Bölts had taken part in the year 2000 Ironman Hawaii event with little preparation, his team chief of many years, Walter Godefroot, said: "Bölts is strong, he never breaks down".

Some of his victories include three German road national titles (1990, 1995 and 1999), the Clásica de San Sebastián in 1996 or a stage win at the 1992 Giro d'Italia. He also is the only German rider to have won the Dauphiné Libéré, which he did in 1997, a year in which he was also fourth in the World Cycling Championships.

For his last season as a professional, Bölts moved to Gerolsteiner. After he retired in 2004, he became one of the team's directeurs sportif, and was responsible for race preparations, strategies and contacts with other teams and cyclists. During the Tour de France 2006, he was an assistant commentator for German TV channel ZDF.

In the wake of the 2007 Team T-Mobile scandal Bölts confessed publicly on 23 May, having used EPO and growth hormones in preparation for the Tour the France 1996, continuing with the practise in 1997. In consequence of this Bölts resigned as the sports director of Gerolsteiner on 24 May 2007.

== Major results ==
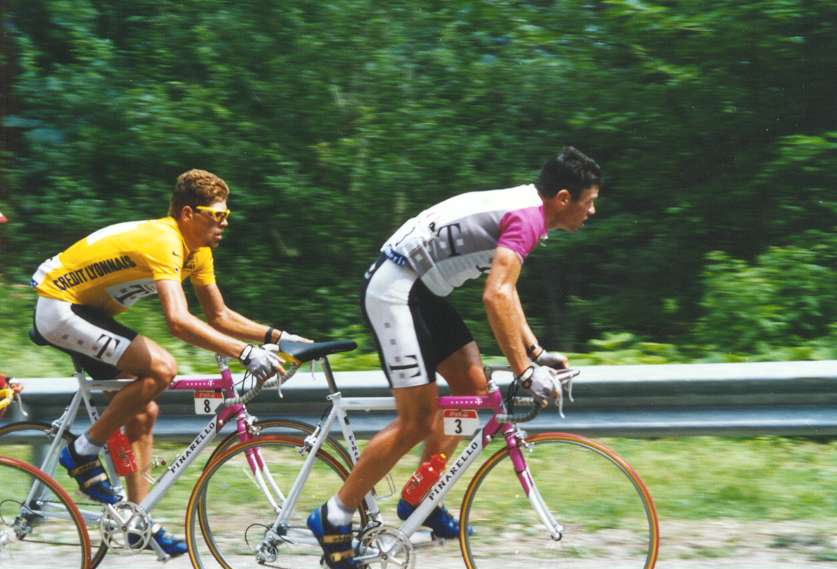
Bölts (right) leading Jan Ullrich during the 1997 Tour de France

1987
6th Overall Grand Prix Guillaume Tell
1989
3rd Overall Herald Sun Tour

1st Stage 2

1990
1st Road race, National Road Championships
1st Overall Herald Sun Tour
2nd Grand Prix de Cannes
6th Grand Prix de Cholet – Pays de Loire
10th Overall Tour Méditerranéen
1991
3rd Overall Herald Sun Tour
6th Overall Nissan Classic
8th Overall Tour Méditerranéen
10th Overall Tour de Suisse
1992
1st Stage 19 Giro d'Italia
1st Stage 3 Tour of the Basque Country
4th Grand Prix Eddy Merckx
6th GP Ouest–France
7th Giro di Lombardia
9th Coppa Bernocchi
1993
3rd Overall Herald Sun Tour
3rd Omloop van de Westkust
6th Telekom Grand Prix (with Jens Heppner)
9th Overall Tirreno–Adriatico
1994
1st Rund um Köln
1st Omloop van de Westkust
Herald Sun Tour

1st Stages 8 & 9

2nd Grand Prix de Wallonie
6th Overall Setmana Catalana de Ciclisme
7th Telekom Grand Prix (with Andreas Kappes)
8th Giro di Lombardia
9th Overall Tour de France
9th Overall Tour of the Basque Country
1995
1st Road race, National Road Championships
6th Telekom Grand Prix (with Jens Heppner)
1996
1st Clásica de San Sebastián
2nd Overall Vuelta a Castilla y León

1st Stage 5

3rd Road race, National Road Championships
6th Overall Grand Prix du Midi Libre
7th Overall Tour de Suisse

1st Stage 7

7th Telekom Grand Prix (with Christian Henn)
9th Overall Critérium du Dauphiné Libéré
9th Klasika Primavera
10th Overall Regio-Tour
1997
1st Overall Critérium du Dauphiné Libéré

1st Mountains classification

1st Grand Prix of Aargau Canton
1st Stage 5 Euskal Bizikleta
3rd Overall Vuelta a Castilla y León
4th Road race, UCI Road World Championships
4th Breitling Grand Prix (with Christian Henn)
7th Overall Grand Prix Guillaume Tell
8th Rund um den Henninger-Turm
1998
1st Grand Prix de Wallonie
1st Breitling Grand Prix (with Christian Henn)
2nd Klasika Primavera
5th Overall Grand Prix Guillaume Tell
7th Road race, National Road Championships
8th Rund um den Henninger-Turm
9th Clásica de San Sebastián
10th Road race, UCI Road World Championships
10th Tre Valli Varesine
1999
1st Road race, National Road Championships
6th La Flèche Wallonne
6th Klasika Primavera
9th Liège–Bastogne–Liège
10th Overall Tour of the Basque Country
10th Overall Grand Prix du Midi Libre
10th Breitling Grand Prix (with Christian Henn)
2000
1st Stage 1 (TTT) Tour de Suisse
2nd Klasika Primavera
3rd Overall Deutschland Tour

1st Stage 3

6th Rund um Köln
2001
7th Rund um den Henninger-Turm
8th Overall Deutschland Tour
9th Klasika Primavera
2003
7th Overall Bayern-Rundfahrt

=== Grand Tour general classification results timeline ===
Grand Tour	1990	1991	1992	1993	1994	1995	1996	1997	1998	1999	2000	2001	2002	2003
Giro d'Italia	—	—	31	33	18	46	—	—	—	—	—	—	—	—
Tour de France	—	—	35	25	9	38	14	21	21	40	42	51	48	61
/ Vuelta a España	53	17	—	—	—	—	—	—	—	—	—	—	—	—

Legend
—	Did not compete
DNF	Did not finish

== See also ==
- List of doping cases in cycling
- List of sportspeople sanctioned for doping offences
