= GP Union Dortmund =

German cycling race

Grand Prix Union Dortmund
Race details
- Date: May, June, August, September
- Region: North Rhine-Westphalia, Germany
- English name: GP Union Dortmund
- Local name(s): Großer Preis der Dortmunder Union-Brauerei (in German)
- Discipline: Road
- Competition: Cat. 1.1
- Type: One-day race

History
- First edition: 1962
- Editions: 23
- Final edition: 1984
- First winner: Piet Damen (NED)
- Most wins: Eddy Merckx (BEL); Theo De Rooij (NED); (2 wins)
- Final winner: Gérard Velscholten (NED)

The Grand Prix Union Dortmund was a German cycling race organized for the last time in 1984.

The course was between 130 and 172 km, with Dortmund as both start and finish place.

The competition's roll of honor includes the successes of Eddy Merckx, Hennie Kuiper and Patrick Sercu. Merckx won two editions and finished two times as third.

Only two German riders, Rudi Altig and Dietrich Thurau, managed to win the race. For a few years, a parallel race for amateurs was also organized.

== Winners ==
| Year | Winner | Second | Third |
|---|---|---|---|
| 1962 | (Netherlands) Piet Damen | (Netherlands) Jaap Kersten | (Netherlands) Coen Niesten |
| 1963 | (Belgium) Willy Vannitsen | (France) Jacques Anquetil | (West Germany) Horst Oldenburg |
| 1964 | (West Germany) Rudi Altig | (West Germany) Hans Junkermann | (Netherlands) Peter Post |
| 1965 | (Netherlands) Jan Hugens | (Belgium) Jan Lauwers | (Netherlands) Wim de Jager |
| 1966 | (Netherlands) Wim de Jager | (West Germany) Peter Glemser | (Italy) Guido De Rosso |
| 1967 | (Belgium) Jean-Baptiste Claes | (West Germany) Winfried Boelke | (Netherlands) Peter Post |
| 1968 | (Belgium) Erik De Vlaeminck | (Belgium) Roger Legrange | (Belgium) Frans Verbeeck |
| 1969 | (Belgium) Julien Stevens | (West Germany) Winfried Boelke | (Belgium) Walter Godefroot |
| 1970 | (Belgium) Eddy Merckx | (Belgium) Noël Vanclooster | (Belgium) Maurice Dury |
| 1971 | (Belgium) Herman Van Springel | (Belgium) Julien Stevens | (Belgium) Eddy Merckx |
| 1972 | (Belgium) Eddy Merckx | (West Germany) Wilfried Peffgen | (Netherlands) Gerben Karstens |
| 1973 | (Belgium) Antoine Houbrechts | (Belgium) Willy Teirlinck | (Belgium) Eddy Merckx |
| 1974 | (Netherlands) Hennie Kuiper | (Belgium) Joseph Bruyère | (Belgium) Joseph Huysmans |
| 1975 | (Belgium) Rik Van Linden | (Belgium) André Dierickx | (West Germany) Dietrich Thurau |
| 1976 | (Belgium) André Dierickx | (West Germany) Dietrich Thurau | (Switzerland) Roland Schar |
| 1977 | (West Germany) Dietrich Thurau | (Belgium) Jozef Jacobs | (Belgium) Frank Hoste |
| 1978 | (Belgium) Gery Verlinden | (Belgium) Daniel Willems | (Belgium) Alfons De Bal |
| 1979 | (Belgium) Patrick Sercu | (Republic of Ireland) Sean Kelly | (Belgium) Willem Peeters |
| 1980 | (Norway) Jostein Wilmann | (Switzerland) Bruno Wolfer | (Italy) Roberto Ceruti |
| 1981 | (Netherlands) Theo de Rooy | (West Germany) Gregor Braun | (Switzerland) Jean-Marie Grezet |
| 1982 | (Netherlands) Ad Wijnands | (Netherlands) Adri van der Poel | (New Zealand) Eric McKenzie |
| 1983 | (Netherlands) Theo de Rooy | (Netherlands) Gerard Veldscholten | (Netherlands) Adri van der Poel |
| 1984 | (Netherlands) Gerard Veldscholten | (Netherlands) Theo de Rooy | (Belgium) Louis Luyten |
