= Gottfried Weilenmann (cyclist, born 1920) =

Swiss cyclist (1920–2018)

Gottfried Weilenmann, Jr.
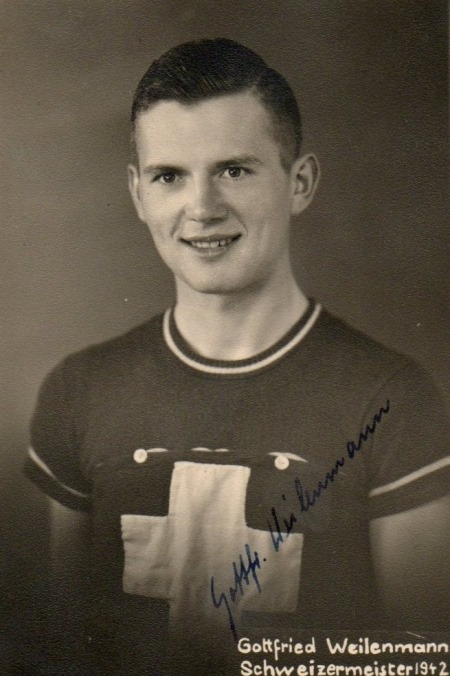

Personal information
- Born: 29 March 1920 Amriswil, Switzerland
- Died: 14 November 2018 (aged 98)

Cycling career
- Sport: Cycling
- Current team: Retired
- Discipline: Road
- Role: Rider

Professional teams
- 1946: Individual
- 1947: Rico
- 1948: Sala
- 1948: Stucchi
- 1949–1950: Wolf
- 1950: Colomb-Manera
- 1950–1952: Guerra-Ursus
- 1951: Tigra
- 1951–1952: Cilo

Gottfried Weilenmann (29 March 1920 – 14 November 2018) was a Swiss cyclist. Professional 1945 to 1952, he won the Tour de Suisse in 1949 and the Swiss National Road Race Championships in 1952. In the latter year, he placed second in the UCI World Road Racing Championships road behind Heinz Müller.

His brother Leo was also a professional rider during the same period as he was. His father, Gottfried was part of the Swiss team pursuit at the 1924 Olympic Games.

== Major results ==
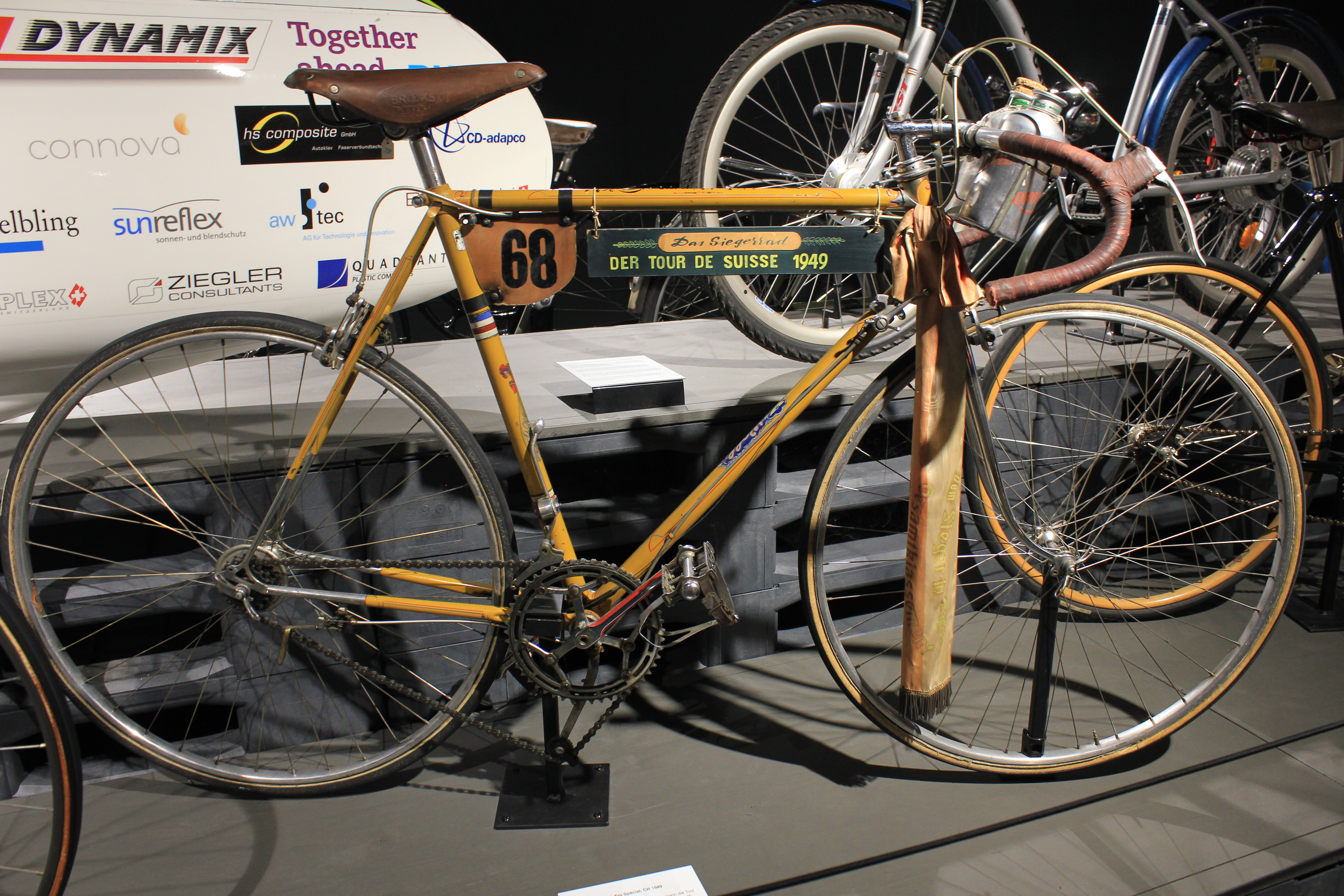
Weilenmann used this bike to win Tour de Suisse in 1949

1942
1st Road race, National Amateur Road Championships
1944
2nd À Travers Lausanne
1945
2nd Overall Circuito del Norte
2nd À Travers Lausanne
3rd Tour du Lac Léman
1946
2nd Overall Volta a Catalunya
3rd Zurich–Lausanne
1947
8th Overall Tour de Romandie
10th GP du Midi Libre
1949
1st Overall Tour de Suisse
2nd Giro del Ticino
2nd Tour du Nord-Ouest de la Suisse
3rd Züri-Metzgete
1950
3rd Road race, National Road Championships
1952
1st Road race, National Road Championships
2nd Road race, UCI Road World Championships
5th La Flèche Wallonne
8th Liège–Bastogne–Liège

== Grand Tour Results ==
=== Tour de France ===
- 1947: 17th
- 1950: 39th
- 1950: 50th
- 1951: 50th
- 1952: 12th

=== Giro d'Italia ===
- 1950: 45th
- 1952: 39th
