= Christian Wegmann =

German bicycle racer (born 1976)

Personal information
- Born: 22 February 1976 (age 50) Münster, Germany

Cycling career
- Sport: Cycling
- Current team: Retired
- Discipline: Road
- Role: Rider

Professional teams
- 1997–1999: Die Continentale-Olympia
- 2000–2002: Saeco–Valli & Valli

Christian Wegmann (born 22 February 1976 in Münster) is a German former cyclist.

== Palmares ==
1998
1st Omloop der Kempen
1st Stage 5 Tour of Japan
1999
3rd Overall Deutschland Tour
2001
1st Rund um die Hainleite
1st Stage 2 Tour of Austria
3rd National Road Race Championships
2002
1st Stage 4 Bayern Rundfahrt
2nd Overall Uniqa Classic
