= Varenkamp =

Varenkamp is a surname. Notable people with the surname include:

- Ines Varenkamp (born 1963), German former professional racing cyclist
- Rusty Varenkamp, American Christian musician
