= Enzenauer =

Enzenauer is a German surname. Notable people with the surname include:

- Peter Enzenauer (1878–1951), Canadian politician
- Ute Enzenauer (born 1965), West German cyclist
