= Voggenreiter =

Voggenreiter may refer to:

- Georg Voggenreiter (1912-1986), German racing cyclist
- Voggenreiter Verlag, a German music publisher
