= Heidi Metzger =

German racing cyclist

Cycling career
- Sport: Cycling
- Role: Rider

Heidi Metzger is a German former professional racing cyclist. She won the German National Road Race Championship in 1990 and 1991.
