= Otto Ziege =

German cyclist

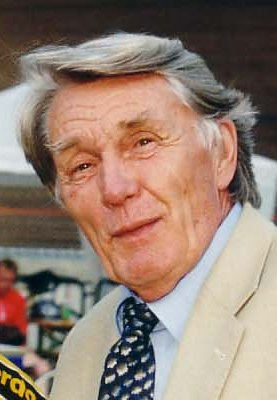
- Ziege in 2004

Personal information
- Born: 14 June 1926 Berlin, Germany
- Died: 8 November 2014 (aged 88)

Cycling career
- Sport: Cycling
- Role: Rider

Otto Ziege (14 June 1926 – 8 November 2014) was a former German racing cyclist. He won the German National Road Race in 1949.
