= Marianne Stuwe =

German cyclist

Personal information
- Born: 23 September 1955 (age 71)

Cycling career
- Sport: Cycling
- Role: Rider

Marianne Stuwe (born 23 September 1955) is a German former professional racing cyclist. She won the German National Road Race Championship in 1976.
