= Valentin Petry =

German cyclist

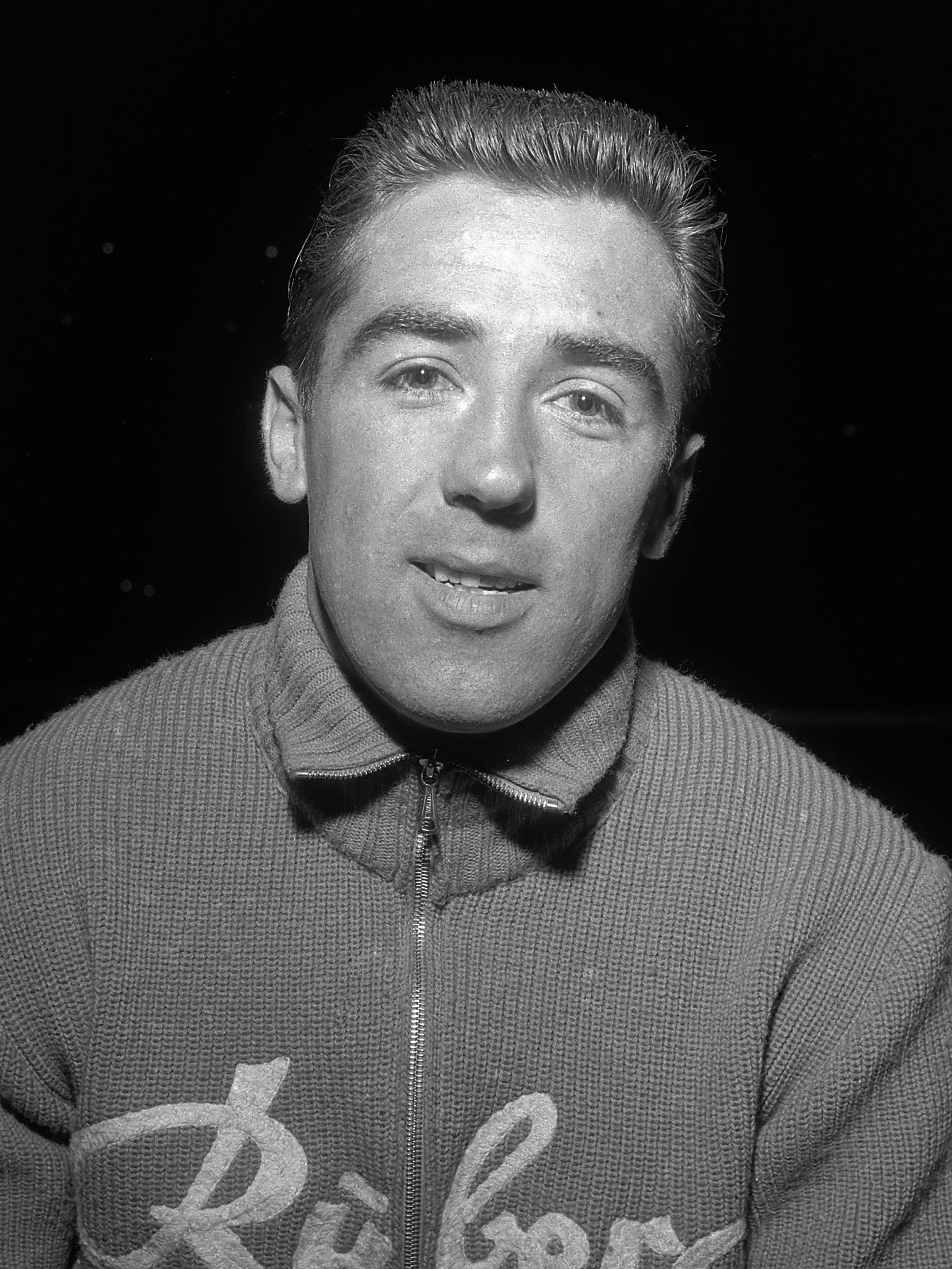
- Valentin Petry (1957)

Personal information
- Born: 5 May 1928 Hochheim am Main, Germany
- Died: 25 May 2016 (aged 88)

Cycling career
- Sport: Cycling
- Role: Rider

Valentin Petry (5 May 1928 – 25 May 2016) was a German racing cyclist. He won the German National Road Race in 1956.
