= Gisela Röhl =

German cyclist

Cycling career
- Sport: Cycling
- Role: Rider

Major wins
- 2x German National Road Race Championships

Gisela Röhl is a German former professional racing cyclist. She won the German National Road Race Championship in 1973 and 1974, first runners up twice; in 1972 and 1975, and second runners up twice; in 1971 and 1976.
