= Jens Heppner =

German cyclist (born 1964)

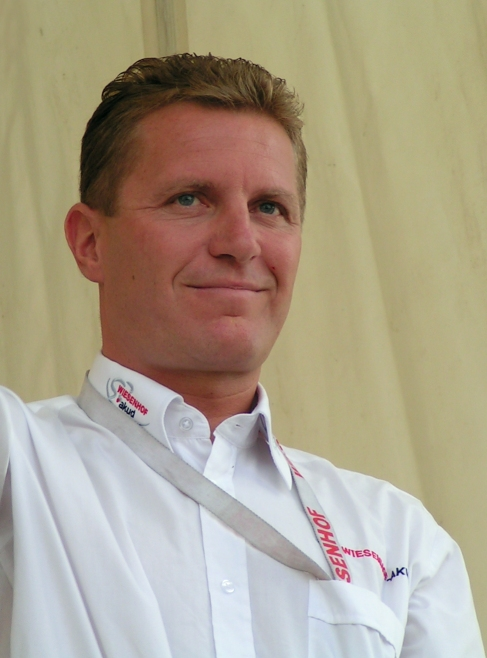
- Heppner in 2006

Personal information
- Full name: Jens Heppner
- Nickname: Heppe
- Born: 23 December 1964 (age 61) Gera, East Germany
- Height: 1.72 m (5 ft 8 in)
- Weight: 69 kg (152 lb; 10 st 12 lb)

Cycling career
- Sport: Cycling
- Current team: Retired
- Discipline: Road
- Role: Rider; Manager

Professional teams
- 1991: Panasonic–Sportlife
- 1992–2002: Team Telekom
- 2003–2005: Team Wiesenhof

Managerial teams
- 2006–2007: Wiesenhof–AKUD
- 2011–2013: Team NetApp

Major wins
- German National Road Race Championship (1994); Deutschland Tour (1999); Tour de France, 1 stage

Jens Heppner (born 23 December 1964) is a German former road bicycle racer. He wore the pink jersey as leader of the general classification during the 2002 Giro d'Italia. Although he rode for Telekom during ten years, he has consistently denied ever having doped.

His name was on the list of doping tests published by the French Senate on 24 July 2013 that were collected during the 1998 Tour de France and found positive for EPO when retested in 2004. He won the German National Road Race in 1994. After his career, he worked in his own company in Hergenrath (Germany).

== Major results ==
1982
World Junior Team Time Trial Championship
1986
7th Overall GP Tell
1987
1st Overall Hessen Rundfahrt
1st Overall Sachsen Tour
1990
7th Overall Circuit de la Sarthe
1992
10th Overall Tour de France
1993
3rd Amstel Gold Race
4th Züri-Metzgete
9th Rund um den Henninger Turm
1994
1st Overall Tour du Limousin

1st Stage 1

1st Road race, National Road Championships
3rd Rund um Köln
3rd GP Ouest–France
1995
1st Stage 2 Tour du Limousin
2nd Rund um den Henninger Turm
9th Overall Route du Sud
10th Subida a Urkiola
1996
2nd Overall Regio-Tour

1st Stage 1

2nd Rund um den Henninger Turm
2nd GP Rik Van Steenbergen
9th Amstel Gold Race
1997
1st Stage 5 Critérium du Dauphiné Libéré
3rd HEW Cyclassics
1998
1st Stage 3 Tour de France
3rd Overall Tirreno–Adriatico
3rd Luk-Cup Bühl
1999
1st Overall Deutschland Tour
1st Rund um Köln
2000
1st Hof
1st Rund um den Pfaffenteich
3rd Rund um Köln
3rd Rund um den Henninger Turm
6th Overall Deutschland Tour

1st Stage 1

2001
1st Hürth-Gleuel
2003
1st GP Buchholz
1st Gladbeck
3rd Hel van het Mergelland
3rd Rund um die Hainleite
2004
1st Stolberg-Gressenich
3rd Hel van het Mergelland
2005
1st Jena
6th Hel van het Mergelland
