= Walter Löber =

German cyclist

Personal information
- Born: 29 June 1909 Frankfurt, Germany

Cycling career
- Sport: Cycling
- Role: Rider

Walter Löber (born 29 June 1909, date of death unknown) was a German racing cyclist. He won the German National Road Race in 1939.
