= Otto Schenk (cyclist) =

German cyclist

Cycling career
- Sport: Cycling
- Role: Rider

Otto Schenk was a German racing cyclist. He won the German National Road Race in 1948.
