= Ingrid Persohn =

German cyclist

Personal information
- Born: 20 March 1952 (age 74)

Cycling career
- Sport: Cycling
- Role: Rider

Ingrid Persohn (born 20 March 1952) is a German former professional racing cyclist. She won the German National Road Race Championship in 1970, 1971 and 1975.
