= Emil Kijewski =

German racing cyclist (1911–1989)

Personal information
- Born: 22 November 1911
- Died: 23 January 1989 (aged 77)

Cycling career
- Sport: Cycling

Major wins
- 1st in Rund um Köln (1935, 1937); 1st in Rund um Berlin
Medal record
Representing Germany
Men's road bicycle racing
World Championships
Silver medal – second place	1937 Copenhagen	Elite Men's Road Race

Emil Kijewski (22 November 1911 - 23 January 1989) was a German professional road bicycle racer. He is most known for his silver medal in the Elite race of the 1937 Road World Championships.

== Palmares ==
1934 - Presto
1935
1st, Rund um Köln
1st, Sachsen GP
10th, World Road Race Championship
1936
3rd, National Road Race Championship
1937 - Wanderer
1st, Rund um Köln
1st, Rund um Berlin
1st, Stage 8, Tour de Suisse
1st, Stage 10, Deutschland Tour
(silver) World Road Race Championship
2nd, National Road Race Championship
1938 - Wanderer
1st, Stage 12, Deutschland Tour
1950 - Dürkopp
1st, Stage 1, Schwarzland Rundfahrt
