= Ursula Bürger =

German cyclist

Cycling career
- Sport: Cycling
- Role: Rider

Ursula Bürger is a German former professional racing cyclist. She won the German National Road Race Championship in 1972.
