= 1952 UCI Road World Championships =

- Venue: Luxembourg, Luxembourg
- Date: 23–24 August 1952
- Coordinates: 49°36′N 6°7′E
- Events: 2

The 1952 UCI Road World Championships was the 25th edition of the UCI Road World Championships. It took place on Saturday 23 and Sunday 24 August 1952 in Luxembourg, Luxembourg.

The race for amateurs was ridden on Saturday, August 23. It was 175 kilometres long (10 laps) and was decided in a sprint of a group of 17 riders, which ended in a big confusion. Dutchman Piet van den Brekel and Italian Luciano Ciancola crossed the finish line almost at the same time. Even the finish photo could not show a clear difference. First, Van den Brekel received the flowers, but moments later the Italian was declared world champion. Van den Brekel was disqualified in the evening because he had accepted a spectator's spare bike on the way. André Noyelle thus came second and Luxembourger Roger Ludwig third

The professional road race was held on Sunday, August 24. 48 riders from nine countries participated. The race was 280 kilometres long and covered 16 laps of 17.5 kilometres. The race was surprisingly won by German outsider Heinz Müller who thus became the first German world champion among professional cyclists.

In the same period, the 1952 UCI Track Cycling World Championships was organized in the Parc des Princes in Paris, France.

== Events Summary ==
| Event | Gold | | Silver | | Bronze | |
|---|---|---|---|---|---|---|
Men's Events
| Professional Road Race | Heinz Müller; West Germany | 7h 49' 54" | Gottfried Weilenmann, Jr. Switzerland | s.t. | Ludwig Hörmann; West Germany | s.t. |
| Amateur Road Race | Luciano Ciancola; Italy | - | André Noyelle; Belgium | - | Roger Ludwig; Luxembourg | - |
