= Richard Golle =

German cyclist

Personal information
- Born: 28 May 1895 Berlin, Germany

Cycling career
- Sport: Cycling
- Role: Rider

Richard Golle (born 28 May 1895, date of death unknown) was a German racing cyclist. He won the German National Road Race in 1919 and 1923.
