= Lothar Höhne =

German cyclist

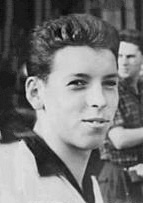
- Höhne in 1960

Sport
- Sport: Cycling

Lothar Höhne (born 30 September 1938 in Marzahna, Wittenberg) is a retired German road cyclist. He won the Tour de Slovaquie in 1959 and the race Rund um Berlin in 1962 and 1964. In 1962 he also won one stage of the Peace Race.
