= Rund um die Hainleite =

Classic cycling race in Germany

Race details
- Date: Mid-August
- Region: Erfurt, Germany
- Local name(s): Rund um die Hainleite (in German)
- Discipline: Road
- Competition: UCI Europe Tour
- Type: Single-day

History
- First edition: 1907
- Editions: 82 (as of 2007)
- Final edition: 2007
- First winner: W. Ochs (GER)
- Most wins: Mario Kummer, Paul Kohl & Täve Schur (3 wins)
- Final winner: Greg Van Avermaet (BEL)

The Rund um die Hainleite is a classic cycling race in and around the German city of Erfurt, Germany. Since 2005, it has been part of the UCI Europe Tour, being organised as 1.1 race. First held in 1907 the race ran celebrated its 100-year anniversary for its final edition in 2007.

The event started as a National level event in 1907 and rose to being UCI 1.5 rated in 1997. Becoming then a 1.3 in 2002 before finally in 2005 becoming a 1.1 rated event. It kept this rating until the final edition in 2007.

== Winners ==
Year	Country	Rider	Team
1907	Germany	W. Ochs	
1908	Germany	H. Schröckel	
1909	Germany	H. Schröckel	
1910	Germany	Gustav Schulze	
1911	Germany	K. Trettenborn	
1911	Germany	Karl Zander	
1912	Germany	A. Frömming	
1912	Germany	F. Suter	
1913	Germany	Erich Aberger	
1913	Germany	H. Koch	
1914	Germany	Erich Aberger	
1914	Germany	P. Fehlau	
1915- 1919	No race		
1920	Germany	K. Ohme	
1921	Germany	Adolf Huschke	
1921	Germany	M. Werner	
1922	Germany	A. Roßner	
1922	Germany	Paul Kohl	
1923	Germany	M. Werner	
1924	Germany	Otto Nitze	
1925	Germany	Paul Kohl	
1925	Germany	R. Beyer	
1926	Germany	O. Gugau	
1926	Italy	P. Belloni	
1927	Germany	G. Zind	
1927	Germany	R. Schuster	
1928	Germany	Paul Kohl	
1928	Germany	R. Hahn	
1928	Germany	W. Haucke	
1929	Germany	H. Puttkammer	
1929	Germany	H. Stache	
1930	Germany	O. Beyer	
1931	Germany	O. Michael	
1931	Germany	S. Kley	
1932	Germany	K. Kerber	
1932	Germany	R. Risch	
1933	Belgium	F. Mertens	
1933	Germany	G. Stache	
1934	Germany	F. Anger	
1934	Germany	H. Schumann	
1935	Germany	E. Scheller	
1935	Germany	E. Westhaus	
1936	Germany	F. Ruhland	
1936	Germany	P. Machleidt	
1937	Germany	W. Nickel	
1937	Germany	W. Oberquelle	
1938	Germany	Georg Umbenhauer	
1938	Germany	W. Richter	
1939	Germany	H. Siegel	
1939	Germany	W. Schiffner	
1940	Germany	Fritz Scheller	
1941	Germany	B. Schultze	
1942	Germany	Harry Saager	
1943	Germany	H. Bresching	
1944	Germany	H. Claessen	
1945- 1948	No race		
1949	East Germany	P. Scherner	
1950	East Germany	B. Wille	
1950	East Germany	H. Gaede	
1951	East Germany	F. Funke	
1951	East Germany	W. Fritzsche	
1952	East Germany	L. Meister	
1953	East Germany	E. Ziegler	
1954	East Germany	Gustav-Adolf Schur	
1955	East Germany	R. Kirchoff	
1955	East Germany	S. Wustrow	
1956	East Germany	G. Oldenburg	
1957	East Germany	Gustav-Adolf Schur	
1957	East Germany	W. Seidel	
1958	East Germany	M. Weißleder	
1959	Belgium	V. Eeckhandt	
1960	East Germany	Gustav-Adolf Schur	
1960	East Germany	E. Hagen	
1961	East Germany	E. Hagen	
1962	East Germany	L. Butzke	
1963	East Germany	K. Taufmann	
1964	East Germany	G. Kellermann	
1965	East Germany	D. Marks	
1966	East Germany	Klaus Ampler	
1967	East Germany	B. Patzig	
1968	No race		
1969	East Germany	W. Braune	
1970	East Germany	D. Grabe	
1971- 1979	No race		
1980	East Germany	Thomas Barth	
1981	East Germany	Mario Kummer	
1982	East Germany	Bernd Drogan	
1982	East Germany	Olaf Ludwig	
1983	East Germany	Uwe Raab	
1984- 1985	No race		
1986	East Germany	Mario Kummer	
1987	East Germany	Uwe Ampler	
1988	No race		
1989	East Germany	Steffen Rein	
1990- 1992	No race		
1993	Germany	Hagen Bernutz	
1994	Germany	Thomas Schlenderlein	
1995	Germany	Roland Nestler	
1996	Germany	Mario Kummer	
1997	Germany	Dirk Müller	
1998	Germany	Thomas Liese	
1999	Germany	Holger Sievers	
2000	Denmark	Nicki Sørensen	Team Fakta
2001	Germany	Christian Wegmann	Saeco
2002	Slovenia	Saša Sviben	Team Nürnberger
2003	Germany	Enrico Poitschke	Team Wiesenhof
2004	Austria	Peter Wrolich	Gerolsteiner
2005	Germany	Bert Grabsch	Phonak
2006	Germany	Jens Voigt	Team CSC
2007	Belgium	Greg Van Avermaet	Predictor–Lotto
