= Ludwig Hörmann =

German cyclist

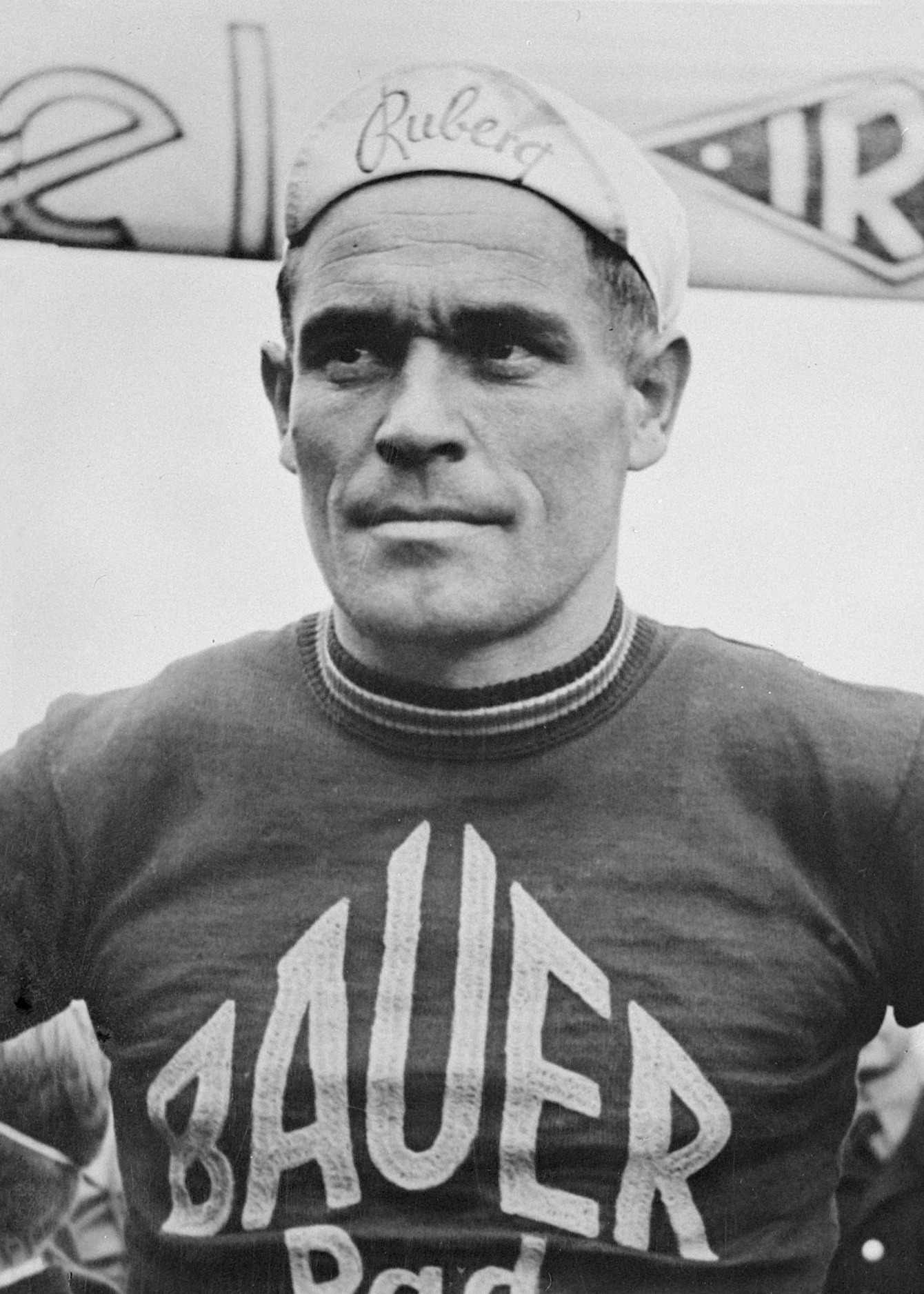
- Ludwig Hörmann in 1952

Personal information
- Born: 6 September 1918 Munich, Germany
- Died: 19 June 2001 (aged 82) Munich, Germany

Cycling career
- Sport: Cycling
- Disciplines: Road, track
- Role: Rider

Professional teams
- 1946–1951: Bauer
- 1952: Bertin–D'Alessandro
- 1953: Ruberg
- 1954: Tebag

Ludwig Hörmann (6 September 1918 – 19 June 2001) was a German cyclist. He won the German National Road Race in 1951 and 1952.

== Major results ==
1939
1st Road race, National Amateur Road Championships
1942
1st Road race, National Amateur Road Championships
1946
3rd Road race, National Road Championships
1950
3rd Road race, National Road Championships
1951
1st Road race, National Road Championships
1st Stage 14 Deutschland Tour
1952
1st Road race, National Road Championships
3rd Road race, UCI Road World Championships
1953
1st Stage 4 Tour du Sud-Est
3rd Grand Prix de Suisse (ITT)
