= Beate Habetz =

German cyclist

Personal information
- Born: 16 January 1961 (age 65) Brauweiler, West Germany

Cycling career
- Sport: Cycling
- Role: Rider

Beate Habetz (born 16 January 1961) is a German former professional racing cyclist. She won the German National Road Race Championship in 1977, 1978, 1979, 1980, 1982 and 1983.
