= Heinz Müller (cyclist) =

German cyclist (1924–1975)

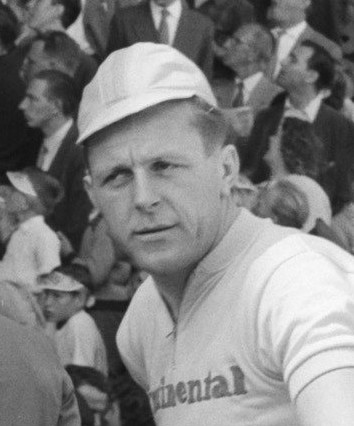

Personal information
- Full name: Heinz Müller
- Born: 16 September 1924 Tuningen, Germany
- Died: 25 September 1975 (aged 51)

Cycling career
- Sport: Cycling
- Disciplines: Road, Track
- Role: Rider

Major wins
- World Road Race Champion (1952)
Medal record
Men's road bicycle racing
Representing West Germany
World Championships
Gold medal – first place	1952 Luxembourg	Elite Men's Road Race

Heinz Müller (16 September 1924 – 25 September 1975) was a German road bicycle racer who won the UCI Road Cycling World Championship in 1952. He also won the German National Road Race in 1953.

== Palmares ==
1949 – Bauer
1st, Stage 9, Deutschland Tour
4th, National Road Race Championship
1950 – Bauer
8th, Overall, Deutschland Tour

Winner Stages 7 & 15

1951 – Bauer, Adria
1st, Stage 9, Deutschland Tour
1952 – Bauer, Tebag
World Road Race Champion
1st, Köln Classic
4th, Overall, Deutschland Tour

Winner Stages 5, 9b & 11

1953 – Bauer, Tigra, La Perle
Germany Road Race Champion
1st, Stage 5, Tour du Sud-Est
1st, Stuttgart
3rd, National Sprint Championship
3rd, Overall, Deutsches Dreitagerennen

Winner Stage 1

4th, Overall, Midi Libre
1954 – Tebag
1st, GP Herperdorsfer
1955 – Tebag, Rabeneick, Bismarck
1st, GP Express
4th, Overall, Deutschland Tour

Winner Stages 5 & 7

5th, National Road Race Championship
1956 – Bauer, Rabeneick
1st, GP Continental
3rd, National Road Race Championship
1957 – Altenburger, Feru, Fichtel & Sachs
1st, Köln Classic
1st, Stage 8, Tour de Suisse
3rd, National Madison Championship (with Walter Schurmann)
5th, National Road Race Championship
1958 – Altenburger, Feru, Molteni, Solo
1st, Berner Rundfahrt
1959 – Altenburger, Feru
1960 – Torpedo
