= Dieter Grabe =

East German cyclist

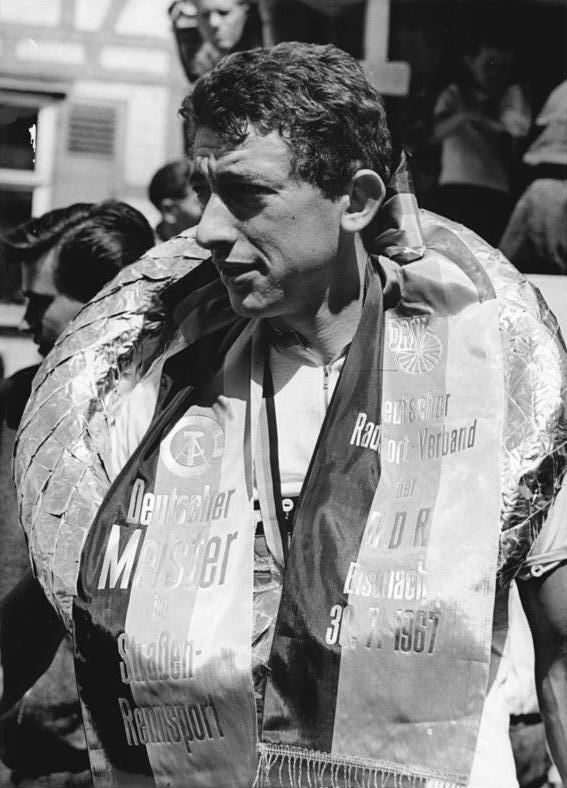
- Dieter Grabe in 1967

Personal information
- Born: 13 September 1945 (age 81) Bennewitz, Soviet occupation zone in Germany

Cycling career
- Sport: Cycling

Dieter Grabe (born 13 September 1945) is an East German former cyclist. He competed in the team time trial at the 1968 Summer Olympics. He won the DDR Rundfahrt in 1968.
