= Hermann Schild =

German cyclist

Personal information
- Born: 16 February 1913 Guben, Germany
- Died: 9 April 2006 (aged 93) Munich, Germany

Cycling career
- Sport: Cycling
- Role: Rider

Hermann Schild (16 February 1913 – 9 April 2006) was a German racing cyclist. He rode in the 1938 Tour de France, and he won the German National Road Race in 1954.
