= Ines Varenkamp =

German cyclist

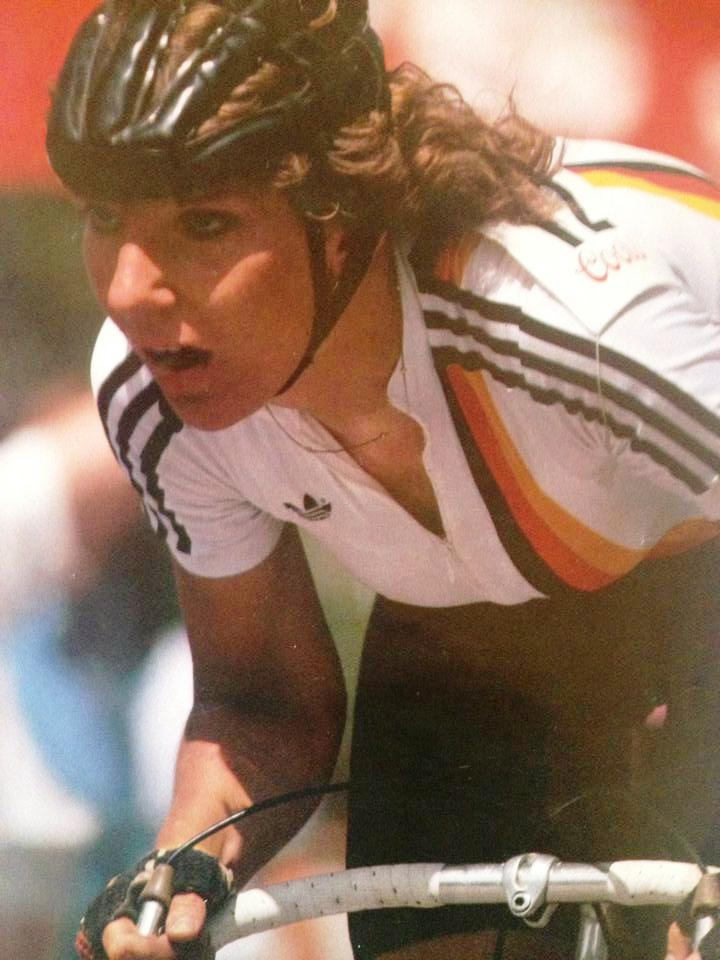

Personal information
- Born: 15 November 1963 (age 62) Varel, West Germany

Cycling career
- Sport: Cycling
- Role: Rider

Ines Varenkamp (born 15 November 1963) is a German former professional racing cyclist. She won the German National Road Race Championship in 1988. She also rode at the 1984 Summer Olympics and 1988 Summer Olympics.
