= Peter Glemser =

German cyclist (born 1940)

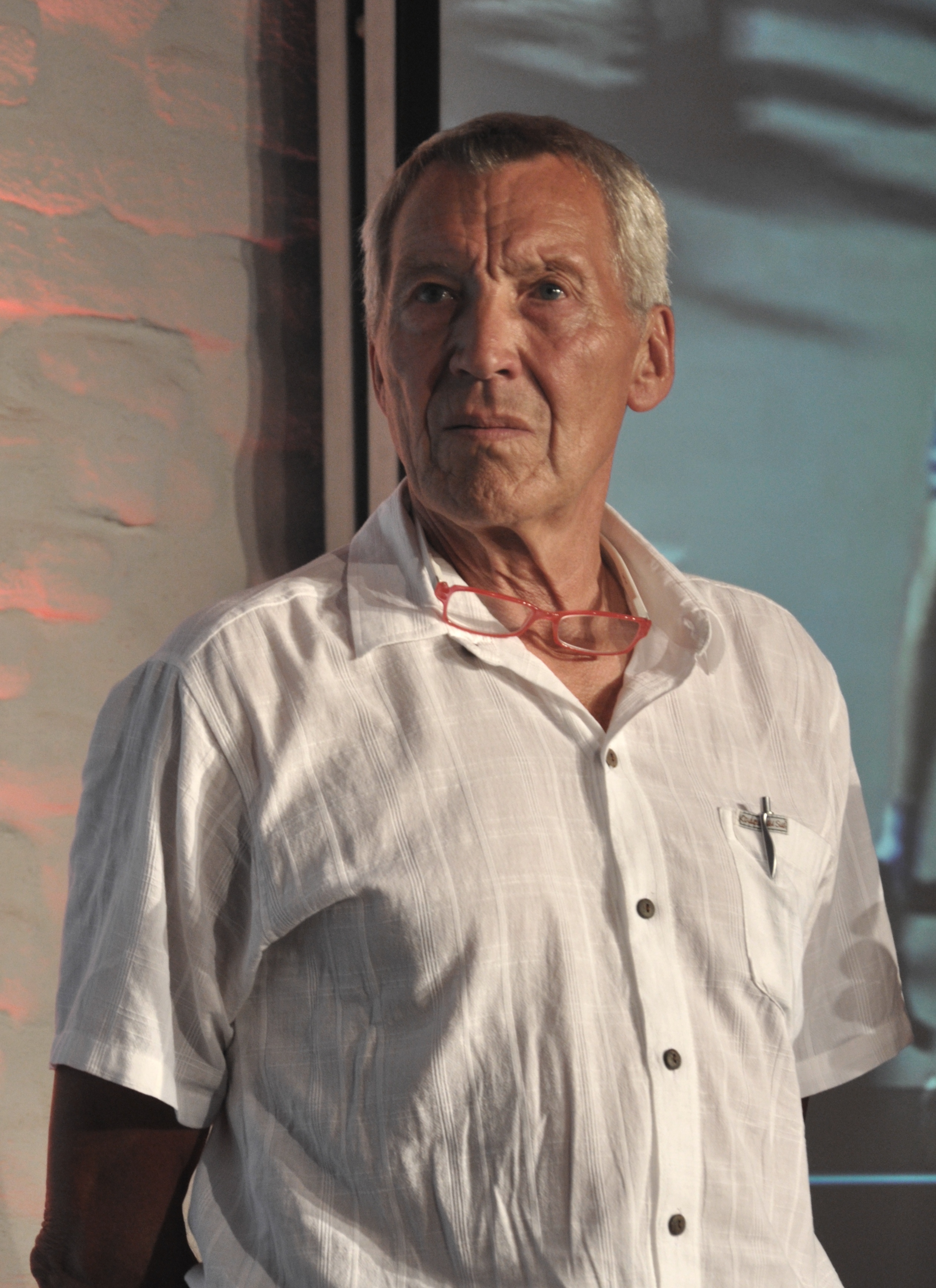

Personal information
- Born: 12 December 1940 (age 85) Stuttgart, Germany
- Height: 188 cm (6 ft 2 in)
- Weight: 82 kg (181 lb)

Cycling career
- Sport: Cycling

Professional team
- Stuttgarter SC

Peter Glemser (born 12 December 1940) is a former German cyclist. He competed in the team time trial at the 1964 Summer Olympics. He won the German National Road Race in 1969.
