= Jürgen Tschan =

German cyclist (born 1947)

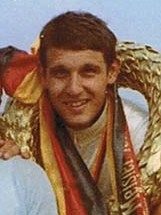
- Jürgen Tschan in 1968

Personal information
- Born: 17 February 1947 (age 79) Mannheim, Germany

Cycling career
- Sport: Cycling
- Role: Rider

Jürgen Tschan (born 17 February 1947) is a German former racing cyclist. He won the German National Road Race in 1971. He also competed at the 1968 Summer Olympics.
