= Georg Voggenreiter =

German cyclist (1912–1986)

Personal information
- Born: 20 September 1912 Nürnberg, Germany
- Died: 27 September 1986 (aged 74) Nürnberg, Germany

Cycling career
- Sport: Cycling
- Role: Rider

Georg Voggenreiter (20 September 1912 – 27 September 1986) was a German racing cyclist. He won the German National Road Race in 1947.
