= Karl Kittsteiner =

German cyclist (1920–2011)

Personal information
- Born: 20 June 1920 Worzeldorf, Germany
- Died: 12 August 2011 (aged 91) Nürnberg, Germany

Cycling career
- Sport: Cycling
- Role: Rider

Karl Kittsteiner (20 June 1920 – 12 August 2011) was a German racing cyclist. He won the German National Road Race in 1946.
