= Vera Hohlfeld =

German cyclist

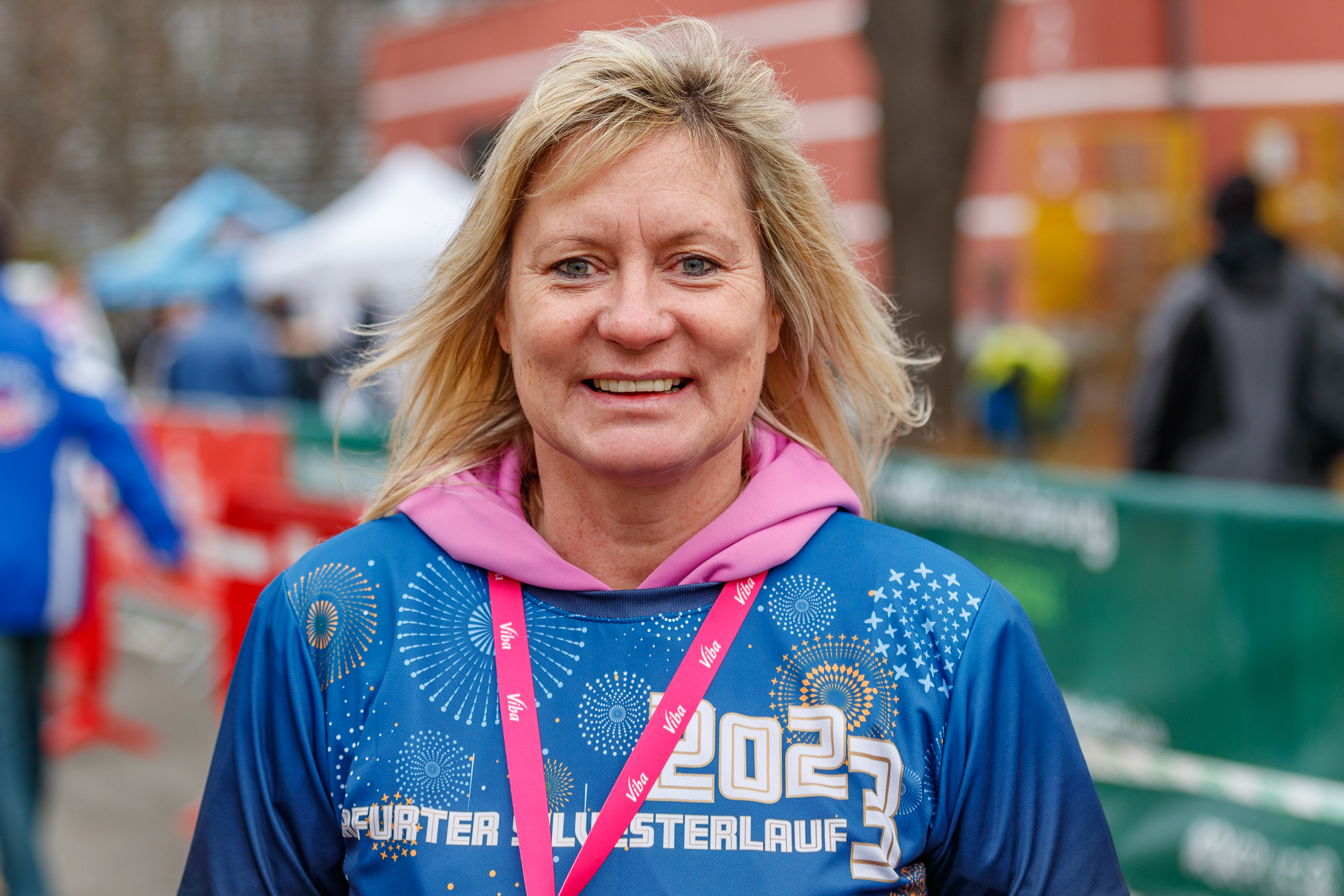
- 2023 at the Erfurt silvester run

Personal information
- Full name: Vera Hohlfeld
- Born: 24 February 1972 (age 54) Erfurt, East Germany
- Height: 168 cm (5 ft 6 in)
- Weight: 57 kg (126 lb)

Cycling career
- Sport: Cycling
- Discipline: Road cycling
- Role: Rider

Vera Hohlfeld (born 24 February 1972) is a road cyclist from Germany. She represented her nation at the 1996 Summer Olympics where she finished fourth in the women's road race.

== Major results ==
1994
7th UCI Road World Championships – Women's time trial
