= Wilfried Trott =

German cyclist

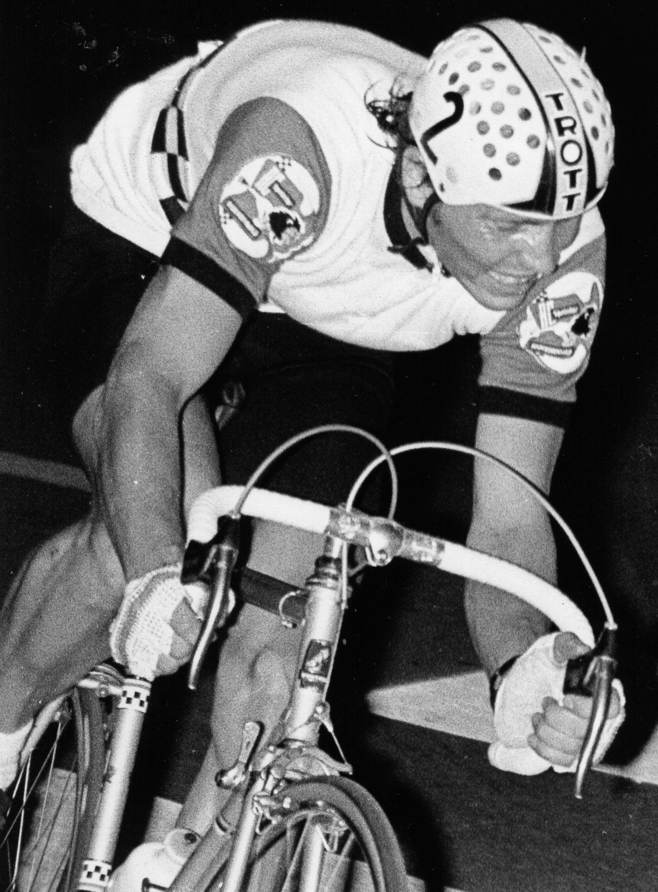

Personal information
- Born: 25 July 1948 (age 78) Wuppertal, Germany

Cycling career
- Sport: Cycling

Wilfried Trott (born 25 July 1948) is a German former cyclist. He competed at the 1972 Summer Olympics and the 1976 Summer Olympics for West Germany.
