= Michael Schiffner =

East German cyclist

Personal information
- Born: 13 July 1949 (age 77) Leipzig, Soviet occupation zone in Germany

Cycling career
- Sport: Cycling

Michael Schiffner (born 13 July 1949) is a German former cyclist. He competed for East Germany in the team time trial event at the 1976 Summer Olympics.
