= Gabi Habetz =

German cyclist

Cycling career
- Sport: Cycling
- Role: Rider

Gabi Habetz is a German former professional racing cyclist. She won the German National Road Race Championship in 1981.
