= Viola Paulitz =

German cyclist

Personal information
- Full name: Viola Paulitz-Mueller
- Born: 22 March 1967 (age 59) Hildesheim, West Germany
- Height: 164 cm (5 ft 5 in)
- Weight: 57 kg (126 lb)

Cycling career
- Sport: Cycling
- Discipline: Road cycling
- Role: Rider

Viola Paulitz-Mueller (born 22 March 1967) is a road cyclist from Germany. She represented West-Germany at the 1988 Summer Olympics in the women's road race and Germany at the 1992 Summer Olympics in the women's road race.
