= Ernst Franz =

German cyclist

Personal information
- Born: 8 May 1894 Karlsbad, Austria-Hungary
- Died: 9 February 1915 (aged 20) Carpathian Mountains

Cycling career
- Sport: Cycling
- Role: Rider

Ernst Franz (8 May 1894 – 9 February 1915) was a German Bohemian racing cyclist. He won the German National Road Race in 1913. He was killed during World War I.
