= Paul Koch (cyclist) =

German cyclist

Personal information
- Born: 22 May 1897 Seehof, Germany
- Died: 22 October 1959 (aged 62) Berlin, Germany

Cycling career
- Sport: Cycling
- Role: Rider

Paul Koch (22 May 1897 – 22 October 1959) was a German racing cyclist. He won the German National Road Race in 1920.
