= Karl Wittig =

German cyclist

Personal information
- Born: 11 November 1890 Berlin, Germany
- Died: 4 September 1958 (aged 67) Berlin, Germany

Cycling career
- Sport: Cycling
- Role: Rider

Karl Wittig (11 November 1890 – 4 September 1958) was a German racing cyclist. He won the German National Road Race in 1910.
