= Heinrich Schultenjohann =

German cyclist

Personal information
- Born: 2 November 1913

Cycling career
- Sport: Cycling
- Discipline: Road
- Role: Rider

Heinrich Schultenjohann (born 2 November 1913, date of death unknown) was a German racing cyclist. He rode in the 1937 Tour de France.
