= Hans Preiskeit =

German cyclist (1920–1972)

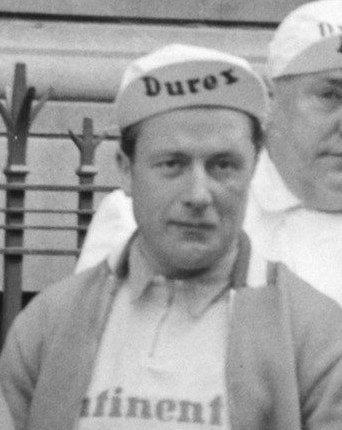
- Hans Preiskeit (1955)

Personal information
- Born: 26 September 1920 Breslau, Germany
- Died: 26 June 1972 (aged 51) Rosenheim, Germany

Cycling career
- Sport: Cycling
- Role: Rider

Hans Preiskeit (26 September 1920 – 26 June 1972) was a German racing cyclist. He won the German National Road Race in 1955.
