= Ute Enzenauer =

German cyclist

Personal information
- Born: 18 January 1965 (age 61) Friesenheim, West Germany

Cycling career
- Sport: Cycling
Medal record
Representing West Germany
Women's Road bicycle racing
UCI Road World Championships
Gold medal – first place	1981	Road Race

Ute Enzenauer (born 18 January 1965) is a former West German road racing cyclist active from 1981 to 1987. Born in Ludwigshafen-Friesenheim, Rheinland-Pfalz, Enzenauer was selected from school at age 9 as a cyclist. She won the West German National Championships in 1979 and 1980. In 1981 she became the youngest World Champion ever, winning Women's World Road Championships at age 16. She raced the 1984 Olympic Games in Los Angeles, California finishing 8th. After finishing 3rd place overall in 1987 Women's Tour de France (Grande Boucle), she retired from the sport.
