= Winfried Bölke =

German cyclist (1941–2021)

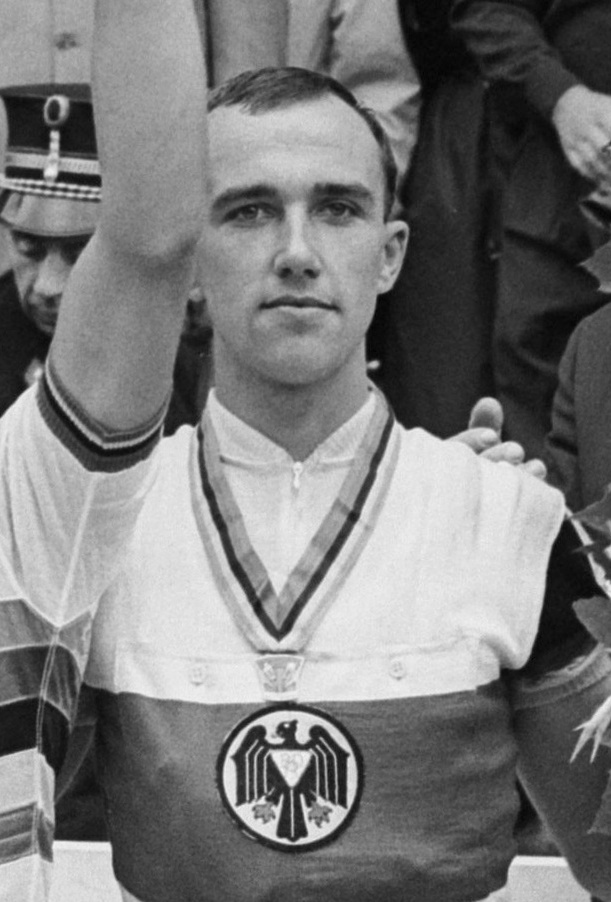
- Bölke at the 1963 UCI Road World Championships

Personal information
- Born: 25 May 1941 Genthin, Saxony, Prussia, Germany
- Died: 26 January 2021 (aged 79) Dortmund, North Rhine-Westphalia, Germany

Cycling career
- Sport: Cycling
Medal record
Representing West Germany
Men's road bicycle racing
World Championships
Bronze medal – third place	1963 Renaix	Amateur's Road Race

Winfried Bölke (25 May 1941 – 26 January 2021) was a German cyclist.

== Career ==
He rode for West Germany. In 1963, he won the national championships and a bronze medal at the world championships in the road race for amateurs. Next year, he turned professional and won the Tour de Picardie and one stage at the Volta a Catalunya. In 1965–1967, he won all national road race championships, as well as one madison title in 1967. In the following three years, he won the road races of Maaslandse Pijl (1968), Saint-Raphael (1969), Kaistenberg (1970) and Porz (1970). He continued competing professionally until 1973.
