= Deutschland Tour =

Road bicycle race in Germany

Race details
- Date: August
- Region: Germany
- English name: Tour of Germany
- Local name: Deutschland Tour (in German)
- Discipline: Road
- Competition: UCI ProTour (2005–2008); UCI Europe Tour (2018–2019); UCI ProSeries (2021–)
- Type: Stage-race
- Organiser: Gesellschaft zur Förderung des Radsports mbH
- Web site: www.deutschland-tour.com

History
- First edition: 1911
- Editions: 40 (as of 2026)
- First winner: Hans Ludwig (GER)
- Most wins: Jens Voigt (GER) (2 wins)
- Most recent: Isaac del Toro (MEX)

The Deutschland Tour (English: Tour of Germany and sometimes Deutschland-Rundfahrt in German) is the most important multi-stage road bicycle race in Germany. Initially the race was held in May/June, but from 2005 until 2008 it was moved to August as part of the UCI ProTour. On October 16, 2008, the organizers announced that the 2009 edition would be cancelled, following the doping cases that were revealed in the sport of cycling. Marketing chiefs said they were unable to finance the nine-day race due to a lack of interested sponsors after the latest revelations of cyclists testing positive for the blood-booster CERA. A revival for 2017 was announced on 8 March 2016. In 2018, the A.S.O. revived the Deutschland Tour and included a 4-stage-race into a cycling festival. From 23 August to 26 August 2018, the Deutschland Tour took place in the South-Western region of Germany.

The 2019 race was held from 29 August to 1 September.

== History ==
Beginning in 1911 a "national" cycling race of over 1,500 kilometres (930 mi) was held in Germany (which was then composed of several territories and kingdoms). Until 1931 several real—more-or-less—Tours were held, but always under very different conditions and organisations. In 1931 the first Deutschlandtour was held, and it is generally agreed upon that the race was exciting and well organised between 1937 and 1939, the start of World War II.

Germany never had a significant road cycling history, unlike Belgium, France or Italy, which caused the race's popularity to depend on German successes. This resulted in several parallel tours of West-Germany.

But after Jan Ullrich's Tour de France victory, cycling became more popular. Partially as a result of Germany's new-found cycling enthusiasm, in 1999 the Deutschlandtour became invigorated. In 1998 the Bund Deutscher Radfahrer e.V. and the company Upsolut founded the Deutschland Tour gmbh.

In March 2016, the Amaury Sport Organisation announced it had signed a 10-year deal with the German Cycling Federation to bring the race back within the next two years. In July the race was confirmed as the Deutschland Deine Tour debuting in 2018, reduced to four stages and relegated to a UCI 2.1 European Tour race. The race is part of the new UCI ProSeries since 2021.

== Past winners ==
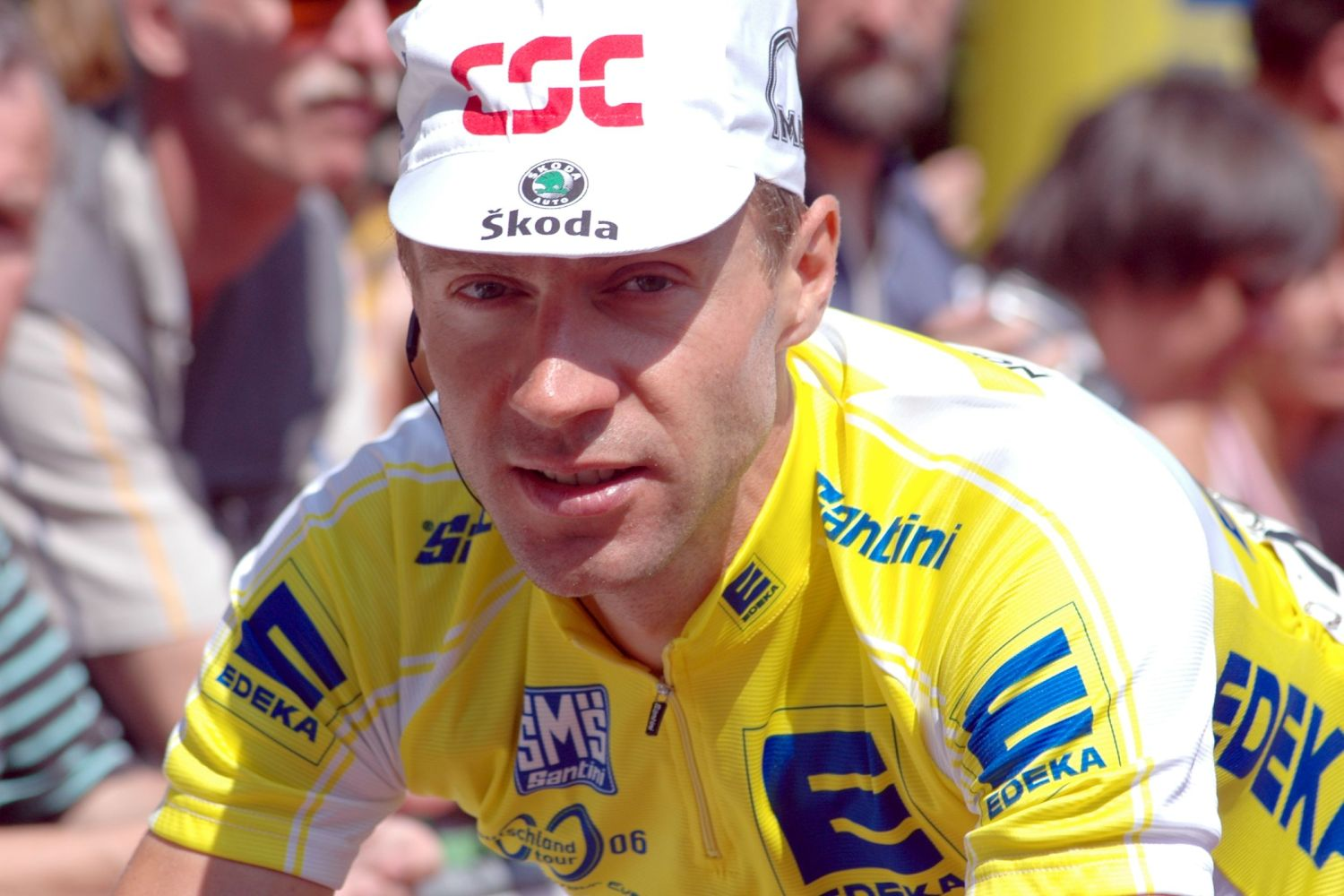
Jens Voigt (pictured at the 2006 Deutschland Tour) is the only rider with two Deutschland Tour wins.

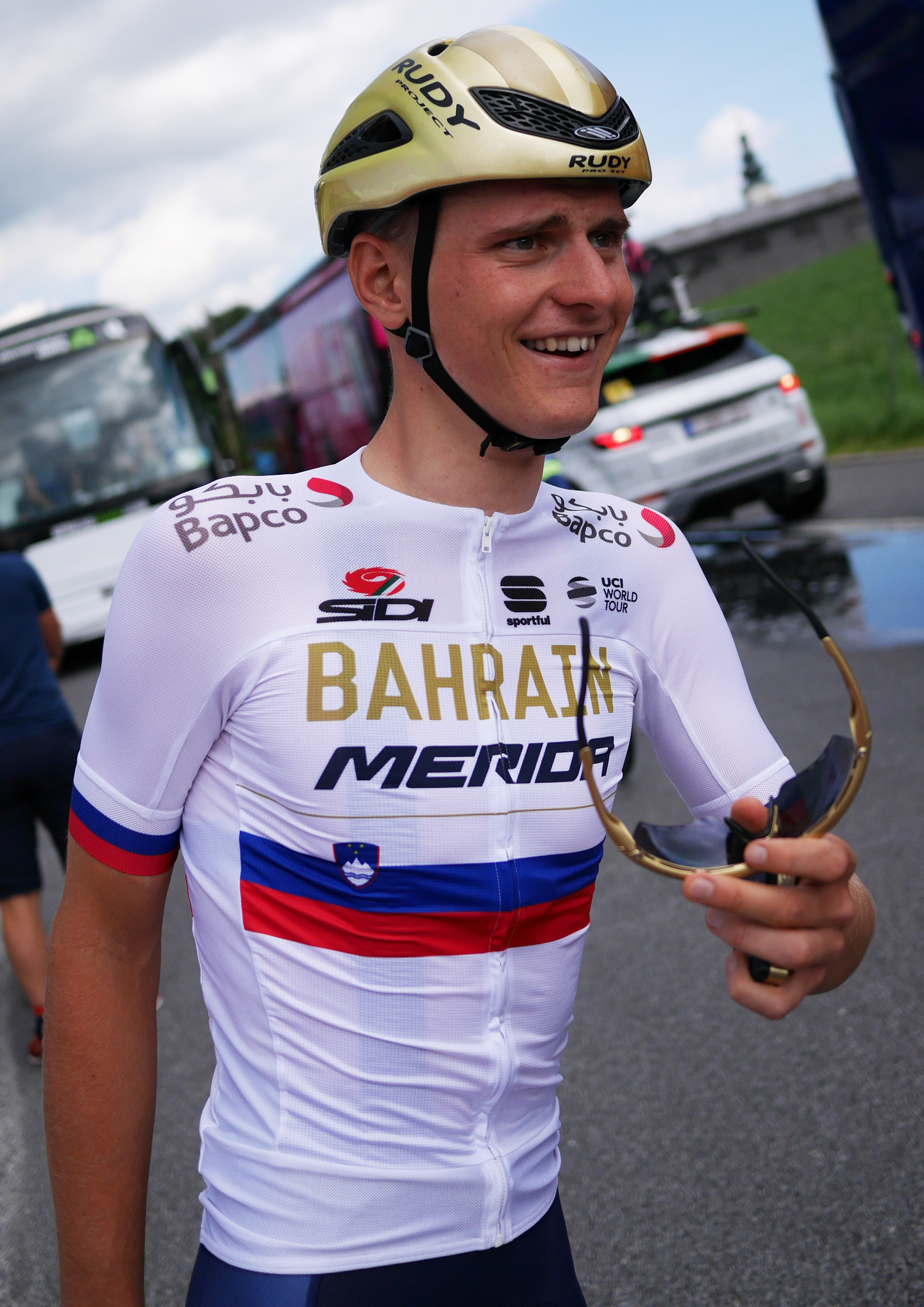
Matej Mohorič won the 2018 edition.

| Year | Country | Rider | Team |
|---|---|---|---|
| 1911 | Germany | Hans Ludwig | |
| 1912–1921 | No race | | |
| 1922 | Germany | Adolf Huschke | |
| 1923–1926 | No race | | |
| 1927 | Germany | Rudolf Wolke | |
| 1928–1929 | No race | | |
| 1930 | Germany | Hermann Buse | Dürkopp Adler |
| 1931 | Germany | Erich Metze | |
| 1932–1936 | No race | | |
| 1937 | Germany | Otto Weckerling | Dürkopp Adler |
| 1938 | Germany | Hermann Schild | Presto |
| 1939 | Germany | Georg Umbenhauer | RV Union 1886-Nürnberg |
| 1940–1946 | No race due to World War II | | |
| 1947 | Germany | Erich Bautz | Patria W.K.C. |
| 1948 | Germany | Phillip Hilpert | |
| 1949 | Germany | Harry Saager | Rabeneick |
| 1950 | Belgium | Roger Gyselinck | |
| 1951 | Italy | Guido de Santi | Colomb-Manera |
| 1952 | Belgium | Isidore Derijck | |
| 1953–1954 | No race | | |
| 1955 | West Germany | Rudi Theissen | |
| 1956–1959 | No race | | |
| 1960 | Netherlands | Ab Geldermans | Rapha–Gitane–Dunlop |
| 1961 | West Germany | Friedhelm Fischerkeller | Faema |
| 1962 | Netherlands | Peter Post | Flandria–Faema-Clement |
| 1963–1978 | No race | | |
| 1979 | West Germany | Dietrich Thurau | IJsboerke |
| 1980 | West Germany | Gregor Braun | Sanson–Campagnolo |
| 1981 | Italy | Silvano Contini | Bianchi–Faema |
| 1982 | Netherlands | Theo de Rooij | Capri Sonne |
| 1983–1998 | No race | | |
| 1999 | Germany | Jens Heppner | Team Telekom |
| 2000 | Spain | David Plaza | S.L. Benfica |
| 2001 | Kazakhstan | Alexander Vinokourov | Team Telekom |
| 2002 | Spain | Igor González de Galdeano | ONCE |
| 2003 | Australia | Michael Rogers | Quick Step–Davitamon |
| 2004 | Germany | Patrik Sinkewitz | Quick Step–Davitamon |
| 2005 | United States | Levi Leipheimer | Gerolsteiner |
| 2006 | Germany | Jens Voigt | Team CSC |
| 2007 | Germany | Jens Voigt | Team CSC |
| 2008 | Germany | Linus Gerdemann | T-Mobile Team |
| 2009–2017 | No race | | |
| 2018 | Slovenia | Matej Mohorič | Bahrain–Merida |
| 2019 | Belgium | Jasper Stuyven | Trek–Segafredo |
| 2020 | No race due to COVID-19 pandemic | | |
| 2021 | Germany | Nils Politt | Bora–Hansgrohe |
| 2022 | Great Britain | Adam Yates | INEOS Grenadiers |
| 2023 | Belgium | Ilan Van Wilder | Soudal–Quick-Step |
| 2024 | Denmark | Mads Pedersen | Lidl–Trek |
| 2025 | Norway | Søren Wærenskjold | Uno-X Mobility |
| 2026 | Mexico | Isaac del Toro | UAE Team Emirates XRG |
