= Paul Kohl =

German cyclist

Personal information
- Born: 12 November 1894 Berlin, Germany
- Died: 17 December 1959 (aged 65) Berlin, Germany

Cycling career
- Sport: Cycling
- Role: Rider

Paul Kohl (12 November 1894 – 17 December 1959) was a German racing cyclist. He won the German National Road Race in 1924.
