= Adolf Huschke =

German cyclist

Personal information
- Born: 14 October 1891 Berlin, German Empire
- Died: 29 August 1923 (aged 31) Oranienburg, Germany

Cycling career
- Sport: Cycling
- Role: Rider

Adolf Huschke (14 October 1891 – 29 August 1923) was a German racing cyclist. He won the German National Road Race in 1921.
