= 2010 Team Milram season =

2010 Team Milram season
Manager	Gerry van Gerwen
One-day victories	4
Stage race overall victories	–
Stage race stage victories	4
Previous season

The 2010 season for Team Milram, its last, began in January with the Tour Down Under and ended in October at the Giro di Lombardia. As a UCI ProTour team, they were automatically invited and obliged to attend every event in the ProTour. The team's ridership was largely unchanged from the 2009 season.

== 2010 roster ==
Ages as of 1 January 2010.

Rider	Date of birth
Gerald Ciolek (GER)	19 September 1986 (aged 23)
Wim De Vocht (BEL)	29 April 1982 (aged 27)
Markus Eichler (GER)	18 February 1982 (aged 27)
Robert Förster (GER)	27 January 1978 (aged 31)
Markus Fothen (GER)	9 September 1981 (aged 28)
Thomas Fothen (GER)	16 April 1983 (aged 26)
Johannes Fröhlinger (GER)	9 June 1985 (aged 24)
Artur Gajek (GER)	18 April 1985 (aged 24)
Linus Gerdemann (GER)	16 September 1982 (aged 27)
Roger Kluge (GER)	5 February 1986 (aged 23)
Servais Knaven (NED)	6 March 1971 (aged 38)
Christian Knees (GER)	5 March 1981 (aged 28)

Rider	Date of birth
Dominik Nerz (GER)	25 August 1989 (aged 20)
Luke Roberts (AUS)	25 January 1977 (aged 32)
Dominik Roels (GER)	21 January 1987 (aged 22)
Thomas Rohregger (AUT)	23 December 1982 (aged 27)
Matthias Russ (GER)	14 November 1983 (aged 26)
Björn Schröder (GER)	27 October 1980 (aged 29)
Roy Sentjens (BEL)	15 December 1980 (aged 29)
Wim Stroetinga (NED)	23 May 1985 (aged 24)
Niki Terpstra (NED)	18 May 1984 (aged 25)
Paul Voss (GER)	26 March 1986 (aged 23)
Fabian Wegmann (GER)	20 June 1980 (aged 29)
Peter Wrolich (AUT)	20 May 1974 (aged 35)

Riders who joined the team for the 2010 season

Rider	2009 team
Wim De Vocht	Vacansoleil
Roger Kluge	LKT Team Brandenburg
Dominik Nerz	Continental Team Milram
Luke Roberts	ex-pro (Team CSC, 2007)
Roy Sentjens	Silence–Lotto

Riders who left the team during or after the 2009 season

Rider	2010 team
Luca Barla	Free agent
Christian Kux	Free agent
Martin Müller	Retired
Ronny Scholz	Retired
Martin Velits	Team HTC–Columbia
Peter Velits	Team HTC–Columbia

== Stage races ==
Rohregger won the mountains classification at the first ProTour event of the season, the Tour Down Under.

== Grand Tours ==
=== Giro d'Italia ===
Gerdemann was the leader of Team Milram's squad at the Giro d'Italia, in his first participation in the event. Förster, a three-time Giro stage winner, was brought along with the sprints in mind. In stage 3 in the Netherlands, Förster, Gerdemann, and Rohregger all avoided the many crashes that took place on the day and finished with the leading group, taking third, seventh, and ninth respectively in the sprint. Gerdemann was in eighth overall, 12 seconds back, before the transfer to Italy. In the stage 4 team time trial, the squad was tenth, finishing with five riders 57 seconds off the pace of stage winners Liquigas–Doimo. In stage 6, Gerdemann finished the stage with the peloton and moved into eighth overall, leapfrogging in the overall standings over several sprinters who were left minutes behind. Gerdemann and Rohregger finished together, for 12th and 13th at one minute and 13 seconds back, in the difficult and muddy stage 7 in Tuscany. With this result, both were in the top ten for a day, though both were dropped on Monte Terminillo the next day and fell out of the top ten. Förster took fourth and then fifth in the sprint finishes to stages 9 and 10.

In stage 11, more than 50 riders formed the day's breakaway, with the Giro's favorites conceding nearly 13 minutes to the stage winner. Gerdemann and Russ made the selection, and with sixth on the stage Gerdemann moved into seventh overall. In the first of the Giro's several mountain stages in its last week, Gerdemann rode the Monte Grappa climb with the second group on the road, losing 2'25" to stage winner Vincenzo Nibali but moving up to fifth in the overall classification. Gerdemann conceded time in each climbing stage the rest of the way, and the squad did not have any high stage placings from stage 14 on. Gerdemann completed the race in 16th place, at a deficit of 34'49 to Giro champion Ivan Basso. The squad finished 19th in the Trofeo Fast Team standings and 14th in the Trofeo Super Team.

=== Tour de France ===
Gerdemann also led Milram's squad for the Tour de France, with Ciolek their primary sprinter. Gerdemann showed well in the prologue time trial, coming in tenth, 35 seconds off the winning time of Fabian Cancellara. Over the next two days, the team took numerous meaningless high placings, as both of the first two road race stages involved neutralizations following crashes. The squad was largely unaffected by the myriad of crashes that took place on the Col du Stockeu in Spa in stage 2, though Terpstra did crash at one point. In a more straightforward flat stage in stage 5, Ciolek took second behind Mark Cavendish in the field sprint finish. He was sixth the next day in a similar finish. Roberts made a winning breakaway in stage 15, but was left well short of victory on the day, finishing with Alberto Contador's group three minutes behind stage winner Thomas Voeckler, as the new race leader caught the last remnants of that group right at the finish. In the Tour's largely ceremonial final stage, Ciolek again figured into the sprint finish, taking sixth on the day. No member of the squad was ever competitive in the overall standings. Rohregger was their highest-placed rider at the race's conclusion, in 74th place, 2 hours and 12 minutes behind Tour champion Contador. Gerdemann was 84th, a further 24 minutes back. The squad finished in last place in the teams classification.

== Team dissolution ==
=== Riders' 2011 teams ===
Rider	2011 team
Gerald Ciolek	Quick-Step
Wim De Vocht	Veranda's Willems–Accent
Markus Eichler	Team NSP (Note: Rider originally signed with the Pegasus Racing team which folded before the season began. The team listed is who they actually rode for in 2011.)
Robert Förster	UnitedHealthcare
Markus Fothen	Team NSP
Thomas Fothen	Team NSP
Johannes Fröhlinger	Skil–Shimano
Artur Gajek	None
Linus Gerdemann	Leopard Trek
Roger Kluge	Skil–Shimano
Servais Knaven	Retired (Note: Knaven joined Team Sky as a directeur sportif for the 2011 season.)
Christian Knees	Team Sky

Rider	2011 team
Dominik Nerz	Liquigas–Cannondale
Luke Roberts	Saxo Bank–SunGard
Dominik Roels	Retired
Thomas Rohregger	Leopard Trek
Matthias Russ	Retired
Björn Schröder	Team Nutrixxion Sparkasse
Roy Sentjens	Retired after positive doping test
Wim Stroetinga	Ubbink-Koba Cycling Team (Note: Ubbink-Koba is a track cycling team; Stroetinga could not find a contract with a road team for 2011.)
Niki Terpstra	Quick-Step
Paul Voss	Endura Racing
Fabian Wegmann	Leopard Trek
Peter Wrolich	Retired

== Season victories ==
Date	Race	Competition	Rider	Country	Location
24 January	Tour Down Under, Mountains classification	UCI ProTour	Thomas Rohregger (AUT)	Australia	
9 February	Trofeo Inca	UCI Europe Tour	Linus Gerdemann (GER)	Spain	Mallorca
12 February	Tour of Qatar, Youth classification	UCI Asia Tour	Roger Kluge (GER)	Qatar	
5 March	Vuelta a Murcia, Stage 3	UCI Europe Tour	Luke Roberts (AUS)	Spain	Alhama de Murcia
10 March	Tirreno–Adriatico, Stage 1	UCI World Ranking	Linus Gerdemann (GER)	Italy	Rosignano Solvay
22 March	Volta a Catalunya, Stage 1	UCI ProTour	Paul Voss (GER)	Spain	Lloret de Mar
1 May	Eschborn-Frankfurt City Loop	UCI Europe Tour	Fabian Wegmann (GER)	Germany	Frankfurt
23 May	Neuseen Classics	UCI Europe Tour	Roger Kluge (GER)	Germany	Leipzig
28 May	Bayern-Rundfahrt, Stage 3	UCI Europe Tour	Gerald Ciolek (GER)	Germany	Hersbruck
8 August	Sparkassen Giro Bochum	UCI Europe Tour	Niki Terpstra (NED)	Germany	Bochum
