= 2011 Bayern Rundfahrt =

2010–11 UCI Europe Tour
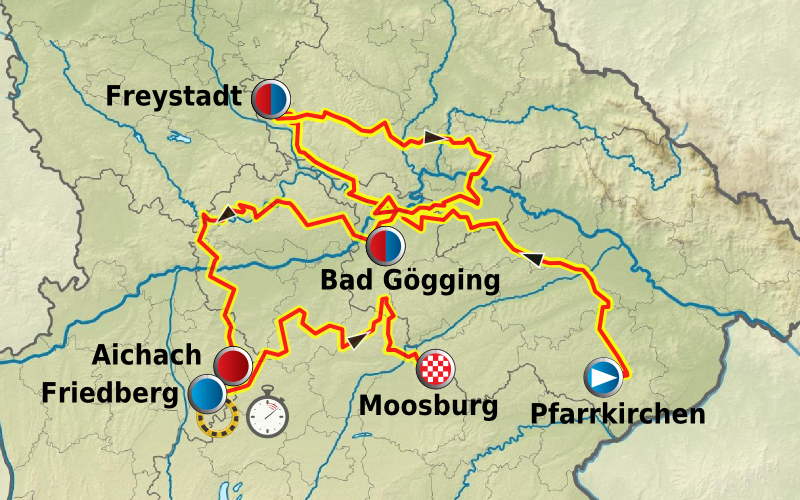
- Route of the 2011 Bayern-Rundfahrt

Race details
- Dates: 25–29 May
- Stages: 5
- Distance: 798.2 km (496.0 mi)
- Winning time: 19h 09' 36"

Results
Jersey awarded to the overall winner	Winner	Geraint Thomas (Great Britain)	(Team Sky)
	Second	Nicki Sørensen (Denmark)	(Saxo Bank–SunGard)
	Third	Michael Albasini (Switzerland)	(HTC–Highroad)
Jersey awarded to the points classification winner	Points	Edvald Boasson Hagen (Norway)	(Team Sky)
Jersey awarded to the mountains classification winner	Mountains	Pieter Serry (Belgium)	(Topsport Vlaanderen–Mercator)
Jersey awarded to the youth classification winner	Youth	Thibaut Pinot (France)	(FDJ)
	Team	Team Sky	

The 2011 Bayern Rundfahrt (2011 Tour of Bavaria) was the 32nd edition of the Bayern Rundfahrt, an annual cycling road race. Departing from Pfarrkirchen on 25 May, it concluded in Moosburg on 29 May. The 798.2 km long stage race was part of the 2010–11 UCI Europe Tour, and was rated as a 2.HC event. Geraint Thomas of Team Sky won the general classification, the first Briton to win the competition.

== Teams ==
18 teams were invited to participate in the tour: 8 UCI ProTeams, 6 UCI Professional Continental Teams and 4 UCI Continental Teams.

UCI ProTeams
- Leopard Trek
- Saxo Bank–SunGard
- Team Sky
- Euskaltel–Euskadi
- Lampre–ISD
- HTC–Highroad
- Garmin–Cervélo
- Ag2r–La Mondiale
UCI Professional Continental Teams
- Skil–Shimano
- Topsport Vlaanderen–Mercator
- Team Europcar
- FDJ
- Team NetApp
- CCC–Polsat–Polkowice
UCI Continental Teams
- Team Eddy Merckx–Indeland
- Team Heizomat
- Team Nutrixxion–Sparkasse
- Team NSP

== Stages ==
=== Stage 1 ===
25 May 2011 – Pfarrkirchen to Freystadt, 223.2 km (138.7 mi)

Stage 1 Result

	Rider	Team	Time
1	Edvald Boasson Hagen (NOR)	Team Sky	5h 20' 26"
2	André Schulze (GER)	CCC–Polsat–Polkowice	s.t.
3	Heinrich Haussler (AUS)	Garmin–Cervélo	s.t.
4	Lloyd Mondory (FRA)	Ag2r–La Mondiale	s.t.
5	Grischa Janorschke (GER)	Team Nutrixxion–Sparkasse	s.t.
6	Giacomo Nizzolo (ITA)	Leopard Trek	s.t.
7	John Degenkolb (GER)	HTC–Highroad	s.t.
8	Phillipp Ries (GER)	Team Heizomat	s.t.
9	Patrick Bercz (GER)	Team Eddy Merckx–Indeland	s.t.
10	Grega Bole (SLO)	Lampre–ISD	s.t.

General Classification after Stage 1

	Rider	Team	Time
1	Edvald Boasson Hagen (NOR)	Team Sky	5h 20' 16"
2	André Schulze (GER)	CCC–Polsat–Polkowice	+ 4"
3	Maxime Bouet (FRA)	Ag2r–La Mondiale	+ 5"
4	Sander Armée (BEL)	Topsport Vlaanderen–Mercator	s.t.
5	Heinrich Haussler (AUS)	Garmin–Cervélo	+ 6"
6	Jarosław Marycz (POL)	Saxo Bank–SunGard	+ 7"
7	Fabian Wegmann (GER)	Leopard Trek	+ 8"
8	Johannes Fröhlinger (GER)	Skil–Shimano	+ 9"
9	Lloyd Mondory (FRA)	Ag2r–La Mondiale	+ 10"
10	Grischa Janorschke (GER)	Team Nutrixxion–Sparkasse	s.t.

=== Stage 2 ===
26 May 2011 – Freystadt to Bad Gögging, 206.2 km (128.1 mi)

Stage 2 Result

	Rider	Team	Time
1	John Degenkolb (GER)	HTC–Highroad	5h 10' 03"
2	Marcel Kittel (GER)	Skil–Shimano	s.t.
3	Edvald Boasson Hagen (NOR)	Team Sky	s.t.
4	Roger Kluge (GER)	Skil–Shimano	s.t.
5	Grega Bole (SLO)	Lampre–ISD	s.t.
6	Jarosław Marycz (POL)	Saxo Bank–SunGard	s.t.
7	Eric Baumann (GER)	Team NetApp	s.t.
8	Koldo Fernández (ESP)	Euskaltel–Euskadi	s.t.
9	Lloyd Mondory (FRA)	Ag2r–La Mondiale	s.t.
10	Alan Pérez (ESP)	Euskaltel–Euskadi	s.t.

General Classification after Stage 2

	Rider	Team	Time
1	Edvald Boasson Hagen (NOR)	Team Sky	10h 30' 15"
2	John Degenkolb (GER)	HTC–Highroad	+ 4"
3	Marcel Kittel (GER)	Skil–Shimano	+ 8"
4	André Schulze (GER)	CCC–Polsat–Polkowice	+ s.t.
5	Sander Armée (BEL)	Topsport Vlaanderen–Mercator	+ 9"
6	Maxime Bouet (FRA)	Ag2r–La Mondiale	s.t.
7	Heinrich Haussler (AUS)	Garmin–Cervélo	+ 10"
8	Jarosław Marycz (POL)	Saxo Bank–SunGard	+ 11"
9	Thomas Voeckler (FRA)	Team Europcar	s.t.
10	Fabian Wegmann (GER)	Leopard Trek	+ 12"

=== Stage 3 ===
27 May 2011 – Bad Gögging to Aichach, 180.8 km (112.3 mi)

Stage 3 Result

	Rider	Team	Time
1	Michael Albasini (SUI)	HTC–Highroad	4h 28' 01"
2	Geraint Thomas (GBR)	Team Sky	s.t.
3	Wesley Sulzberger (AUS)	FDJ	s.t.
4	Blel Kadri (FRA)	Ag2r–La Mondiale	s.t.
5	Nicki Sørensen (DEN)	Saxo Bank–SunGard	s.t.
6	Andreas Klier (GER)	Garmin–Cervélo	s.t.
7	Johannes Fröhlinger (GER)	Skil–Shimano	s.t.
8	Pieter Serry (BEL)	Topsport Vlaanderen–Mercator	s.t.
9	Thibaut Pinot (FRA)	FDJ	+ 3"
10	David Loosli (SUI)	Lampre–ISD	+ 1' 08"

General Classification after Stage 3

	Rider	Team	Time
1	Michael Albasini (SUI)	HTC–Highroad	14h 58' 17"
2	Geraint Thomas (GBR)	Team Sky	+ 7"
3	Wesley Sulzberger (AUS)	FDJ	s.t.
4	Johannes Fröhlinger (GER)	Skil–Shimano	+ 12"
5	Andreas Klier (GER)	Garmin–Cervélo	s.t.
6	Nicki Sørensen (DEN)	Saxo Bank–SunGard	s.t.
7	Blel Kadri (FRA)	Ag2r–La Mondiale	+ 13"
8	Pieter Serry (BEL)	Topsport Vlaanderen–Mercator	s.t.
9	Thibaut Pinot (FRA)	FDJ	+ 16"
10	David Loosli (SUI)	Lampre–ISD	+ 1' 21"

=== Stage 4 ===
28 May 2011 – Friedberg, 26.0 km (16.2 mi) individual time trial (ITT)

Stage 4 Result

	Rider	Team	Time
1	Bradley Wiggins (GBR)	Team Sky	30' 08"
2	Fabian Cancellara (SUI)	Leopard Trek	+ 32"
3	Edvald Boasson Hagen (NOR)	Team Sky	+ 45"
4	Adriano Malori (ITA)	Lampre–ISD	+ 50"
5	Geraint Thomas (GBR)	Team Sky	+ 1' 03"
6	Nicki Sørensen (DEN)	Saxo Bank–SunGard	+ 1' 17"
7	Yoann Offredo (FRA)	FDJ	+1' 20"
8	Jarosław Marycz (POL)	Saxo Bank–SunGard	+1' 24"
9	Jan Ghyselinck (BEL)	HTC–Highroad	+ 1' 28"
10	Michael Albasini (SUI)	HTC–Highroad	+ 1' 33"

General Classification after Stage 4

	Rider	Team	Time
1	Geraint Thomas (GBR)	Team Sky	15h 29' 36"
2	Nicki Sørensen (DEN)	Saxo Bank–SunGard	+ 19"
3	Michael Albasini (SUI)	HTC–Highroad	+ 23"
4	Blel Kadri (FRA)	Ag2r–La Mondiale	+ 1' 23"
5	Andreas Klier (GER)	Garmin–Cervélo	+ 1' 26"
6	Johannes Fröhlinger (GER)	Skil–Shimano	+ 1' 46"
7	Thibaut Pinot (FRA)	FDJ	+ 1' 47"
8	Wesley Sulzberger (AUS)	FDJ	+ 1' 53"
9	Pieter Serry (BEL)	Topsport Vlaanderen–Mercator	+ 2' 11"
10	David Loosli (SUI)	Lampre–ISD	+ 3' 25"

=== Stage 5 ===
29 May 2011 – Friedberg to Moosburg, 162.1 km (100.7 mi)

Stage 5 Result

	Rider	Team	Time
1	Giacomo Nizzolo (ITA)	Leopard Trek	3h 40' 00"
2	John Degenkolb (GER)	HTC–Highroad	s.t.
3	Edvald Boasson Hagen (NOR)	Team Sky	s.t.
4	André Schulze (GER)	CCC–Polsat–Polkowice	s.t.
5	Grega Bole (SLO)	Lampre–ISD	s.t.
6	Roger Kluge (GER)	Skil–Shimano	s.t.
7	Grischa Janorschke (GER)	Team Nutrixxion–Sparkasse	s.t.
8	Patrick Bercz (GER)	Team Eddy Merckx–Indeland	s.t.
9	Koldo Fernández (ESP)	Euskaltel–Euskadi	s.t.
10	Tino Thömel (GER)	Team NSP	s.t.

Final General Classification

	Rider	Team	Time
1	Geraint Thomas (GBR)	Team Sky	19h 09' 36"
2	Nicki Sørensen (DEN)	Saxo Bank–SunGard	+ 17"
3	Michael Albasini (SUI)	HTC–Highroad	+ 19"
4	Blel Kadri (FRA)	Ag2r–La Mondiale	+ 1' 23"
5	Andreas Klier (GER)	Garmin–Cervélo	+ 1' 26"
6	Johannes Fröhlinger (GER)	Skil–Shimano	+ 1' 46"
7	Thibaut Pinot (FRA)	FDJ	+ 1' 47"
8	Wesley Sulzberger (AUS)	FDJ	+ 1' 53"
9	Pieter Serry (BEL)	Topsport Vlaanderen–Mercator	+ 2' 11"
10	David Loosli (SUI)	Lampre–ISD	+ 3' 25"

== Classification leadership ==
Stage	Winner	General classification	Points classification	Mountains classification	Young rider classification	Team classification
1	Edvald Boasson Hagen	Edvald Boasson Hagen	Edvald Boasson Hagen	Maxime Bouet	Edvald Boasson Hagen	Lampre–ISD
2	John Degenkolb	Edvald Boasson Hagen	Edvald Boasson Hagen	Matthias Berteling	Edvald Boasson Hagen	Team Sky
3	Michael Albasini	Michael Albasini	Maxime Bouet	Pieter Serry	Pieter Serry	Team Sky
4	Bradley Wiggins	Geraint Thomas	Maxime Bouet	Pieter Serry	Thibaut Pinot	Team Sky
5	Giacomo Nizzolo	Geraint Thomas	Edvald Boasson Hagen	Pieter Serry	Thibaut Pinot	Team Sky
Final		Geraint Thomas	Edvald Boasson Hagen	Pieter Serry	Thibaut Pinot	Team Sky

== Final standings ==
=== General classification ===
	Rider	Team	Time
1	Geraint Thomas (GBR)	Team Sky	19h 09' 36"
2	Nicki Sørensen (DEN)	Saxo Bank–SunGard	+ 17"
3	Michael Albasini (SUI)	HTC–Highroad	+ 19"
4	Blel Kadri (FRA)	Ag2r–La Mondiale	+ 1' 23"
5	Andreas Klier (GER)	Garmin–Cervélo	+ 1' 26"
6	Johannes Fröhlinger (GER)	Skil–Shimano	+ 1' 46"
7	Thibaut Pinot (FRA)	FDJ	+ 1' 47"
8	Wesley Sulzberger (AUS)	FDJ	+ 1' 53"
9	Pieter Serry (BEL)	Topsport Vlaanderen–Mercator	+ 2' 11"
10	David Loosli (SUI)	Lampre–ISD	+ 3' 25"

=== Points classification ===
	Rider	Team	Points
1	Edvald Boasson Hagen (NOR)	Team Sky	14
2	Michael Albasini (SUI)	HTC–Highroad	12
3	Jarosław Marycz (POL)	Saxo Bank–SunGard	12
4	Maxime Bouet (FRA)	Ag2r–La Mondiale	11
5	John Degenkolb (GER)	HTC–Highroad	9
6	André Schulze (GER)	CCC–Polsat–Polkowice	6
7	Giacomo Nizzolo (ITA)	Leopard Trek	5
8	Sander Armée (BEL)	Topsport Vlaanderen–Mercator	5
9	Wesley Sulzberger (AUS)	FDJ	5
10	Markus Eichler (GER)	Team NSP	4

=== Mountains classification ===
	Rider	Team	Points
1	Pieter Serry (BEL)	Topsport Vlaanderen–Mercator	10
2	Fabian Wegmann (GER)	Leopard Trek	8
3	Tony Hurel (FRA)	Team Europcar	6
4	Maxime Bouet (FRA)	Ag2r–La Mondiale	5
5	Gatis Smukulis (LAT)	HTC–Highroad	5
6	Sander Armée (BEL)	Topsport Vlaanderen–Mercator	4
7	Jarosław Marycz (POL)	Saxo Bank–SunGard	3
8	Markus Eichler (GER)	Team NSP	3
9	Preben Van Hecke (BEL)	Topsport Vlaanderen–Mercator	2
10	Bradley Wiggins (GBR)	Team Sky	1

=== Young rider classification ===
	Rider	Team	Time
1	Thibaut Pinot (FRA)	Team Europcar	19h 11' 23"
2	Pieter Serry (BEL)	Topsport Vlaanderen–Mercator	+ 24"
3	Edvald Boasson Hagen (NOR)	Team Sky	+ 2' 58"
4	Adriano Malori (ITA)	Lampre–ISD	+ 3' 24"
5	Jarosław Marycz (POL)	Saxo Bank–SunGard	+ 4' 10"
6	Ramūnas Navardauskas (LIT)	Garmin–Cervélo	+ 4' 21"
7	John Degenkolb (GER)	HTC–Highroad	+ 4' 30"
8	Tony Hurel (FRA)	Team Europcar	+ 6' 10"
9	Mikel Landa (ESP)	Euskaltel–Euskadi	+ 7' 02"
10	Michael Schwarzmann (GER)	Team NetApp	+ 9' 23"

=== Team classification ===
Pos.	Team	Time
1	Team Sky	57h 38' 20"
2	Saxo Bank–SunGard	+ 2' 28"
3	HTC–Highroad	+ 2' 59"
4	Ag2r–La Mondiale	+ 3' 27"
5	Garmin–Cervélo	+ 4' 52"
6	Skil–Shimano	+ 5' 29"
7	Lampre–ISD	+ 5' 30"
8	FDJ	+ 7' 04"
9	Topsport Vlaanderen–Mercator	+ 7' 28"
10	Leopard Trek	+ 8' 54"
