= Wiesenhof–Felt =

Team Wiesenhof
Team information
- UCI code: WIE
- Registered: Germany
- Founded: 2001
- Disbanded: 2007
- Discipline: Road
- Status: UCI Professional Continental (2002-2004, 2006); UCI Continental (2001, 2005, 2007)

Key personnel
- General manager: Raphael Schweda

Team name history
- 2001 2002-2005 2006 2007: Wiesenhof-Leipzig; Team Wiesenhof; Wiesenhof-AKUD; Wiesenhof-Felt
Jersey

Team Wiesenhof was a professional continental cycling team based in Germany that participated in UCI Continental Circuits races and was selected as a wildcard to UCI ProTour events. The team was managed by Raphael Schweda with assistance from directeur sportifs Hahn Jochen, Markus Schleicher, and Jens Heppner. In 2007, the main sponsor Wiesenhof pulled its sponsorship, ending the team.

== Final Roster (2007) ==
As of 1 January 2007

Rider	Date of birth
Artur Gajek (GER)	18 April 1985 (aged 21)
Bas Giling (NED)	4 November 1982 (aged 24)
Christian Leben (GER)	6 April 1985 (aged 21)
Jörg Ludewig (GER)	9 September 1975 (aged 31)
Daniel Musiol (GER)	27 March 1983 (aged 23)
Ralph Näf (SUI)	10 May 1980 (aged 26)
Felix Odebrecht (GER)	15 September 1984 (aged 22)
Olaf Pollack (GER)	20 September 1973 (aged 33)
Steffen Radochla (GER)	19 October 1978 (aged 28)

Rider	Date of birth
Robert Retschke (GER)	17 December 1980 (aged 26)
Torsten Schmidt (GER)	18 February 1972 (aged 34)
André Schulze (GER)	21 November 1974 (aged 32)
Stefan van Dijk (NED)	22 January 1976 (aged 30)
Martin Velits (SVK)	21 February 1985 (aged 21)
Peter Velits (SVK)	21 February 1985 (aged 21)
Robert Wagner (GER)	17 April 1983 (aged 23)
Steffen Wesemann (SUI)	11 March 1971 (aged 35)

== Major wins ==
2001
Overall Ringerike GP, Enrico Poitschke

Stages 3 & 5, Enrico Poitschke

Stage 4 Peace Race, Enrico Poitschke
Stage 2 Flèche du Sud, Enrico Nikola
2002
No Recorded Wins
2003
Stages 5 & 7 Circuit de Lorraine, Björn Schröder
Rund um die Hainleite, Enrico Poitschke
Course de Solidarność et des Champions Olympiques

Stage 2, Eric Baumann
Stage 7, Roberto Lochowski

Prologue Sachsen Tour, Roberto Lochowski
2004
Peace Race

Stage 1, Lars Wackernagel
Stage 3, Sebastian Siedler

Stage 5 Sachsen Tour, Björn Schröder
International Hessen Rundfahrt

Stage 2, Roberto Lochowski
Stage 5, Sebastian Siedler

Rund um die Nürnberger Altstadt, Sebastian Siedler
2005
Stage 1 Giro del Capo, David Kopp
Rund um Köln, David Kopp
Stage 3 Bayern Rundfahrt, David Kopp
Stage 3 Sachsen Tour, Björn Schröder
Stage 6 Danmark Rundt, André Greipel
2006
Stages 3 & 5 Giro del Capo, Steffen Radochla
Stage 3 Istrian Spring Trophy, Gerald Ciolek
Peace Race

Stage 7, Lubor Tesař
Stage 8, Torsten Schmidt

Stage 2 Bayern Rundfahrt, Gerhard Trampusch
Stage 3 Deutschland Tour, Gerald Ciolek
Stage 3 Tour Poitou-Charentes en Nouvelle-Aquitaine, Steffen Radochla
Rund um den Sachsenring, Artur Gajek
Grote Prijs Jef Scherens, Marcel Sieberg
Rund um die Nürnberger Altstadt, Gerald Ciolek
Omloop van het Houtland, Artur Gajek
2007
Veenendaal–Veenendaal, Steffen Radochla
Stage 1 Critérium International, Olaf Pollack
Stage 1 Bayern Rundfahrt, André Schulze
Tour of Qinghai Lake

Stage 2, André Schulze
Stage 4, Jörg Ludewig

Grand Prix de Fourmies, Peter Velits

== National and World Champions ==
2006
Road race, UCI Under-23 Road World Championships, Gerald Ciolek
2007
Road race, UCI Under-23 Road World Championships, Peter Velits
