= 2013 Bayern Rundfahrt =

2013 UCI Europe Tour

Race details
- Dates: 22–26 May
- Stages: 5

Results
Jersey awarded to the overall winner	Winner	Adriano Malori (ITA)	(Lampre–Merida)
	Second	Geraint Thomas (GBR)	(Team Sky)
	Third	Jan Bárta (CZE)	(NetApp–Endura)
Jersey awarded to the points classification winner	Points	Grischa Janorschke (GER)	(Nutrixxion–Abus)
Jersey awarded to the mountains classification winner	Mountains	Stefan Denifl (AUT)	(IAM Cycling)
Jersey awarded to the youth classification winner	Youth	Diego Ulissi (ITA)	(Lampre–Merida)
	Team	IAM Cycling	

The 2013 Bayern Rundfahrt was the 34th edition of the Bayern Rundfahrt, an annual cycling road race. Departing from on 22 May, it concluded on 26 May. The stage race was part of the 2013 UCI Europe Tour, and was rated as a 2.HC event.

== Stages ==
=== Stage 1 ===
22 May 2013 – Pfaffenhofen an der Ilm to Mühldorf, 193.1 km (120.0 mi)

Stage 1 Result

	Rider	Team	Time
1	Alex Rasmussen (DEN)	Garmin–Sharp	4h 34' 05"
2	Ben Swift (GBR)	Team Sky	s.t.
3	Juan José Lobato (ESP)	Euskaltel–Euskadi	s.t.
4	Gerald Ciolek (GER)	MTN–Qhubeka	s.t.
5	Davide Cimolai (ITA)	Lampre–Merida	s.t.
6	Nikias Arndt (GER)	Argos–Shimano	s.t.
7	Andreas Schillinger (GER)	NetApp–Endura	s.t.
8	Geraint Thomas (GBR)	Team Sky	s.t.
9	Manuele Mori (ITA)	Lampre–Merida	s.t.
10	Johannes Weber (GER)	Team Heizomat	s.t.

General Classification after Stage 1

	Rider	Team	Time
1	Alex Rasmussen (DEN)	Garmin–Sharp	4h 33' 55"
2	Ben Swift (GBR)	Team Sky	+ 4"
3	Grischa Janorschke (GER)	Nutrixxion–Abus	+ 4"
4	Juan José Lobato (ESP)	Euskaltel–Euskadi	+ 6"
5	Adriano Malori (ITA)	Lampre–Merida	+ 8"
6	Gerald Ciolek (GER)	MTN–Qhubeka	+ 10"
7	Davide Cimolai (ITA)	Lampre–Merida	+ 10"
8	Nikias Arndt (GER)	Argos–Shimano	+ 10"
9	Andreas Schillinger (GER)	NetApp–Endura	+ 10"
10	Geraint Thomas (GBR)	Team Sky	+ 10"

=== Stage 2 ===
23 May 2013 – Mühldorf to Viechtach, 192.6 km (119.7 mi)

Stage 2 Result

	Rider	Team	Time
1	Daryl Impey (RSA)	Orica–GreenEDGE	4h 41' 30"
2	Gerald Ciolek (GER)	MTN–Qhubeka	s.t.
3	Adriano Malori (ITA)	Lampre–Merida	s.t.
4	Diego Ulissi (ITA)	Lampre–Merida	s.t.
5	Romain Bardet (FRA)	Ag2r–La Mondiale	s.t.
6	Michel Kreder (NED)	Garmin–Sharp	s.t.
7	Martin Elmiger (SUI)	IAM Cycling	s.t.
8	Geraint Thomas (GBR)	Team Sky	s.t.
9	John Gadret (FRA)	Ag2r–La Mondiale	s.t.
10	Christophe Riblon (FRA)	Ag2r–La Mondiale	s.t.

General Classification after Stage 2

	Rider	Team	Time
1	Daryl Impey (RSA)	Orica–GreenEDGE	9h 15' 25"
2	Adriano Malori (ITA)	Lampre–Merida	+ 3"
3	Gerald Ciolek (GER)	MTN–Qhubeka	+ 4"
4	Ben Swift (GBR)	Team Sky	+ 4"
5	Geraint Thomas (GBR)	Team Sky	+ 7"
6	Christophe Riblon (FRA)	Ag2r–La Mondiale	+ 7"
7	Maxime Bouet (FRA)	Ag2r–La Mondiale	+ 8"
8	Marcel Wyss (SUI)	IAM Cycling	+ 9"
9	Romain Bardet (FRA)	Ag2r–La Mondiale	+ 10"
10	Michel Kreder (NED)	Garmin–Sharp	+ 10"

=== Stage 3 ===
24 May 2013 – Viechtach to Kelheim, 196.8 km (122.3 mi)

Stage 3 Result

	Rider	Team	Time
1	Gerald Ciolek (GER)	MTN–Qhubeka	5h 10' 15"
2	Arnaud Démare (FRA)	FDJ	s.t.
3	Heinrich Haussler (AUS)	IAM Cycling	s.t.
4	Ben Swift (GBR)	Team Sky	s.t.
5	Davide Cimolai (ITA)	Lampre–Merida	s.t.
6	Aidis Kruopis (LTU)	Orica–GreenEDGE	s.t.
7	Cyril Lemoine (FRA)	Sojasun	s.t.
8	Robert Wagner (GER)	Blanco Pro Cycling	s.t.
9	Raymond Kreder (NED)	Garmin–Sharp	s.t.
10	Yohann Gène (FRA)	Team Europcar	s.t.

General Classification after Stage 3

	Rider	Team	Time
1	Gerald Ciolek (GER)	MTN–Qhubeka	14h 25' 34"
2	Daryl Impey (RSA)	Orica–GreenEDGE	+ 6"
3	Adriano Malori (ITA)	Lampre–Merida	+ 9"
4	Ben Swift (GBR)	Team Sky	+ 10"
5	Heinrich Haussler (AUS)	IAM Cycling	+ 12"
6	Geraint Thomas (GBR)	Team Sky	+ 13"
7	Christophe Riblon (FRA)	Ag2r–La Mondiale	+ 13"
8	Simon Geschke (GER)	Argos–Shimano	+ 13"
9	Maxime Bouet (FRA)	Ag2r–La Mondiale	+ 14"
10	Marcel Wyss (SUI)	IAM Cycling	+ 15"

=== Stage 4 ===
25 May 2013 – Schierling, 31.2 km (19.4 mi) individual time trial (ITT)

Stage 4 Result

	Rider	Team	Time
1	Adriano Malori (ITA)	Lampre–Merida	38' 19"
2	Jasha Sütterlin (GER)	Thüringer Energie Team	+ 18"
3	Jan Bárta (CZE)	NetApp–Endura	+ 19"
4	Geraint Thomas (GBR)	Team Sky	+ 19"
5	Jérémy Roy (FRA)	FDJ	+ 26"
6	Simon Geschke (GER)	Argos–Shimano	+ 29"
7	Diego Ulissi (ITA)	Lampre–Merida	+ 36"
8	Ian Stannard (GBR)	Team Sky	+ 37"
9	Marcel Wyss (SUI)	IAM Cycling	+ 42"
10	Ignatas Konovalovas (LTU)	MTN–Qhubeka	+ 49"

General Classification after Stage 4

	Rider	Team	Time
1	Adriano Malori (ITA)	Lampre–Merida	15h 04' 02"
2	Geraint Thomas (GBR)	Team Sky	+ 23"
3	Jan Bárta (CZE)	NetApp–Endura	+ 26"
4	Jérémy Roy (FRA)	FDJ	+ 33"
5	Simon Geschke (GER)	Argos–Shimano	+ 33"
6	Diego Ulissi (ITA)	Lampre–Merida	+ 43"
7	Marcel Wyss (SUI)	IAM Cycling	+ 48"
8	Ian Stannard (GBR)	Team Sky	+ 59"
9	Martin Elmiger (SUI)	IAM Cycling	+ 1' 02"
10	Gerald Ciolek (GER)	MTN–Qhubeka	+ 1' 13"

=== Stage 5 ===
26 May 2013 – Kelheim to Nuremberg, 169.8 km (105.5 mi)

Stage 5 Result

	Rider	Team	Time
1	Heinrich Haussler (AUS)	IAM Cycling	4h 24' 18"
2	Juan José Lobato (ESP)	Euskaltel–Euskadi	s.t.
3	Yauheni Hutarovich (BLR)	Ag2r–La Mondiale	s.t.
4	Robert Wagner (GER)	Blanco Pro Cycling	s.t.
5	Michael Schwarzmann (GER)	NetApp–Endura	s.t.
6	Gerald Ciolek (GER)	MTN–Qhubeka	s.t.
7	Arnaud Démare (FRA)	FDJ	s.t.
8	Jack Bauer (NZL)	Garmin–Sharp	s.t.
9	Cyril Gautier (FRA)	Team Europcar	s.t.
10	Benjamin Sydlik (GER)	Nutrixxion–Abus	s.t.

Final General Classification

	Rider	Team	Time
1	Adriano Malori (ITA)	Lampre–Merida	19h 28' 20"
2	Geraint Thomas (GBR)	Team Sky	+ 23"
3	Jan Bárta (CZE)	NetApp–Endura	+ 26"
4	Jérémy Roy (FRA)	FDJ	+ 33"
5	Simon Geschke (GER)	Argos–Shimano	+ 33"
6	Diego Ulissi (ITA)	Lampre–Merida	+ 43"
7	Marcel Wyss (SUI)	IAM Cycling	+ 48"
8	Ian Stannard (GBR)	Team Sky	+ 59"
9	Martin Elmiger (SUI)	IAM Cycling	+ 1' 02"
10	Gerald Ciolek (GER)	MTN–Qhubeka	+ 1' 13"

== Classification leadership ==
Stage	Winner	General classification	Points classification	Mountains classification	Young rider classification	Team classification
1	Alex Rasmussen	Alex Rasmussen	Henning Bommel	Grischa Janorschke	Davide Cimolai	Garmin–Sharp
2	Daryl Impey	Daryl Impey	Henning Bommel	Stefan Denifl	Romain Bardet	Ag2r–La Mondiale
3	Gerald Ciolek	Gerald Ciolek	Gerald Ciolek	Stefan Denifl	Romain Bardet	Ag2r–La Mondiale
4	Adriano Malori	Adriano Malori	Gerald Ciolek	Stefan Denifl	Diego Ulissi	IAM Cycling
5	Heinrich Haussler	Adriano Malori	Grischa Janorschke	Stefan Denifl	Diego Ulissi	IAM Cycling
Final		Adriano Malori	Grischa Janorschke	Stefan Denifl	Diego Ulissi	IAM Cycling

=== General Classification ===
	Rider	Team	Time
1	Adriano Malori (ITA)	Lampre–Merida	19h 28' 20"
2	Geraint Thomas (GBR)	Team Sky	+ 23"
3	Jan Bárta (CZE)	NetApp–Endura	+ 26"
4	Jérémy Roy (FRA)	FDJ	+ 33"
5	Simon Geschke (GER)	Argos–Shimano	+ 33"
6	Diego Ulissi (ITA)	Lampre–Merida	+ 43"
7	Marcel Wyss (SUI)	IAM Cycling	+ 47"
8	Ian Stannard (GBR)	Team Sky	+ 59"
9	Martin Elmiger (SUI)	IAM Cycling	+ 1' 02"
10	Gerald Ciolek (GER)	MTN–Qhubeka	+ 1' 13"
