= Steffen Radochla =

German former road cyclist (born 1978)

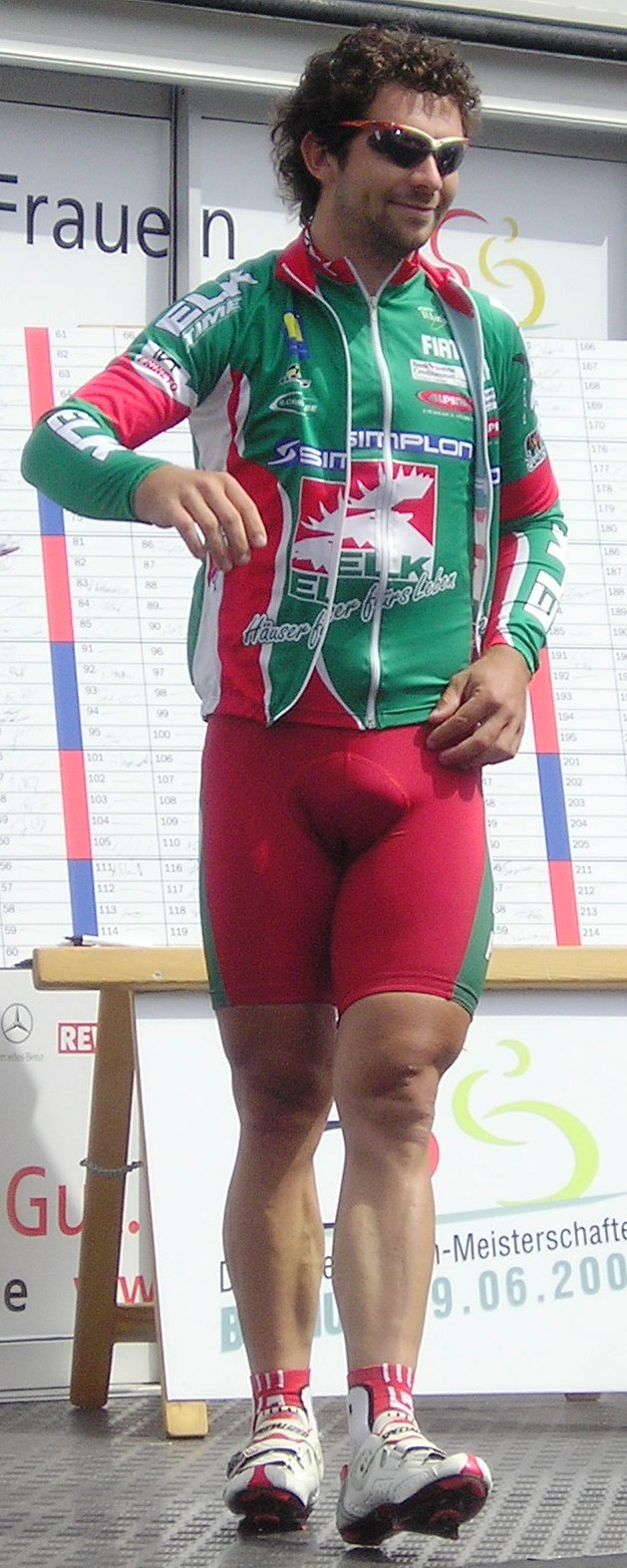
- Radochla at the 2008 DM Straße.

Personal information
- Full name: Steffen Radochla
- Born: 19 October 1978 (age 47) Leipzig, East Germany

Cycling career
- Sport: Cycling
- Discipline: Road
- Role: Rider

Amateur team
- 2000: Bunte Berte Leipzig

Professional teams
- 2001: Festina
- 2002–2003: Team Coast
- 2004: Illes Balears–Banesto
- 2005–2007: Team Wiesenhof
- 2008–2009: Elk Haus–Simplon
- 2010–2011: Team Nutrixxion–Sparkasse
- 2012: Team NSP–Ghost
- 2013: Euskaltel–Euskadi

Steffen Radochla (born 19 October 1978 in Leipzig) is a German former road cyclist, who was professional from 2001 until 2013. He last rode for the Euskaltel–Euskadi team.

== Major results ==
2000
1st Rund um Berlin
1st Stage 1 Sachsen-Tour
2001
1st Stage 2 Étoile de Bessèges
3rd Grand Prix de la Ville de Lillers
2002
1st Memorial Rik Van Steenbergen
1st Henk Vos Memorial
1st Stage 4a Hessen Rundfahrt
1st Stage 5 Sachsen-Tour
4th Overall Circuit Franco-Belge
2003
1st Stage 1 Österreich Rundfahrt
3rd Scheldeprijs
5th Rund um Köln
2005
4th Neuseen Classics
5th GP Herning
6th Scheldeprijs
6th Nokere-Koerse
9th Ronde van Midden-Zeeland
9th GP Aarhus
2006
1st Stages 3 & 5 Giro del Capo
1st Stage 3 Tour du Poitou Charentes
1st Points classification Tour de Langkawi
2nd Veenendaal–Veenendaal
3rd Memorial Rik Van Steenbergen
5th Omloop van de Vlaamse Scheldeboorden
6th Neuseen Classics
7th Ronde van Drenthe
2007
1st Dutch Food Valley Classic
1st Stage 2 Rheinland-Pfalz Rundfahrt
2nd Neuseen Classics
4th Ronde van het Groene Hart
5th Sparkassen Münsterland Giro
6th Ronde van Midden-Zeeland
2008
1st Neuseen Classics
1st Stage 5 Szlakiem Grodow Piastowskich
3rd Rund um die Nürnberger Altstadt
2009
8th Neuseen Classics
2010
1st Stage 4 Volta ao Alentejo
2nd Road race, National Road Championships
2nd Neuseen Classics
3rd Rund um Düren
4th Ronde van Noord-Holland
7th Beverbeek Classic
2011
2nd Neuseen Classics
4th Overall Course de Solidarność et des Champions Olympiques

1st Stage 4

6th Ster van Zwolle
7th Sparkassen Münsterland Giro
2012
1st Puchar Uzdrowisk Karpackich
1st Mountains classification Bayern Rundfahrt
3rd Memoriał Henryka Łasaka
5th Neuseen Classics
9th GP Stad Zottegem
2013
7th Kampioenschap van Vlaanderen
