= Nutrixxion–Abus =

Nutrixxion–ABUS
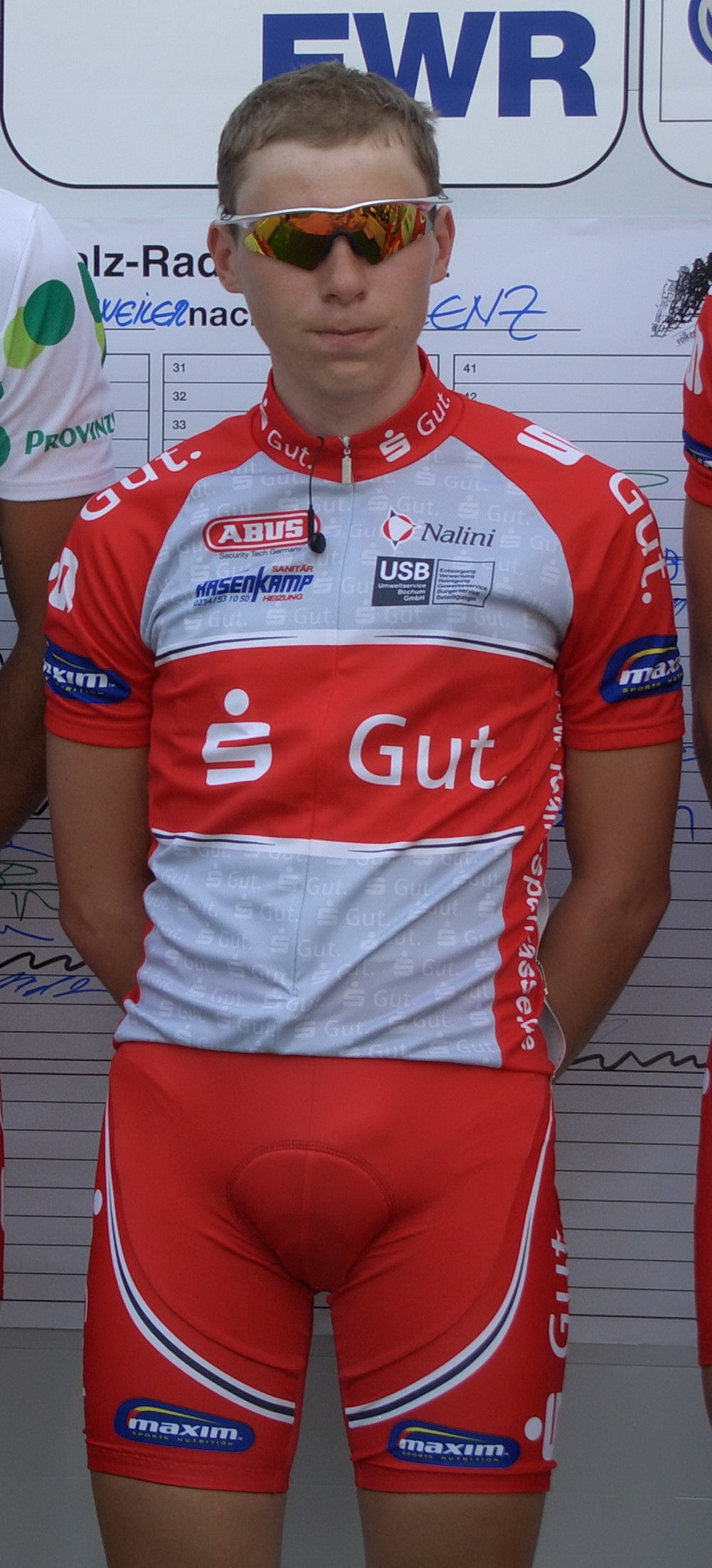

Team information
- UCI code: TSP
- Registered: Germany
- Founded: 2005
- Disbanded: 2013
- Discipline: Road
- Status: Continental (2005–2013)
- Bicycles: Red Bull Bikes (2005–2009); Basso (2010); Corratec (2011–2012); KTM (2013)

Key personnel
- General manager: Mark Claussmeyer
- Team manager: Viktor Hamann

Team name history
- 2005–2008 2009–2010 2011 2012–2013: Team Sparkasse; Team Nutrixxion–Sparkasse; Nutrixxion–Sparkasse; Nutrixxion–ABUS
Jersey

Nutrixxion–Abus (UCI team code: TSP) was a German UCI Continental cycling team that existed from 2005 until 2013. CCS Germany GmbH, a limited liability company, owned Nutrixxion–Abus. The team was managed by Mark Claussmeyer and used KTM bicycles.

== Major wins ==
2005
Stage 4 Cinturón a Mallorca, André Schulze
Stage 3a Five Rings of Moscow, André Schulze
Stage 7 Tour de l'Avenir, Alexander Gottfried
2006
Stage 3 Cinturón a Mallorca, Stefan Parinussa
Stage 4 Thüringen Rundfahrt, Mark Cavendish
Stage 1 Flèche du Sud, Tom Flammang
Stages 4 & 5 Flèche du Sud, Stefan Parinussa
Stages 4 & 5 Tour de Berlin, Mark Cavendish
Stage 4b Tour de Beauce, Richard Faltus
Stage 3 Course de la Solidarité Olympique, Mark Cavendish
2007
Overall Cinturón a Mallorca, Richard Faltus
Stage 5 Course de la Solidarité Olympique, Tilo Schüler
2008
Overall Cinturón a Mallorca, Dirk Müller

Stage 5, Dirk Müller

Overall GP of Sochi, Dirk Müller

Stages 1 & 3, Dirk Müller

Stage 5 Tour de Beauce, Andreas Schillinger
Stage 4 GP Torres Vedras, Richard Faltus
Stage 5 GP Torres Vedras, Dirk Müller
Sparkassen Giro Bochum, Eric Baumann
Praha-Karlovy Vary-Praha, Eric Baumann
2009
Beverbeek Classic, Andreas Schillinger
Stages 1b & 2 Five Rings of Moscow, Eric Baumann
Stage 5 Five Rings of Moscow, Andreas Schillinger
Stage 4 GP CTT Correios de Portugal, Eric Baumann
2010
Stage 4 Volta ao Alentejo, Steffen Radochla
Pomerania Tour, Dirk Müller
Overall Dookoła Mazowsza, Sebastian Forke

Stages 1, 2, 3 & 4, Sebastian Forke

Overall Tour of China, Dirk Müller

Prologue & Stage 5, Dirk Müller

Stage 3 Tour de Seoul, Grischa Janorschke
2011
Overall GP of Sochi, Björn Schröder

Stage 1, Grischa Janorschke

Stage 4 Course de la Solidarité Olympique, Steffen Radochla
Stage 5 Tour de Bulgaria, Erik Mohs
2012
Stage 2 Five Rings of Moscow, Michael Schweizer
Stage 6 Tour of Taihu Lake, Sebastian Körber

== 2013 squad ==
As of 18 January 2013.

Rider	Date of birth
Rick Ampler (GER)	26 November 1989 (age 36)
Holger Burkhardt (GER)	16 December 1987 (age 38)
Tobias Dohlus (GER)	15 November 1988 (age 37)
Alexander Gottfried (GER)	5 July 1985 (age 41)
Grischa Janorschke (GER)	30 May 1987 (age 39)

Rider	Date of birth
Sebastian Körber (GER)	1 March 1984 (age 42)
Dirk Müller (GER)	4 August 1973 (age 53)
Alexander Schmitt (GER)	18 August 1989 (age 37)
Benjamin Sydlik (GER)	13 September 1990 (age 35)
Max Walsleben (GER)	23 June 1990 (age 36)
