= Marcel Sieberg =

Road bicycle racer

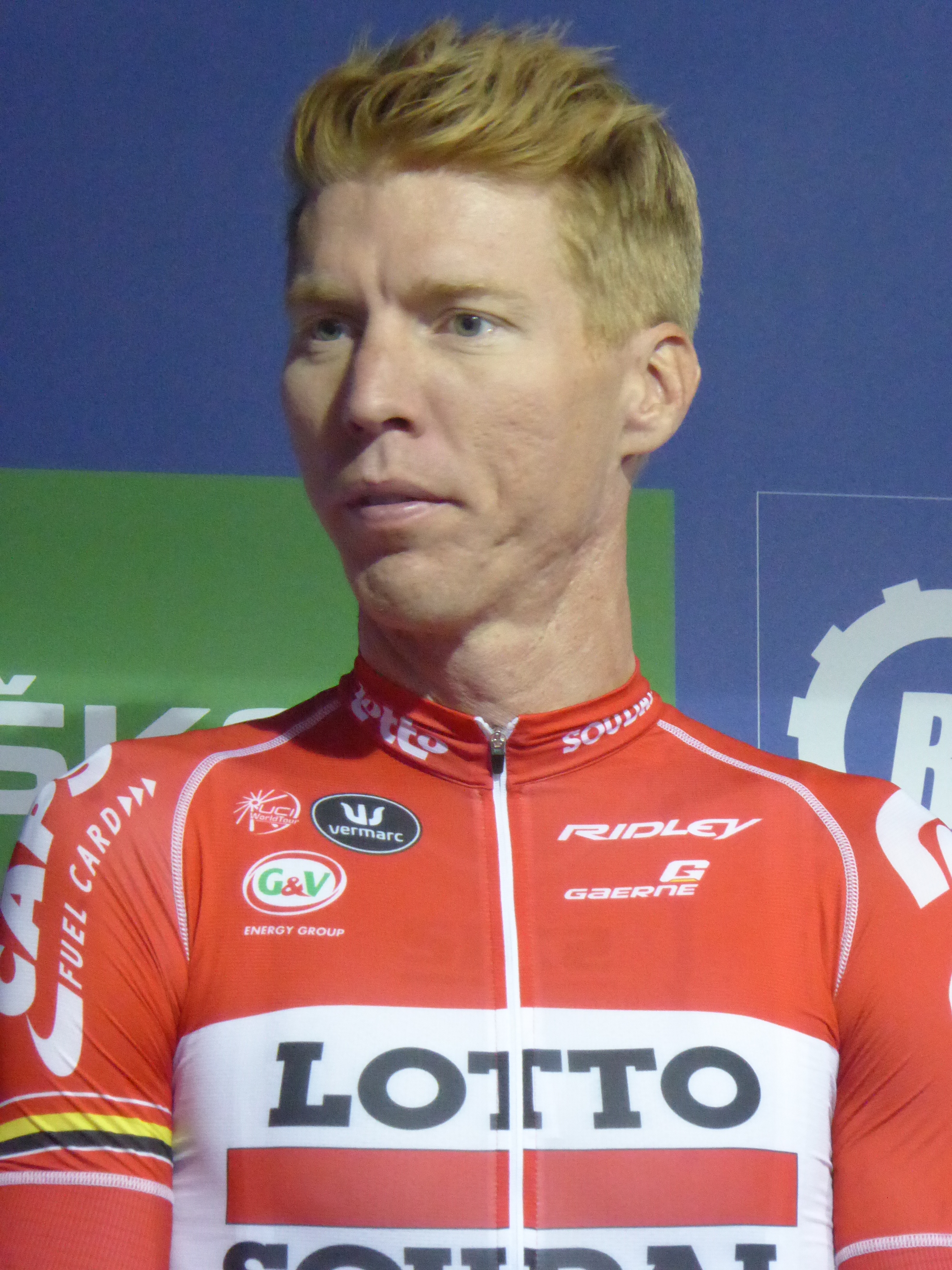
- Sieberg at the 2016 Tour of Britain

Personal information
- Full name: Marcel Sieberg
- Born: 30 April 1982 (age 44) Castrop-Rauxel, West Germany
- Height: 1.98 m (6 ft 6 in)
- Weight: 82 kg (181 lb; 12.9 st)

Cycling career
- Sport: Cycling
- Current team: Tudor Pro Cycling Team; Tudor Pro Cycling Team U23
- Discipline: Road
- Role: Rider (retired); Directeur sportif
- Rider type: Sprinter; Classics specialist; Domestique

Professional teams
- 2005: Team Lamonta
- 2006: Wiesenhof–AKUD
- 2007: Team Milram
- 2008–2010: Team High Road
- 2011–2018: Omega Pharma–Lotto
- 2019–2021: Bahrain–Merida

Managerial teams
- 2022: Team DSM (men)
- 2022: Team DSM (women)
- 2022: Development Team DSM
- 2023–: Tudor Pro Cycling Team
- 2023–: Tudor Pro Cycling Team U23

Marcel Sieberg (born 30 April 1982) is a German former road racing cyclist, who rode professionally between 2005 and 2021 for six different teams. Since his retirement, Sieberg has worked as a directeur sportif for the Team DSM squads and its Development Team DSM, and Tudor Pro Cycling Team and its development team, Tudor Pro Cycling Team U23.

Born in Castrop-Rauxel, North Rhine-Westphalia, Sieberg was, for the majority of his career, one of André Greipel's lead-out men, having been teammates at both Team HTC–Columbia (2008–2010) and then later Lotto–Soudal (2011–2018). In that role he assisted Greipel to over 100 race wins, and then took on a similar role for compatriot Phil Bauhaus over the final three years of his career at Team Bahrain Victorious (2019–2021), assisting stage wins for Bauhaus at the 2020 Tour of Saudi Arabia and the 2021 Tour de Hongrie. Individually, he took two professional victories – the 2005 Ronde van Drenthe and the 2006 Grote Prijs Jef Scherens.

== Major results ==
1998
1st Road race, National Junior Road Championships
1st Stage 2 Critérium Européens des Jeunes
2000
1st Road race, National Junior Road Championships
1st Overall Trofeo Karlsberg
1st Overall Driedaagse van Axel
1st Overall Giro di Basilicata
7th Road race, UCI Junior Road World Championships
2001
Tour de Berlin

1st Stages 1 & 4

6th Road race, UEC European Under-23 Road Championships
2002
1st Stage 5 Tour de Berlin
9th Overall Le Triptyque des Monts et Châteaux
2003
1st Dortmund-Wellinghofen
5th Eschborn–Frankfurt Under-23
2004
4th Overall Tour of South China Sea

1st Stage 3

2005
1st Ronde van Drenthe
2nd Sparkassen Giro Bochum
2nd Omloop van het Houtland
4th Tour de Rijke
4th Delta Profronde
5th Rund um die Nürnberger Altstadt
6th Omloop der Kempen
6th Grote Prijs Stad Zottegem
7th Ronde van Overijssel
9th Grand Prix Pino Cerami
2006
1st Grote Prijs Jef Scherens
3rd Münsterland Giro
5th Schaal Sels
6th Overall Driedaagse van West-Vlaanderen
7th Sparkassen Giro Bochum
10th Overall Four Days of Dunkirk
2007
2nd Kuurne–Brussels–Kuurne
4th Trofeo Cala Millor
4th Münsterland Giro
2008
2nd Profronde van Fryslan
3rd Sparkassen Giro Bochum
7th Neuseen Classics
2009
3rd Trofeo Calvia
2010
5th Omloop Het Nieuwsblad
6th Grand Prix d'Isbergues
2011
7th Grote Prijs Jef Scherens
2013
4th Grote Prijs Jef Scherens
7th Overall Ster ZLM Toer
2014
6th Overall Tour of Qatar
2015
5th Münsterland Giro
2016
3rd Grote Prijs Stad Zottegem
7th Paris–Roubaix
2018
7th Heistse Pijl

=== Grand Tour results timeline ===
Sieberg contested eleven Grand Tours during his career, including nine starts at the Tour de France.

Grand Tour general classification results timeline
Grand Tour	2007	2008	2009	2010	2011	2012	2013	2014	2015	2016	2017	2018
Giro d'Italia	—	—	—	DNF	—	—	—	—	—	—	—	—
Tour de France	119	—	—	—	139	132	DNF	145	150	169	DNF	DNF
/ Vuelta a España	—	—	122	—	—	—	—	—	—	—	—	—
