= Sebastian Forke =

German cyclist

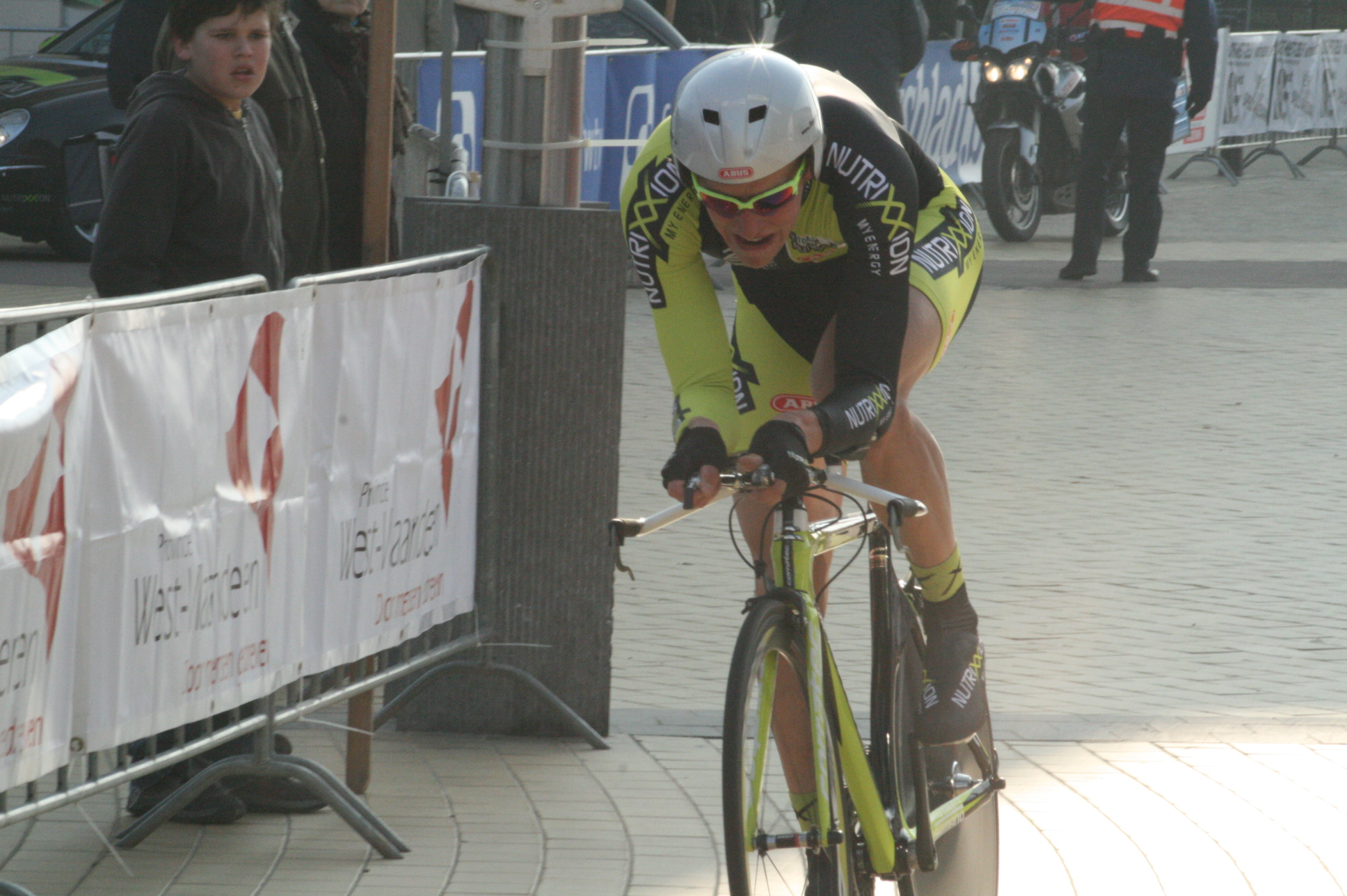
- Forke in 2011

Personal information
- Full name: Sebastian Forke
- Born: 13 March 1987 (age 39): Karl-Marx-Stadt, East Germany; (now Chemnitz, Germany)

Cycling career
- Sport: Cycling
- Current team: Retired
- Discipline: Road
- Role: Rider

Professional teams
- 2006–2007: Continental Team Milram
- 2008: Team 3C Gruppe
- 2009: LKT Team Brandenburg
- 2010–2011: Team Nutrixxion–Sparkasse
- 2012–2013: Team NSP–Ghost
- 2014: Christina Watches–Dana

Sebastian Forke (born 13 March 1987 in Karl-Marx-Stadt) is a German former professional cyclist.

== Major results ==
2007
1st Stage 1 Brandenburg-Rundfahrt
2010
1st Overall Dookoła Mazowsza

1st Stages 1, 2, 3, 4

2013
1st Stage 4 Course de la Solidarité Olympique
1st Ronde van Midden-Nederland
