= Grischa Janorschke =

German bicycle racer (born 1987)

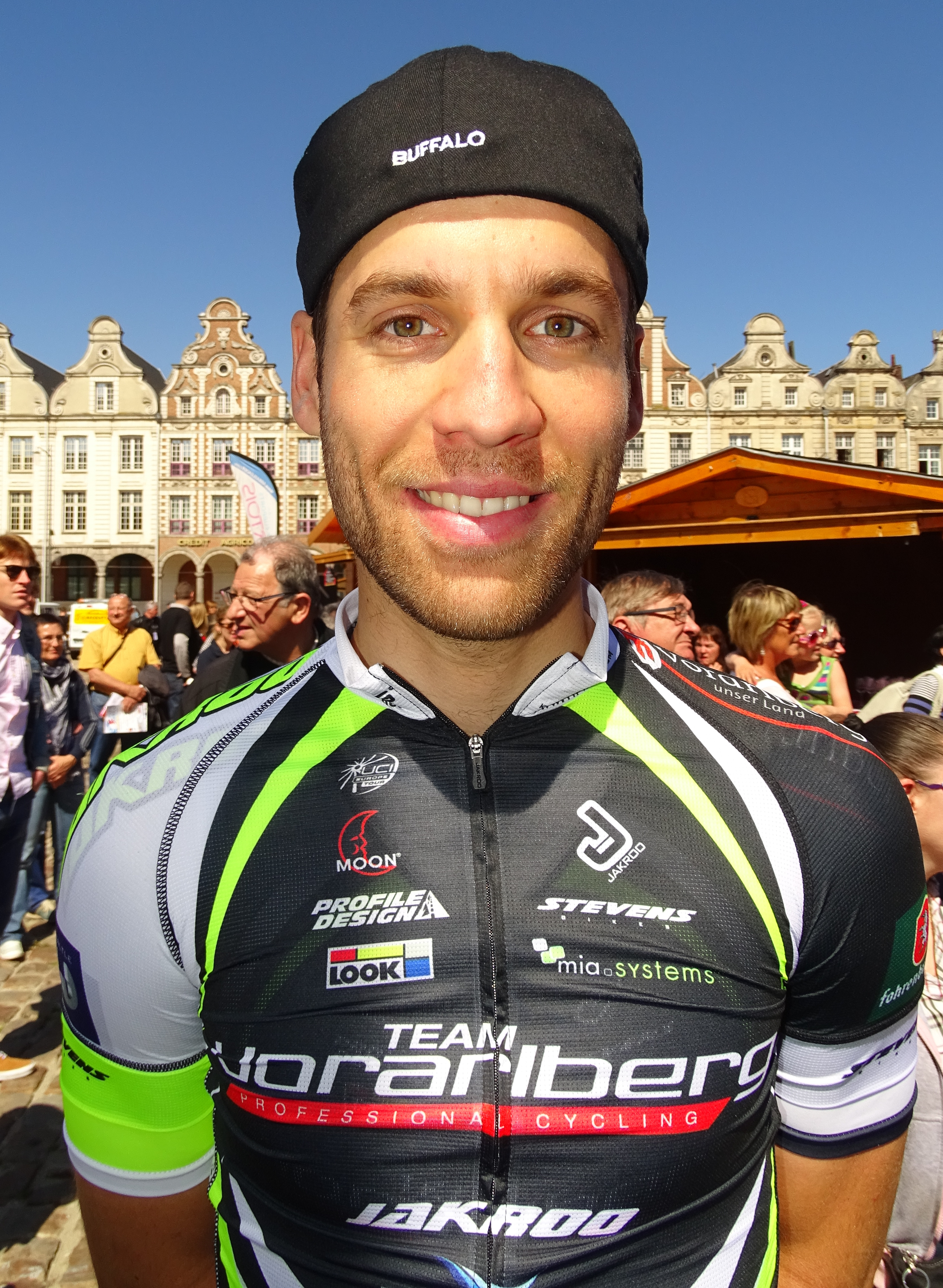
- Janorschke in 2015

Personal information
- Full name: Grischa Janorschke
- Born: 30 May 1987 (age 39): Altenkunstadt, West Germany; (now Germany)

Cycling career
- Sport: Cycling
- Current team: Retired
- Discipline: Road
- Role: Rider
- Rider type: Sprinter

Amateur teams
- 2004–2005: RV Concordia Altenkunstadt
- 2004–2006: Team Mapei Heizomat
- 2006: VFR Ansbach
- 2017: Herrmann Radteam

Professional teams
- 2007–2008: Milram Continental Team
- 2009–2011: Team Nutrixxion–Sparkasse
- 2012: Team NetApp
- 2013: Nutrixxion–Abus
- 2014–2015: Team Vorarlberg
- 2016: Team Roth

Grischa Janorschke (born 30 May 1987) is a German former professional cyclist.

== Major results ==
2007
1st Prologue Thüringen Rundfahrt der U23
9th Omloop der Kempen
2009
3rd Tour of Seoul
2010
1st Stage 3 Tour of Seoul
8th Pomerania Tour
2011
2nd Sparkassen Giro Bochum
3rd Overall Five Rings of Moscow
3rd Ster van Zwolle
4th Overall Tour of Taihu Lake
6th Overall Grand Prix of Sochi

1st Stage 1

6th Rund um Köln
6th Neuseen Classics
8th ProRace Berlin
8th Ronde van Midden-Nederland
2013
1st Points classification Bayern–Rundfahrt
3rd Zuid Oost Drenthe Classic I
4th Arno Wallaard Memorial
5th Ronde van Noord-Holland
6th Grand Prix of Moscow
6th Grote Prijs Stad Zottegem
6th Zuid Oost Drenthe Classic II
9th ProRace Berlin
2014
1st Stage 5 Tour of China I
5th Horizon Park Race Maidan
2015
6th Horizon Park Race Maidan
7th Velothon Stockholm
10th Horizon Park Race for Peace
10th Rund um Sebnitz
