= Daniel Musiol =

German bicycle racer

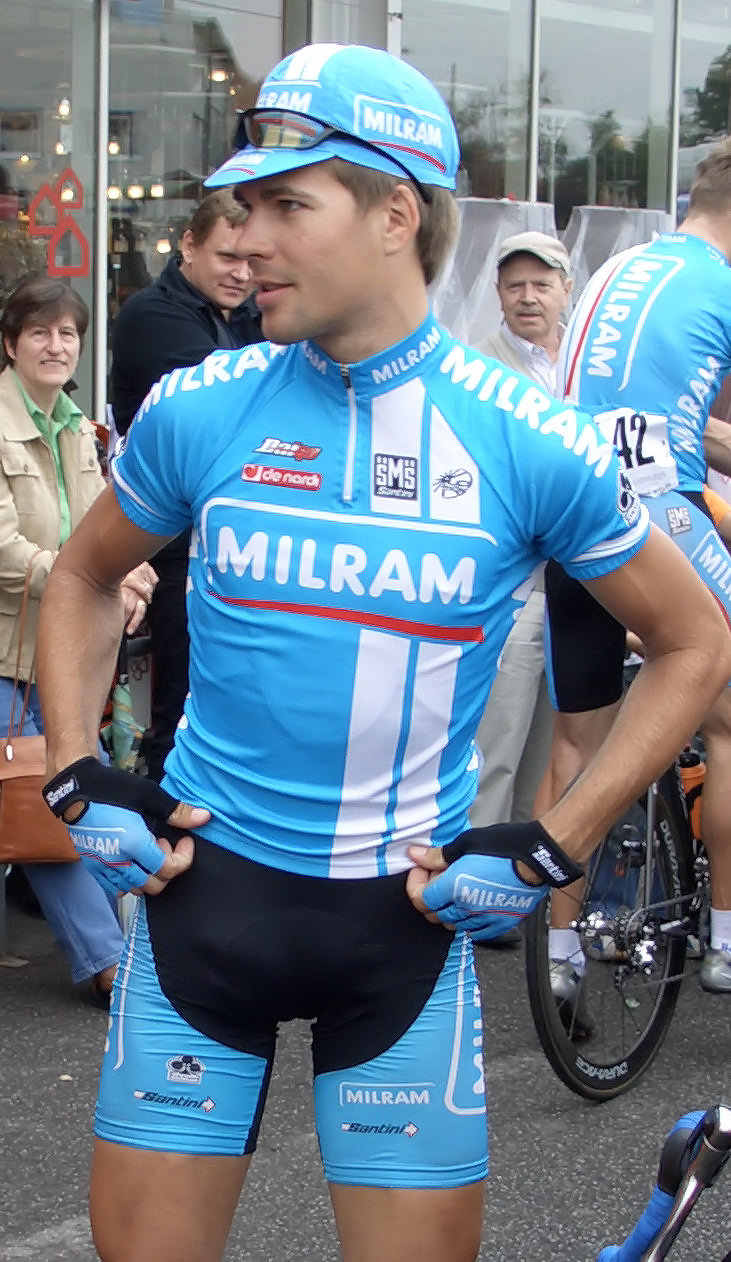
- Musiol in 2006

Personal information
- Full name: Daniel Musiol
- Born: March 27, 1983 (age 43) Cottbus, East Germany

Cycling career
- Sport: Cycling
- Current team: Retired
- Discipline: Road
- Role: Rider

Amateur teams
- 2004: Berliner TSC
- 2004: KED–Bianchi Rad-Team Berlin
- 2010: RSV Irschenberg

Professional teams
- 2005: Team Wiesenhof
- 2006: Team Milram
- 2007: Wiesenhof–Felt
- 2008–2009: Team Volksbank

Daniel Musiol (born 27 March 1983 in Cottbus) is a German former professional cyclist.

== Major results ==
2001
1st Team pursuit, National Junior Track Championships
2003
1st Stage 8 Tour de Guadeloupe
2007
5th Omloop van de Vlaamse Scheldeboorden
6th Rund um die Nürnberger Altstadt
9th Scheldeprijs
2008
7th Sparkassen Münsterland Giro
9th Scheldeprijs
