= Andreas Schillinger =

German cyclist

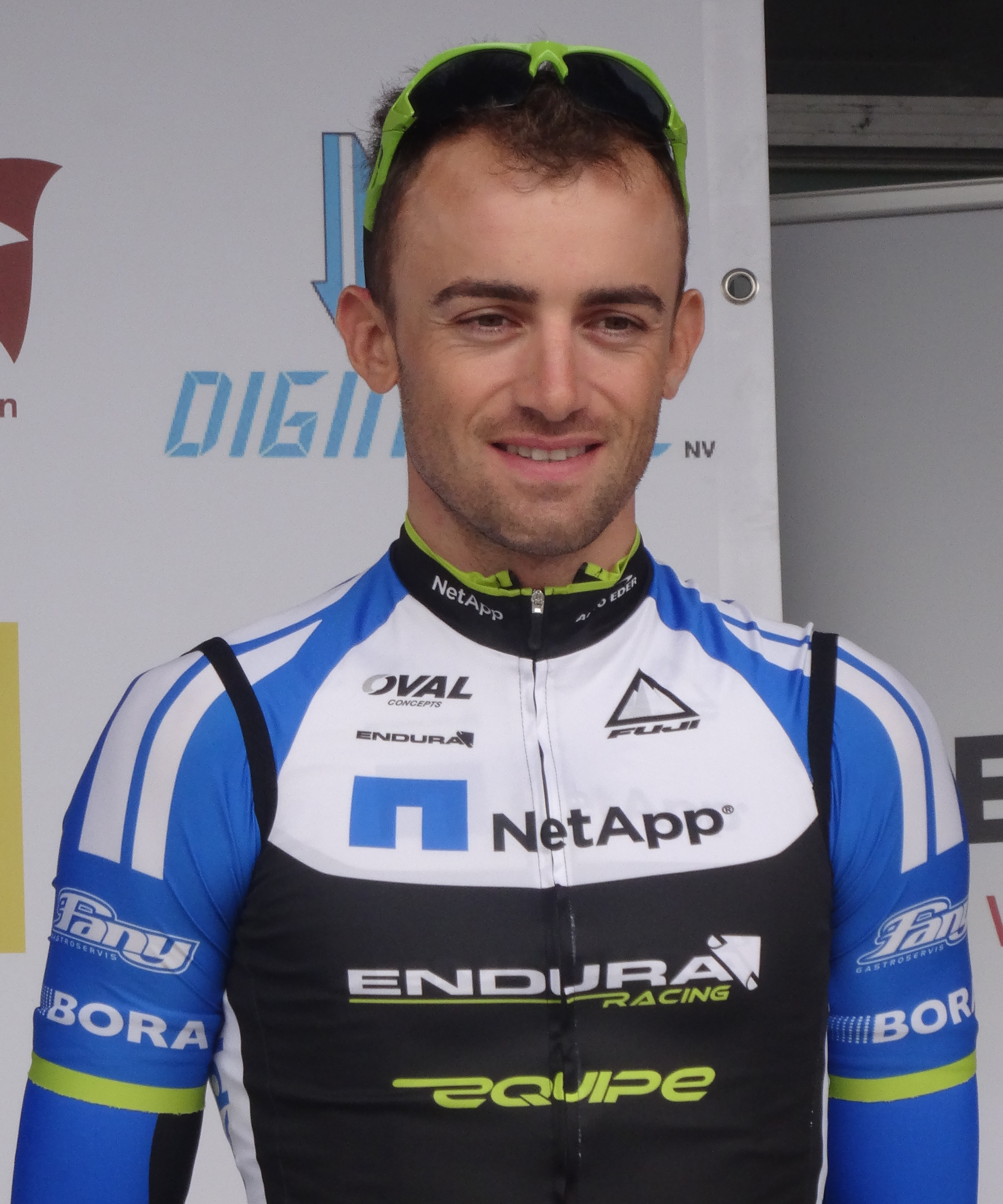
- Schillinger in 2014.

Personal information
- Full name: Andreas Schillinger
- Born: 13 July 1983 (age 43) Kümmersbruck, West Germany
- Height: 1.88 m (6 ft 2 in)
- Weight: 70 kg (154 lb)

Cycling career
- Sport: Cycling
- Current team: Retired
- Discipline: Road
- Role: Rider
- Rider type: All-rounder

Amateur teams
- 2004–2005: SSV Gera 1990
- 2004–2005: RG TEAG Team Köstritzer
- 2005: Team Wiesenhof (stagiaire)

Professional teams
- 2006: Continental Team Milram
- 2007–2009: Team Sparkasse
- 2010–2021: Team NetApp

Andreas Schillinger (born 13 July 1983 in Kümmersbruck) is a German former cyclist, who rode professionally between 2006 and 2021 for Continental Team Milram, Team Nutrixxion–Sparkasse and Bora–Hansgrohe.

== Major results ==
2003
3rd Time trial, National Under-23 Road Championships
2004
8th Overall Mainfranken-Tour
2005
2nd Rund um den Sachsenring
2006
1st Tour du Jura
2nd Rund um den Sachsenring
4th Druivenkoers Overijse
2008
4th Prague–Karlovy Vary–Prague
7th Overall Tour de Beauce

1st Stage 5

2009
1st Beverbeek Classic
2nd Overall Five Rings of Moscow

1st Stage 5

2010
1st Prague–Karlovy Vary–Prague
3rd Road race, National Road Championships
8th Trofeo Magaluf-Palmanova
2012
1st Rund um die Nürnberger Altstadt
2013
3rd Ronde van Drenthe
2015
3rd Rund um Köln
2016
9th Rudi Altig Race
2018
2nd Overall Czech Cycling Tour

1st Stage 1 (TTT)

2019
3rd Road race, National Road Championships
5th Rund um Köln

=== Grand Tour general classification results timeline ===
	2012	2013	2014	2015	2016	2017	2018	2019	2020
Giro d'Italia	154	—	—	—	—	—	139	—	—
Tour de France	—	—	144	DNF	154	—	—	—	—
Vuelta a España	—	—	—	—	—	144	—	—	123

Legend
—	Did not compete
DNF	Did not finish
