= Enrico Poitschke =

German cyclist

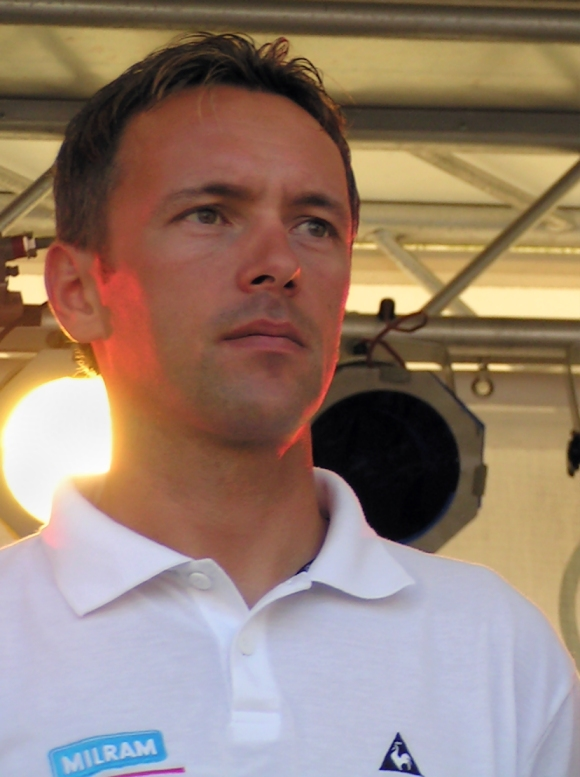

Personal information
- Full name: Enrico Poitschke
- Born: 23 August 1969 (age 57) Görlitz, East Germany

Cycling career
- Sport: Cycling
- Current team: Retired
- Discipline: Road
- Role: Rider

Professional teams
- 2000–2000: IPM
- 2001–2005: Wiesenhof–Leipzig
- 2006–2008: Team Milram

Enrico Poitschke (born 23 August 1969 in Görlitz) is a German former road racing cyclist.

== Major results ==
2001
1st, Stage 3, Ringerike GP
1st, Stage 5, Ringerike GP
1st, General Classification, Ringerike GP
1st, Stage 4, Course de la Paix
1st, Criterium München
1st, Criterium Hof
2003
1st, Rund um Hainleite-Erfurt
