= Alexander Gottfried =

German cyclist

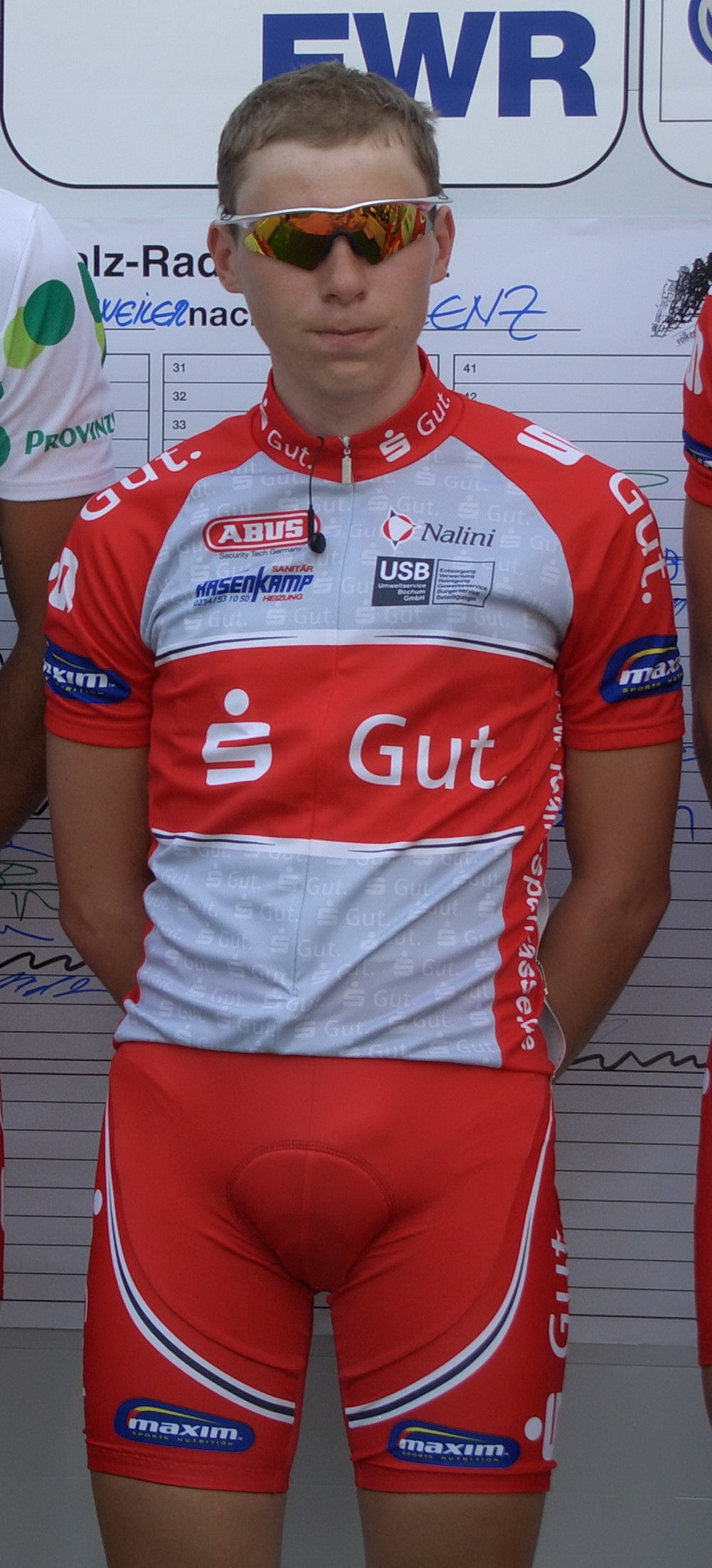

Personal information
- Full name: Alexander Gottfried
- Born: 5 July 1985 (age 41) Nettetal, West Germany

Cycling career
- Sport: Cycling
- Current team: Retired
- Discipline: Road
- Role: Rider

Amateur teams
- 2004: Die Hofbräu Radler Stuttgart
- 2004: OSG Dortmund
- 2014: RC Buer / Westerholt
- 2015: Team Starbikewear
- 2016: Cycle your Life

Professional teams
- 2005–2007: Team Sparkasse
- 2007–2008: Tinkoff Credit Systems
- 2009: Kuota–Indeland
- 2010–2011: Team NetApp
- 2012–2013: Nutrixxion–Abus

Alexander Gottfried (born 5 July 1985 in Nettetal) is a German former professional cyclist.

== Major results ==
2005
1st Stage 7 Tour de l'Avenir
2nd Road race, National Under-23 Road Championships
2007
1st Stage 1 Giro delle Regioni
