= Pascal Hungerbühler =

Swiss cyclist (born 1977)

Personal information
- Born: 22 February 1977 (age 49) Zürich, Switzerland

Cycling career
- Sport: Cycling
- Current team: Retired
- Discipline: Road
- Role: Rider

Professional teams
- 2000–2001: KIA–Villiger Suisse
- 2002: Team LTA–Quatrro Logistics
- 2003–2009: Volksbank–Ideal

Pascal Hungerbühler (born 22 February 1977) is a Swiss former professional road cyclist.

== Major results ==
2003
8th Tour du Jura
10th Overall UNIQA Classic
2004
1st Rund um den Flughafen Köln-Bonn
6th Overall Bayern–Rundfahrt
2005
10th Overall Tour of Austria
2006
8th GP du canton d'Argovie
10h Overall Bayern–Rundfahrt
2007
3rd Overall Tour of Hainan
5th Road race, National Road Championships
10th GP du canton d'Argovie
