= 2006 Grote Prijs Jef Scherens =

Race details
- Dates: 3 September 2006
- Stages: 1
- Distance: 183 km (113.7 mi)
- Winning time: 4h 25' 15"

Results
	Winner	Marcel Sieberg (GER)
	Second	Dirk Müller (GER)
	Third	Sergey Lagutin (UZB)

The 2006 Grote Prijs Jef Scherens was the 40th edition of the Grote Prijs Jef Scherens cycle race and was held on 3 September 2006. The race started and finished in Leuven. The race was won by Marcel Sieberg.

== General classification ==
Final general classification

Rank	Rider	Time
1	Marcel Sieberg (GER)	4h 25' 15"
2	Dirk Müller (GER)	+ 14"
3	Sergey Lagutin (UZB)	+ 14"
4	Frédéric Amorison (BEL)	+ 14"
5	Danilo Hondo (GER)	+ 40"
6	Johan Coenen (BEL)	+ 46"
7	Robert Retschke (GER)	+ 46"
8	Nico Sijmens (BEL)	+ 46"
9	Bert Scheirlinckx (BEL)	+ 46"
10	William Bonnet (FRA)	+ 46"
