= Hussain Ajij Kurbu =

Indian cyclist (born 1990)

Hussen Ajij Kurbu also known as Hussain Ajij Kurbu (born 1990) is an Indian national cyclist champion and the captain of Maharashtra cycling team. He won three gold medals in a row winning National road cycling championships organised by Cycling Federation of India, since the year 2010.

== Personal life ==
Kurbu was born in a poor family and didn't afford to buy a racing cycle worth ₹ 25,000/-. He made his cycle own purchasing parts by parts in total two years(2001-2003) and used the same cycle to practice and win races. His father was working to a Bakery shop and his mother used to work in neighbors home. He is brother of one elder and two younger sisters.

== Career ==
Kurbu appeared in the Cycle Federation of India's competition for the first time at the age of 13 in 2003 and won a bronze medal. He won the same next year too, in 2004. He used his prize money getting his sisters married. He is now the captain of the Maharashtra Cycling team. Despite being a national champion, he still works at his cycle's shop. He secured first place in the Full Cyclothon category of Godrej Eon Tour de India-2013, the world's biggest cycling event organised by Cycle Federation of India in Mumbai. He secured first place in Prime Sprint (Panvel), Khopoli Prime & Kamshet Prime categories of the 52nd edition of India's oldest ever cycle race, the National Mumbai-Pune cycling held on 13 January 2013.

== See also ==
- Cycling Federation of India
- Tour De India
- Asian Cycling Championships
