= Gerald Ciolek =

German road bicycle racer

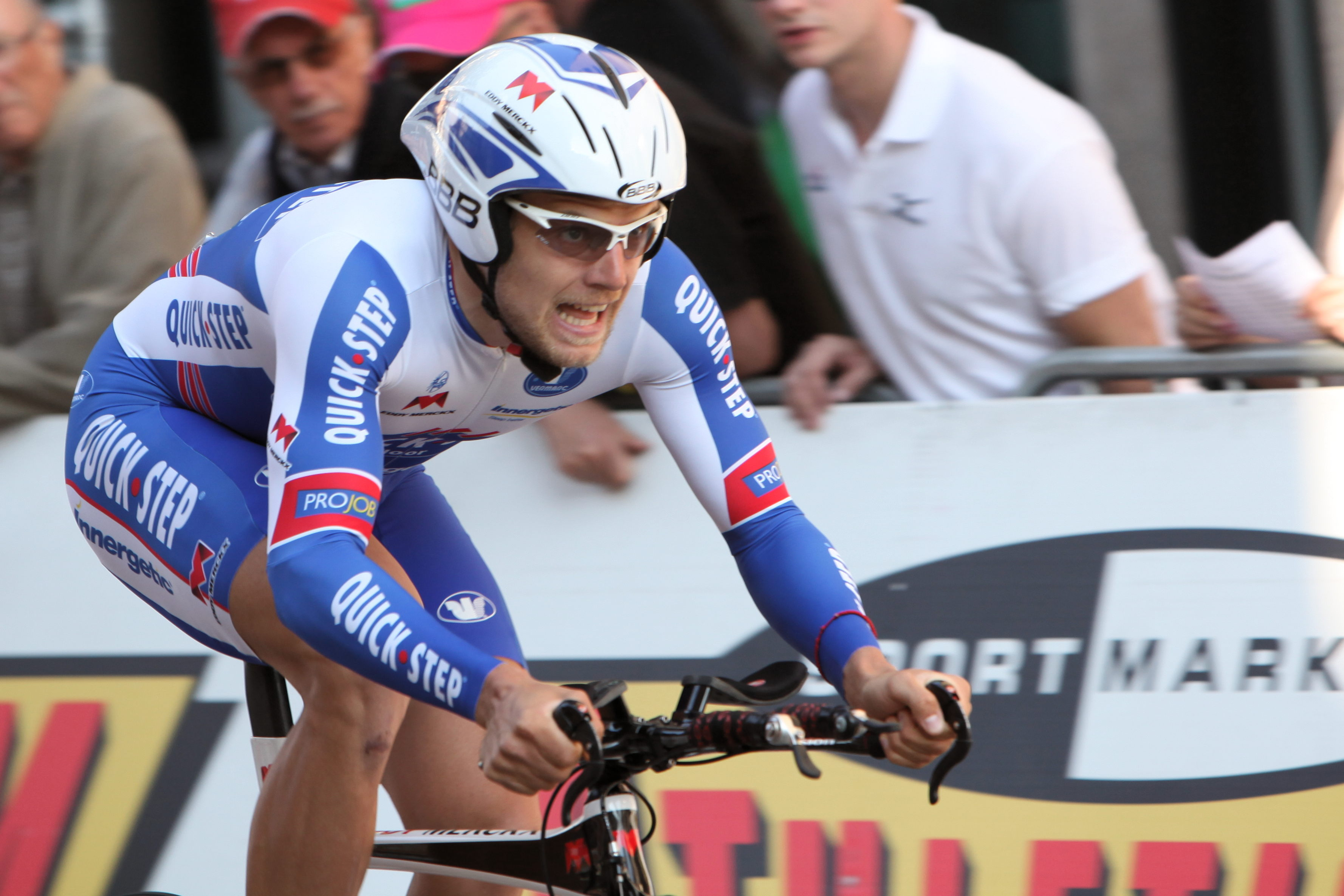
- Ciolek at the 2011 Tour de Romandie

Personal information
- Full name: Gerald Michael Ciolek
- Nickname: Gerry
- Born: 19 September 1986 (age 40) Cologne, West Germany
- Height: 1.79 m (5 ft 10 in)
- Weight: 75 kg (165 lb)

Cycling career
- Sport: Cycling
- Current team: Dauner–Akkon
- Discipline: Road
- Role: Rider (retired); Directeur sportif
- Rider type: Sprinter

Amateur team
- 2003–2004: Pulheimer SC

Professional teams
- 2005–2006: Team Wiesenhof
- 2007–2008: T-Mobile Team
- 2009–2010: Team Milram
- 2011–2012: Quick-Step
- 2013–2015: MTN–Qhubeka
- 2016: Stölting Service Group

Managerial team
- 2019–: Dauner–Akkon

Major wins
- Grand Tours Vuelta a España 1 individual stage (2009) One-day races and Classics National Road Race Championships (2005) Milan–San Remo (2013)
Medal record
Representing Germany
Road bicycle racing
UCI Road World Championships
Gold medal – first place	2006 Salzburg	Men's under-23 road race

Gerald Michael Ciolek (born 19 September 1986) is a German former professional road bicycle racer, who rode professionally between 2005 and 2016. He currently works as a directeur sportif for UCI Continental team Dauner–Akkon.

== Career ==
Ciolek started racing at senior events in May 2005, with Team Wiesenhof, where he had a very successful season. He won the German National Road Race Championships aged 18, the youngest ever rider to do so. Ciolek was able to overcome seasoned sprinters Erik Zabel and Robert Förster without help from any teammates, ending the twelve-year domination of T-Mobile. Besides winning the national championship, he secured three stage victories and the points competition at the Tour de Hongrie, and a stage victory at the Mainfranken Tour.

In 2006, Ciolek completed his training at the Ford Motor Company and was able to turn professional and devote his career to cycling. Through the season, he rode strongly and secured a number of high placings in important races to prove he could challenge, and beat, the strongest sprinters in UCI ProTour teams. Ciolek had an excellent second placing at the Rund um den Henninger Turm, where he once again beat Erik Zabel. Since Ciolek's AKUD Arnolds Sicherheit team merged with Team Wiesenhof at the beginning of the season to be the strongest German team outside of the UCI ProTour, they were able to secure wild card entries to a number of ProTour events where Ciolek shone even more. At the Vattenfall Cyclassics, Ciolek secured fifth place. A few weeks later, Ciolek won his first UCI ProTour event at the Tour of Germany, where he won stage three. On 23 September he won U23 Road Race World Championship in Salzburg.

For the 2007 season, Ciolek left Wiesenhof for the UCI ProTour with T-Mobile Team. After a relatively quiet early season, he came from behind to win the Rheinland-Pfalz Rundfahrt in May. He then caught fire in August, when he took three stages of the Deutschland Tour and was a fast-charging third in the Vattenfall Cyclassics.

In the 2008 season, Ciolek raced for Team High Road. During 2008, he was a stage winner in Sparkassencup Schwenningen, and won two stages in the Bayern Rundfahrt. In the Tour de France, Ciolek was an instrumental figure in all four of Mark Cavendish's stage wins. On the final stage on the Champs-Élysées Ciolek managed to finish second to Gert Steegmans. He participated in the Olympic Games Road Race but had to abandon due to the effect the extreme conditions had on him. However, in September, he was able to bounce back and claim the fifth stage of the Deutschland Tour in an uphill sprint finish.

Ciolek parted ways with Omega Pharma–Quick-Step at the end of the 2012 season, and joined the MTN–Qhubeka squad for the 2013 season. In his first year with the team, Ciolek won Milan–San Remo, in a time of 5 hours, 37 minutes and 20 seconds, holding off favourites Peter Sagan (Cannondale) and Fabian Cancellara (RadioShack–Leopard) in the sprint finish.

== Major results ==
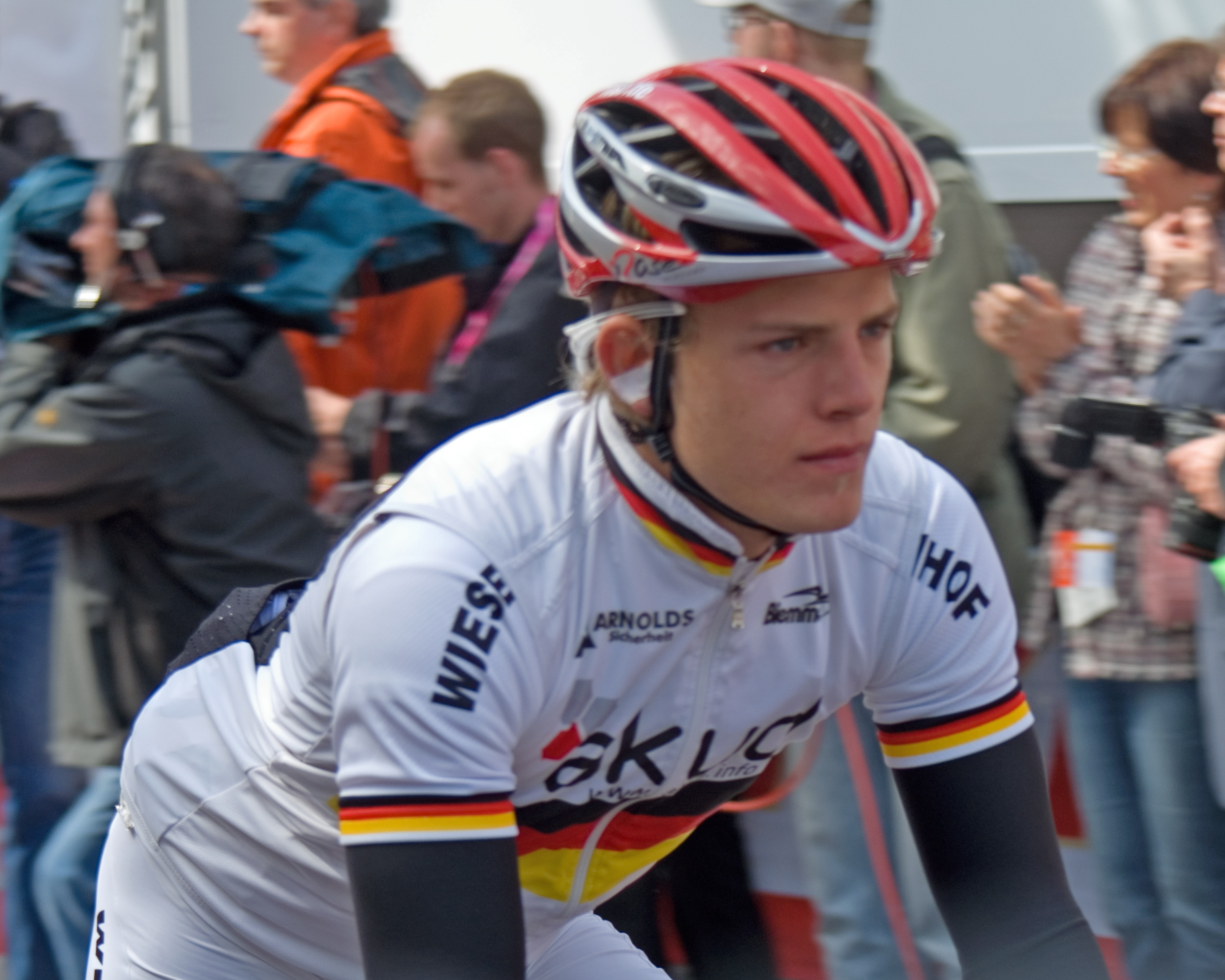
Ciolek as champion of Germany at the 2006 Rund um den Henninger Turm, where he finished second

2004
Trofeo Karlsberg

1st Stages 2 & 4

9th Overall Niedersachsen Rundfahrt Juniors

1st Stage 1

2005
1st Road race, National Road Championships
Tour de Hongrie

1st Points classification
1st Stages 3, 7 & 8

1st Stage 3 Mainfranken-Tour
8th Grand Prix de Waregem
2006
1st Road race, UCI Under-23 Road World Championships
1st Rund um die Nürnberger Altstadt
1st Stage 3 Deutschland Tour
2nd Rund um den Henninger Turm
5th Vattenfall Cyclassics
6th Overall Istrian Spring Trophy

1st Stage 3

8th Overall Niedersachsen Rundfahrt

1st Young rider classification

8th Neuseen Classics
2007
1st Overall Rheinland-Pfalz Rundfahrt

1st Sprints classification
1st Young rider classification

Deutschland Tour

1st Stages 6, 7 & 9

Tour of Austria

1st Points classification
1st Stages 2 & 8

1st Stage 1 3-Länder-Tour
2nd Münsterland Giro
3rd Overall Niedersachsen Rundfahrt

1st Stage 3

3rd Vattenfall Cyclassics
8th Overall Ster Elektrotoer
2008
1st Stage 5 Deutschland Tour
3rd Road race, National Road Championships
5th Overall Bayern Rundfahrt

1st Stages 1 & 3

2009
Vuelta a Mallorca

1st Trofeo Calvià
5th Trofeo Pollença

1st Stage 2 Vuelta a España
2nd Sparkassen Giro Bochum
3rd Vattenfall Cyclassics
9th Neuseen Classics
2010
1st Stage 3 Bayern Rundfahrt
5th Overall Four Days of Dunkirk
5th Binche–Tournai–Binche
6th Overall Circuit Franco-Belge
2011
2nd Road race, National Road Championships
2nd Vattenfall Cyclassics
9th Grand Prix Cycliste de Québec
2012
1st Stage 4 Volta ao Algarve
1st Stage 2b (TTT) Tour de l'Ain
9th Grand Prix Cycliste de Québec
10th Trofeo Deià
2013
1st Milan–San Remo
1st Stage 2 Driedaagse van West-Vlaanderen
1st Stage 2 Tour of Britain
1st Stage 6 Tour of Austria
2nd Road race, National Road Championships
5th Trofeo Laigueglia
5th Eschborn–Frankfurt City Loop
6th Brussels Cycling Classic
10th Overall Bayern Rundfahrt

1st Stage 3

10th Schaal Sels
2014
1st Stage 3 Vuelta a Andalucía
3rd Rund um Köln
5th Overall Tour of Norway
8th Le Samyn
9th Milan–San Remo
2015
6th Velothon Berlin
2016
5th Road race, National Road Championships
6th Rund um Köln

=== Grand Tour general classification results timeline ===
Grand Tour	2008	2009	2010	2011	2012	2013	2014
Giro d'Italia	—	—	—	DNF	—	—	—
Tour de France	106	126	133	150	—	—	—
Vuelta a España	—	DNF	—	—	—	—	139

Legend
—	Did not compete
DNF	Did not finish
