= Dirk Müller (cyclist) =

German cyclist

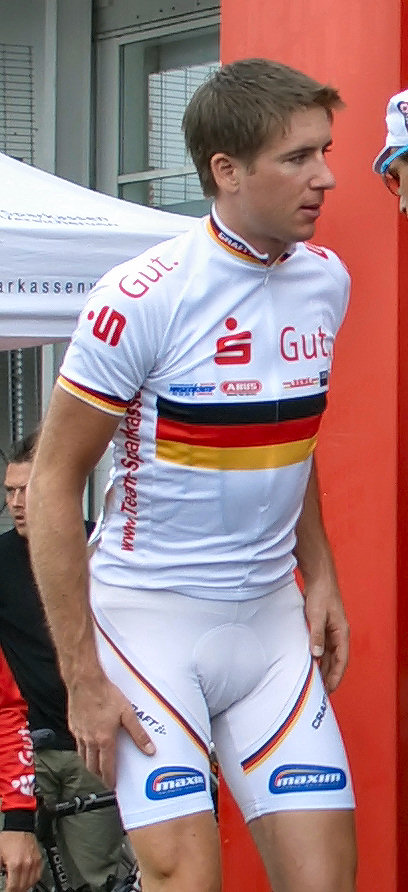

Personal information
- Born: 4 August 1973 (age 53) Bad Hersfeld, West Germany

Cycling career
- Sport: Cycling
- Current team: Retired
- Discipline: Road
- Role: Rider

Professional teams
- 1997: EC Bayer–Worringen
- 1998: Team Telekom
- 1999: Mapei–Quick-Step
- 2000: Post Swiss Team
- 2002: Team Cologne
- 2006–2013: Team Sparkasse

Dirk Müller (born 4 August 1973) is a German former cyclist. He won the German National Road Race Championships in 2006.

== Major results ==
1993
1st Stage 2 Bayern-Rundfahrt
1994
3rd Overall Cinturón a Mallorca
1995
1st Overall Sachsen Tour
5th Overall Regio-Tour
1996
1st Rund um den Sachsenring
1st Stage 5 Giro delle Regioni
1st Prologue Niedersachsen-Rundfahrt
3rd Overall Sachsen Tour
1997
1st Prologue Bayern Rundfahrt
1st Rund um die Hainleite
1998
1st Prologue & Stage 2 Bayern Rundfahrt
1st Stage 7 Sachsen Tour
3rd Overall Tour de Luxembourg
1999
2nd Sparkassen Giro Bochum
3rd National Time Trial Championships
2000
2nd Hel van het Mergelland
7th Overall Regio-Tour
2006
1st National Road Race Championships
1st Rund um die Sparkasse
2nd Grote Prijs Jef Scherens
9th Overall Sachsen-Tour
2007
1st Köln-Schuld-Frechen
1st Berlin-Bad Freienwald-Berlin
2008
1st Overall Cinturón a Mallorca

1st stage 5

1st Overall Grand Prix of Sochi

1st Stages 1 & 3

1st Stage 5 Troféu Joaquim Agostinho
2nd Prague–Karlovy Vary–Prague
3rd Overall Circuit des Ardennes
4th Beverbeek Classic
8th GP Triberg-Schwarzwald
2009
1st Rund um den Sachsenring
2nd Overall Cinturón a Mallorca
2nd Tour de Seoul
3rd Overall Five Rings of Moscow
3rd Overall Sachsen-Tour
4th Sparkassen Münsterland Giro
5th Overall Flèche du Sud
2010
1st Overall Tour of China

1st Prologue & Stage 5

1st Pomerania Tour
2nd Münsterland Giro
2nd Mumbai Cyclothon
3rd Szlakiem Grodów Piastowskich
7th Overall Tour de Seoul
10th Overall Czech Cycling Tour
2011
8th Overall Tour of China
2012
3rd Overall Tour de Taiwan
3rd Overall Five Rings of Moscow
5th Grand Prix of Moscow
6th Overall Tour of Fuzhou
8th Overall Tour of China II
