= Tour de India =

Indian bicycle race

Race details
- Date: December 15
- Region: Mumbai, Delh, Jaipur, Shrinagar
- Local name(s): Cyclothon (in Hindi)
- Nickname(s): Cyclothon India
- Discipline: Road
- Competition: Professional
- Type: Stage race (Grand Tour)
- Organiser: ID Sports
- Web site: www.tourdeindia.asia

History
- First edition: 2012
- Editions: 2 (2013)

Tour de India was a three city cycling event that was held in India. The first edition took place in 2012 in Mumbai, Srinagar & Delhi, and in 2013 the races were held in Mumbai, Jaipur and Delhi. Having received an affiliation from the Union Cycliste Internationale (UCI), the cycling event had cyclists participating from India and abroad. The event was brought to India by Dr. Akil Khan, and was sponsored by Godrej Eon from the first edition.

Vaibhav Vinay Maloo was the managing director of Tour de India in 2013. During his term, he tied up with University of Cambridge students to come and do a study on their operational model, and came up with ways to promote cycling as a sport in India.

== 2013 winners ==
=== Mumbai ===
- Full Cyclothon - Husen Ajij Korabu
- Champions of Cyclothon (Seniors) - Sudhakar Balakrishna Rane

Half Cyclothon

- Road Men - Adil Niazi
- Hybrid Men - Kiran Shedge
- Hybrid Women - Meena Barot

=== Delhi ===
- Champions of Cyclothon (Children) - Nidhi Sharma

Half Cyclothon

- Road Men - Navneet
- Hybrid Men - Tanveer Alam
- Hybrid Women - Deepakshi Vasudeva

=== Jaipur ===
- Green Cyclothon
- Champions of Cyclothon
- International
