= Johannes Fröhlinger =

German road bicycle racer

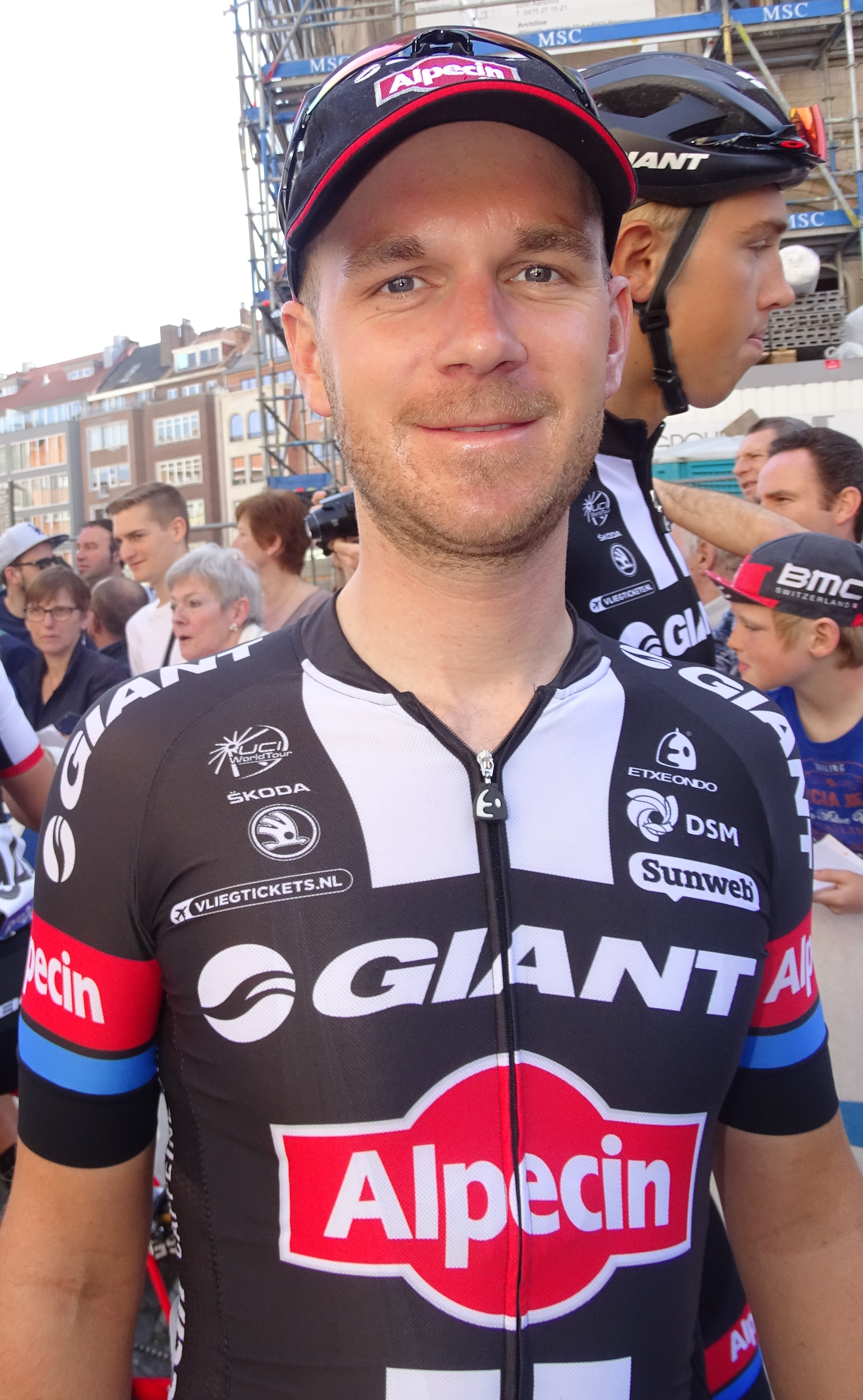
- Fröhlinger at the 2015 Brabantse Pijl.

Personal information
- Full name: Johannes Fröhlinger
- Born: 9 June 1985 (age 41) Gerolstein, West Germany
- Height: 1.73 m (5 ft 8 in)
- Weight: 63 kg (139 lb)

Cycling career
- Sport: Cycling
- Current team: Retired
- Discipline: Road
- Role: Rider
- Rider type: All-rounder

Amateur team
- 2006: Gerolsteiner (stagiaire)

Professional teams
- 2007–2008: Gerolsteiner
- 2009–2010: Team Milram
- 2011–2019: Skil–Shimano

Johannes Fröhlinger (born 9 June 1985 in Gerolstein, Rhineland-Palatinate) is a German former professional road bicycle racer, who competed professionally between 2007 and 2019 for the Gerolsteiner, Team Milram and Team Sunweb squads.

== Major results ==
2006
1st Overall Tour Alsace
1st Trophée des Champions
6th Overall Mainfranken-Tour
6th Overall 3-Länder-Tour
2008
9th GP Triberg-Schwarzwald
2009
3rd GP Triberg-Schwarzwald
5th Memorial Cimurri
2010
7th Japan Cup
10th Trofeo Inca
2011
6th Overall Bayern–Rundfahrt

=== Grand Tour general classification results timeline ===
Grand Tour	2007	2008	2009	2010	2011	2012	2013	2014	2015	2016	2017	2018
Giro d'Italia	—	51	—	—	—	—	—	—	—	—	—	—
Tour de France	—	—	78	90	—	DNF	146	—	—	—	—	—
Vuelta a España	45	—	—	37	49	83	59	97	143	87	120	115

Legend
—	Did not compete
DNF	Did not finish
