= Björn Schröder =

German professional road bicycle racer (born 1980)

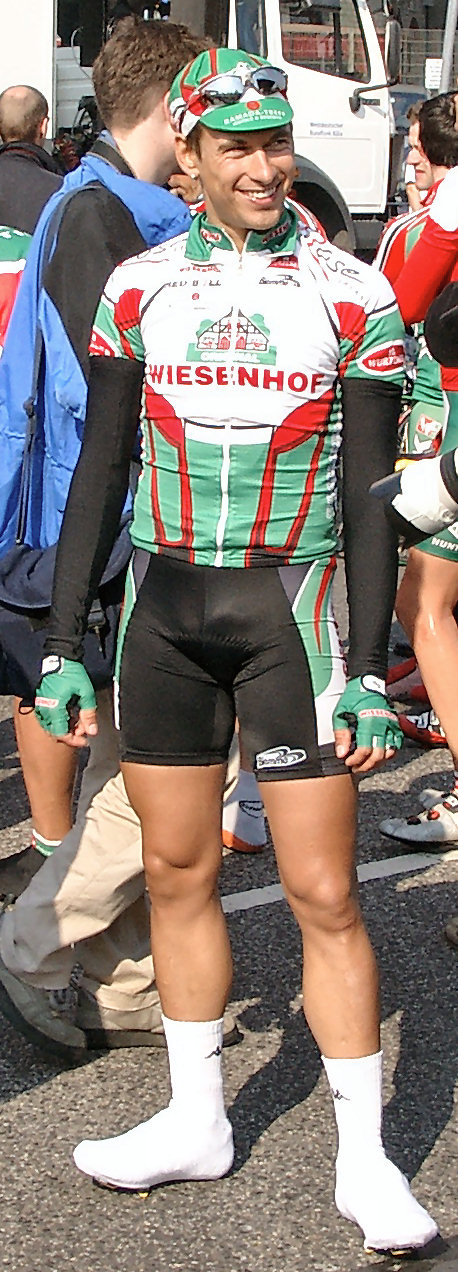

Personal information
- Full name: Björn Schröder
- Born: 27 October 1980 (age 45) Berlin, Germany

Cycling career
- Sport: Cycling
- Current team: Team Stölting
- Discipline: Road
- Role: Rider

Amateur teams
- 2000: Bianchi Berlin 88
- 2001: Team Berlin

Professional teams
- 2003–2005: Wiesenhof
- 2006–2010: Team Milram
- 2011: Team Nutrixxion
- 2012–: Raiko-Stölting

Björn Schröder (born 27 October 1980 in Berlin) is a German professional road bicycle racer, who currently competes for Team Stölting.

== Career achievements ==
=== Major results ===
Cyclo-cross

1995–1996
2nd National Under-17 Championships
1996–1997
3rd National Under-19 Championships
1999–2000
3rd National Under-23 Championships
2000–2001
2nd National Under-23 Championships
2001–2002
2nd National Under-23 Championships

Road

2002
2nd National Hill Climb Championships
2003
Circuit des Mines

1st Stages 5 & 7

2004
1st Stage 5 Sachsen Tour
2005
1st Stage 3 Sachsen Tour
2006
1st Stage 5 Bayern-Rundfahrt
2007
7th Overall 3-Länder-Tour
2008
1st Overall Rothaus Regio-Tour
1st GP Buchholz
9th Neuseen Classics
2009
7th Scheldeprijs
2011
1st Overall Grand Prix of Sochi
6th Overall Five Rings of Moscow
2012
9th ProRace Berlin
