= Artur Gajek =

German cyclist

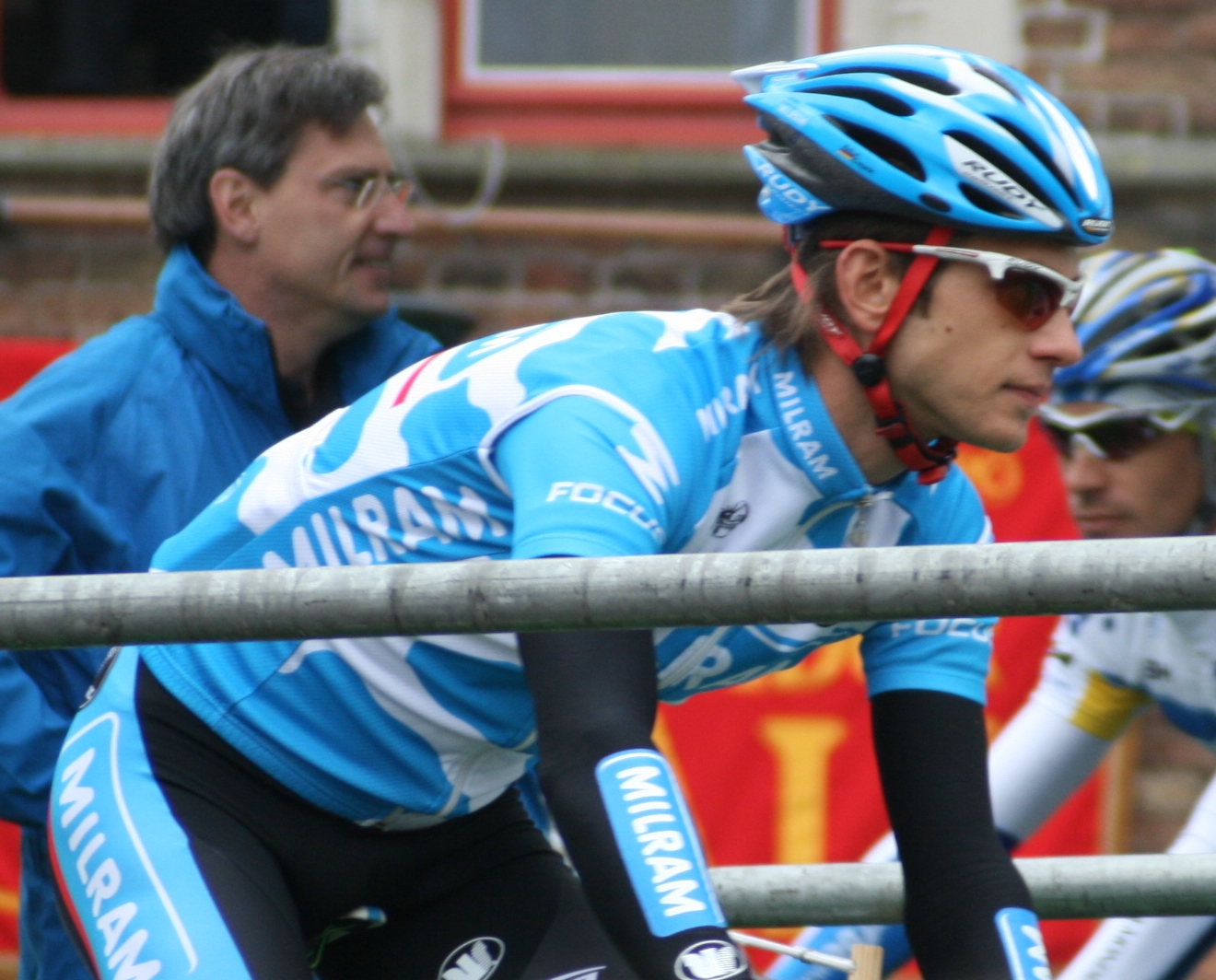

Personal information
- Full name: Artur Gajek
- Born: 18 April 1985 (age 41) Bergisch Gladbach, West-Germany

Cycling career
- Sport: Cycling
- Current team: Retired
- Discipline: Road
- Role: Rider

Amateur teams
- 2004: Winfix Arnolds
- 2005: AKUD-Arnolds

Professional teams
- 2006–2007: Wiesenhof–AKUD
- 2008–2010: Team Milram

Artur Gajek (born 18 April 1985 in Bergisch Gladbach, North Rhine-Westphalia) is a former German road bicycle racer who last rode for Team Milram.

== Major results ==
2006
1st Rund um den Sachsenring
1st Omloop van het Houtland
1st Stage 1, Vuelta a Tenerife
