= Wim De Vocht =

Belgian cyclist

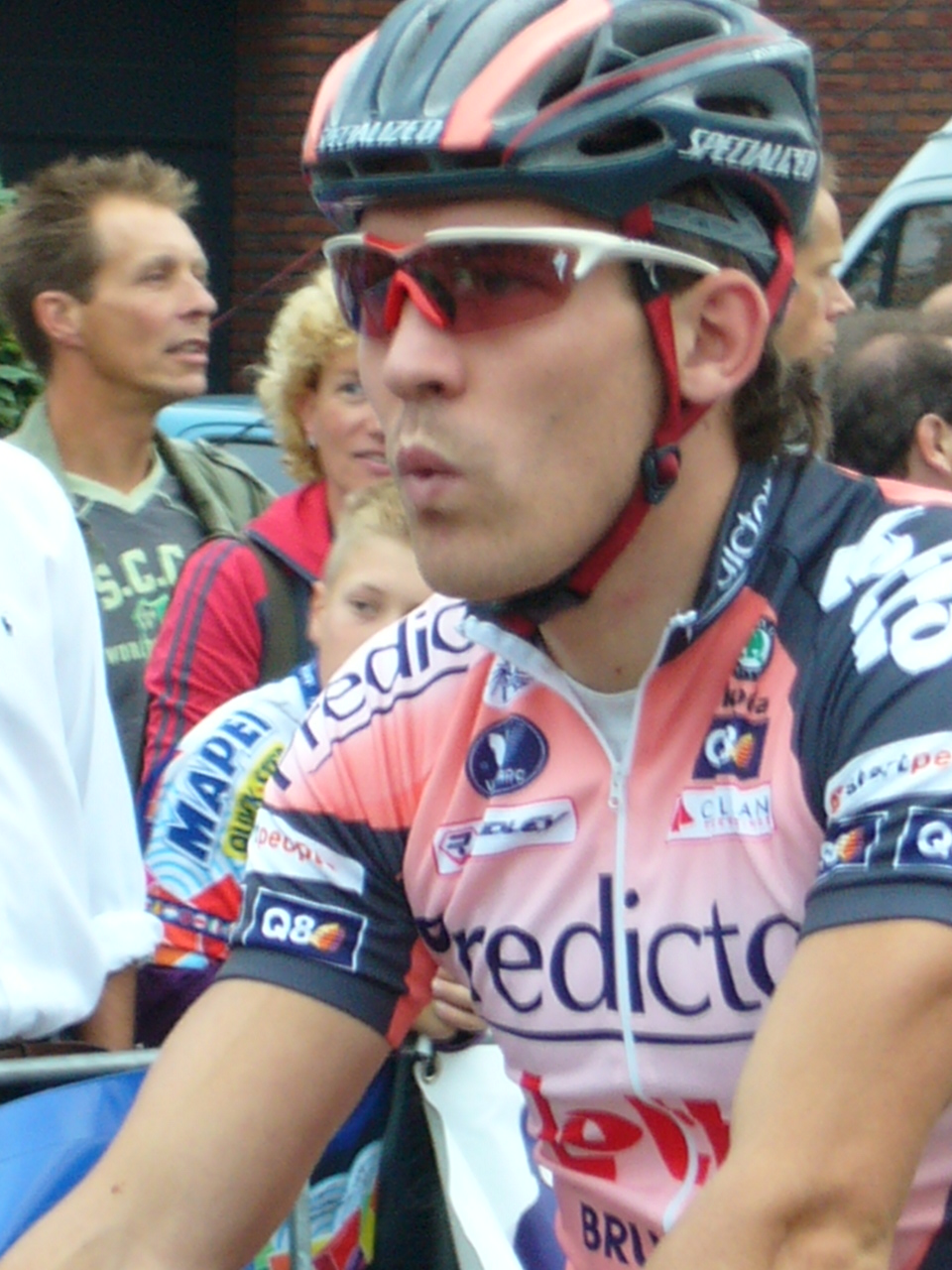
- De Vocht at the 2007 Mijl van Mares.

Personal information
- Full name: Wim De Vocht
- Born: 29 April 1982 (age 44) Belgium
- Height: 1.88 m (6 ft 2 in)
- Weight: 78 kg (172 lb)

Cycling career
- Sport: Cycling
- Current team: Retired
- Discipline: Road
- Role: Rider

Amateur team
- 2003: Quick Step-Davitamon-Latexco

Professional teams
- 2004: Relax
- 2005–2008: Davitamon–Lotto
- 2009: Vacansoleil
- 2010: Team Milram
- 2011–: Veranda's Willems–Accent

Wim De Vocht (born 29 April 1982) is a Belgian retired professional road bicycle racer, who competed as a professional between 2004 and 2012.

His sister Liesbet De Vocht is also a former professional cyclist.

== Palmarès ==
1998
3rd National Under-17 Time Trial Championships
2000
1st National Under-19 Road Race Championships
2nd National Under-19 Time Trial Championships
2002

2003
1st Ronde Van Vlaanderen Beloften
3rd GP Istria 3
6th Zesbergenprijs Harelbeke
6th Duo Normand
7th Zellik–Galmaarden
2005
2nd Memorial Rik Van Steenbergen
2006
9th Omloop Het Volk
2010
8th Ronde van het Groene Hart
