= 2006 Bayern Rundfahrt =

Race details
- Dates: 24–28 May 2006
- Stages: 5
- Distance: 777.2 km (482.9 mi)
- Winning time: 18h 52' 29"

Results
	Winner	José Alberto Martínez (ESP)
	Second	Beat Zberg (SUI)
	Third	Luke Roberts (AUS)

The 2006 Bayern Rundfahrt was the 27th edition of the Bayern Rundfahrt cycle race and was held on 24 May to 28 May 2006. The race started in Gunzenhausen and finished in Cham. The race was won by José Alberto Martínez.

== General classification ==
Final general classification

Rank	Rider	Time
1	José Alberto Martínez (ESP)	18h 52' 29"
2	Beat Zberg (SUI)	+ 9"
3	Luke Roberts (AUS)	+ 19"
4	Lars Bak (DEN)	+ 28"
5	Eddy Ratti (ITA)	+ 31"
6	Brian Vandborg (DEN)	+ 43"
7	Peter Wrolich (AUT)	+ 56"
8	Marcel Strauss (SUI)	+ 1' 05"
9	Patrik Sinkewitz (GER)	+ 1' 07"
10	Pascal Hungerbühler (AUT)	+ 1' 18"
