= Eric Baumann (cyclist) =

German road cyclist (born 1980)

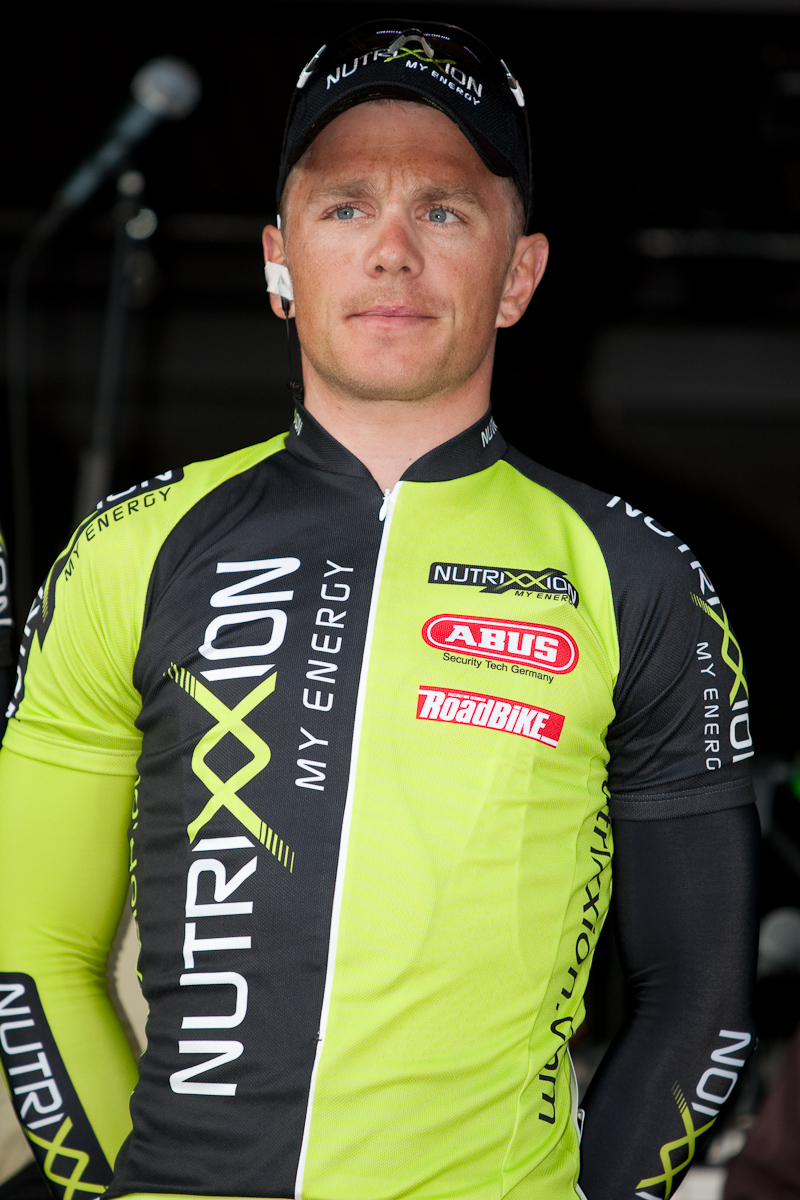

Personal information
- Full name: Eric Baumann
- Born: 21 March 1980 (age 46) Rostock, East Germany
- Height: 1.77 m (5 ft 10 in)
- Weight: 72 kg (159 lb; 11.3 st)

Cycling career
- Sport: Cycling
- Discipline: Road
- Role: Rider
- Rider type: Classics specialist

Professional teams
- 2003: Team Wiesenhof
- 2004–2007: T-Mobile
- 2008–2009: Team Sparkasse
- 2010–2011: Team NetApp

Major wins
- Tour de Luxembourg, 1 stage

Eric Baumann (born 21 March 1980 in Rostock) is a German professional road bicycle racer for Team NetApp in 2010 and used to ride for the UCI Continental team Team Sparkasse. He secured a contract with T-Mobile Team in 2004, having turned professional with Team Wiesenhof in 2003 and before that riding as amateur for Team Köstritzer.

He lives in Leipzig.

== Palmares ==
2000
Paris–Roubaix (U23)
2001
European Championships (U23)
2002
German Champion (U23)
2003
Tour of Solidarnosc stage 2
2005
Tour de Luxembourg stage 1
2008
Sparkassen Giro Bochum
