= Team NSP–Ghost =

Team information
- UCI code: NSP
- Registered: Germany
- Founded: 2011
- Disbanded: 2013
- Discipline: Road
- Status: UCI Continental
- Bicycles: Ghost Bikes

Key personnel
- General manager: Thomas Kohlhepp
- Team managers: Lars Wackernagel; Frank Neff

Team name history
- 2011 2012–2013: Team NSP; Team NSP–Ghost

Team NSP–Ghost was a German UCI Continental cycling team.

== Major wins ==
2009
Tour du Loir-et-Cher, Tino Thömel
Ronde van Midden-Nederland, Sebastian Forke
