= André Schulze =

German cyclist (born 1974)

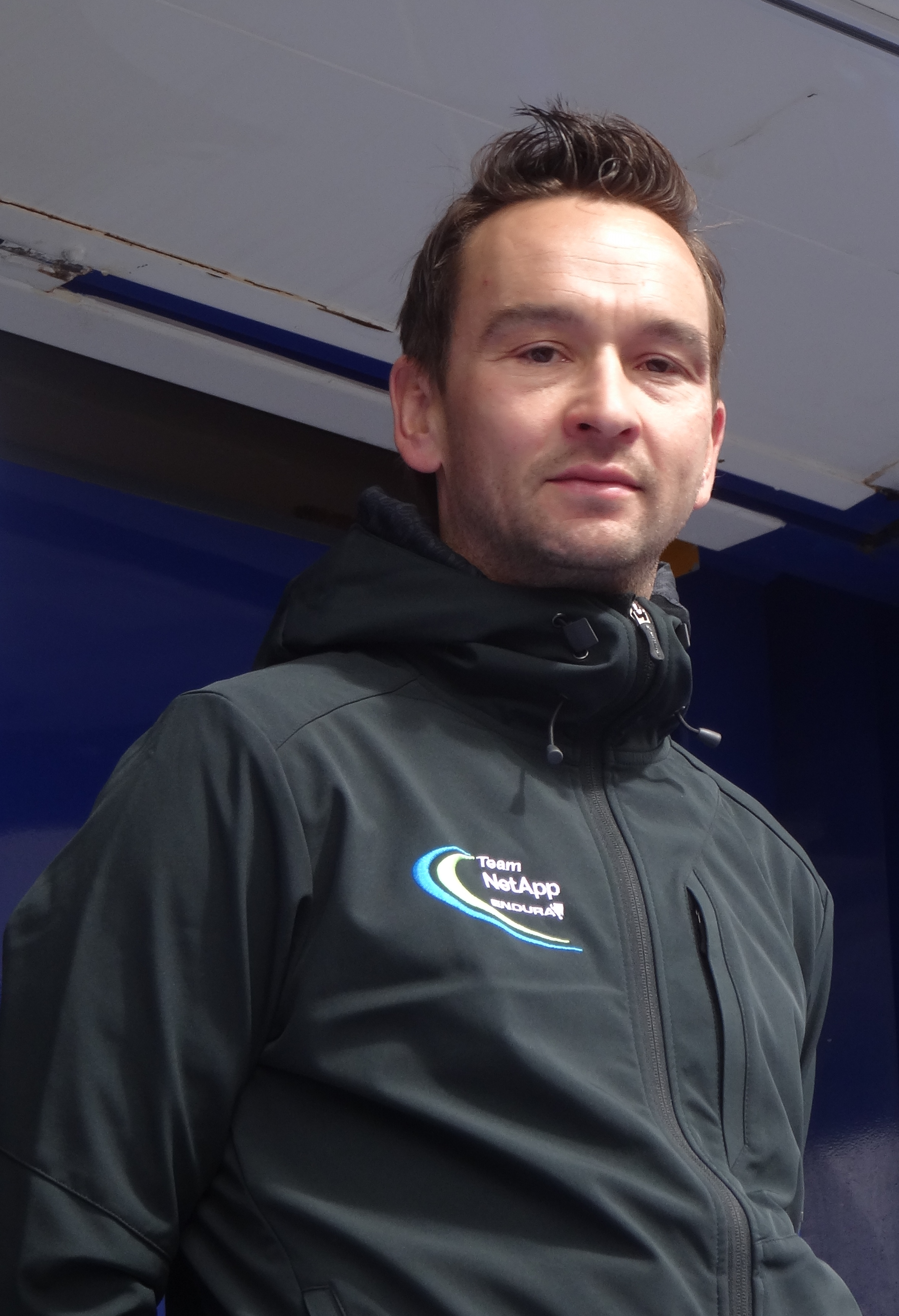
- Schulze at the 2014 Quatre jours de Dunkerque.

Personal information
- Full name: André Schulze
- Born: 21 November 1974 (age 51) Görlitz, East Germany

Cycling career
- Sport: Cycling
- Current team: Red Bull–Bora–Hansgrohe
- Discipline: Road
- Role: Rider (retired); Directeur sportif

Amateur teams
- 1999: Bunte Berte
- 2000: Sportklub DHfk Leipzig

Professional teams
- 2001–2002: Wiesenhof–Leipzig
- 2003: Vermarc Sportswear
- 2004: VC Frankfurt Radteam – Brügelmann
- 2005: Sparkasse
- 2006: Team Lamonta
- 2007: Wiesenhof–Felt
- 2008–2010: PSK Whirlpool–Author
- 2011: CCC–Polsat–Polkowice
- 2012: Team NetApp
- 2013: Euskaltel–Euskadi

Managerial team
- 2014–: NetApp–Endura

André Schulze (born 21 November 1974) is a German former road racing cyclist, who competed as a professional between 2001 and 2013. He currently works as a directeur sportif at Red Bull–Bora–Hansgrohe.

== Palmarès ==
Date	Placing	Event	Competition	Location	Country
2001	1		Sparkassen Cup		Germany
2001	1	Stage 3	Bałtyk–Karkonosze Tour	Szczecinek	Poland
2001	1	Stage 4	Bałtyk–Karkonosze Tour	Wałcz	Poland
2003	1	Stage 3	Circuit des Ardennes	Sedan	France
2003	1	Stage 1	Flèche du Sud	Rumelange	Luxembourg
2003	1	Stage 2	Bałtyk–Karkonosze Tour	Stargard Szczeciński	Poland
2003	1	Stage 1a	Brandenburg Rundfahrt	Senftenberg	Germany
2003	1	Stage 2	Brandenburg Rundfahrt	Werder	Germany
2003	1	Stage 5	Brandenburg Rundfahrt	Prenzlau	Germany
2004	1	Stage 1	Tour of Greece	Preveza	Greece
2004	1	Stage 2	Tour of Greece		Greece
2004	1	Stage 5	Tour of Greece		Greece
2004	1	Stage 4	Tour of Japan	Motegi	Japan
2004	1	Stage 1	Tour de Tunisie	Bizerte	Tunisia
2004	1	Stage 5	Tour de Tunisie	Sfax	Tunisia
2004	1		Bochum-Steinkuhl		Germany
2004	1	Stage 8	Tour of Qinghai Lake	Xining	China
2005	1	Stage 4	Cinturón a Mallorca	Santa Margalida	Spain
2005	1	Stage 3a	Five Rings of Moscow	Vorobjevskoe Ring	Russia
2006	1	Stage 1	Tour d'Indonesia	Jakarta	Indonesia
2007	1	Stage 1	Bayern Rundfahrt	Gundelfingen	Germany
2007	1	Stage 2	Tour of Qinghai Lake	Bird Island	China
2008	1	Stage 2	Szlakiem Grodów Piastowskich	Lubin	Poland
2008	1	Stage 1	Course de la Solidarité Olympique	Pabianice	Poland
2008	1	Stage 6	Course de la Solidarité Olympique	Nowy Sącz	Poland
2009	1	Stage 3	Tour of Turkey	Bodrum	Turkey
2010	1		Memoriał Andrzeja Trochanowskiego		Poland
2010	1	Stage 4	Szlakiem Grodów Piastowskich	Legnica	Poland
2010	1	Stage 2	Course de la Solidarité Olympique	Bełchatów	Poland
2010	1	Stage 3	Course de la Solidarité Olympique	Skarżysko-Kamienna	Poland
2010	1	Stage 6	Course de la Solidarité Olympique	Jarosław	Poland
2010	1	Prologue	Czech Cycling Tour	Olomouc	Czech Republic
2011	1		Memoriał Andrzeja Trochanowskiego		Poland
2011	1		Neuseen Classics	Zwenkau	Germany
2011	1	Stage 2	Course de la Solidarité Olympique	Kraków	Poland
2011	1	Prologue	Dookoła Mazowsza	Służewiec	Poland
2012	1		Neuseen Classics	Zwenkau	Germany
2012	1	Stage 2	Course de la Solidarité Olympique	Sieradz	Poland
2012	1	Stage 3	Course de la Solidarité Olympique	Kutno	Poland
