= Sachsen Tour =

- Map of 2007 Sachsen Tour

Race details
- Date: Late July
- Region: Saxony, Germany
- English name: International Saxony Tour
- Local name: Sachsen-Tour International (in German)
- Discipline: Road
- Competition: UCI Europe Tour
- Type: Stage-race

History
- First edition: 1985
- Editions: 25
- Final edition: 2009
- First winner: Wolfgang Lötzsch (DDR)
- Most wins: Uwe Ampler (DDR); Jörn Reuß (GER); Thomas Liese (GER) (2 wins)
- Final winner: Patrik Sinkewitz (GER)

The Sachsen Tour was a multi-stage road bicycle race held in the region of Saxony, Germany. It was first held in 1985 and wasorganised as a 2.1 event on the UCI Europe Tour from 2005 until its final edition in 2009. Between 1985 and 1995 it was an amateur race.

It was typically held over 5 stages, running through all of Saxony, including flat stages as well as mountain stages in the Ore Mountains.

== Winners ==
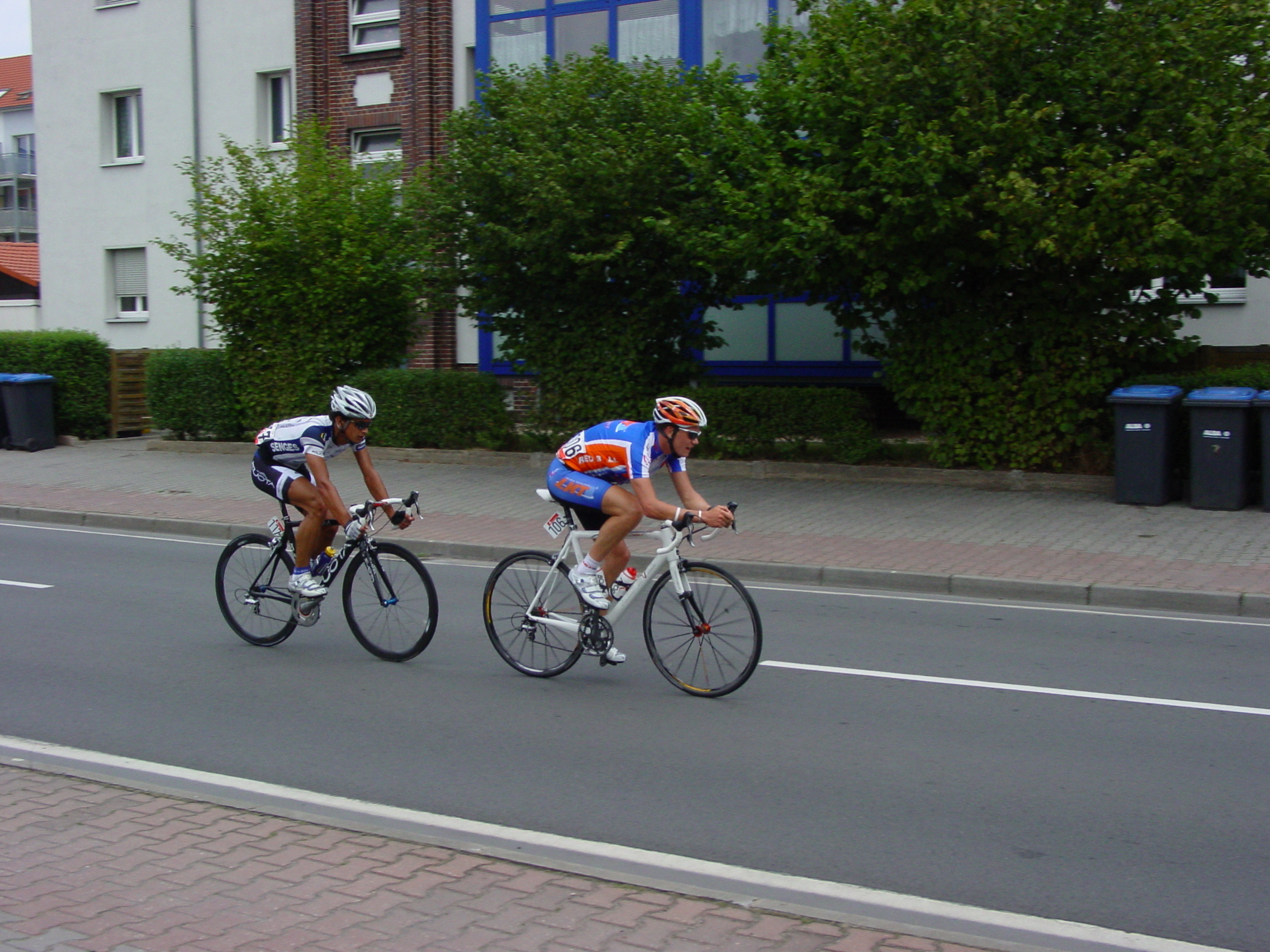
3. stage 2008: Escapee in Wurzen.

Year	Country	Rider	Team
1985	East Germany	Wolfgang Lötzsch	
1986	East Germany	Uwe Ampler	
1987	East Germany	Jens Heppner	
1988	East Germany	Frank Kühn	
1989	East Germany	Uwe Ampler	
1990	Netherlands	Jans Koerts	
1991	Germany	Steffen Blochwitz	
1992	Germany	Jörn Reuß	
1993	New Zealand	Brendan Hart	
1994	New Zealand	Brian Fowler	
1995	Germany	Dirk Müller	
1996	Germany	Jens Voigt	
1997	Russia	Anton Chantyr	
1998	Germany	Thomas Liese	
1999	Germany	Jörn Reuß	
2000	Germany	Thomas Liese	
2001	Denmark	Jørgen Bo Petersen	
2002	Switzerland	Oskar Camenzind	
2003	Germany	Fabian Wegmann	Gerolsteiner
2004	Kazakhstan	Andrey Kashechkin	Crédit Agricole
2005	Australia	Mathew Hayman	Rabobank
2006	Russia	Vladimir Gusev	Discovery Channel
2007	Netherlands	Joost Posthuma	Rabobank
2008	Germany	Bert Grabsch	Columbia
2009	Germany	Patrik Sinkewitz	PSK Whirlpool-Author
