= Neuseen Classics =

Annual road bicycle race in Leipzig, Germany

Race details
- Date: Early June
- Region: Leipzig, Germany
- Local name: Neuseen Classics (in German)
- Discipline: Road
- Competition: UCI Europe Tour
- Type: Single-day

History
- First edition: 2004
- Editions: 9
- Final edition: 2012
- First winner: Lars Wackernagel (GER)
- Most wins: André Schulze (GER) (2 wins)
- Final winner: André Schulze (GER)

The Neuseen Classics – Rund um die Braunkohle was a single-day road bicycle race held annually in Leipzig, Germany.

== Winners ==
Year	Country	Rider	Team
2004	Germany	Lars Wackernagel	Wiesenhof
2005	Poland	Marek Maciejewski	Grupa PSB
2006	Germany	Danilo Hondo	Team Lamonta
2007	France	Denis Flahaut	Jartazi–Promo Fashion
2008	Germany	Steffen Radochla	Elk Haus–Simplon
2009	Germany	André Greipel	Team Columbia–High Road
2010	Germany	Roger Kluge	Team Milram
2011	Germany	André Schulze	CCC–Polsat–Polkowice
2012	Germany	André Schulze	Team NetApp
