= 2013 Tour of Alberta =

2012–13 UCI America Tour

Race details
- Dates: 3 September 2013–8 September 2013
- Stages: 5 + 1 (prologue)
- Distance: 810 km (500 mi)
- Winning time: 17h 48' 40"

Results
Jersey awarded to the overall winner	Winner	Rohan Dennis (AUS)	(Garmin–Sharp)
	Second	Brent Bookwalter (USA)	(BMC Racing Team)
	Third	Damiano Caruso (ITA)	(Cannondale)
Jersey awarded to the points classification winner	Points	Peter Sagan (SVK)	(Cannondale)
Jersey awarded to the mountains classification winner	Mountains	Tom-Jelte Slagter (NED)	(Belkin Pro Cycling)
Jersey awarded to the young rider classification winner	Young rider	Rohan Dennis (AUS)	(Garmin–Sharp)
Jersey awarded to the team classification winner	Team	BMC Racing Team	

The 2013 Tour of Alberta is the inaugural edition of the Tour of Alberta stage race. The inaugural event is included on the UCI America Tour, with a UCI classification of 2.1. As such, the race was only open to teams on the UCI Pro Tour, UCI Professional Continental and UCI Continental circuits. The race takes place between September 3–8, 2013, as a six-day, six-stage race, traversing the province of Alberta. The race commences in Edmonton and finishes Calgary. The 2013 Tour of Alberta was one of seven UCI-ranked stage races in the North America in 2013.

Due to damages caused by the 2013 Alberta floods, various routes were changed.

== Participating teams ==
In July, the Tour of Alberta announced a sixteen-team field, made up of six UCI ProTeams, two UCI Professional Continental Teams, and seven UCI Continental Teams, thus giving the race a total of fifteen-teams. UCI ProTeams Argos–Shimano and Belkin Pro Cycling, are based in the Netherlands, while its counterparts BMC Racing Team and Garmin–Sharp, are based in the United States. Cannondale and Orica–GreenEDGE, are based in the Italy and Australia, respectively; UCI Professional Continental Team Champion System is based in China, while its counterpart, UnitedHealthcare is based in the United States. UCI Continental Teams Bissell, 5-hour Energy, Jelly Belly–Kenda, Optum–Kelly Benefit Strategies, and Team Shartshop-Mountain Khakis are based in the United States. The remaining two teams are based in Canada.

UCI ProTeams

- Argos–Shimano
- Belkin Pro Cycling
- BMC Racing Team
- Cannondale
- Garmin–Sharp
- Orica–GreenEDGE

UCI Professional Continental Teams

- Champion System
- UnitedHealthcare

UCI Continental Teams

- Bissell
- Canadian National Team
- 5-hour Energy
- Equipe Garneau-Québecor
- Jelly Belly–Kenda
- Optum–Kelly Benefit Strategies
- Team Smartshop-Mountain Khakis

== Stages ==
Stage results
Stage	Date	Route	Terrain	Length	Winner
Prologue	September 3	Edmonton to Edmonton	Individual time trial	7 km (4.3 mi)	Peter Sagan (SVK)
1	September 4	Strathcona County to Camrose	Hilly stage	158 km (98 mi)	Peter Sagan (SVK)
2	September 5	Devon to Red Deer	Medium-mountain stage	175 km (109 mi)	Silvan Dillier (SUI)
3	September 6	Strathmore to Drumheller	Hilly stage	169 km (105 mi)	Rohan Dennis (AUS)
4	September 7	Black Diamond to Foothills	Medium-mountain stage	169 km (105 mi)	Cadel Evans (AUS)
5	September 8	Okotoks to Calgary	Hilly stage	132 km (82 mi)	Peter Sagan (SVK)
	Total		810 km (503 mi)		

=== Prologue ===
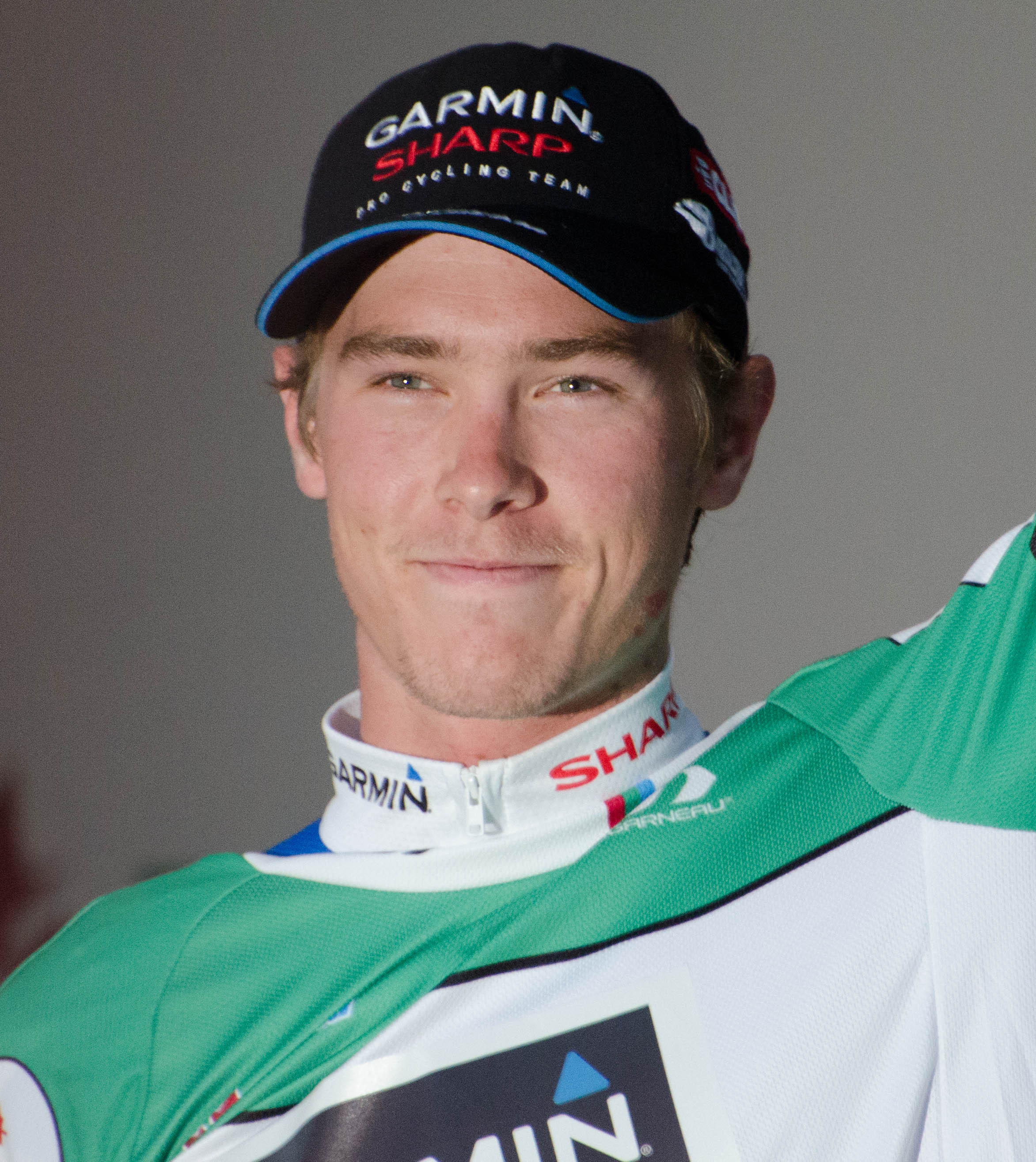
Rohan Dennis in the green jersey.

September 3, 2013 — Edmonton to Edmonton, 7 kilometres (4.3 mi)

Prologue results

	Rider	Team	Time
1	Peter Sagan (SVK)	Cannondale	8' 28"
2	Rohan Dennis (AUS)	Garmin–Sharp	+ 13"
3	Tobias Ludvigsson (SWE)	Argos–Shimano	+ 14"
4	Cadel Evans (AUS)	BMC Racing Team	+ 20"
5	Brent Bookwalter (USA)	BMC Racing Team	+ 21"
6	Chad Haga (USA)	Optum–Kelly Benefit Strategies	+ 23"
7	Pieter Weening (NED)	Orica–GreenEDGE	+ 29"
8	David Zabriskie (USA)	Garmin–Sharp	+ 30"
9	Tom Zirbel (USA)	Optum–Kelly Benefit Strategies	+ 30"
10	Ryder Hesjedal (CAN)	Garmin–Sharp	+ 30"

General classification after Prologue

	Rider	Team	Time
1	Peter Sagan (SVK)	Cannondale	8' 28"
2	Rohan Dennis (AUS)	Garmin–Sharp	+ 13"
3	Tobias Ludvigsson (SWE)	Argos–Shimano	+ 14"
4	Cadel Evans (AUS)	BMC Racing Team	+ 20"
5	Brent Bookwalter (USA)	BMC Racing Team	+ 21"
6	Chad Haga (USA)	Optum–Kelly Benefit Strategies	+ 23"
7	Pieter Weening (NED)	Orica–GreenEDGE	+ 29"
8	David Zabriskie (USA)	Garmin–Sharp	+ 30"
9	Tom Zirbel (USA)	Optum–Kelly Benefit Strategies	+ 30"
10	Ryder Hesjedal (CAN)	Garmin–Sharp	+ 30"

=== Stage 1 ===
September 4, 2013 — Strathcona County to Camrose, 158 kilometres (98 mi)

Stage 1 results

	Rider	Team	Time
1	Peter Sagan (SVK)	Cannondale	3h 22' 17"
2	Eric Young (USA)	Optum–Kelly Benefit Strategies	+ 0"
3	Moreno Hofland (NED)	Belkin Pro Cycling	+ 0"
4	Ryan Anderson (CAN)	Optum–Kelly Benefit Strategies	+ 0"
5	Luka Mezgec (SLO)	Argos–Shimano	+ 0"
6	Brent Bookwalter (USA)	BMC Racing Team	+ 0"
7	Fabian Wegmann (GER)	Garmin–Sharp	+ 0"
8	Matthias Friedemann (GER)	Champion System	+ 0"
9	Tobias Ludvigsson (SWE)	Argos–Shimano	+ 0"
10	John Murphy (USA)	UnitedHealthcare	+ 0"

General classification after Stage 1

	Rider	Team	Time
1	Peter Sagan (SVK)	Cannondale	3h 30' 35"
2	Rohan Dennis (AUS)	Garmin–Sharp	+ 23"
3	Tobias Ludvigsson (SWE)	Argos–Shimano	+ 24"
4	Cadel Evans (AUS)	BMC Racing Team	+ 30"
5	Brent Bookwalter (USA)	BMC Racing Team	+ 31"
6	Pieter Weening (NED)	Orica–GreenEDGE	+ 39"
7	Patrick Gretsch (GER)	Argos–Shimano	+ 39"
8	Tom Zirbel (USA)	Optum–Kelly Benefit Strategies	+ 40"
9	Ryder Hesjedal (CAN)	Garmin–Sharp	+ 40"
10	Robert Gesink (NED)	Belkin Pro Cycling	+ 41"

=== Stage 2 ===
September 5, 2013 — Devon to Red Deer, 175 kilometres (109 mi)

Stage 2 results

	Rider	Team	Time
1	Silvan Dillier (SUI)	BMC Racing Team	3h 32' 47"
2	Serghei Tvetcov (MDA)	Jelly Belly–Kenda	+ 0"
3	Peter Sagan (SVK)	Cannondale	+ 16"
4	Aidis Kruopis (LTU)	Orica–GreenEDGE	+ 18"
5	Luka Mezgec (SLO)	Argos–Shimano	+ 18"
6	Nicolai Brøchner (DEN)	Bissell	+ 18"
7	Eric Young (USA)	Optum–Kelly Benefit Strategies	+ 18"
8	Travis Mccabe (USA)	Team Smartshop-Mountain Khakis	+ 18"
9	Dennis Van Winden (NED)	Belkin Pro Cycling	+ 18"
10	Jeremy Vennell (NZL)	Bissell	+ 18"

General classification after Stage 2

	Rider	Team	Time
1	Peter Sagan (SVK)	Cannondale	7h 03' 34"
2	Rohan Dennis (AUS)	Garmin–Sharp	+ 26"
3	Tobias Ludvigsson (SWE)	Argos–Shimano	+ 28"
4	Cadel Evans (AUS)	BMC Racing Team	+ 36"
5	Brent Bookwalter (USA)	BMC Racing Team	+ 37"
6	Pieter Weening (NED)	Orica–GreenEDGE	+ 39"
7	Patrick Gretsch (GER)	Argos–Shimano	+ 43"
8	Tom Zirbel (USA)	Optum–Kelly Benefit Strategies	+ 46"
9	Ryder Hesjedal (CAN)	Garmin–Sharp	+ 46"
10	Robert Gesink (NED)	Belkin Pro Cycling	+ 47"

=== Stage 3 ===
September 6, 2013 — Strathmore to Drumheller, 169 kilometres (105 mi)

Stage 3 results

	Rider	Team	Time
1	Rohan Dennis (AUS)	Garmin–Sharp	3h 55' 31"
2	Brent Bookwalter (USA)	BMC Racing Team	+ 0"
3	Damiano Caruso (ITA)	Cannondale	+ 0"
4	Patrick Gretsch (GER)	Argos–Shimano	+ 0"
5	Robert Gesink (NED)	Visma–Lease a Bike	+ 0"
6	Steve Morabito (SUI)	BMC Racing Team	+ 0"
7	Ryan Anderson (CAN)	Optum–Kelly Benefit Strategies	+ 9"
8	Marcus Burghardt (GER)	BMC Racing Team	+ 9"
9	Jakub Novak (CZE)	BMC Racing Team	+ 9"
10	Jeremy Vennell (NZL)	Bissell	+ 9"

General classification after Stage 3

	Rider	Team	Time
1	Rohan Dennis (AUS)	Garmin–Sharp	10h 59' 18"
2	Brent Bookwalter (USA)	BMC Racing Team	+ 18"
3	Damiano Caruso (ITA)	Cannondale	+ 30"
4	Patrick Gretsch (GER)	Argos–Shimano	+ 31"
5	Robert Gesink (NED)	Visma–Lease a Bike	+ 34"
6	Robert Sweeting (USA)	5-hour Energy	+ 54"
7	Francisco Mancebo (ESP)	5-hour Energy	+ 55"
8	Ryan Anderson (CAN)	Optum–Kelly Benefit Strategies	+ 56"
9	Matthias Friedemann (GER)	Champion System	+ 1' 12"
10	Steven Kruijswijk (NED)	Belkin Pro Cycling	+ 1' 15"

=== Stage 4 ===
September 7, 2013 — Black Diamond to Foothills, 169 kilometres (105 mi)

Stage 4 results

	Rider	Team	Time
1	Cadel Evans (AUS)	BMC Racing Team	3h 57' 18"
2	Simon Geschke (GER)	Argos–Shimano	+ 0"
3	Tom-Jelte Slagter (NED)	Belkin Pro Cycling	+ 0"
4	Benjamin Day (AUS)	UnitedHealthcare	+ 0"
5	Antoine Duchesne (CAN)	Canadian National Team	+ 0"
6	Scott Zwizanski (USA)	Optum–Kelly Benefit Strategies	+ 1' 49"
7	Nic Hamilton (CAN)	Jelly Belly–Kenda	+ 1' 49"
8	Clay Murfet (AUS)	Team Smartshop-Mountain Khakis	+ 1' 49"
9	Ryan Roth (CAN)	Champion System	+ 1' 49"
10	Luke Keough (USA)	UnitedHealthcare	+ 9' 44"

General classification after Stage 4

	Rider	Team	Time
1	Rohan Dennis (AUS)	Garmin–Sharp	15h 06' 20"
2	Brent Bookwalter (USA)	BMC Racing Team	+ 18"
3	Damiano Caruso (ITA)	Cannondale	+ 30"
4	Patrick Gretsch (GER)	Argos–Shimano	+ 31"
5	Robert Gesink (NED)	Visma–Lease a Bike	+ 34"
6	Robert Sweeting (USA)	5-hour Energy	+ 54"
7	Francisco Mancebo (ESP)	5-hour Energy	+ 55"
8	Ryan Anderson (CAN)	Optum–Kelly Benefit Strategies	+ 56"
9	Matthias Friedemann (GER)	Champion System	+ 1' 12"
10	Steven Kruijswijk (NED)	Belkin Pro Cycling	+ 1' 15"

=== Stage 5 ===
September 8, 2013 — Okotoks to Calgary, 132 kilometres (82 mi)

Stage 5 results

	Rider	Team	Time
1	Peter Sagan (SVK)	Cannondale	2h 42' 20"
2	Luka Mezgec (SLO)	Argos–Shimano	+ 0"
3	Robert Förster (GER)	UnitedHealthcare	+ 0"
4	Luke Keough (USA)	UnitedHealthcare	+ 0"
5	Nicolai Brøchner (DEN)	Bissell	+ 0"
6	Bradly Huff (USA)	Jelly Belly–Kenda	+ 0"
7	Brent Bookwalter (USA)	BMC Racing Team	+ 0"
8	Ryan Anderson (CAN)	Optum–Kelly Benefit Strategies	+ 0"
9	Tomas Vaitkus (LTU)	Orica–GreenEDGE	+ 0"
10	Pierrick Naud (CAN)	Equipe Garneau-Québecor	+ 0"

General classification after Stage 5

	Rider	Team	Time
1	Rohan Dennis (AUS)	Garmin–Sharp	17h 48' 40"
2	Brent Bookwalter (USA)	BMC Racing Team	+ 18"
3	Damiano Caruso (ITA)	Cannondale	+ 30"
4	Patrick Gretsch (GER)	Argos–Shimano	+ 31"
5	Robert Gesink (NED)	Visma–Lease a Bike	+ 41"
6	Robert Sweeting (USA)	5-hour Energy	+ 54"
7	Francisco Mancebo (ESP)	5-hour Energy	+ 55"
8	Ryan Anderson (CAN)	Optum–Kelly Benefit Strategies	+ 56"
9	Matthias Friedemann (GER)	Champion System	+ 1' 19"
10	Steven Kruijswijk (NED)	Belkin Pro Cycling	+ 1' 22"

== Classification leadership ==
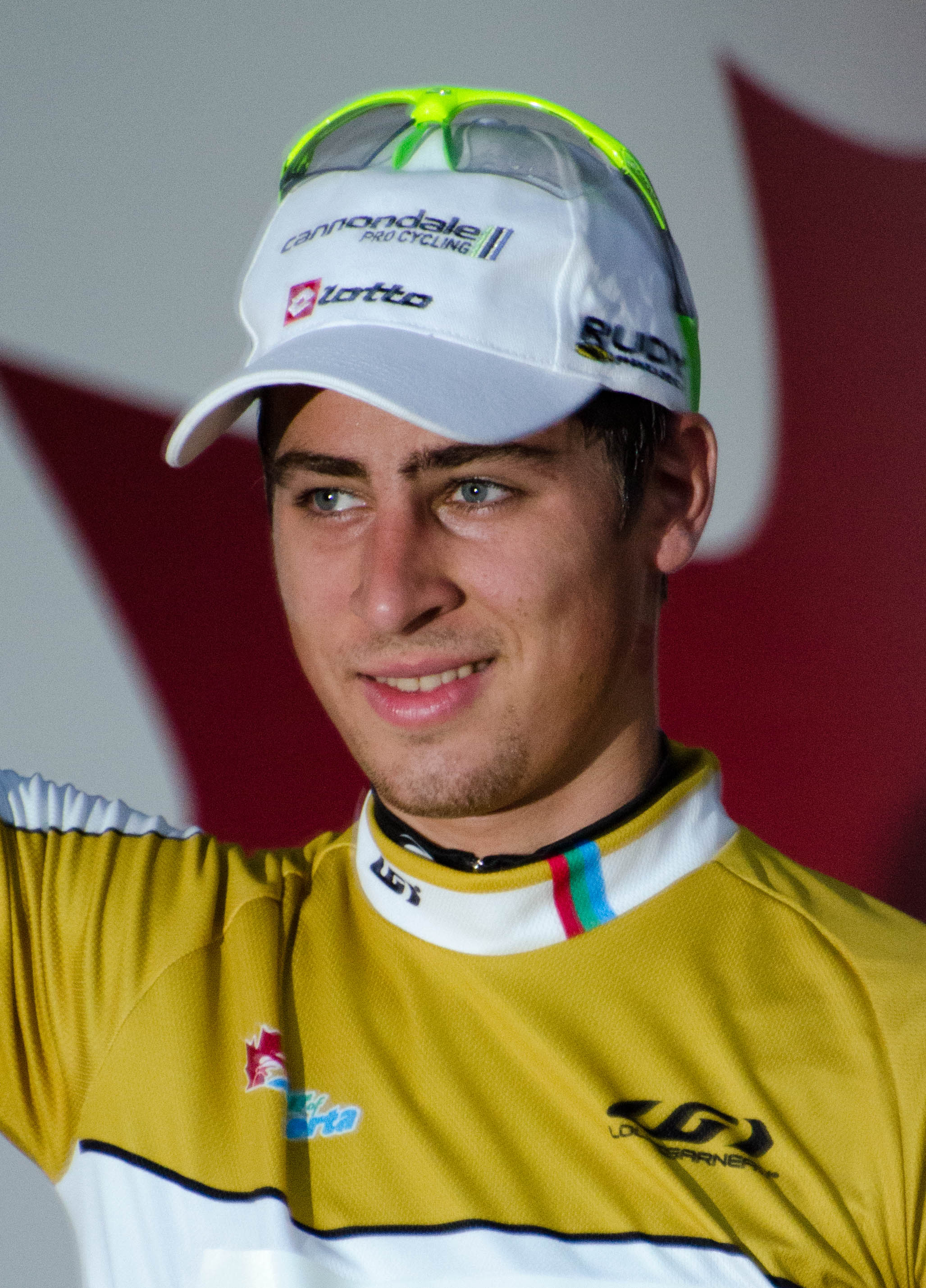
Peter Sagan in the yellow jersey.

In the 2013 Tour of Alberta, five jerseys are awarded. For the general classification, calculated by adding the finishing times of the stages per cyclist, the leader receives a yellow jersey. This classification is considered the most important of the USA Pro Cycling Challenge, and the winner of the general classification will be considered the winner of the event.

Additionally, there is also a sprints classification, akin to what is called the points classification in other races, which awards a green jersey. Points are gathered at sprint line performances as well as finishing the stage in the top-fifteen places.

There is also a mountains classification, which awards a polkadot jersey. In the mountains classification, points are won by reaching the top of a mountain before other cyclists. Each climb is categorized, either first, second, third, or fourth category, with more points available for the harder climbs.

There is also a youth classification. This classification is calculated the same way as the general classification, but only young cyclists (under 25) are included. The leader of the young rider classification receives a white jersey.

The red jersey is exclusive to Canadian riders in the race; the jersey is awarded to the Canadian with the best cumulative time.

The last jersey is awarded to the most aggressive rider of a stage for him to wear on the next stage. It is generally awarded to a rider who attacks constantly or spends a lot of time in the breakaways. This jersey is blue.

There is also a classification for teams. In this classification, the times of the best three cyclists per stage are added, and the team with the lowest time is the leader.

Stage	Winner	General classification	Sprints classification	Mountains classification	Young rider classification	Canadian rider classification	Most Aggressive	Team classification
P	Peter Sagan	Peter Sagan	Rohan Dennis	Tom-Jelte Slagter	Peter Sagan	Ryder Hesjedal	—N/a	Garmin–Sharp
1	Peter Sagan	Peter Sagan	Peter Sagan	Tom-Jelte Slagter	Peter Sagan	Ryder Hesjedal	Jeremy Powers	Garmin–Sharp
2	Silvan Dillier	Peter Sagan	Peter Sagan	Tom-Jelte Slagter	Peter Sagan	Ryder Hesjedal	Serghei Tvetcov	BMC Racing Team
3	Rohan Dennis	Rohan Dennis	Peter Sagan	Robert Gesink	Rohan Dennis	Ryan Anderson	Steve Morabito	BMC Racing Team
4	Cadel Evans	Rohan Dennis	Peter Sagan	Tom-Jelte Slagter	Rohan Dennis	Ryan Anderson	Antoine Duchesne	BMC Racing Team
5	Peter Sagan	Rohan Dennis	Peter Sagan	Tom-Jelte Slagter	Rohan Dennis	Ryan Anderson	Adam Farabaugh	BMC Racing Team
Final		Rohan Dennis	Peter Sagan	Tom-Jelte Slagter	Rohan Dennis	Ryan Anderson	—N/a	BMC Racing Team

== Classification standings ==
Legend
Yellow jersey	Denotes the leader of the General classification	Polka dot jersey	Denotes the leader of the Mountains classification
Green jersey	Denotes the leader of the Points classification	White jersey	Denotes the leader of the Young rider classification
Red jersey	Denotes the leader of the Canadian rider classification	Yellow number	Denotes the leader of the Team classification

=== General classification ===
	Rider	Team	Time
1	Rohan Dennis (AUS)	Garmin–Sharp	17h 48' 40"
2	Brent Bookwalter (USA)	BMC Racing Team	+ 18"
3	Damiano Caruso (ITA)	Cannondale	+ 30"
4	Patrick Gretsch (GER)	Argos–Shimano	+ 31"
5	Robert Gesink (NED)	Visma–Lease a Bike	+ 41"
6	Robert Sweeting (USA)	5-hour Energy	+ 54"
7	Francisco Mancebo (ESP)	5-hour Energy	+ 55"
8	Ryan Anderson (CAN)	Optum–Kelly Benefit Strategies	+ 56"
9	Matthias Friedemann (GER)	Champion System	+ 1' 19"
10	Steven Kruijswijk (NED)	Belkin Pro Cycling	+ 1' 22"

=== Points classification ===
	Rider	Team	Points
1	Peter Sagan (SVK)	Cannondale	40
2	Rohan Dennis (AUS)	Garmin–Sharp	25
3	Luka Mezgec (SLO)	Argos–Shimano	24
4	Eric Young (USA)	Optum–Kelly Benefit Strategies	21
5	Brent Bookwalter (USA)	BMC Racing Team	21
6	Simon Geschke (GER)	Argos–Shimano	17
7	Cadel Evans (AUS)	BMC Racing Team	15
8	Silvan Dillier (SWI)	BMC Racing Team	15
9	Ryan Anderson (CAN)	Optum–Kelly Benefit Strategies	15
10	Damiano Caruso (ITA)	Cannondale	13

=== King of the Mountains classification ===
	Rider	Team	Points
1	Tom-Jelte Slagter (NED)	Belkin Pro Cycling	37
2	Robert Gesink (NED)	Belkin Pro Cycling	25
3	Nic Hamilton (CAN)	Jelly Belly–Kenda	18
4	Rohan Dennis (AUS)	Garmin–Sharp	16
5	Brent Bookwalter (USA)	BMC Racing Team	15
6	Antoine Duchesne (CAN)	Canadian National Team	12
7	Benjamin Day (AUS)	UnitedHealthcare	12
8	Simon Geschke (GER)	Argos–Shimano	11
9	Serghei Tvetcov (MDA)	Jelly Belly–Kenda	10
10	Kristofer Dahl (CAN)	Team Smartshop-Mountain Khakis	10

=== Young Riders classification ===
	Rider	Team	Time
1	Rohan Dennis (AUS)	Garmin–Sharp	17h 48' 40"
2	Jakub Novak (CZE)	BMC Racing Team	+ 1' 27"
3	Tom-Jelte Slagter (NED)	Belkin Pro Cycling	+ 8' 04"
4	Alexander Cataford (CAN)	Equipe Garneau-Québecor	+ 8' 23"
5	Antoine Duchesne (CAN)	Canadian National Team	+ 8' 26"
6	Clay Murfet (AUS)	Team Smartshop-Mountain Khakis	+ 10' 59"
7	Peter Sagan (SVK)	Cannondale	+ 16' 25"
8	Tobias Ludvigsson (SWE)	Argos–Shimano	+ 17' 10"
9	Silvan Dillier (SWI)	BMC Racing Team	+ 17' 33"
10	Eric Young (USA)	Optum–Kelly Benefit Strategies	+ 17' 41"

=== Team classification ===
	Team	Time
1	BMC Racing Team	53h 17' 43"
2	5-hour Energy	+ 12' 13"
3	Belkin Pro Cycling	+ 18' 17"
4	Argos–Shimano	+ 33' 37"
5	UnitedHealthcare	+ 35' 13"
6	Optum–Kelly Benefit Strategies	+ 36' 01"
7	Champion System	+ 37' 24"
8	Garmin–Sharp	+ 43' 29"
9	Cannondale	+ 43' 46"
10	Orica–GreenEDGE	+ 44' 21"
