= 2014 Tour of Alberta =

2013–14 UCI America Tour

Race details
- Dates: September 2–7, 2014
- Stages: 5 + 1 (prologue)
- Distance: 737.8 km (458.4 mi)
- Winning time: 16h 07' 56"

Results
Jersey awarded to the overall winner	Winner	Daryl Impey (RSA)	(Orica–GreenEDGE)
	Second	Tom Dumoulin (NED)	(Giant–Shimano)
	Third	Ruben Zepuntke (GER)	(Bissell Development Team)
Jersey awarded to the points classification winner	Points	Ramūnas Navardauskas (LTU)	(Garmin–Sharp)
Jersey awarded to the mountains classification winner	Mountains	Simon Yates (GBR)	(Orica–GreenEDGE)
Jersey awarded to the youth classification winner	Youth	Tom Dumoulin (NED)	(Giant–Shimano)
Jersey awarded to the team classification winner	Team	Garmin–Sharp	

The 2014 Tour of Alberta was the second edition of the Tour of Alberta stage race, a 2.1 race included on the UCI America Tour. As such, the race was only open to teams on the UCI Pro Tour, UCI Professional Continental and UCI Continental circuits. The race took place between September 2–7, 2014, as a six-day, six-stage race, traversing the province of Alberta. The race commenced in Calgary and finished in Edmonton.

== Participating teams ==
UCI ProTeams

- Belkin Pro Cycling
- Cannondale
- Garmin–Sharp
- Giant–Shimano
- Orica–GreenEDGE

UCI Professional Continental teams

- UnitedHealthcare

UCI Continental teams

- 5-hour Energy
- Bissell Development Team
- Garneau–Québecor
- Hincapie Sportswear Development Team
- Jelly Belly–Maxxis
- Optum–Kelly Benefit Strategies
- Silber Pro Cycling Team
- Team SmartStop

National teams

- Canada

== Stages ==
Stage results
Stage	Date	Route	Terrain	Length	Winner	Ref
Prologue	September 2	Calgary to Calgary	Individual time trial	4 km (2.5 mi)	Tom Dumoulin (NED)	
1	September 3	Lethbridge to Lethbridge	Hilly stage	143 km (89 mi)	Ruben Zepuntke (GER)	
2	September 4	Innisfail to Red Deer	Flat stage	145.3 km (90.3 mi)	Jonas Ahlstrand (SWE)	
3	September 5	Wetaskiwin to Edmonton	Flat stage	157.9 km (98.1 mi)	Sep Vanmarcke (BEL)	
4	September 6	Edmonton to Strathcona County	Flat stage	163.5 km (101.6 mi)	Theo Bos (NED)	
5	September 7	Edmonton to Edmonton	Hilly stage	124.1 km (77.1 mi)	Daryl Impey (RSA)	
	Total		737.8 km (458 mi)			

=== Prologue ===
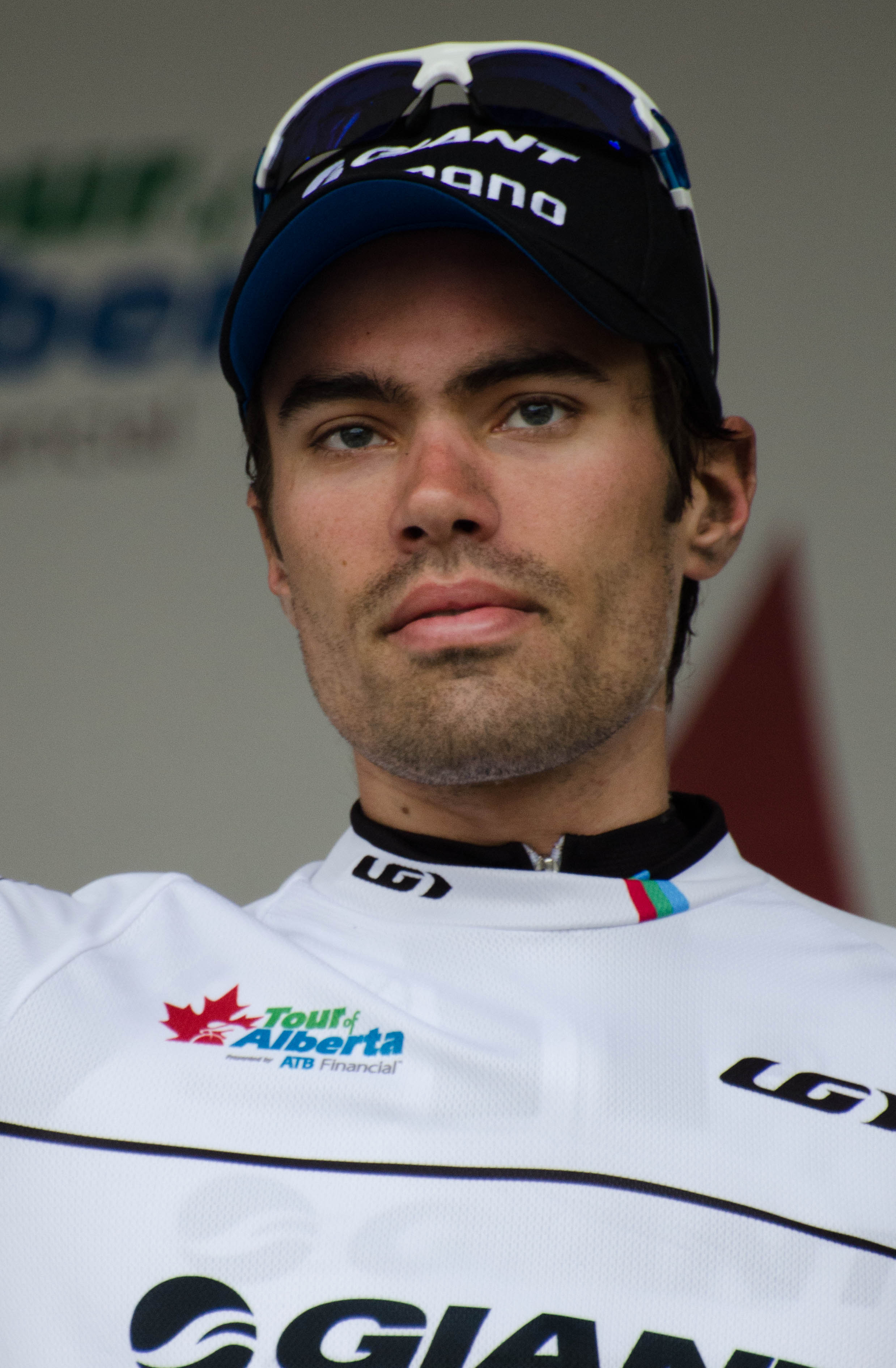
Tom Dumoulin, winner of the prologue and youth classification

September 2, 2014 — Calgary to Calgary, 4 kilometres (2.5 mi)

Prologue result & General classification after Prologue

	Rider	Team	Time
1	Tom Dumoulin (NED)	Giant–Shimano	5' 59"
2	Serghei Țvetcov (ROM)	Jelly Belly–Maxxis	+ 14"
3	Tom Danielson (USA)	Garmin–Sharp	+ 17"
4	Davide Villella (ITA)	Cannondale	+ 18"
5	Daniel Summerhill (USA)	UnitedHealthcare	+ 18"
6	Phil Gaimon (USA)	Garmin–Sharp	+ 19"
7	Joey Rosskopf (USA)	Hincapie Sportswear Development Team	+ 22"
8	Zachary Bell (CAN)	Team SmartStop	+ 22"
9	Christian Meier (CAN)	Orica–GreenEDGE	+ 23"
10	Ryan Roth (CAN)	Silber Pro Cycling Team	+ 23"

=== Stage 1 ===
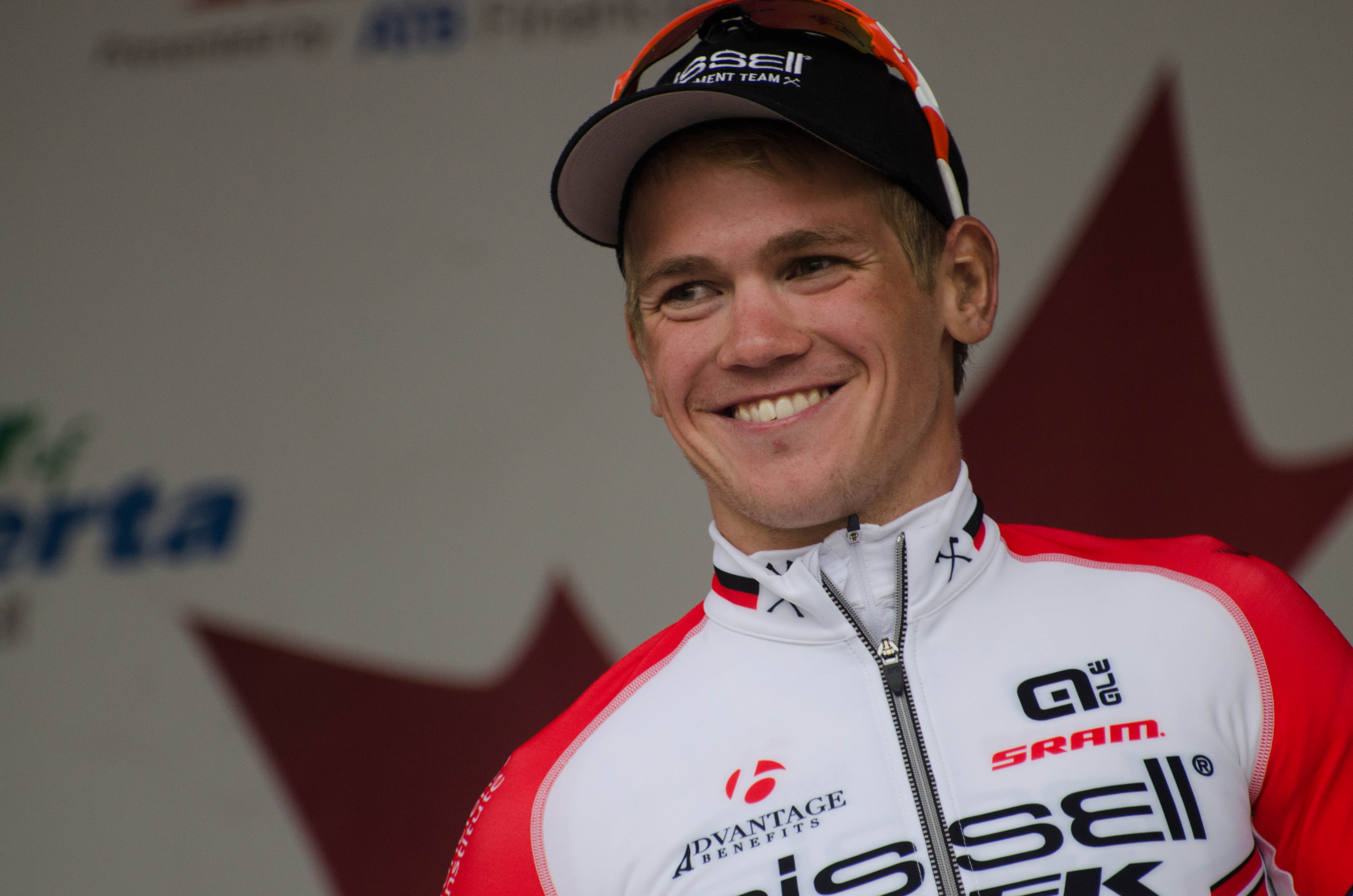
Ruben Zepuntke, winner of stage 1

September 3, 2014 — Lethbridge to Lethbridge, 143 kilometres (89 mi)

Stage 1 results

	Rider	Team	Time
1	Ruben Zepuntke (GER)	Bissell Development Team	3h 18' 10"
2	Ramūnas Navardauskas (LTU)	Garmin–Sharp	+ 0"
3	Ryan Anderson (CAN)	Optum–Kelly Benefit Strategies	+ 0"
4	Dion Smith (NZL)	Hincapie Sportswear Development Team	+ 0"
5	Ben King (USA)	Garmin–Sharp	+ 0"
6	Daniel Summerhill (USA)	UnitedHealthcare	+ 0"
7	Tyler Magner (USA)	Hincapie Sportswear Development Team	+ 0"
8	Fabian Wegmann (GER)	Garmin–Sharp	+ 0"
9	James Oram (NZL)	Bissell Development Team	+ 0"
10	Sep Vanmarcke (BEL)	Belkin Pro Cycling	+ 0"

General classification after Stage 1

	Rider	Team	Time
1	Tom Dumoulin (NED)	Giant–Shimano	3h 24' 09"
2	Ruben Zepuntke (GER)	Bissell Development Team	+ 13"
3	Serghei Țvetcov (ROM)	Jelly Belly–Maxxis	+ 14"
4	Tom Danielson (USA)	Garmin–Sharp	+ 17"
5	Davide Villella (ITA)	Cannondale	+ 18"
6	Daniel Summerhill (USA)	UnitedHealthcare	+ 18"
7	Ryan Anderson (CAN)	Optum–Kelly Benefit Strategies	+ 19"
8	Joey Rosskopf (USA)	Hincapie Sportswear Development Team	+ 22"
9	Christian Meier (CAN)	Orica–GreenEDGE	+ 23"
10	Daryl Impey (RSA)	Orica–GreenEDGE	+ 23"

=== Stage 2 ===
September 4, 2014 — Innisfail to Red Deer, 145.3 kilometres (90.3 mi)

Stage 2 results

	Rider	Team	Time
1	Jonas Ahlstrand (SWE)	Giant–Shimano	3h 02' 14"
2	Theo Bos (NED)	Belkin Pro Cycling	+ 0"
3	Ruben Zepuntke (GER)	Bissell Development Team	+ 0"
4	Eric Young (USA)	Optum–Kelly Benefit Strategies	+ 0"
5	Matej Mohorič (SLO)	Cannondale	+ 0"
6	Ramūnas Navardauskas (LTU)	Garmin–Sharp	+ 0"
7	Nicolai Brøchner (DEN)	Bissell Development Team	+ 0"
8	Serghei Țvetcov (ROM)	Jelly Belly–Maxxis	+ 0"
9	Nick van der Lijke (NED)	Belkin Pro Cycling	+ 0"
10	Daniel Summerhill (USA)	UnitedHealthcare	+ 0"

General classification after Stage 2

	Rider	Team	Time
1	Tom Dumoulin (NED)	Giant–Shimano	6h 26' 23"
2	Ruben Zepuntke (GER)	Bissell Development Team	+ 9"
3	Serghei Țvetcov (ROM)	Jelly Belly–Maxxis	+ 14"
4	Tom Danielson (USA)	Garmin–Sharp	+ 17"
5	Ryan Anderson (CAN)	Optum–Kelly Benefit Strategies	+ 17"
6	Daryl Impey (RSA)	Orica–GreenEDGE	+ 18"
7	Davide Villella (ITA)	Cannondale	+ 18"
8	Daniel Summerhill (USA)	UnitedHealthcare	+ 18"
9	Joey Rosskopf (USA)	Hincapie Sportswear Development Team	+ 22"
10	Christian Meier (CAN)	Orica–GreenEDGE	+ 23"

=== Stage 3 ===
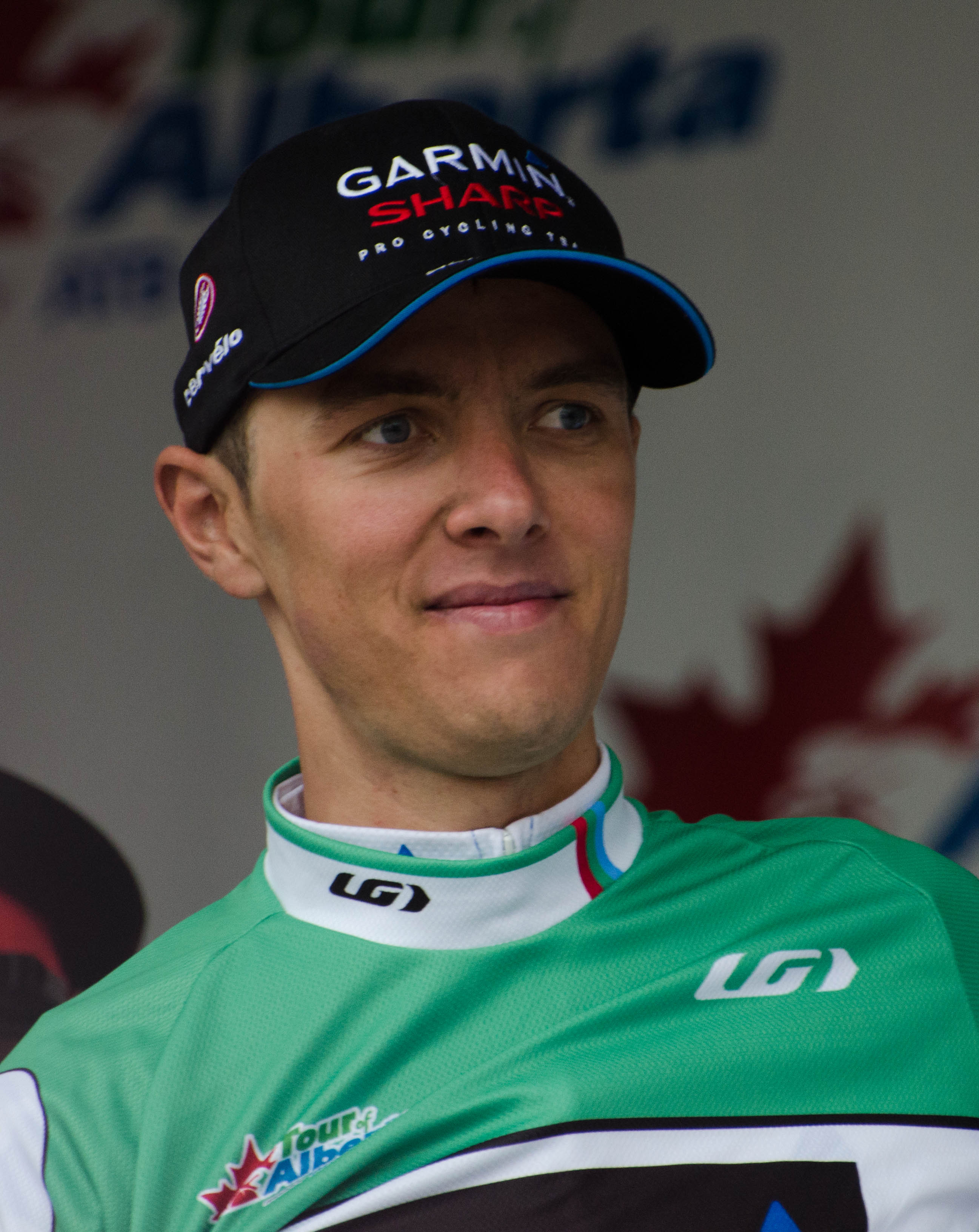
Ramūnas Navardauskas, winner of the sprint classification

September 5, 2014 — Wetaskiwin to Edmonton, 157.9 kilometres (98.1 mi)

Stage 3 results

	Rider	Team	Time
1	Sep Vanmarcke (BEL)	Belkin Pro Cycling	3h 12' 11"
2	Ramūnas Navardauskas (LTU)	Garmin–Sharp	+ 0"
3	Leigh Howard (AUS)	Orica–GreenEDGE	+ 0"
4	Aidis Kruopis (LTU)	Orica–GreenEDGE	+ 11"
5	Steele Von Hoff (AUS)	Garmin–Sharp	+ 11"
6	Daniel Summerhill (USA)	UnitedHealthcare	+ 11"
7	Serghei Țvetcov (ROM)	Jelly Belly–Maxxis	+ 11"
8	Ruben Zepuntke (GER)	Bissell Development Team	+ 11"
9	Nick van der Lijke (NED)	Belkin Pro Cycling	+ 11"
10	Nicolai Brøchner (DEN)	Bissell Development Team	+ 11"

General classification after Stage 3

	Rider	Team	Time
1	Tom Dumoulin (NED)	Giant–Shimano	9h 38' 45"
2	Ruben Zepuntke (GER)	Bissell Development Team	+ 8"
3	Ramūnas Navardauskas (LTU)	Garmin–Sharp	+ 13"
4	Serghei Țvetcov (ROM)	Jelly Belly–Maxxis	+ 14"
5	Leigh Howard (AUS)	Orica–GreenEDGE	+ 15"
6	Daryl Impey (RSA)	Orica–GreenEDGE	+ 15"
7	Ryan Anderson (CAN)	Optum–Kelly Benefit Strategies	+ 16"
8	Daniel Summerhill (USA)	UnitedHealthcare	+ 18"
9	James Oram (NZL)	Bissell Development Team	+ 23"
10	Pieter Weening (NED)	Orica–GreenEDGE	+ 26"

=== Stage 4 ===
September 6, 2014 — Edmonton to Strathcona County, 163.5 kilometres (101.6 mi)

Stage 4 results

	Rider	Team	Time
1	Theo Bos (NED)	Belkin Pro Cycling	3h 42' 50"
2	Daryl Impey (RSA)	Orica–GreenEDGE	+ 0"
3	Jure Kocjan (SLO)	Team SmartStop	+ 0"
4	Robert Sweeting (USA)	5-hour Energy	+ 0"
5	Robert Förster (GER)	UnitedHealthcare	+ 0"
6	Ramūnas Navardauskas (LTU)	Garmin–Sharp	+ 0"
7	Steele Von Hoff (NZL)	Garmin–Sharp	+ 0"
8	Nicolai Brøchner (DEN)	Bissell Development Team	+ 0"
9	Tyler Magner (USA)	Hincapie Sportswear Development Team	+ 0"
10	Ben King (USA)	Garmin–Sharp	+ 0"

General classification after Stage 4

	Rider	Team	Time
1	Tom Dumoulin (NED)	Giant–Shimano	13h 21' 35"
2	Ruben Zepuntke (GER)	Bissell Development Team	+ 8"
3	Daryl Impey (RSA)	Orica–GreenEDGE	+ 9"
4	Ramūnas Navardauskas (LTU)	Garmin–Sharp	+ 13"
5	Serghei Țvetcov (ROM)	Jelly Belly–Maxxis	+ 14"
6	Leigh Howard (AUS)	Orica–GreenEDGE	+ 15"
7	Ryan Anderson (CAN)	Optum–Kelly Benefit Strategies	+ 16"
8	Daniel Summerhill (USA)	UnitedHealthcare	+ 18"
9	James Oram (NZL)	Bissell Development Team	+ 23"
10	Pieter Weening (NED)	Orica–GreenEDGE	+ 26"

=== Stage 5 ===
September 7, 2014 — Edmonton to Edmonton, 124.1 kilometres (77.1 mi)

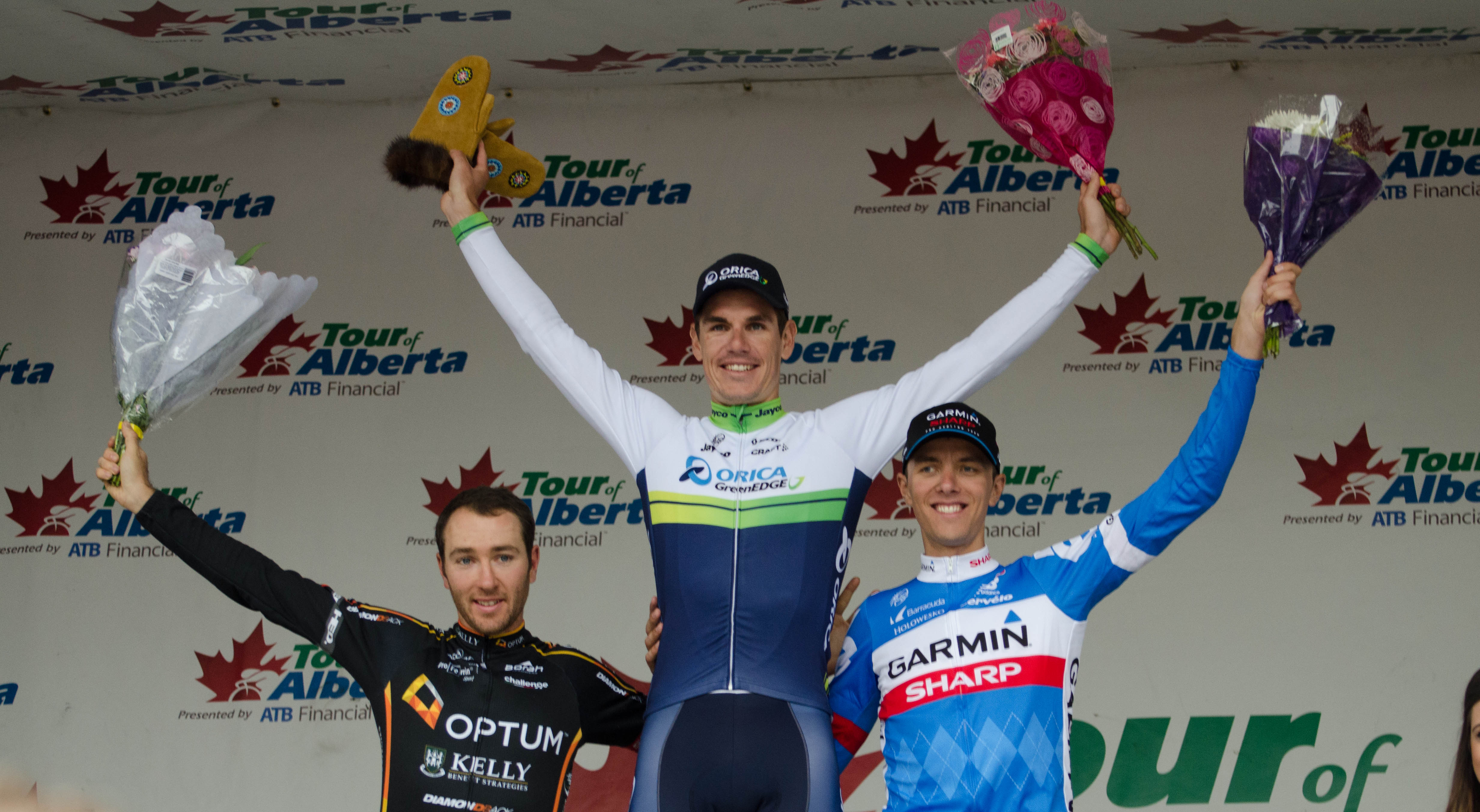
Stage 5 podium

Stage 5 results

	Rider	Team	Time
1	Daryl Impey (RSA)	Orica–GreenEDGE	2h 46' 22"
2	Ryan Anderson (CAN)	Optum–Kelly Benefit Strategies	+ 0"
3	Ramūnas Navardauskas (LTU)	Garmin–Sharp	+ 0"
4	Sep Vanmarcke (BEL)	Belkin Pro Cycling	+ 0"
5	Kiel Reijnen (USA)	UnitedHealthcare	+ 0"
6	Nick van der Lijke (NED)	Belkin Pro Cycling	+ 0"
7	Serghei Țvetcov (ROM)	Jelly Belly–Maxxis	+ 0"
8	Daniel Summerhill (USA)	UnitedHealthcare	+ 0"
9	Dion Smith (NZL)	Hincapie Sportswear Development Team	+ 0"
10	Leigh Howard (AUS)	Orica–GreenEDGE	+ 0"

Final General Classification

	Rider	Team	Time
1	Daryl Impey (RSA)	Orica–GreenEDGE	16h 07' 56"
2	Tom Dumoulin (NED)	Giant–Shimano	+ 1"
3	Ruben Zepuntke (GER)	Bissell Development Team	+ 9"
4	Ramūnas Navardauskas (LTU)	Garmin–Sharp	+ 10"
5	Ryan Anderson (CAN)	Optum–Kelly Benefit Strategies	+ 11"
6	Serghei Țvetcov (ROM)	Jelly Belly–Maxxis	+ 15"
7	Leigh Howard (AUS)	Orica–GreenEDGE	+ 16"
8	Daniel Summerhill (USA)	UnitedHealthcare	+ 19"
9	Sep Vanmarcke (BEL)	Belkin Pro Cycling	+ 31"
10	James Oram (NZL)	Bissell Development Team	+ 31"

== Classification leadership ==
Stage	Winner	General classification	Sprints classification	Mountains classification	Young rider classification	Canadian rider classification	Most Aggressive	Team classification
P	Tom Dumoulin	Tom Dumoulin	Tom Dumoulin	—	Tom Dumoulin	Zachary Bell	Daniel Summerhill	Garmin–Sharp
1	Ruben Zepuntke	Tom Dumoulin	Ruben Zepuntke	Robin Carpenter	Tom Dumoulin	Ryan Anderson	Mathew Hayman	Orica–GreenEDGE
2	Jonas Ahlstrand	Tom Dumoulin	Ruben Zepuntke	Simon Yates	Tom Dumoulin	Ryan Anderson	Kiel Reijnen	Orica–GreenEDGE
3	Sep Vanmarcke	Tom Dumoulin	Ramūnas Navardauskas	Simon Yates	Tom Dumoulin	Ryan Anderson	Matteo Dal-Cin	Orica–GreenEDGE
4	Theo Bos	Tom Dumoulin	Ramūnas Navardauskas	Simon Yates	Tom Dumoulin	Ryan Anderson	Janvier Hadi	Garmin–Sharp
5	Daryl Impey	Daryl Impey	Ramūnas Navardauskas	Simon Yates	Tom Dumoulin	Ryan Anderson	Steven Kruijswijk	Garmin–Sharp
Final		Daryl Impey	Ramūnas Navardauskas	Simon Yates	Tom Dumoulin	Ryan Anderson	—	Garmin–Sharp

== Classification standings ==
Legend
Yellow jersey	Denotes the leader of the General classification	Polka dot jersey	Denotes the leader of the Mountains classification
Green jersey	Denotes the leader of the Points classification	White jersey	Denotes the leader of the Young rider classification
Red jersey	Denotes the leader of the Canadian rider classification	Yellow number	Denotes the leader of the Team classification

=== General classification ===
	Rider	Team	Time
1	Daryl Impey (RSA)	Orica–GreenEDGE	16h 07' 56"
2	Tom Dumoulin (NED)	Giant–Shimano	+ 1"
3	Ruben Zepuntke (GER)	Bissell Development Team	+ 9"
4	Ramūnas Navardauskas (LTU)	Garmin–Sharp	+ 10"
5	Ryan Anderson (CAN)	Optum–Kelly Benefit Strategies	+ 11"
6	Serghei Țvetcov (ROM)	Jelly Belly–Maxxis	+ 15"
7	Leigh Howard (AUS)	Orica–GreenEDGE	+ 16"
8	Daniel Summerhill (USA)	UnitedHealthcare	+ 19"
9	Sep Vanmarcke (BEL)	Belkin Pro Cycling	+ 31"
10	James Oram (NZL)	Bissell Development Team	+ 31"

=== Points classification ===
	Rider	Team	Points
1	Ramūnas Navardauskas (LTU)	Garmin–Sharp	47
2	Daryl Impey (RSA)	Orica–GreenEDGE	40
3	Ruben Zepuntke (GER)	Bissell Development Team	29
4	Theo Bos (NED)	Belkin Pro Cycling	27
5	Ryan Anderson (CAN)	Optum–Kelly Benefit Strategies	26
6	Sep Vanmarcke (BEL)	Belkin Pro Cycling	23
7	Jonas Ahlstrand (SWE)	Giant–Shimano	21
8	Daniel Summerhill (USA)	UnitedHealthcare	14
9	Serghei Țvetcov (ROM)	Jelly Belly–Maxxis	11
10	Leigh Howard (AUS)	Orica–GreenEDGE	11

=== Mountains classification ===
	Rider	Team	Points
1	Simon Yates (GBR)	Orica–GreenEDGE	58
2	Robin Carpenter (USA)	Hincapie Sportswear Development Team	42
3	Mathew Hayman (AUS)	Orica–GreenEDGE	22
4	Alessandro Bazzana (ITA)	UnitedHealthcare	20
5	Steven Kruijswijk (NED)	Belkin Pro Cycling	15
6	Michael Woods (CAN)	5-hour Energy	14
7	Toms Skujiņš (LAT)	Hincapie Sportswear Development Team	13
8	Ben King (USA)	Garmin–Sharp	10
9	Simon Geschke (GER)	Giant–Shimano	9
10	Sam Bassetti (USA)	5-hour Energy	9

=== Young rider classification ===
	Rider	Team	Time
1	Tom Dumoulin (NED)	Giant–Shimano	16h 07' 57"
2	Ruben Zepuntke (GER)	Bissell Development Team	+ 8"
3	James Oram (NZL)	Bissell Development Team	+ 30"
4	Daniel Eaton (USA)	Bissell Development Team	+ 46"
5	Nick van der Lijke (NED)	Belkin Pro Cycling	+ 48"
6	Dion Smith (NZL)	Hincapie Sportswear Development Team	+ 48"
7	Davide Formolo (ITA)	Cannondale	+ 52"
8	Simon Yates (GBR)	Orica–GreenEDGE	+ 59"
9	Toms Skujiņš (LAT)	Hincapie Sportswear Development Team	+ 1' 05"
10	Hugo Houle (CAN)	Canada (national team)	+ 1' 36"

=== Team classification ===
	Team	Time
1	Garmin–Sharp	48h 24' 42"
2	Orica–GreenEDGE	+ 10"
3	Bissell Development Team	+ 48"
4	Belkin Pro Cycling	+ 48"
5	UnitedHealthcare	+ 1' 19"
6	Hincapie Sportswear Development Team	+ 1' 22"
7	Cannondale	+ 3' 40"
8	Giant–Shimano	+ 3' 55"
9	Optum–Kelly Benefit Strategies	+ 5' 00"
10	Team SmartStop	+ 9' 35"
