= Team 3C Gruppe =

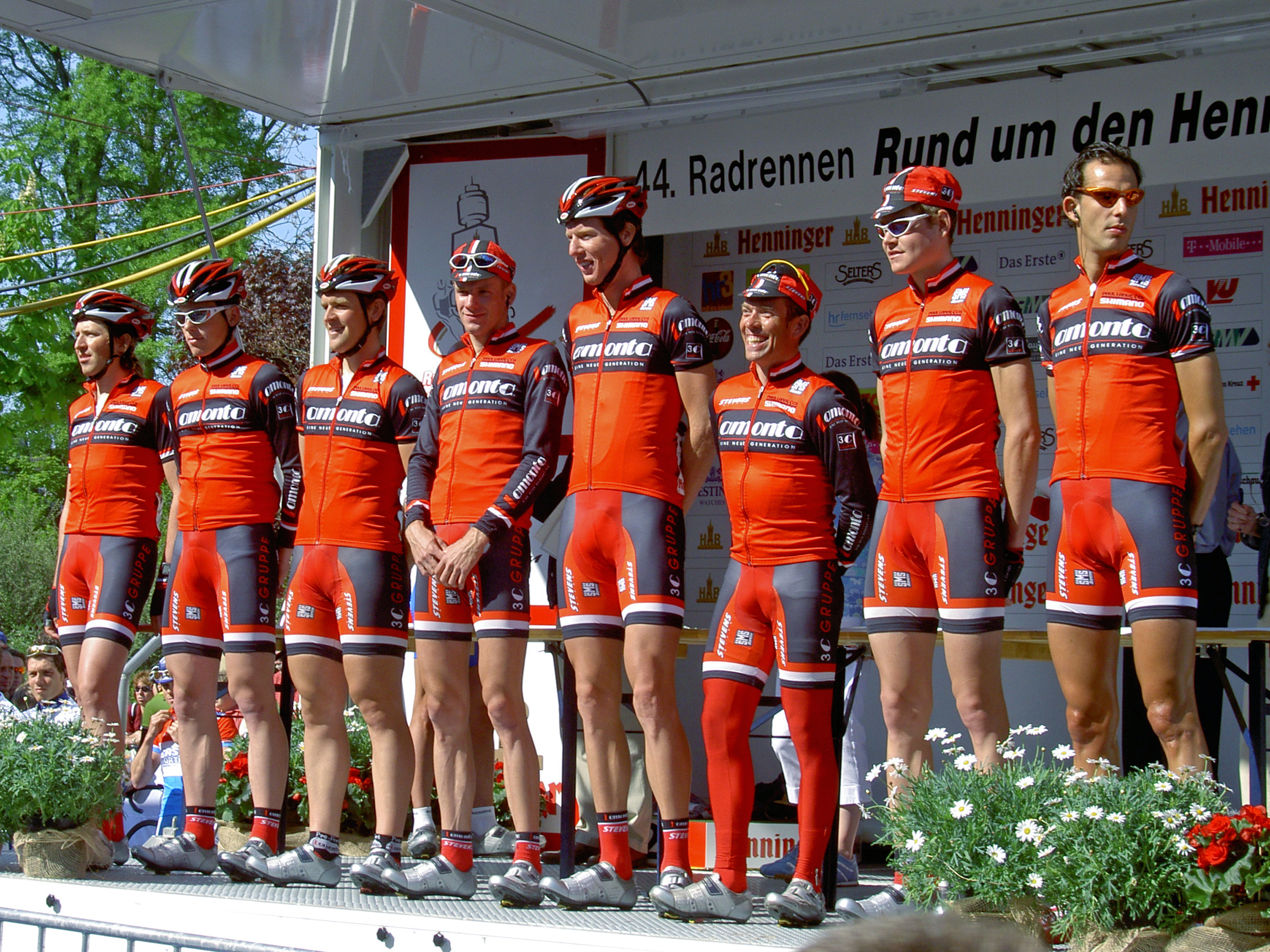
- The team in 2005

Team information
- UCI code: 3CG
- Registered: Germany
- Founded: 2002
- Disbanded: 2008
- Discipline: Road
- Status: Div III (2002); Div II (2003–2004); UCI Continental (2005–2008)
- Bicycles: Look

Key personnel
- General manager: Rafael Hennes
- Team manager: Holger Sievers

Team name history
- 2002–2006 2007 2008: Team Lamonta; Team 3C Gruppe–Lamonta; Team 3C Gruppe

Team 3C Gruppe was a German UCI Continental team that existed from 2002 until 2008.

For the 2003 season the team wanted to show itself in the second division managed to hire many riders from the top tier. In 2007 Dominic Klemme won the German national Under-23 Road race in a seven-man sprint to the line.

== Final roster ==
As of 31 December 2008

Rider	Date of birth
Tobias Erler (GER)	17 May 1979 (aged 29)
Sebastian Forke (GER)	13 March 1987 (aged 21)
Matthias Friedemann (GER)	17 August 1984 (aged 24)
Sergej Fuchs (GER)	21 February 1987 (aged 21)
Dominic Klemme (GER)	31 October 1986 (aged 22)
Christian Leben (GER)	6 April 1985 (aged 23)
René Obst (GER)	21 June 1977 (aged 31)

Rider	Date of birth
Björn Papstein (GER)	5 June 1975 (aged 33)
Dennis Pohl (GER)	11 November 1986 (aged 22)
Sebastian Pristl (GER)	15 September 1987 (aged 21)
Felix Schäfermeister (GER)	13 May 1988 (aged 20)
Frank Scherzinger (GER)	12 April 1986 (aged 22)
Paul Voß (GER)	26 March 1986 (aged 22)

== Major wins ==
2002

No recorded wins

2003
Stage 4 Giro del Capo, Jonas Owczarek
2004
Stage 1 Flèche du Sud, Jonas Owczarek
Stage 2 Giro del Capo, David Kopp
Rund um Düren, David Kopp
Stage 6 Bayern Rundfahrt, Stefan Schumacher
Noord-Nederland Tour, Stefan Kupfernagel
Sparkassen Giro Bochum, David Kopp
Egmont Cycling Race, David Kopp
Druivenkoers Overijse, Stefan Schumacher
Rund um den Sachsenring, Björn Papstein
Stage 5 Rheinland-Pfalz Rundfahrt, Björn Glasner
2005
Ronde van Drenthe, Marcel Sieberg
Stage 3 Niedersachsen Rundfahrt, Björn Papstein
Stage 5 Rheinland-Pfalz Rundfahrt, Christoph van Kleinsorgen
Stage 4 Tour of Qinghai Lake, Stefan Cohnen
2006
Stages 2 & 3 Course de la Paix, Danilo Hondo
Stage 3b Thüringen Rundfahrt der U23, Sören Hofmann
Neuseen Classics, Danilo Hondo
Circuito Montañés

Stage 1, Hannes Blank
Stages 2 & 3, Danilo Hondo

Stage 2 Sachsen Tour, Danilo Hondo
Stage 1 Regio-Tour, Danilo Hondo
Stage 1 Tour de Indonesia, André Schulze
Omloop van de Vlaamse Scheldeboorden, Danilo Hondo
2007
Namibia National Road Race Championships, Erik Hoffmann
Stage 1 Circuito Montañes, Erik Hoffmann
Rund um den Sachsenring, Tobias Erler
Germany National Under-23 Road Race Championships, Dominic Klemme
2008
Vuelta a Cuba

Stage 4, Matthias Friedemann
Stage 10, René Obst

Grand Prix de la Ville de Lillers, Dominic Klemme
Stage 3 Thüringen Rundfahrt der U23, Dominic Klemme
Stage 2 Regio-Tour, Dominic Klemme
Druivenkoers Overijse, Dominic Klemme

== National champions ==
2007
Namibia Road race, Erik Hoffmann
German Road race, Dominic Klemme
