= René Obst =

German cyclist

Personal information
- Born: 21 June 1977 (age 49) Görlitz, East Germany

Cycling career
- Sport: Cycling
- Current team: Retired
- Discipline: Road
- Role: Rider

Professional teams
- 2002: Team Wiesenhof (stagiaire)
- 2003–2005: Team Wiesenhof
- 2006: Continental Team Milram
- 2007–2008: Team 3C Gruppe–Lamonta
- 2009–2010: Team Nutrixxion–Sparkasse
- 2011–2012: Team NSP

René Obst (born 21 June 1977) is a German former professional racing cyclist. He notably won the GP Stad Zottegem in 2006.

== Major results ==
2000
2nd Rund um Berlin
2001
1st Stages 5 & 7 Tour of South China Sea
1st Stage 7 Vuelta a la Independencia Nacional
2002
1st Stages 5 & 6 Tour of South China Sea
1st Stage 3 Tour de Gironde
1st Stage 5 Brandenburg-Rundfahrt
5th Ronde van Overijssel
8th Grand Prix de Beuvry-la-Forêt
2003
1st Stage 3 Brandenburg-Rundfahrt
5th Poreč Trophy 2
2006
1st GP Stad Zottegem
8th Overall OZ Wielerweekend

1st Stage 3

2007
5th Grand Prix Herning
6th Rund um den Sachsenring
7th Rund um Köln
7th GP Aarhus
9th Grote Prijs Jef Scherens
2008
1st Stage 10 Vuelta a Cuba
10th Neuseen Classics
2009
1st Rund um Sebnitz
3rd Rund um den Sachsenring
2010
1st Stage 3 Czech Cycling Tour
