= Wu Kin San =

Hong Kong cyclist (born 1985)

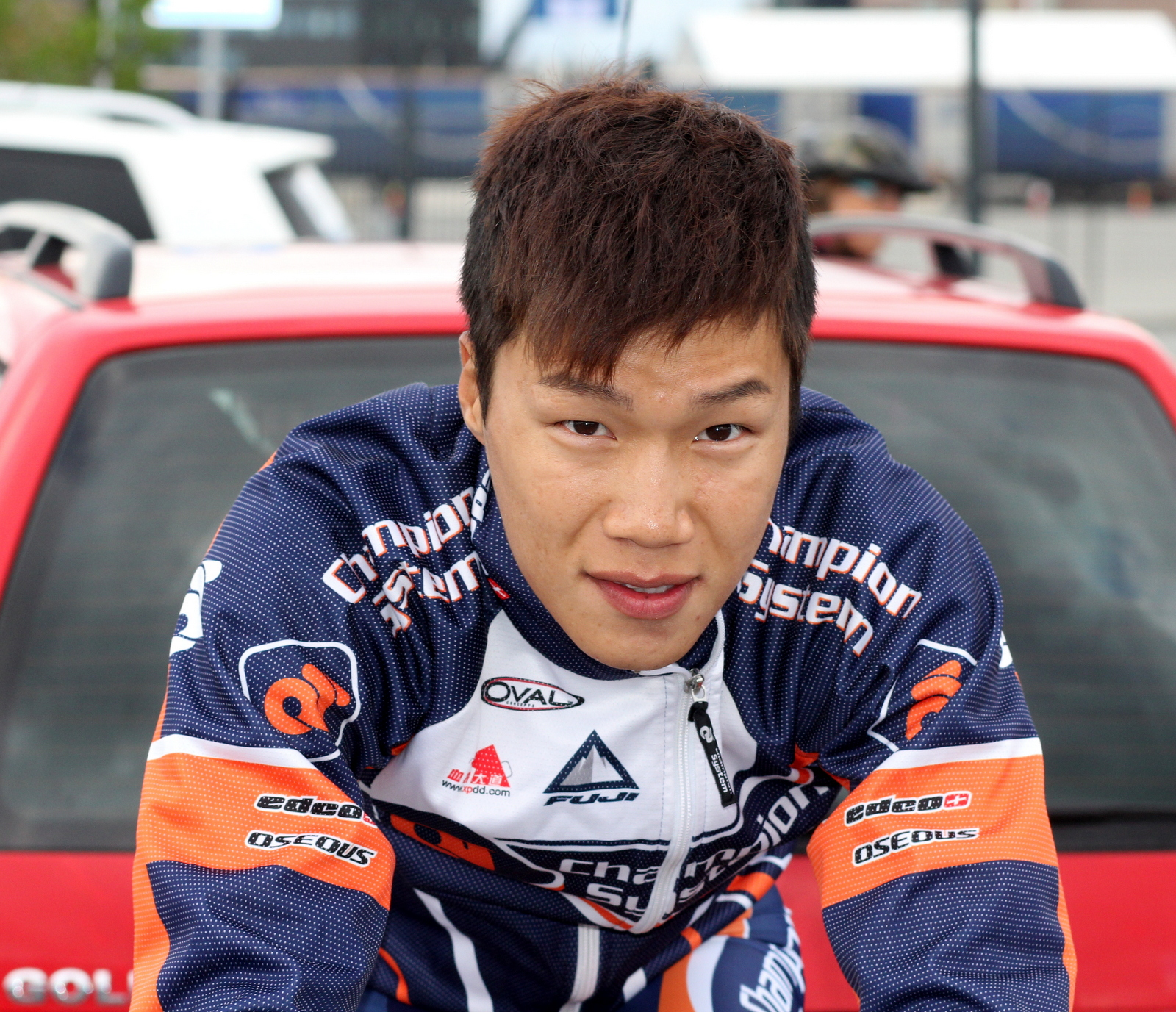
- Wu Kin San at Tour des Fjords 2013

Personal information
- Full name: Wu Kin San
- Born: 4 May 1985 (age 41) Hong Kong, Hong Kong
- Height: 1.75 m (5 ft 9 in)
- Weight: 68 kg (150 lb)

Cycling career
- Sport: Cycling
- Discipline: Road
- Role: Rider

Professional teams
- 2005–2006: Purapharm
- 2007–2011: Hong Kong Pro Cycling Team
- 2011–2013: Champion System

Wu Kin San (Chinese: 胡健燊; pinyin: Wǔ Jiànxīn; Jyutping: wu^{4} gin^{3} san^{1}; born May 4, 1985, in Hong Kong) is a Hong Kong professional road cyclist, who last rode for the Champion System team.

== Professional career ==
Wu began cycling at the age of twelve, and having shown his great talent and passion for sport, turned pro just 8 years later. In 2005, he claimed numerous titles road race at the Tour of South China Sea in Macau and Hong Kong, while playing for Purapharm Cycling Team. A year later, Wu signed a contract with Lampre–Fondital to undergo a training in Milan, Italy. Following his return to Hong Kong, Wu supposedly started his first race for the Tour of Qinghai Lake, but Lampre–Fondital decided to withdraw from the tour. Few months later, his contract with the Italian pro cycling firm ended.

In 2007, Wu started his season with the Hong Kong Pro Cycling Team by winning his first ever national Under-23 championship title in 2 hours, 10 minutes, and 16 seconds. A year later, Wu switched his focus to the 2008 Summer Olympics in Beijing, where he finished the men's road race in 88th place with a time of 7:05:57. Wu also became the first ever cyclist from Hong Kong to successfully complete the Olympic road race.

== Career highlights ==
2005
1st Stage 6 Tour d'Indonesia, Malang (INA)
1st Overall Tour of South China Sea

1st Stages 1, 3 & 8

2006
1st Stage 1 Tour of Siam, Saphan Hin (THA)
2007
1st National Road Race Championships
1st National Under-23 Road Race Championships
2008
3rd Overall Cepa Tour
2009
4th Hong Kong Criterium Series
2010
4th National Road Race Championships
1st Stage 2 Hong Kong Road Race
2nd Hong Kong Criterium Series
10th Tour of South China Sea
2012
4th National Road Race Championships
