= Jonas Ahlstrand =

Swedish cyclist

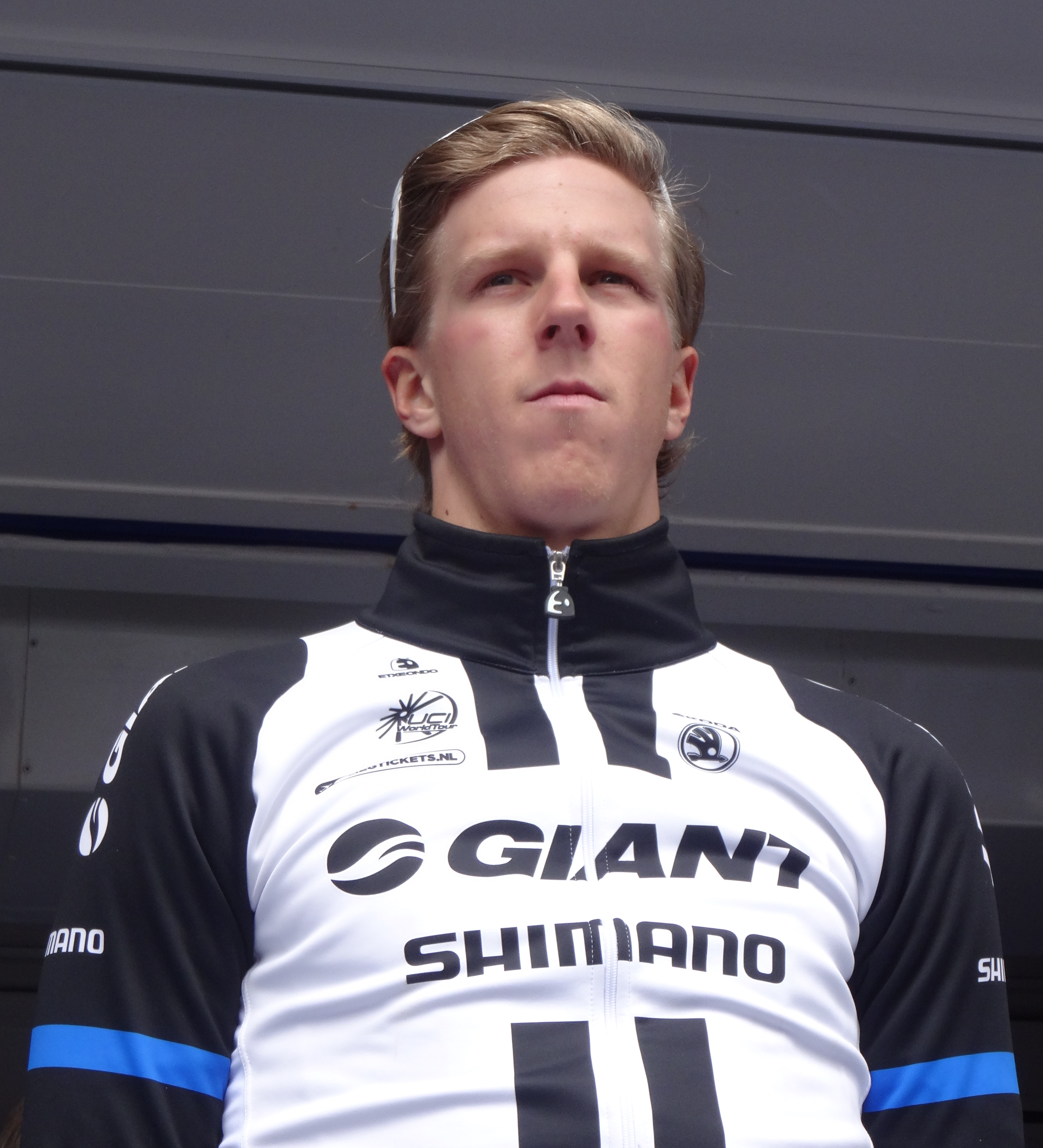
- Ahlstrand at the 2014 Four Days of Dunkirk

Personal information
- Full name: Jonas Ahlstrand
- Born: 16 February 1990 (age 36) Sweden
- Height: 1.77 m (5 ft 10 in)
- Weight: 72 kg (159 lb)

Cycling career
- Sport: Cycling
- Current team: Retired
- Discipline: Road
- Role: Rider
- Rider type: Sprinter

Amateur teams
- 2010–2012: CykelCity.se
- 2017: Ormsalva Athletic Club

Professional teams
- 2013–2014: Argos–Shimano
- 2015–2016: Cofidis

Jonas Ahlstrand (born 16 February 1990) is a Swedish former professional cyclist, who rode professionally between 2013 and 2016 for the Giant–Shimano and Cofidis teams.

Ahlstrand's first professional-level victory came while he was still racing for a UCI Continental team at the 2012 Tour of Norway. He won two professional races for Giant–Shimano, both in 2014, at the Circuit de la Sarthe and the Tour of Alberta. His first victory for Cofidis was at the 2015 Four Days of Dunkirk.

== Major results ==
2007
3rd Time trial, National Junior Road Championships
10th Time trial, UEC European Junior Road Championships
2008
National Junior Road Championships

1st Road race
3rd Time trial

2010
1st Univest Grand Prix
2011
2nd Tallinn–Tartu GP
2nd Kernen Omloop Echt-Susteren
2012
1st Scandinavian Race Uppsala
1st Stage 1 Tour of Norway
3rd La Côte Picarde
7th Ronde Van Vlaanderen Beloften
2014
1st Stage 2 Circuit de la Sarthe
1st Stage 2 Tour of Alberta
2015
1st Stage 2 Four Days of Dunkirk
1st Stage 4 Tour de l'Eurométropole
6th Velothon Stockholm
2017
2nd Kalmar Grand Prix
10th Himmerland Rundt
