= Tang Wang Yip =

Hong Kong cyclist

Personal information
- Born: June 5, 1984 (age 42)

Cycling career
- Sport: Cycling
- Current team: Unattached
- Discipline: Road
- Role: Rider

Amateur team
- 2013: Totalsports Neilpryde Cyclone (from 09/8)

Professional teams
- 2005-2010: Purapharm
- 2011: Champion System
- 2013: Champion System (until 08/8)

Tang Wang Yip or Wang Yip Tang (Simplified Chinese:邓宏业; Traditional Chinese: 鄧宏業) (born June 5, 1984) is a cyclist from Hong Kong.

== Palmares ==
2006
2nd Tour of South China Sea
2007
Hong Kong Time Trial Champion
1st Tour of South China Sea

1st stage 1

2008
1st stage 4 Tour of South China Sea
2009
1st East Asian Games Road Race
3rd East Asian Games Team Time Trial
2010
Hong Kong Road Champion
