= 2007 Grote Prijs Jef Scherens =

Race details
- Dates: 2 September 2007
- Stages: 1
- Distance: 183 km (113.7 mi)
- Winning time: 4h 16' 00"

Results
	Winner	Bram Tankink (NED)
	Second	Janek Tombak (EST)
	Third	Frédéric Amorison (BEL)

The 2007 Grote Prijs Jef Scherens was the 41st edition of the Grote Prijs Jef Scherens cycle race and was held on 2 September 2007. The race started and finished in Leuven. The race was won by Bram Tankink.

== General classification ==
Final general classification

Rank	Rider	Time
1	Bram Tankink (NED)	4h 16' 00"
2	Janek Tombak (EST)	+ 10"
3	Frédéric Amorison (BEL)	+ 10"
4	Matti Helminen (FIN)	+ 10"
5	Sven Renders (BEL)	+ 20"
6	René Jørgensen (DEN)	+ 20"
7	Robert Retschke (GER)	+ 20"
8	Matthé Pronk (NED)	+ 20"
9	René Obst (GER)	+ 27"
10	Sergey Kolesnikov (RUS)	+ 1' 34"
