= Rund um den Sachsenring =

Cycling race in Germany

Race details
- Date: October
- Region: Saxony
- Discipline: Road race
- Competition: UCI Europe Tour
- Type: Single day race

History
- First edition: 2004
- Editions: 12 (as of 2015)
- First winner: Björn Papstein (GER)
- Most wins: Karsten Volkmann (GER) (2 wins)
- Most recent: Erik Mohs (GER)

The Rund um den Sachsenring is a one-day cycling race held annually in Germany. It was part of UCI Europe Tour in category 1.2 from 2005 to 2008.

== Winners ==
Year	Winner	Second	Third
2005	(Germany) Karsten Volkmann	(Germany) Andreas Schillinger	(Germany) Tilo Schüler
2006	(Germany) Artur Gajek	(Germany) Andreas Schillinger	(Germany) Philipp Mamos
2007	(Germany) Tobias Erler	(Germany) Oliver Giesecke	(Germany) Christian Kux
2008	(Germany) Karsten Volkmann	(Germany) Fabian Pohl	(Germany) Christian Leben
2009	(Germany) Dirk Müller	(Germany) Jonas Schmeiser	(Germany) René Obst
2010	(Germany) Markus Schwarzhuber	(Germany) Matthias Friedemann	(Germany) Tobias Erler
2011	(Germany) Johannes Heider	(Germany) Tino Meier	(Czech Republic) Martin Boubal
2012	(Germany) Stefan Gaebel	(Germany) Kersten Thiele	(Germany) Henning Bommel
2013	(Germany) Matthias Plarre	(Germany) Stefan Gaebel	(Germany) Martin Boubal
2014	(Germany) Johannes Heider	(Germany) Mathias Wiele	(Germany) Konrad Geßner
2015	(Germany) Erik Mohs	(Czech Republic) Tomáš Okrouhlický	(Germany) Robert-William Kessler
