= Dominic Klemme =

German cyclist (born 1986)

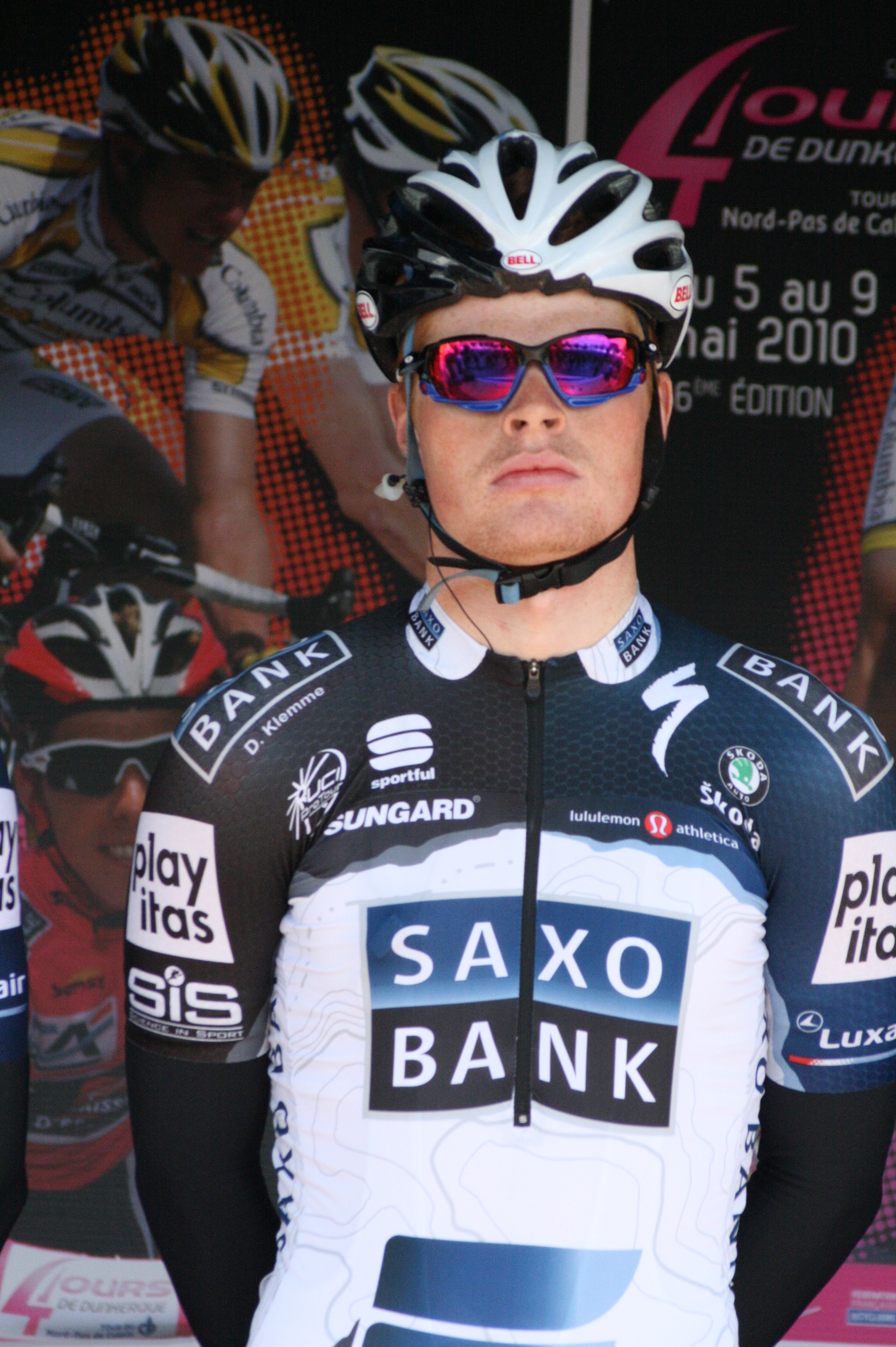
- Klemme at the 2010 Four Days of Dunkirk.

Personal information
- Full name: Dominic Klemme
- Born: 31 October 1986 (age 39) Lemgo, West Germany
- Height: 1.78 m (5 ft 10 in)
- Weight: 74 kg (163 lb)

Cycling career
- Sport: Cycling
- Current team: Retired
- Discipline: Road
- Role: Rider

Professional teams
- 2006: Team Heinz von Heiden
- 2007–2008: Team 3C Gruppe–Lamonta
- 2009–2010: Team Saxo Bank
- 2011: Leopard Trek
- 2012: Project 1t4i
- 2013–2014: IAM Cycling

Major wins
- National Under-23 Road Race Championships (2007)

Dominic Klemme, also shown as Domenek Klemme, (born 31 October 1986) is a German former professional road bicycle racer who last rode for UCI Professional Continental Team IAM Cycling.

As a neo-pro, Klemme has already shown his aggressive style by taking part in as many breakaways as he possibly can taking on the legacy of his fellow countryman, Jens Voigt.

== Career ==
On 3 April 2010, at the Hel van het Mergelland, Klemme won the sprint from the first chase group of 15 with Yann Huguet's Skil–Shimano teammate Simon Geschke holding on to take 4th; Koos Moerenhout of Rabobank filled out the top five. Klemme finished third at 2010 Hel van het Mergelland.

On 27 June 2010, at the German Championships, Tony Martin, the new time trial champion, outsprinted Klemme for fourth place. Klemme tried hard to bridge the gap, but started to have cramps and needed to ease off. Christian Knees was able to move up to the front in this lap, which turned out to be crucial. Three more riders, Markus Fothen, Klemme and Christoph Pfingsten, moved up as well to make it nine on the front. After 150 km, the gap was almost two minutes to the main field. With a little more than 20 km to go, Schillinger and Knees attacked the group, with Radochla also tagging on. Fothen tried in vain to bridge, leaving the three front runners to decide who would get which medal.

Klemme left Argos–Shimano at the end of the 2012 season, and joined the new IAM Cycling team for the 2013 season.

At the end of 2014 Klemme announced his retirement from the sport saying; "After the last three years were very poor resultswise, I've decided to quit professional cycling."

== Palmares ==
2007
1st National Under-23 Road Race Championships
7th World Under-23 Road Race Championships
8th Münsterland Giro
2008
1st GP de Lillers
1st Stage 3 Thüringen Rundfahrt der U23
1st Stage 2 Regio-Tour
1st Druivenkoers Overijse
Tour de l'Avenir

1st Stages 3 & 7

3rd Beverbeek Classic
5th Thüringen Rundfahrt der U23
2010
3rd Hel van het Mergelland
5th National Time Trial Championships
2011
1st Le Samyn

Grand Tour general classification results timeline

Grand Tour	2010	2011	2012	2013	2014
Giro d'Italia	—	DNF	—	—	—
Tour de France	—	—	—	—	—
Vuelta a España	155	—	—	—	—

Legend
—	Did not compete
DNF	Did not finish
