= 2012 Tour of Norway =

Cycling race

2012 Glava Tour of Norway
2012 UCI Europe Tour

Race details
- Dates: 16—20 May 2012
- Stages: 5
- Distance: 897.5 km (557.7 mi)
- Winning time: 21h 11' 40"

Results
Jersey awarded to the overall winner	Winner	Edvald Boasson Hagen (NOR)	(Team Sky)
	Second	Simon Clarke (AUS)	(Orica–GreenEDGE)
	Third	Lars Petter Nordhaug (NOR)	(Team Sky)
Jersey awarded to the mountains classification winner	Mountains	André Cardoso (ESP)	(Caja Rural)
Jersey awarded to the youth classification winner	Youth	Edvald Boasson Hagen (NOR)	(Team Sky)
Jersey awarded to the sprints classification winner	Sprints	Edvald Boasson Hagen (NOR)	(Team Sky)

The 2012 Glava Tour of Norway was the second edition of the Glava Tour of Norway cycle race. It forms part of the 2012 UCI Europe Tour.

It was won by Edvald Boasson Hagen.

== Teams ==
UCI ProTour teams	UCI Europe Tour teams
Orica–GreenEDGE (OGE); Team Sky (SKY); Lampre–ISD (LAM); Lotto–Belisol (LTB); Garmin–Barracuda (GRM); Team Saxo Bank (SAX)	Accent.jobs–Willems Veranda's (ACC); Christina Watches–Onfone (CWO); Caja Rural (CJR); Endura Racing (EDR); RusVelo (RVL); Plussbank BMC (PBC); Team Type 1–Sanofi (TT1); Team Cykelcity (CyC); Topsport Vlaanderen–Mercator (TSV); Team Øster Hus-Ridley (OHR); Joker–Merida (TMB); Velo-Club La Pomme Marseille (LPM); Ringeriks-Kraft Look (KRA)

== Stages ==
Stage	Date	Start	Finish	Km	Winner	Winning team
1	16 May	Sandefjord	Tønsberg	187,5	Jonas Ahlstrand (SWE)	Team Cykelcity
2	17 May	Oslo	Drammen	163	Raymond Kreder (NED)	Garmin–Barracuda
3	18 May	Lillestrøm	Elverum	180	Aidis Kruopis (LTU)	Orica–GreenEDGE
4	19 May	Hamar	Lillehammer	195	Edvald Boasson Hagen (NOR)	Team Sky
5	20 May	Gjøvik	Hønefoss	172	Russell Downing (GBR)	Endura Racing

== Classification Leadership ==
Stage	General Classification	Nordialog super sprint	Samsung King of the Mountains	Skoda young riders classification(U26)
1	Jonas Ahlstrand	Jonas Ahlstrand	Reidar Bohlin Borgersen	Jonas Ahlstrand
2	Alessandro Petacchi	Alessandro Petacchi	Reidar Bohlin Borgersen	Raymond Kreder
3	Jonas Ahlstrand	Alessandro Petacchi	Reidar Bohlin Borgersen	Jonas Ahlstrand
4	Edvald Boasson Hagen	Edvald Boasson Hagen	André Cardoso	Edvald Boasson Hagen
5	Edvald Boasson Hagen	Edvald Boasson Hagen	André Cardoso	Edvald Boasson Hagen
Winner	Edvald Boasson Hagen	Edvald Boasson Hagen	André Cardoso	Edvald Boasson Hagen

== Top ten ==
	Rider	Team	Time
1	Edvald Boasson Hagen (NOR)	Team Sky	21h 11' 40"
2	Simon Clarke (AUS)	Orica–GreenEDGE	+ 8"
3	Lars Petter Nordhaug (NOR)	Team Sky	+ 22"
4	Sander Armée (BEL)	Topsport Vlaanderen–Mercator	+ 30"
5	Sergey Firsanov (RUS)	RusVelo	+ 30"
6	Pieter Serry (BEL)	Topsport Vlaanderen–Mercator	+ 30"
7	Marco Marzano (ITA)	Lampre–ISD	+ 30"
8	Simone Stortoni (ITA)	Lampre–ISD	+ 1'05"
9	Kevyn Ista (BEL)	Accent.jobs–Willems Veranda's	+ 1'49"
10	Pieter Jacobs (BEL)	Topsport Vlaanderen–Mercator	+ 1'49"
