= Ruben Zepuntke =

German cyclist

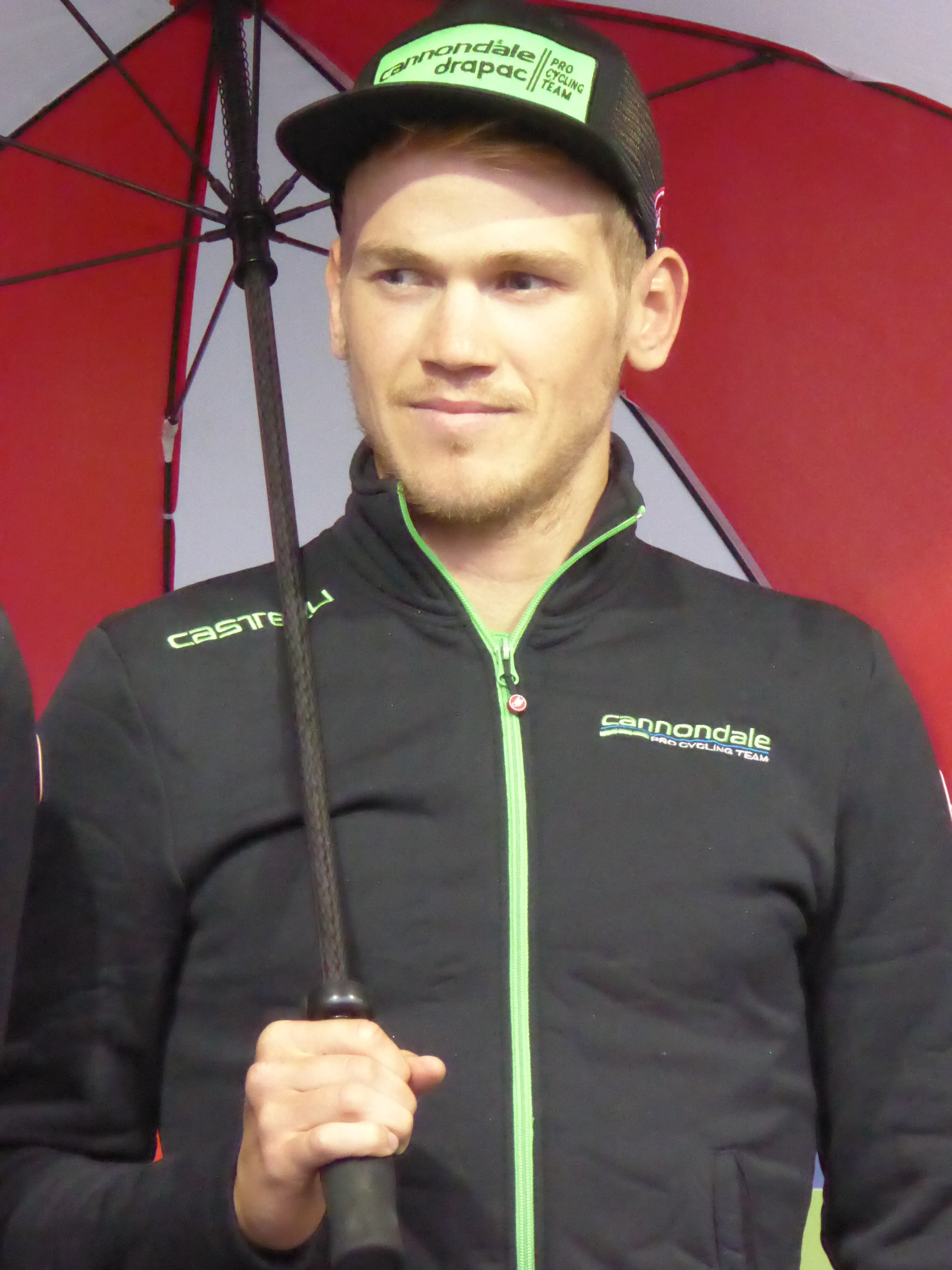
- Zepuntke at the 2016 Tour of Britain

Personal information
- Full name: Ruben Zepuntke
- Born: 29 January 1993 (age 33) Düsseldorf, North Rhine-Westphalia, Germany
- Height: 1.84 m (6 ft 0 in)
- Weight: 76 kg (168 lb)

Cycling career
- Sport: Cycling
- Current team: Retired
- Discipline: Road
- Role: Rider
- Rider type: All-rounder

Amateur team
- 2012–2013: Rabobank Continental Team

Professional teams
- 2014: Bissell Development Team
- 2015–2016: Cannondale–Garmin
- 2017: Development Team Sunweb

Ruben Zepuntke (born 29 January 1993) is a German professional triathlete. Between 2014 and 2017, Zepuntke competed as a professional road racing cyclist, for the Bissell Development Team, Cannondale–Drapac, and Development Team Sunweb.

== Biography ==
Zepuntke was born, raised, and resides in Düsseldorf, North Rhine-Westphalia, Germany. His father, Lutz, is a landscape architect working in local government. His mother, Klaudia, is a community nurse and local Social Democratic politician in Düsseldorf, who was elected to the city council in 2009 and became one of three Honorary Mayors serving under the city's Lord Mayor Thomas Geisel in 2014. He also has a sister, Nora, who works as a teacher in special education.

Zepuntke competed with Rabobank Continental Team, a UCI Continental team, for the 2012 and 2013 seasons. He competed with Bissell Development Team, in 2014.

Zepuntke signed with Cannondale–Garmin, a UCI ProTeam, for the 2015 and 2016 seasons.

== Major results ==
2010
3rd Road race, National Junior Road Championships
6th Overall Regio-Tour Juniors
8th Overall Trofeo Karlsberg
2011
1st Time trial, National Junior Road Championships
2nd Overall Niedersachsen Rundfahrt Juniors
5th Paris–Roubaix Juniors
2012
1st Stage 1 (TTT) Thüringen Rundfahrt der U23
4th Rund um den Finanzplatz Eschborn–Frankfurt U23
7th Paris–Roubaix Espoirs
7th Omloop der Kempen
2013
9th Overall Le Triptyque des Monts et Châteaux
2014
3rd Overall Tour of Alberta

1st Stage 1

2016
1st Stage 1 (TTT) Czech Cycling Tour
