= Ryan Anderson (cyclist) =

Racing cyclist (born 1987)

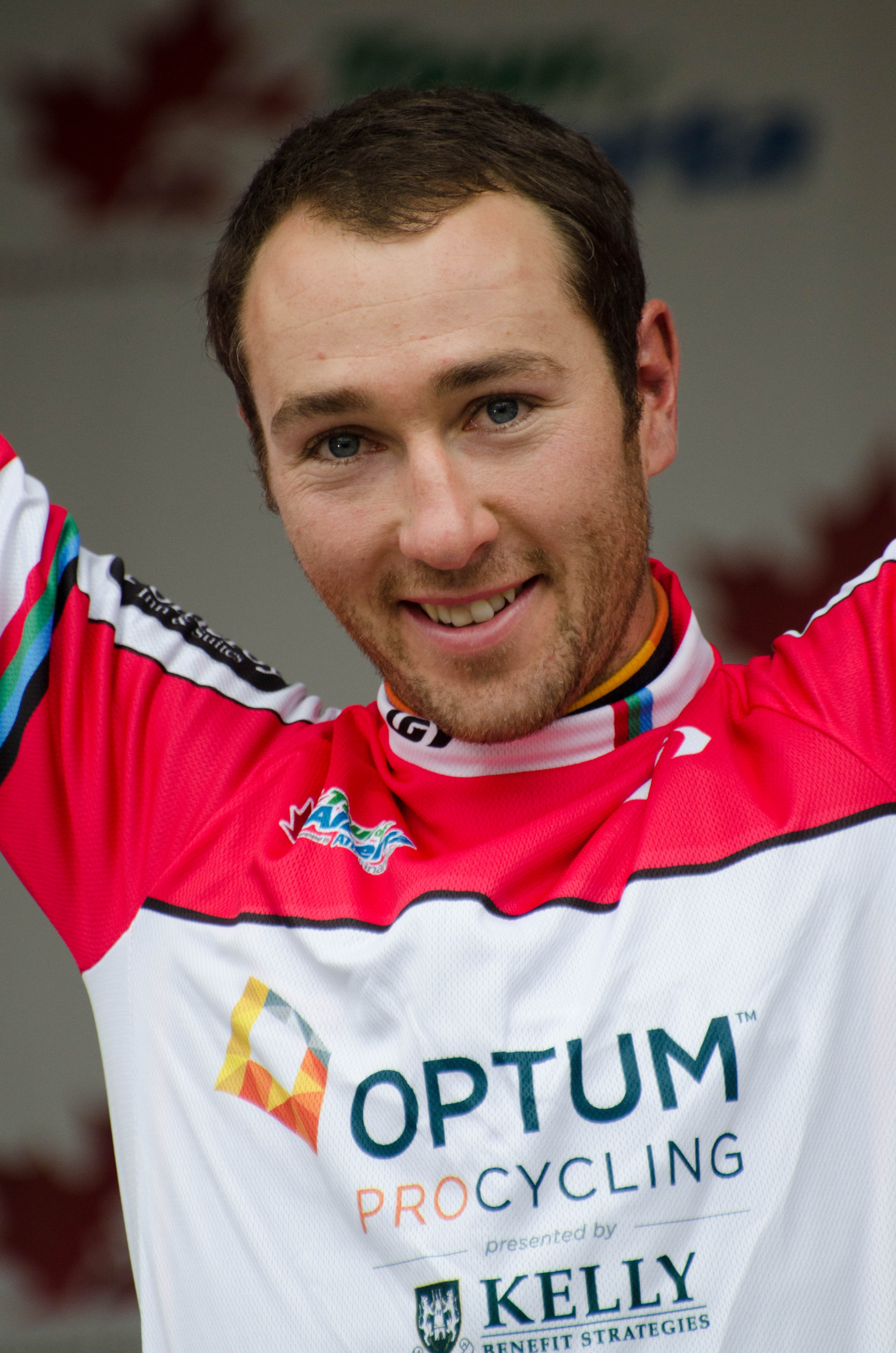
- Ryan Anderson at the 2014 Tour of Alberta

Personal information
- Full name: Ryan Anderson
- Born: July 22, 1987 (age 39) Edmonton, Alberta, Canada
- Height: 1.76 m (5 ft 9 in)
- Weight: 69 kg (152 lb; 10.9 st)

Cycling career
- Sport: Cycling
- Current team: Retired
- Discipline: Road
- Role: Rider
- Rider type: All-rounder

Professional teams
- 2008: Symmetrics
- 2009–2010: Kelly Benefit Strategies
- 2011–2012: SpiderTech–C10
- 2013: Champion System
- 2013–2015: Optum–Kelly Benefit Strategies
- 2016–2017: Direct Énergie
- 2018–2020: Rally Cycling

Ryan Anderson (born July 22, 1987) is a Canadian former professional road racing cyclist, who rode professionally between 2008 and 2020, for the Symmetrics, SpiderTech–C10, Champion System, Direct Énergie, and three stints with the Kelly Benefit Strategies/Rally Cycling teams.

Born in Edmonton, Anderson spent his childhood years in Spruce Grove, Alberta. Anderson currently resides in North Vancouver, British Columbia. He was named in the startlist for the 2016 Vuelta a España.

== Major results ==
2009
2nd Time trial, National Under-23 Road Championships
6th Duo Normand (with David Veilleux)
8th Overall Coupe des nations Ville Saguenay
2010
4th Overall Vuelta del Uruguay
7th Grand Prix des Marbriers
2012
5th Schaal Sels
5th Grand Prix Pino Cerami
2013
2nd Road race, National Road Championships
2nd Overall Tour of Elk Grove
3rd Tour de Delta
8th Overall Tour of Alberta

1st Canadian rider classification

2014
2nd White Spot / Delta Road Race
4th Winston-Salem Cycling Classic
5th Overall Tour of Alberta

1st Canadian rider classification

2015
2nd Road race, National Road Championships
2nd White Spot / Delta Road Race
3rd Overall GP Internacional do Guadiana

1st Points classification
1st Stage 2

2016
2nd Polynormande
5th Grand Prix La Marseillaise
2017
7th White Spot / Delta Road Race

=== Grand Tour general classification results timeline ===
Grand Tour	2016
Giro d'Italia	—
Tour de France	—
Vuelta a España	136

Legend
—	Did not compete
DNF	Did not finish
