= Champion System =

Chinese professional cycling team

Team information
- UCI code: CSS
- Registered: China
- Founded: 2010
- Disbanded: 2013
- Discipline: Road
- Status: UCI Professional Continental
- Bicycles: Fuji
- Website: Team home page

Key personnel
- Team manager: Tim Meeusen

Team name history
- 2010 2011–2013: CKT TMIT-Champion System; Champion System
Champion System jersey
Jersey

Champion System Pro Cycling Team (UCI team code: CSS) was a Chinese professional cycling team, that competed between 2010 and 2013. The team was based in China and it participated in UCI Professional Continental and UCI World Tour races. In an interview in October 2013 the team's general manager Ed Beamon announced that the team would disband at the end of the season due to its main sponsor withdrawing their support.

== Final team roster ==
As of 31 December 2013.

Rider	Date of birth
Ryan Anderson (CAN)	22 July 1987 (aged 26)
Clinton Avery (NZL)	3 December 1987 (aged 26)
Zachary Bell (CAN)	14 November 1982 (aged 31)
Chad Beyer (USA)	15 August 1986 (aged 27)
Matt Brammeier (IRL)	7 June 1985 (aged 28)
Chris Butler (USA)	16 February 1988 (aged 25)
Feng Chun-kai (TPE)	2 November 1988 (aged 25)
Matthias Friedemann (GER)	17 August 1984 (aged 29)
Gregor Gazvoda (SLO)	15 October 1981 (aged 32)
Jang Chan-Jae (KOR)	6 January 1989 (aged 24)
Jiao Pengda (CHN)	13 February 1986 (aged 27)
Jiang Kun (CHN)	23 November 1986 (aged 27)

Rider	Date of birth
Craig Lewis (USA)	1 October 1985 (aged 28)
Liu Biao (CHN)	15 March 1988 (aged 25)
Ryota Nishizono (JPN)	1 September 1987 (aged 26)
Mart Ojavee (EST)	9 November 1981 (aged 32)
Muhamad Othman (MAS)	29 April 1991 (aged 22)
Ryan Roth (CAN)	10 January 1983 (aged 30)
Fabian Schnaidt (GER)	27 October 1990 (aged 23)
Tang Wang Yip (HKG)	5 June 1984 (aged 29)
Bobbie Traksel (NED)	3 November 1981 (aged 32)
Wu Kin San (HKG)	4 May 1985 (aged 28)
Xu Gang (CHN)	28 January 1984 (aged 29)

== Major results ==
2011
Stage 4 Tour de Korea, Jaan Kirsipuu
Jūrmala GP, Jaan Kirsipuu
Estonia Road Race Championships, Mart Ojavee
Stage 4 Tour of Hainan, Deon Locke
2012
Prologue (ITT) Tour of Japan, Will Clarke
Stage 2 Tour de Beauce, Craig Lewis
2013
Stage 4 Tour de Taiwan, Zachary Bell
Stage 6 Tour de Korea, Zachary Bell
Canada Road Race Championships, Zachary Bell
Ireland Road Race Championships, Matt Brammeier
Taiwan Road Race Championships, Feng Chun-kai
Taiwan Time Trial Championships, Feng Chun-kai
