= Egmont Cycling Race =

Belgian cycling race

Race details
- Date: Late August
- Region: East Flanders, Belgium
- English name: Egmont Cycling Race
- Local name: Egmont Cycling Race (in Dutch)
- Nickname: Tistaertprijs
- Discipline: Road race
- Competition: UCI Europe Tour
- Type: Single-day
- Organiser: Zottegemse Wielerclub
- Web site: www.egmontcyclingrace.be

History
- First edition: 1934
- Editions: 87 (as of 2023)
- First winner: André Verlinden (BEL)
- Most wins: Maurice Blomme (BEL) (3 wins)
- Most recent: Jasper De Buyst (BEL)

History (women)
- First winner: Heidi Franz (USA)
- Most wins: (No repeat winners)
- Most recent: Elisa Balsamo (ITA)

Egmont Cycling Race is a single-day road bicycle race held annually in August in Zottegem, Belgium. Since 2005, the race is organized as a 1.1 event on the UCI Europe Tour.

The race started out as 'Dokter Tistaertprijs' in 1934. Between 1971 and 1998 it was called 'Herinneringsprijs Dokter Tistaert – Prijs Groot-Zottegem'. In 1999 it changed to 'G.P. Zottegem – Tistaertprijs'. In 2002 'Tistaertprijs' disappeared in the name. It was called GP Stad Zottegem until 2020. Since 2020 the organization continued under the name 'Egmont Cycling Race'.

A women's edition of the race has been held since 2023, and is rated as a category 1.2 UCI event.

== Winners ==
=== Men ===
Year	Country	Rider	Team
1934	Belgium	André Verlinden	Génial Lucifer–Hutchinson
1935	Belgium	Michel Buyck	Oscar Egg
1936	Belgium	Petrus Van Teemsche	Génial Lucifer–Hutchinson
1937	Belgium	Sylvain Grysolle	Dilecta–Wolber
1938	Belgium	Lode Janssens	individual
1939	Belgium	Marcel Kint	Mercier–Hutchinson
1940	No race		
1941	Belgium	Georges Claes	Dilecta–Wolber
1942	Belgium	Albert Ritserveldt	Dilecta–Wolber
1943	Belgium	Prosper Depredomme	Dilecta–Wolber
1944	No race		
1945	Belgium	Karel De Baere	Mercier–Hutchinson
1946	Belgium	Michel Van Elsué	individual
1947	Belgium	Michel Remue	Groene Leeuw
1948	Belgium	Emile Van der Veken	Starnord–Wolber
1949	Belgium	Maurice Blomme	Bertin–Wolber
1950	Belgium	Maurice Blomme	Bertin–Wolber
1951	Belgium	Maurice Blomme	Bertin–Wolber
1952	Belgium	Leopold Schaeken	Plume Sport
1953	Belgium	Leon Delathouwer	Van Hauwaert
1954	Belgium	Gilbert Desmet	Groene Leeuw–Huret
1955	Belgium	André Auquier	Plume Sport
1956	Belgium	Lucien Mathys	Groene Leeuw
1957	Belgium	Willy Schroeders	Faema–Guerra
1958	Belgium	Roger Baens	Libertas–Dr. Mann
1959	Belgium	Arthur Decabooter	Groene Leeuw–Sinalco
1960	Belgium	Jozef Schils	Mercier–BP–Hutchinson
1961	Belgium	Frans Schoubben	Peugeot–BP–Dunlop
1962	Belgium	Jozef Schils	Mercier–BP–Hutchinson
1963	Belgium	Jean-Baptist Claes	Wiel's–Groene Leeuw
1964	Belgium	Clément Roman	Flandria–Romeo
1965	Belgium	Frans Aerenhouts	Mercier–BP–Hutchinson
1966	Netherlands	Jo de Roo	Televizier–Batavus
1967	Belgium	Roland van de Rijse	Romeo–Smith's
1968	Belgium	Frans Melckenbeeck	Pull Over Centrale–Tasmanie
1969	Belgium	Willy Van den Eynde	Okay Whisky–Diamant
1970	Belgium	Fernand Hermie	Faemino–Faema
1971	Belgium	Albert Van Vlierberghe	Ferretti
1972	Belgium	Herman Van Springel	Molteni
1973	Belgium	Maurice Dury	Flandria–Carpenter
1974	Belgium	André Dierickx	Merlin Plage–Flandria
1975	Netherlands	Jan Raas	TI–Raleigh
1976	Belgium	Willem Peeters	IJsboerke–Colnago
1977	Belgium	Herman Vrijders	Maes Pils–Mini Flat
1978	Belgium	Daniel Willems	IJsboerke–Gios
1979	Belgium	Pol Verschuere	Flandria–Ca-Va Seul–Sunair
1980	Belgium	Etienne Van der Helst	Safir–Ludo
1981	Belgium	Gery Verlinden	Boule d'Or–Sunair
1982	Belgium	Rudy Colman	Splendor–Wickes Bouwmarkt
1983	Italy	Mario Mariotti	De Bilde–Libertas–Smet
1984	Belgium	Luc Colijn	Safir–Van de Ven
1985	Belgium	Raoul Bruyndonckx	Euro Soap–Crack Meubelen
1986	Belgium	Patrick Cocquyt	Hitachi–Marc–Splendor
1987	Netherlands	Nico Verhoeven	Superconfex–Kwantum–Yoko–Colnago
1988	Belgium	Chris Scharmin	ADR–Anti-M–IOC–Merckx
1989	Belgium	Gino Van Hooydonck	Superconfex–Yoko–Opel–Colnago
1990	Netherlands	Marco Van der Hulst	Buckler–Colnago–Decca
1991	Belgium	Peter De Clercq	Lotto
1992	Belgium	Marc Dierickx	Assur Carpets-Naessens
1993	Belgium	Pierre Herinne	Lotto
1994	Belgium	Marc Wauters	WordPerfect–Colnago–Decca
1995	Belgium	Hendrik Redant	TVM-Polis Direct
1996	Belgium	Chris Peers	Collstrop–Lystex
1997	Denmark	Frank Høj	Collstrop–Zeno Project
1998	Belgium	Paul Van Hyfte	Lotto–Mobistar
1999	Belgium	Etienne De Wilde	Spar
2000	Belgium	Michel Vanhaecke	Tönissteiner–Colnago
2001	Belgium	Jo Planckaert	Cofidis
2002	Netherlands	Matthé Pronk	Rabobank
2003	Belgium	Geert Omloop	Palmans–Collstrop
2004	Germany	David Kopp	Team Lamonta
2005	Netherlands	Thomas Dekker	Rabobank
2006	Germany	René Obst	Team Milram
2007	Denmark	Jonas Aaen Jørgensen	Team GLS
2008	Belgium	Roy Sentjens	Silence–Lotto
2009	Belgium	Nico Eeckhout	An Post–M.Donnelly–Grant Thornton–Sean Kelly
2010	Netherlands	Stefan van Dijk	Verandas Willems
2011	Canada	Svein Tuft	SpiderTech–C10
2012	Austria	Matthias Brändle	Team NetApp
2013	Slovenia	Blaž Jarc	NetApp–Endura
2014	Belgium	Edward Theuns	Topsport Vlaanderen–Baloise
2015	Belgium	Kenny Dehaes	Lotto–Soudal
2016	Belgium	Tim Merlier	Crelan–Vastgoedservice
2017	Belgium	Jasper De Buyst	Lotto–Soudal
2018	Belgium	Jérôme Baugnies	Wanty–Groupe Gobert
2019	Netherlands	Piotr Havik	Canyon dhb p/b Bloor Homes
2020	No race due to COVID-19 pandemic in Belgium		
2021	Netherlands	Danny Van Poppel	Intermarché–Wanty–Gobert Matériaux
2022	Belgium	Arnaud De Lie	Lotto–Soudal
2023	Belgium	Jasper De Buyst	Lotto–Dstny

=== Women ===
Year	Country	Rider	Team
2023	United States	Heidi Franz	DNA Pro Cycling
2024	Netherlands	Lieke Nooijen	Visma–Lease a Bike
2025	Italy	Martina Alzini	Cofidis
2026	Italy	Elisa Balsamo	Lidl–Trek
