= Erik Hoffmann =

Namibian cyclist (born 1981)

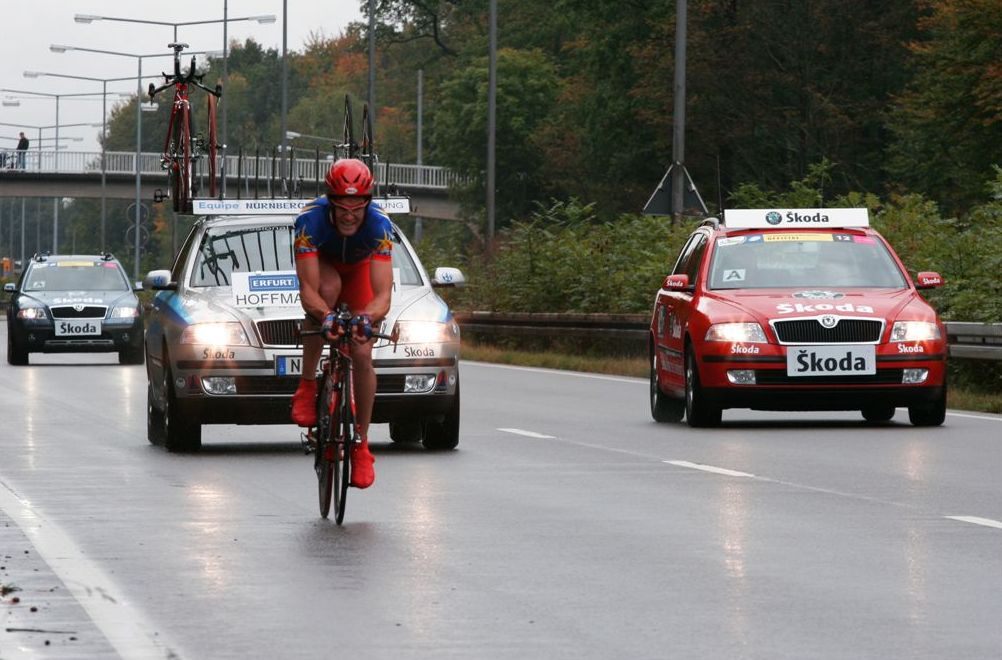

Personal information
- Full name: Erik Hoffmann
- Born: 22 August 1981 (age 45) Windhoek, Namibia

Cycling career
- Sport: Cycling
- Discipline: Road
- Role: Rider

Professional teams
- 2006–2007: 3C-Gruppe Lamonta
- 2008: Giant Asia Racing Team

Erik Hoffmann (born 22 August 1981) is a Namibian professional road bicycle racer. He was born in Windhoek. He moved to University of Stuttgart, Germany in 2001 to study electrical engineering. During 2002 - 2004, he was part of Team Stuttgardia Stuttgart and ever since has been active in professional bicycle racing.

== Palmarès ==
2003
Silver All African Games, Road, Abuja, Nigeria
2004
1st, Nedbank Cycle Classic (NAM)
2005
3rd, Overall, Stuttgart-Strassburg
2006
1st, Günzach Allgäu
1st, Donnersbergkreis
1st, GP Baden-Baden
1st, Ludwigsburg-Eglosheim
2007
Gold National Road Championships
Circuito Montañés

1st, Stage 1, El Astillero
3rd, Stage 6, Santo Toribio

Silver, B World Championships, Cape Town
2008
2nd, Stage 3, Tour de Taiwan, Baguashan
Tour of East Java

3rd, Stage 3, Batu
2nd, Stage 5, Surabaya

1st, Backnang-Waldrems
2nd, Overall, Tour de Korea

2nd, Stage 1, Yamaga circuit
3rd, Stage 8, Yangyang

21st Olympic Games Beijing
2009
Bronze, African Championships, Road Race, Namibia
Bronze, African Championships, Individual Time Trial, Namibia
