= Matthias Friedemann =

German cyclist

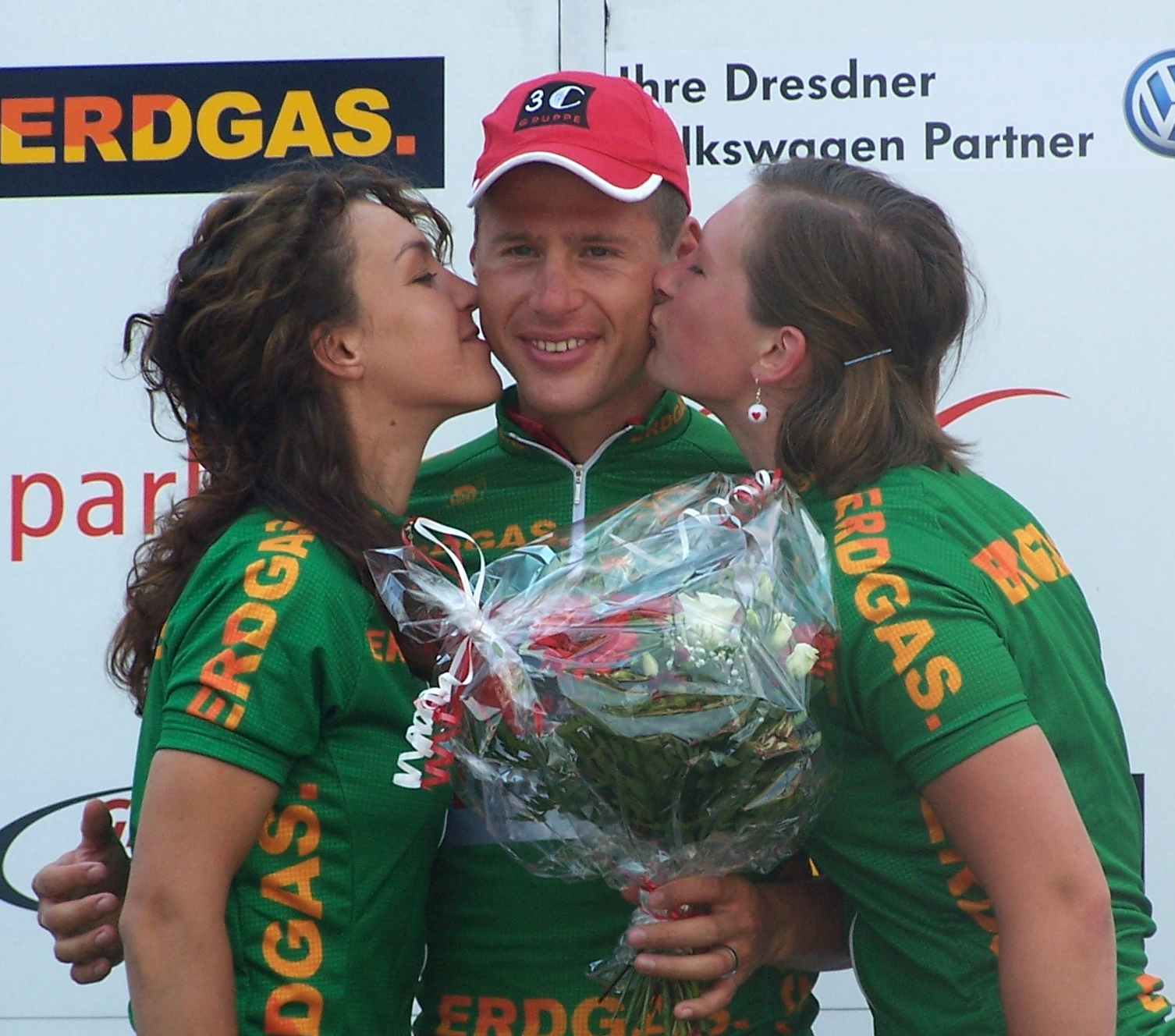

Personal information
- Born: 17 August 1984 (age 42) Rochlitz, Germany

Cycling career
- Sport: Cycling
- Current team: Great-Köstrizer-Giant
- Discipline: Road
- Role: Rider

Amateur teams
- 2004: VC Frankfurt
- 2014-: Great-Köstrizer-Giant

Professional teams
- 2005-2008: Team Lamonta
- 2009: PSK Whirlpool-Author
- 2011-2013: Champion System

Matthias Friedemann (born 17 August 1984 in Rochlitz) is a German cyclist.

== Palmares ==
2007
2nd Grote Prijs Stad Zottegem
2008
1st stage 4 Vuelta a Cuba
3rd Grand Prix de la Ville de Lillers
2009
1st stage 1 Course de la Solidarité Olympique
