= Robert Sweeting (cyclist) =

American cyclist

Personal information
- Born: June 5, 1987 (age 39) United States

Cycling career
- Sport: Cycling
- Current team: Retired
- Discipline: Road
- Role: Rider

Professional teams
- 2007–2008: Toshiba–Santo–Herbalife
- 2009: Land Rover–Orbea
- 2011–2014: Kenda–5-hour Energy
- 2015: Team SmartStop

Robert Sweeting (born June 5, 1987) is an American former cyclist.

== Major results ==
2011
2nd Overall Tour of Elk Grove

1st Stage 2

2013
6th Overall Tour of Alberta
9th Overall Tour of Taihu Lake
2015
1st Stage 8 Vuelta a la Independencia Nacional
