= Tour of South China Sea =

Race details
- Date: December
- Region: Guangdong–Hong Kong–Macau
- Local name(s): 环南中国海自行车赛 (in Chinese)
- Discipline: Road race
- Competition: UCI Asia Tour 1.2
- Type: Classic one-day race
- Web site: www.tourscs.com/en/

History
- First edition: 1996
- Editions: 14 (as of 2010)
- First winner: Wong Kam-po (HKG)
- Most wins: Wong Kam-po (HKG) (4 wins)
- Most recent: Kazuhiro Mori (JPN)

The Tour of South China Sea is an annual professional road bicycle racing classic one-day race held in Guangdong, Hong Kong and Macau since 1996 as part of the UCI Asia Tour. It has been held during Christmas holiday every year since 1996 to celebrate the handover of Hong Kong and Macau to China. The race was won four times by Wong Kam-po. The race is currently rated by the International Cycling Union (UCI) as a 1.2 category race.

== Past winners ==
=== General classification ===
Year	Country	Rider	Team
1996	Hong Kong	Wong Kam-po	
1997	Hong Kong	Wong Kam-po	
1998	South Africa	Kosie Loubser	
1999	Hong Kong	Wong Kam-po	
2000	South Africa	Neil McDonald	HSBC
2001	Hong Kong	Wong Kam-po	Pocari Hong Kong Team
2002	South Africa	Nicholas White	HSBC
2003	Russia	Oleg Grishkine	Moscow City Sports
2004	Russia	Alexander Khatuntsev	Moscow City Sports
2005	Hong Kong	Wu Kin San	Purapharm
2006	Russia	Alexander Khatuntsev	Omnibike Dynamo Moscow
2007	Hong Kong	Tang Wang Yip	Hong Kong Pro Cycling
2008	China	Xu Gang	Hong Kong HSS Shanghai Sports Institute
2009	No race		
2010	Japan	Kazuhiro Mori	Aisan Racing Team
2011–2012	No race		
