= 5-Hour Energy (cycling team) =

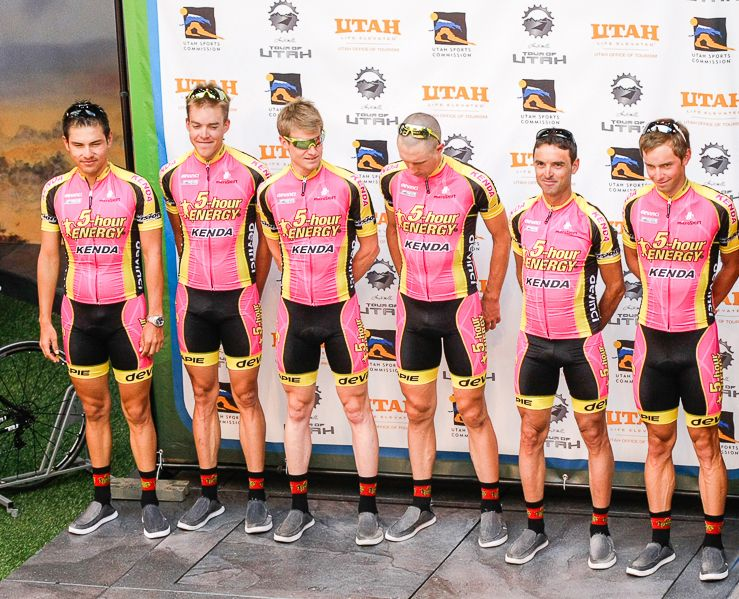
- The team at the 2013 Tour of Utah

Team information
- UCI code: 5HR
- Registered: United States
- Founded: 2009
- Disbanded: 2014
- Discipline: Road
- Status: UCI Continental
- Website: Team home page

Key personnel
- General manager: Jason Kriel

Team name history
- 2009 2010 2011-2012 2013 2014: Kenda-Spinergy; Kenda-Gear Grinder; Kenda-5 Hour Energy; 5 Hour Energy; 5-Hour Energy

5-Hour Energy was a UCI Continental cycling team founded in 2009 in the United States.

After the loss of their title sponsor in December 2014, the team disbanded.

== Final roster ==
As of December 31, 2014.

Rider	Date of birth
Sam Bassetti (USA)	April 2, 1991 (aged 23)
Chad Beyer (USA)	August 15, 1989 (aged 25)
Jonathan Hornbeck (USA)	October 30, 1989 (aged 25)
Jake Keough (USA)	June 18, 1987 (aged 27)
Bruno Langlois (CAN)	March 1, 1979 (aged 35)
Gavin Mannion (USA)	August 24, 1991 (aged 23)

Rider	Date of birth
Christian Parrett (USA)	December 22, 1989 (aged 25)
Taylor Sheldon (USA)	March 31, 1987 (aged 27)
James Stemper (USA)	August 21, 1985 (aged 29)
Robert Sweeting (USA)	June 5, 1987 (aged 27)
David Williams (USA)	June 19, 1988 (aged 26)

== Major wins ==
2011
Stage 2 Tour of Elk Grove, Robert Sweeting
2013
Stage 5 Tour of the Gila, Francisco Mancebo
Stage 3 Tour de Beauce, Francisco Mancebo
Stage 6 The Larry H. Miller Tour of Utah, Francisco Mancebo
