= 2011 Leopard Trek season =

2011 Leopard Trek season
Manager	Brian Nygaard (Note: Nygaard left the team on September 7 following the announcement of the merger with Team RadioShack)
One-day victories	4
Stage race overall victories	2
Stage race stage victories	16
Next season

The 2011 season for Leopard Trek /ˈleɪoʊpɑːrd trɛk/, its first, began in January at the Tour Down Under and ended in October at the Giro di Lombardia. As a UCI ProTeam, they were automatically invited and obligated to send a squad to every race in the UCI World Tour. The team formed for 2011 as a Luxembourgish national project and boasts that nation's two premier riders, Andy and Fränk Schleck. Several riders from the Schleck brothers' former Team Saxo Bank joined the new team.

The team was built for strong showings in the classic cycle races, and includes the best classics rider from the 2010 season, world time trial champion Fabian Cancellara. Though Cancellara did not win any race that awarded points to the UCI World Tour, he consistently placed highly enough that he was briefly the world number one rider in the midst of the classics season. Thanks to Cancellara's performances and the Schleck brothers both finishing on the podium at Liège–Bastogne–Liège, the team was also in the top spot for a time.

Team member Wouter Weylandt died after crashing during stage 3 of the Giro d'Italia, leading to the team's mass withdrawal the next day. Though he won a stage with a long solo breakaway in the mountains, and wore the race leader's yellow jersey for a day, Andy Schleck was runner-up at the Tour de France for the third consecutive year. (Note: Andy Schleck was later elevated to the position of winner in the 2010 Tour de France, though at the time of the 2011 race this had not yet happened) Brother Fränk joined him on the podium in third place.

The team won its final race under the Leopard name, with Oliver Zaugg finishing first at the Giro di Lombardia. For 2012, the team was set to merge with the American Team RadioShack, under the new name RadioShack–Nissan. Though most of that team's management and sponsors were to come on board, the resultant squad continued to be based in Luxembourg under the same license, meaning it is a continuation of this franchise and not the American one.

== 2011 roster ==
Ages as of January 1, 2011.

Rider	Date of birth
Daniele Bennati (ITA)	September 24, 1980 (aged 30)
Fabian Cancellara (SUI)	March 18, 1981 (aged 29)
Will Clarke (AUS)	April 11, 1985 (aged 25)
Stefan Denifl (AUT)	September 22, 1987 (aged 23)
Brice Feillu (FRA)	July 26, 1985 (aged 25)
Jakob Fuglsang (DEN)	March 22, 1985 (aged 25)
Linus Gerdemann (GER)	September 16, 1982 (aged 28)
Dominic Klemme (GER)	October 31, 1986 (aged 24)
Anders Lund (DEN)	February 14, 1985 (aged 25)
Maxime Monfort (BEL)	January 14, 1983 (aged 27)
Martin Mortensen (DEN)	November 5, 1984 (aged 26)
Giacomo Nizzolo (ITA)	January 30, 1989 (aged 21)
Stuart O'Grady (AUS)	August 6, 1973 (aged 37)

Rider	Date of birth
Martin Pedersen (DEN)	April 15, 1983 (aged 27)
Joost Posthuma (NED)	March 8, 1981 (aged 29)
Thomas Rohregger (Note: Rohregger joined the team on February 23) (AUT)	December 23, 1982 (aged 28)
Andy Schleck (LUX)	June 10, 1985 (aged 25)
Fränk Schleck (LUX)	April 15, 1980 (aged 30)
Rüdiger Selig (Note: Selig joined the team on August 1 as a stagiaire.) (GER)	February 19, 1989 (aged 21)
Tom Stamsnijder (NED)	May 15, 1985 (aged 25)
Bruno Pires (POR)	May 15, 1981 (aged 29)
Davide Viganò (ITA)	June 12, 1984 (aged 26)
Jens Voigt (GER)	September 17, 1971 (aged 39)
Robert Wagner (GER)	April 17, 1983 (aged 27)
Fabian Wegmann (GER)	June 20, 1980 (aged 30)
Wouter Weylandt (Note: Weylandt died on May 9 as a result of a crash during the Giro d'Italia) (BEL)	September 27, 1984 (aged 26)
Oliver Zaugg (SUI)	May 9, 1981 (aged 29)

=== Riders' 2010 teams ===
Rider	2010 team
Daniele Bennati	Liquigas–Doimo
Fabian Cancellara	Team Saxo Bank
Will Clarke	stagiaire (Ag2r–La Mondiale)
Stefan Denifl	Cervélo TestTeam
Brice Feillu	Vacansoleil
Jakob Fuglsang	Team Saxo Bank
Linus Gerdemann	Team Milram
Dominic Klemme	Team Saxo Bank
Anders Lund	Team Saxo Bank
Maxime Monfort	Team HTC–Columbia
Martin Mortensen	Vacansoleil
Giacomo Nizzolo	neo-pro
Stuart O'Grady	Team Saxo Bank

Rider	2010 team
Martin Pedersen	Footon–Servetto–Fuji
Joost Posthuma	Rabobank
Thomas Rohregger	Team Milram
Andy Schleck	Team Saxo Bank
Fränk Schleck	Team Saxo Bank
Tom Stamsnijder	Rabobank
Bruno Pires	neo-pro
Davide Viganò	Team Sky
Jens Voigt	Team Saxo Bank
Robert Wagner	Skil–Shimano
Fabian Wegmann	Team Milram
Wouter Weylandt	Quick-Step
Oliver Zaugg	Liquigas–Doimo

== Genesis of the new team ==
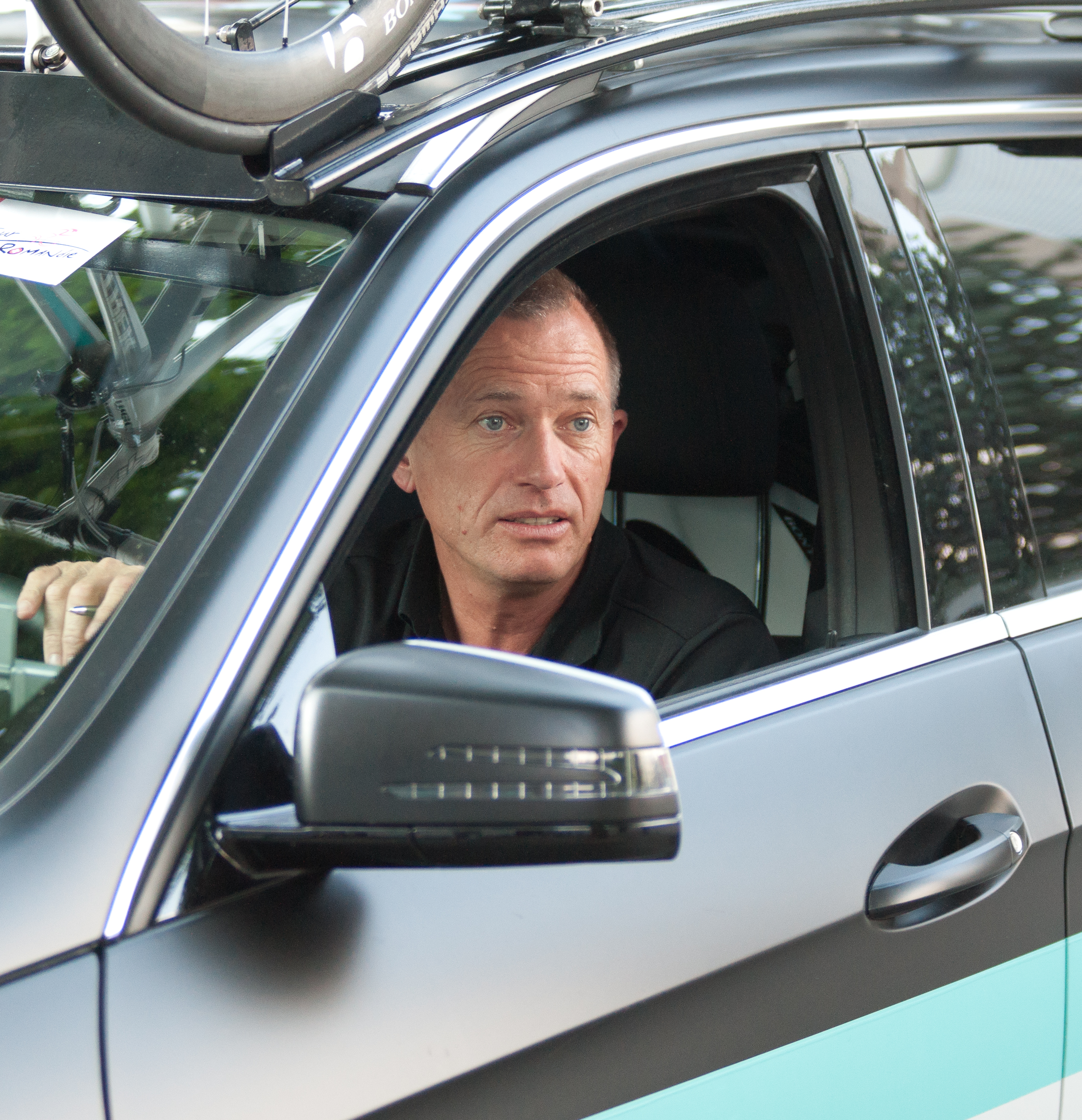
Kim Andersen, formerly a sporting director for Team Saxo Bank, was one of the driving forces behind Leopard Trek's formation and held that same position with them in 2011.

It was first reported shortly after the conclusion of the 2010 Tour de France that Andy and Fränk Schleck would leave Team Saxo Bank, the team for which they had each ridden for the entirety of their respective careers, at the conclusion of that season. It was soon revealed that they would spearhead a new team, one based in their native Luxembourg, led by former Team Saxo Bank staff Kim Andersen and Brian Nygaard. Luxembourg real estate tycoon Flavio Becca was eventually revealed as the team's owner. Andersen and Nygaard sought him out in May 2010 for advice. Becca, a sports fan, had plans to form a new cycling team himself, and he offered Nygaard the position of general manager for his team, essentially combining their ambitions. Becca also brought Andersen on, giving the Dane a position as a sporting director. Fränk Schleck later revealed that he and his brother had had little to do with the formation of the team, being approached with the prospect of joining at the 2010 Tour of Luxembourg in June. Despite a good relationship with Team Saxo Bank manager Bjarne Riis, the brothers felt the opportunity to ride for a "home-based team" was too good to pass up. Andersen made similar comments, saying that the team would have gone forward even if the Schleck brothers rode elsewhere in 2011.

A solid portion of the team's ridership came from Team Saxo Bank just as the Schlecks had, as eight of the eleven riders to depart Team Saxo Bank in the 2010 offseason did so for this team. The most prominent of these was four-time world time trial champion Fabian Cancellara, who was under contract to Team Saxo Bank for 2011 and had to buy his way out of it. After doing so, the Swiss rider signed with the team for three years. The team had hired a roster of 25 riders at the time of their presentation, with Thomas Rohregger joining in late February.

No title sponsor was announced for the team in 2010, as it went about signing riders for its inaugural season. It was known simply as the "Luxembourg Pro Cycling Project" for the first several months of its existence. Even as the end of 2010 neared, Nygaard steadfastly refused to reveal the team's official name, opting to hold off on doing so until the team's official presentation on January 6, 2011. Team member Jakob Fuglsang perhaps inadvertently revealed part of the name in an interview about three weeks before the team's presentation, saying the team would be called "Team Leopard" and that Leopard would be the name in the center of the jersey. Trek, which signed on as a bike supplier in September, was revealed as a title sponsor at the team's presentation, officially making the team's name Leopard Trek. The Leopard name has no particular meaning; it reflects Becca's holding company and is simply an animal he likes. The team presentation itself was something of a spectacle, featuring gymnasts, race videos, and presentations for each rider in front of an audience of 4,000 people, culminating in Nygaard and all riders appearing on stage wearing suit jackets and black scarves as they posed for photos. Shortly after the team's presentation, Trek sent out a primer to cycling media detailing their preferences that the team not be referred to with the prefix "Team" as some other teams are and that there be no hyphen between the sponsors' names. They also specified a preferred verbal pronunciation and that when referred to in print, the team's name should appear in all capital letters. This last request was not widely adhered to.

When the UCI released its list of teams graded according to their hierarchy that decided who would receive a World Tour license, this team's signees put them at the top, making them world number one before they even existed. This did not guarantee the team a top-level license, it simply qualified them for it, but they were later announced as having received a four-year World Tour license. Whether intentionally or incidentally, this corresponded to the initial financial guarantee Becca put up for the team. Nygaard hailed the license acquisition as the fruition of many months of hard work. This afforded the team automatic invitations to all World Tour events, including the season's three Grand Tours.

== One-day races ==
=== Spring classics ===
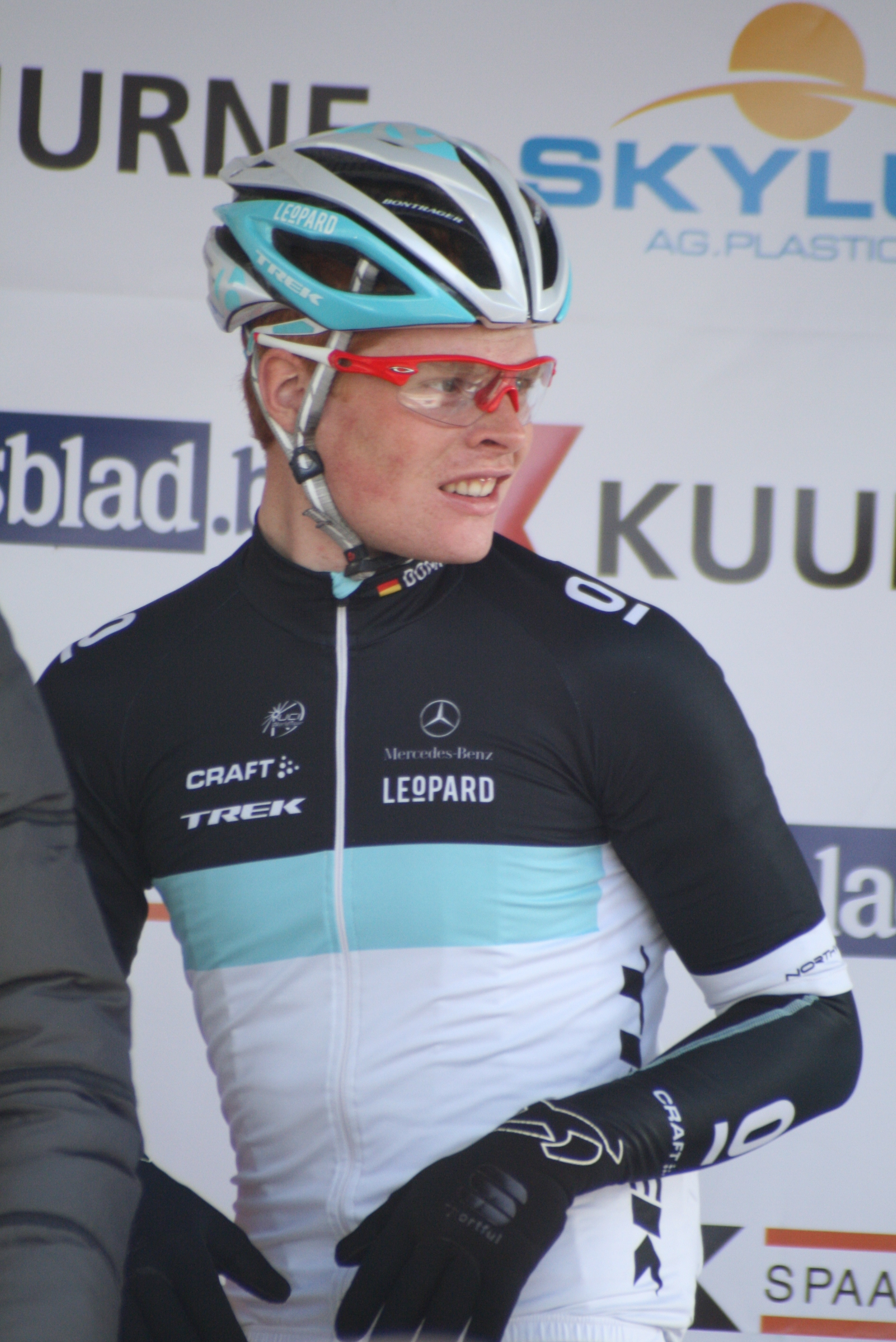
Dominic Klemme, pictured here prior to Kuurne–Brussels–Kuurne, was the first rider to win a race in the team's history.

Klemme got the team's first-ever win early in the spring season, at Le Samyn. After a solo escapee was caught by an elite 12-rider group that came clear of the peloton, Klemme timed his attack on the day's final climb with precision and stayed out front for victory by eight seconds over Kevyn Ista. The team came to the first monument race of the season, Milan–San Remo, with high ambitions. Cancellara aimed for a second triumph in the race, having previously won the 2008 edition, but he recognized that slipping away unmarked in the race's final kilometers as he did three years prior would be difficult to do again. He considered Philippe Gilbert to be his principal rival for the race. Cancellara and O'Grady made the day's major selection on the Le Manie climb, after a crash 90 km (56 mi) from the finish. O'Grady hit out on the attack a few times shortly before the end of the race, but it was Cancellara who was present in an eight-rider group that formed on the Poggio which decided the race. These eight riders represented eight different teams, so no one was able to get a proper leadout. After Gilbert, Vincenzo Nibali, and Yoann Offredo opened up the sprint, Cancellara tried to come around them for the win, but was beaten at the line by HTC–Highroad's Matthew Goss. Cancellara was deeply disappointed to finish second, feeling that even though he had done one of the best sprints of his life, he had not done adequately to pay off his team's efforts on the day.

Cancellara was noticeably still recovering from his Milan–San Remo effort at Dwars door Vlaanderen, where he tried to attack for victory in the finale, but faded quickly and finished only 36th. The squad's best-placed rider was Posthuma in 31st. Cancellara's recovery was perhaps complete at the E3 Prijs Vlaanderen – Harelbeke. After a series of mechanical incidents, resulting in several wheel changes and then a whole bike change, Cancellara sped past the trailing peloton on the Oude Kwaremont climb and effortlessly bridged to the front of the race. Once there, he left even the front group on the road well behind him, winning the race by a full minute over second placed Vladimir Gusev. Cancellara said he was more impressed with this victory than when he won the same race in 2010, and analysis of his win suggested he stood as the odds-on favorite for the Tour of Flanders. Jonathan Vaughters, whose Garmin–Cervélo team had effectively controlled the front of the race but were powerless to stop Cancellara, stated that should an on-form Cancellara ever get even five seconds' advantage at the front of a race near the end, he would likely not be seen again. Vaughters joked that rival teams would need a sniper to stop the Swiss classics specialist.

Cancellara's pedigree, 2011 successes, and status as defending champion made him a major favorite for the second monument race, the Tour of Flanders. Cancellara put in a seemingly decisive move from the head of the main field on the Leberg, the fourteenth cobbled climb on the day's parcours. He quickly opened up a time gap of over a minute, and the race seemed to be decided. He cracked on the Muur van Geraardsbergen, however, and was swept up by an elite leading group of favorites and contenders. He put in a second acceleration on the last climb, the Bosberg, and was followed by Sylvain Chavanel and Nick Nuyens. Having perhaps spent himself too early in the race by attacking solo and not working with other riders to gain a large time gap, Cancellara could only manage third of the three. After the race, Cancellara blasted Nuyens and the other riders in the race, saying they only rode to keep him from winning. He referred to himself as a "gladiator" and said that the manner in which Nuyens won, staying in Cancellara's slipstream and then outsprinting him with the line in view, had no value in his eyes.

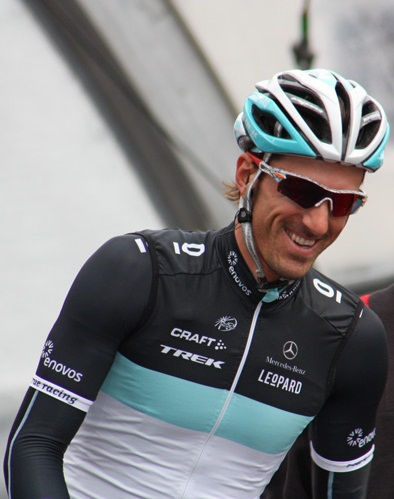
Fabian Cancellara was a marked man at the spring classics, but his many high placings gave him the world number one ranking after Paris–Roubaix.

Cancellara was again thought to be the odds-on favorite at the next monument classic, Paris–Roubaix. After an aggressive first two hours of racing kept any breakaway groups from going clear, a leading group of 21 slowly formed between the start of the cobbles and the Arenberg sector. They took a maximum advantage of two and a half minutes. The second group on the road gradually whittled down to a select group of top favorites. Cancellara tried several times to accelerate out of this group to bridge to the front of the race. Thor Hushovd, Alessandro Ballan, and Juan Antonio Flecha marked his moves, but did not contribute any work, instead simply holding Cancellara's wheel. Eventually, Cancellara decided against towing the superior sprinter Hushovd to the front of the race with him, and for a while forwent further attacks. During this time, the leaders' time gap held steady at about 90 seconds for many kilometers. Right about the time that Johan Vansummeren attacked from the leading group and got free to occupy first position on the road, with 15 km (9.3 mi) left to race, Cancellara did likewise out of the group of favorites, putting in easily his most intensive pull. Only Hushovd and Ballan could follow, and they stormed past the remnants of the earlier breakaway, with the exception of Vansummeren who remained out front for victory. Cancellara bested Maarten Tjallingii and Grégory Rast in a sprint for second place 19 seconds back of the Belgian. Cancellara again rued after the race that everyone had marked him and only him. He claimed that the non-cooperation of riders like Hushovd and Ballan had meant victory for him was not possible, and so second place for him was like a victory that day. Vaughters commented that Cancellara was indeed the strongest single rider in the race, but his squad had been the strongest team, which was why they won. Cancellara was also badly isolated from his teammates as a result of his rivals' tactics and his teammates' lesser form. The only other Leopard Trek rider after to finish the race was Mortensen in 94th, almost 14 minutes down. Cancellara's ride was not entirely without reward, as it was after Paris–Roubaix that he attained the UCI world number one ranking, thanks mostly to his three podium finishes at the monuments.

Cancellara was not considered to be a favorite for the Amstel Gold Race, though he was part of the strong squad that the Leopard Trek team brought to the race. Sporting director Kim Andersen stated the race was more of a goal for one of the Schleck brothers. Cancellara commented that he felt "free as a bird" in the Amstel, riding it for the first time since 2004, and that he was not under pressure to get a result. He identified Philippe Gilbert as the main favorite for the race, and promised not to ride against him as he felt his rivals had done to him in the cobbled classics. The race took place two days after Fränk Schleck's 30th birthday, further intensifying it as a goal for him. Cancellara and both Schleck brothers effectively stayed at the front of the race most of the day, but Cancellara and Fränk Schleck lost contact after crashing on the Gulperberg 28 km (17 mi) from the finish. This left Andy Schleck alone to fend for victory, and his tactic was a solo attack launched from 12 km (7.5 mi) out, on the Keutenberg. The tactic was nearly successful, as the younger Schleck brother occupied first position on the road with only 500 m (1,600 ft) left to race, but a chase pack led by Gilbert overhauled him at that point. Visibly spent from his solo effort, Schleck had nothing left for the finale and finished 11th, 28 seconds down on race winner Gilbert. He stated after the race that he was satisfied with his effort, feeling that going for the win from so far out was his only play for victory without any teammates in the front group. He may have finished a few positions higher if he had stayed with the Gilbert group, but he almost certainly would have had no chance for victory against the fast finisher Gilbert; thus, the solo attack was the correct move in his eyes, since his only ambition was victory. Danish rider Jakob Fuglsang, however, managed to snatch a result for the team, as he finished in 4th place, 5 seconds down on Gilbert.

The Schleck brothers were again the squad leaders for the remaining Ardennes classics, La Flèche Wallonne and Liège–Bastogne–Liège. Pre-race analyses mentioned them as contenders for both races. At La Flèche Wallonne, Andy Schleck worked for brother Fränk, taking pulls at the front of the main field to help chase down the morning breakaway. He did not feel physically up to riding for the win. Fränk was able to ride at the front of the race all day, and made the selections up to the race-concluding Mur de Huy. Philippe Gilbert made an early attack on the Mur and held on to win – Fränk was seventh, six seconds back. Both brothers rode well at Liège–Bastogne–Liège. On the Côte de Roche aux Faucons, 20 km (12 mi) from the end of the race, they both surged clear of the group of race favorites. Gilbert marked them, and stayed in their slipstreams as the trio surged to the front of the race. Later, the Belgian also took pulls, and even tried to solo for victory, but could not shake the Schlecks. The three survived to the finish, 24 seconds clear of a chase pack that formed on the Côte de Saint-Nicolas. Neither brother attacked in the finale, which came on a slight downhill, leaving the superior sprinter Gilbert to take a rather easy win, his fourth in 11 days.

Despite the spring classics season ending without any victories, Nygaard stated he felt satisfied with the many high placings the team had achieved, particularly in the face of Gilbert's clear strength. Additionally, Leopard Trek became the number one team in the UCI's rankings after Liège–Bastogne–Liège, a position they had occupied, to no small amount of criticism, before the season and before they officially existed. Nizzolo closed out the team's early-season account by with a podium finish at the inaugural ProRace Berlin, taking second in the mass sprint behind Skil–Shimano's Marcel Kittel.

The team also sent squads to Omloop Het Nieuwsblad, the Clásica de Almería, Kuurne–Brussels–Kuurne, the Scheldeprijs and the Eschborn–Frankfurt City Loop, but placed no higher than 11th in any of these races.

=== Fall races ===
The team had an excellent later half of the season in single-day races, attaining top-ten placings in all but one such race that they entered. This successful run started at the Clásica de San Sebastián. Both Schleck brothers were mentioned as possible pre-race contenders, and Fränk Schleck rode to sixth place on the day by finishing with the first chase pack back of solo winner Philippe Gilbert and second-placed Carlos Barredo. In August, Nizzolo continued his strong neo-pro season with a fifth place ride at the GP Ouest-France, finishing second-best from the peloton behind three attacking riders who took each podium place just ahead of them.

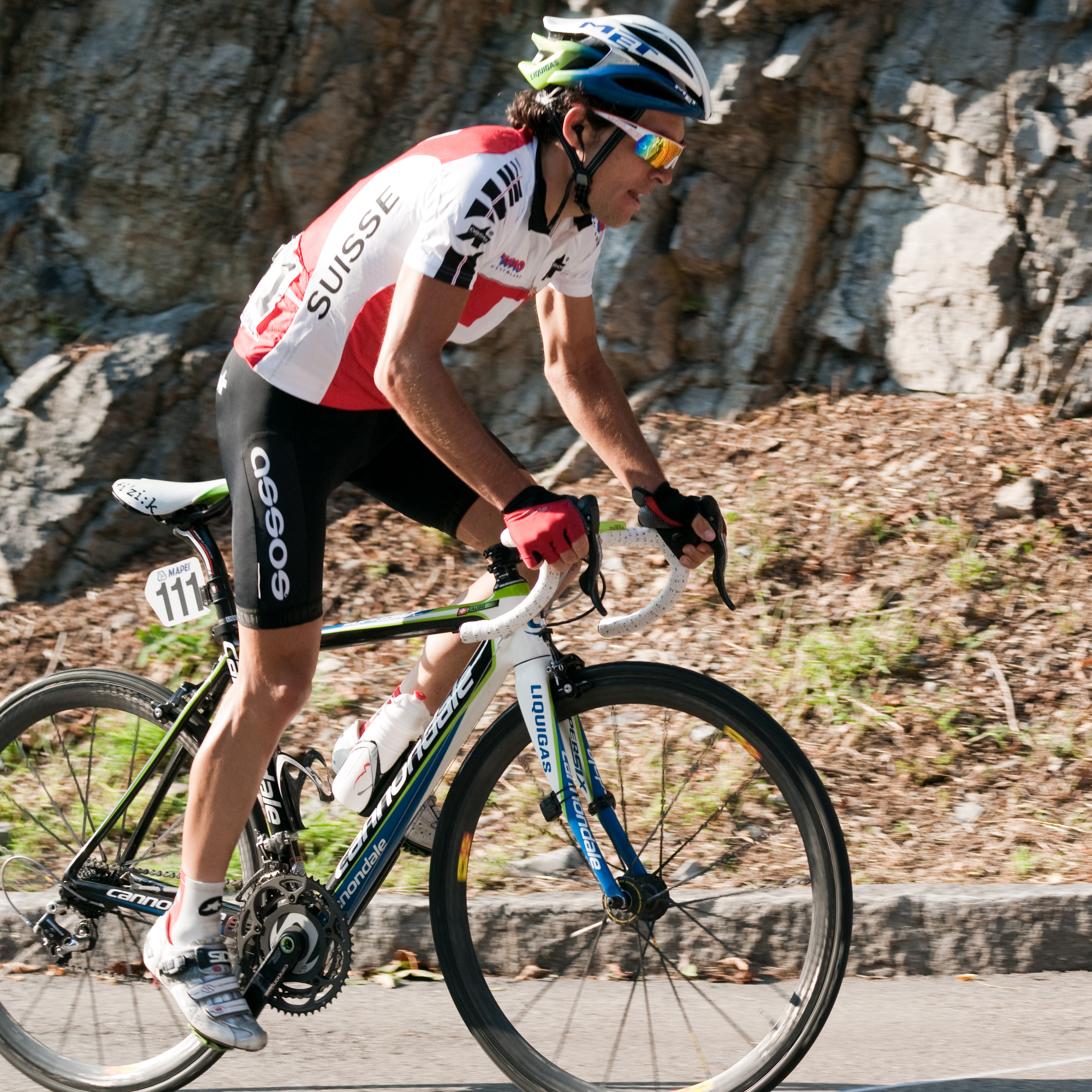
Oliver Zaugg, pictured here riding the 2009 world championships road race, won the monument classic the Giro di Lombardia for the first race victory of his professional career.

The team next took high placings at the two UCI World Tour races in Canada, the GP de Québec and the GP de Montréal. Though Andy Schleck intended to start the GP de Québec, he was forced to pull out due to dental issue. Wegmann was mentioned among the pre-race contenders, and it was indeed the veteran German who turned in the team's top performance. He followed eventual race winner Gilbert when the Belgian made his winning move on the course's penultimate climb, eventually coming in fourth at the finish, 14 seconds down. Denifl was the team's top rider two days later in Montréal. Part of a late breakaway, he occupied third position on the road until the final moments, when Gilbert and his Omega Pharma–Lotto teammate Jürgen Roelandts surpassed him, leaving him fifth on the day. Back in Europe later in September, the team achieved podium finishes at the Grand Prix de la Somme and the Grand Prix d'Isbergues. Wegmann finished third at the Grand Prix de la Somme, completing the podium behind Anthony Roux and Lloyd Mondory at the front of a 13-rider sprint finish. O'Grady then narrowly missed out on taking a first solo win in three years in Isbergues, losing a two-up sprint to Saxo Bank–SunGard's Jonas Aaen Jørgensen and settling for second place overall. Wagner led the peloton over the line 8 seconds later to give Leopard Trek two of the three podium spots.

In October, Wegmann rode to sixth place in his native Germany in the mass finish to the Sparkassen Giro. The next day, trainee rider Rüdiger Selig won a selective sprint finish at Binche–Tournai–Binche, beating out former Tour de France green jersey winner Baden Cooke and a field including seven first-division teams. Viganò nearly joined him on the podium, taking fourth place. Zaugg then showed signs of his coming late-season form at the Giro dell'Emilia, finishing in ninth place 33 seconds back of the solo winner. The team took two top-ten places at the next day, at concurrent races, the GP Bruno Beghelli and Paris–Tours. At the Italian race, Monfort found his way into a winning breakaway that formed as the morning's initial breakaway was caught, eventually finishing the day in 7th place, 21 seconds behind the winner Filippo Pozzato. At the same time in France, O'Grady rode to an 8th-place finish behind BMC Racing Team's Greg Van Avermaet.

With the team's merger with Team RadioShack already announced, the traditional season-closing weekend in Italy at the Giro del Piemonte and the Giro di Lombardia effectively figured to comprise the team's final races under this guise. At the Giro del Piemonte, Bennati made each of the day's selections, first a 31-rider group that formed at the 85 km (53 mi) to go mark and then a 14-rider break in the race's final kilometer. He could manage only seventh in the uphill final sprint, however.

The team did not have any rider highlighted as a favorite entering the Giro di Lombardia; pre-race analyses held Gilbert as the man to beat. Zaugg rode at the front of the race the entire day, riding off the front to occupy first position as the solo leader on the Villa Vergano climb. He then maintained his advantage on the alternating flat sections and remaining climbs (the Muro dell'Alpino and the finishing climb in Lecco), holding on for victory ahead of Garmin–Cervélo's Dan Martin and Team Katusha's Joaquim Rodríguez by 8 seconds. The victory was not only Zaugg's first monument classic win, or even his first single-day win, it was his first professional victory of any kind, coming at age 30. Post-race analysis compared Zaugg's triumph to some of the more notable upsets to which the race has played host in its history.

The team's lone miss to this level of success was at Vattenfall Cyclassics, where Wegmann finished as the team's best rider, in 15th place.

== Stage races ==
After the team had been shut out in early season stage races, Cancellara was victorious in the short individual time trial that closed out Tirreno–Adriatico. Taking the course some two hours before the race's top riders, the four-time world champion covered the 9.3 km (5.8 mi) distance in 10'33", and only one rider came within ten seconds of his time. At Critérium International in March, five-time champion Voigt was hopeful of breaking the record he shares with Émile Idée and Raymond Poulidor to stand alone as a six-time champion, but admitted that the course and the weather did not suit him, and so his chances would be slim. During the decisive stage 1, Voigt bridged up to a morning breakaway some 90 km (56 mi) from the finish on the Col de l'Ospedale. He said afterward that he might slip away unmarked and stay away for victory, but if he were chased it would make the race hard, and a hard race would suit the Schleck brothers. The latter scenario is exactly what occurred. Voigt was caught well before the summit of the Ospedale and finished the day in 75th place, over 20 minutes down, but the Schlecks both stayed with the front group on the road throughout the stage. Fränk Schleck put in his own attack for victory 2 km (1.2 mi) from the summit and stayed away for victory. Andy Schleck was tenth, a minute down on his brother. The elder Schleck brother held his advantage through the flat stage and individual time trial on day two of the three-stage race, emerging as overall victor.

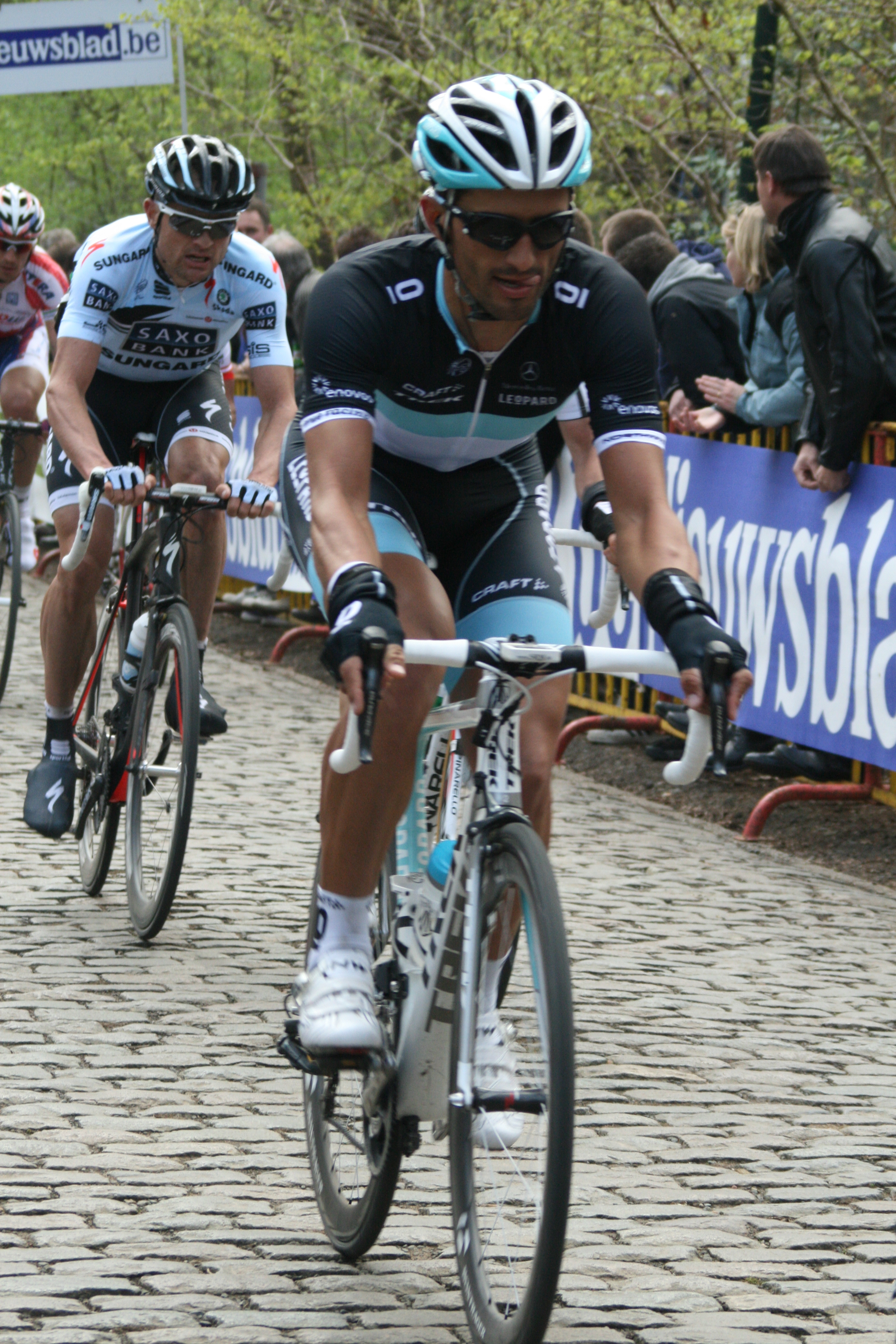
Daniele Bennati, pictured here at Gent–Wevelgem, was greatly successful at the Circuit de la Sarthe, winning three stages and the points jersey. He also won a stage each at the Tour of Austria and the Tour de Wallonie later in the season.

Bennati found great success at the Circuit de la Sarthe, taking his first wins in over a year at that race. The Italian sprinter first won stage 1 in a full field sprint before Garmin–Cervélo's Michel Kreder defeated him in the sprint finish the next day. Later the same day as stage 2, Bennati won the 6.8 km (4.2 mi) time trial to extend his overall lead. It was the first time trial Bennati had ever won as a professional. He finished six minutes down in the hilly fourth stage, losing any chance at winning the race overall, but he rebounded to claim a third win in the event in a reduced sprint in stage 5. Three wins and a second place meant he handily won the event's points classification as well.

The team rode with heavy hearts at the Tour of California in May. It was their first event back in competition after their mass withdrawal from the Giro d'Italia the day after the death of team member Wouter Weylandt. The race paid tribute to Weylandt by holding a moment of silence before its first stage and allowing the Leopard Trek team to lead the peloton into the neutralized zone, as well as all organization, staff, and riders wearing black armbands. The team did not attain any victories in the race, with Gerdemann in 11th place their best finisher. Neo-pro Nizzolo took the team's lone win in the month of May, triumphing in the field sprint finish to Bayern Rundfahrt's final stage.

The team proved to be a prolific winner in stage race events over the summer. The first was the Tour de Luxembourg, a race with special meaning for the team as it is in Luxembourg where they are headquartered and derive much of their identity. Several riders all but certain to participate in the forthcoming Tour de France rode the Tour de Luxembourg. Cancellara dominantly won the 2.6 km (1.6 mi) prologue individual time trial, finishing five seconds the better of Team Europcar's Damien Gaudin. No other time gap from one rider to the next exceeded three seconds, and most were only fractions of a second. Two days later, Gerdemann seized control of the race by winning stage 2 after dropping two breakaway companions. He rode solo to the win 9 seconds ahead of the peloton, which gave him the race lead. He retained through the conclusion of the race two days later, thus taking the overall crown. Later in the month of June came the Tour de Suisse. Cancellara again proved the best in the prologue time trial, this one 7.1 km (4.4 mi) long, besting HTC–Highroad's Tejay van Garderen by 9 seconds. He then won the longer time trial stage that concluded the event eight days later, a 32.1 km (19.9 mi) race against the clock. This performance was not as dominant, as his winning margin was again 9 seconds, this time over Team RadioShack's Andreas Klöden. The team missed out on the event's final podium but nonetheless showed strongly overall, with Fuglsang, Fränk Schleck, and Monfort all finishing in the top ten. Andy Schleck also took what is for his career a relative rarity gaining a noteworthy result outside the Tour de France. He won the climber's jersey, having first taken it after stage 7. Later in the summer, the team won stages at three further events, with Bennati winning sprints at the Tour of Austria and the Tour de Wallonie, and Fuglsang a solo win at the end of a finishing circuit in stage 3 at the Tour of Denmark.

The team also sent squads to the Tour Down Under, the Tour of Qatar, the Volta ao Algarve, Vuelta an Andalucía, Driedaagse van West-Vlaanderen, Paris–Nice, Volta a Catalunya, the Tour of the Basque Country, the Tour de Romandie, the Four Days of Dunkirk, the Tour of California, the Critérium du Dauphiné, Delta Tour Zeeland, the Ster ZLM Toer, the Tour de Pologne, the Eneco Tour, the USA Pro Cycling Challenge, the Tour du Poitou Charentes, the Tour of Britain, the Tour de Wallonie-Picarde and the Tour of Beijing, but did not achieve a stage win, classification win, or podium finish in any of them.

== Grand Tours ==
=== Giro d'Italia ===
Leopard Trek entered the Giro with limited aspirations. Squad leader Wegmann was a former Giro mountains classification winner, but he said he would not target that award in the 2011 Giro and instead hoped for a stage win. He said the squad would aim to finish eighth or better in the opening team time trial and that Zaugg was the squad's general classification rider, though it would be unlikely for him to finish higher than 15th. The squad came in 14th in the team time trial, finishing with eight riders together at a deficit of 42 seconds to the winners HTC–Highroad. Weylandt was ninth in the field sprint to finish stage 2 the next day.

==== Death of Wouter Weylandt ====
During the descent of the third-category Passo del Bocco in stage 3, Weylandt crashed and suffered catastrophic injury. Race doctor Giovanni Tredici and the doctor for the Garmin–Cervélo team were in cars very near Weylandt's group on the road, and administered cardiopulmonary resuscitation for approximately 40 minutes. Doctors also gave Weylandt adrenaline and atropine to try to restart his heart, though Tredici stated after the fact that resuscitation efforts were rather clearly in vain, and that Weylandt was already dead by the time they got to him. They were never able to revive the Belgian, and he was declared dead on the spot. A short time later, Weylandt's body was airlifted off the descent and taken to a nearby hospital, where the pathologist conducting the autopsy concluded that the Belgian had sustained a basilar skull fracture, and had died immediately upon crashing. Weylandt's death was the first at the Giro in 25 years, and the first at one of cycling's Grand Tours since Fabio Casartelli died during the 1995 Tour de France.

Manuel Antonio Cardoso of Team RadioShack had been nearest to Weylandt when he crashed, and stated that Weylandt had touched a small retaining wall on the left side of the road with either his pedal or his handlebars, and was then catapulted across the road to the other side, where he again collided with something. He had looked behind him to ascertain his exact position in the race when he clipped the wall. Teammate Stamsnijder also witnessed the accident, saying "it was a very hard fall." Italian police, conducting an inquest into Weylandt's death, also took an official statement from the Portuguese rider at Team RadioShack's hotel. A memorial was placed at the crash site, where Weylandt's widow and mother, along with cyclists, passersby and residents of nearby villages, placed flowers. The Leopard Trek team remained in the race for another day at the encouragement of Weylandt's family. Race leader David Millar spent the evening discussing with members of Leopard Trek, his teammate (and Weylandt's training partner and best friend) Tyler Farrar, and Weylandt's family how best to pay tribute to the fallen rider. Weylandt wore bib number 108 in the race, and Giro officials have said they will not assign the number in future editions of the race.

The next day's stage was preceded by a minute's silence, and ridden as a procession in Weylandt's memory. In keeping with convention, there was no competitive racing. Each of the 23 teams took to the front of the peloton for about 15 minutes, and the remaining Leopard Trek squad, along with Farrar, were allowed to finish first with their arms around each other. Millar led the rest of the field across the line a few seconds later. No results for the stage were recorded, and it did not count towards the general classification or any of the points competitions. After the stage, instead of any podium presentations, the four jersey classification leaders (Millar, Alessandro Petacchi, Gianluca Brambilla, and Jan Bakelants) appeared on stage with the Leopard Trek team to lead another moment of silence. Subsequently, Farrar and the remaining Leopard Trek squad all decided to leave the race. Feillu did not want to leave the Giro, feeling that continuing to race would have been the best way to honor Weylandt, but he did not mind acquiescing to his teammates' will. For most of them, the decision was based on a desire to attend Weylandt's funeral, which took place nine days after his death. Members of the Giro squad served as pallbearers. Other teammates, as well as Farrar, members of Weylandt's former team Quick-Step, and Giro director Angelo Zomegnan were all in attendance, along with hundreds of cycling fans assembled outside the chapel.

=== Tour de France ===
Leopard Trek came to the Tour de France with, per season-long expectations, a squad centered around overall victory. The leader was probably Andy Schleck, entering as runner-up in the past two Tours de France and three-times running winner of the young rider classification, an award for which he was no longer eligible. Brother Fränk said his goal was to have Andy win the Tour, with Fränk himself also there on the podium with him. The remaining squad members were Cancellara, Gerdemann, Monfort, Fuglsang, Voigt, O'Grady, and Posthuma. Every rider on the squad had ridden the Tour de France before, and all but Monfort, Fuglsang, and Posthuma had previously worn the yellow jersey. Pre-race analysis speculated Cancellara could aim for a few days in the race lead before the course shifted to the high mountains.

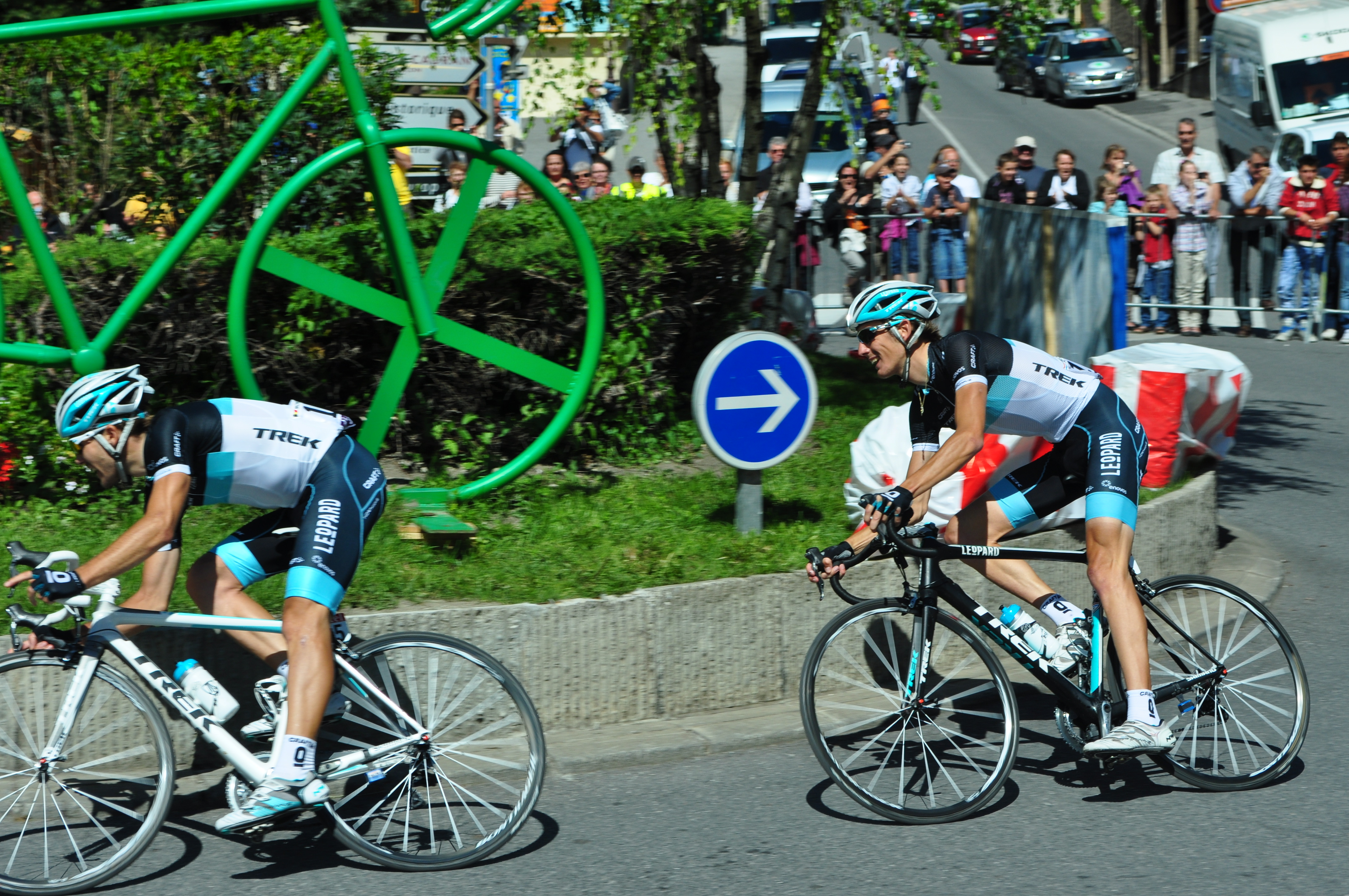
Maxime Monfort leads Andy Schleck during stage 18, prior to the latter's eventual solo victory.

Cancellara showed himself in the finale of the Tour's first stage, which featured a mostly flat course culminating in a short uphill finish. He attacked for victory inside the final kilometer, but Omega Pharma–Lotto's Philippe Gilbert quickly closed the gap, effectively neutralizing the move. Cancellara then sat up (abandoned any further attempts to win), and finished 18th. Both Schleck brothers managed to stay at the front of the race ahead of two major crashes toward the end, which led to riders such as Samuel Sánchez and Alberto Contador losing a minute and 20 seconds. The next day's team time trial presented an opportunity for the squad. With four-time and reigning world time trial champion Cancellara leading them, they rode to fourth place on the day, within fractions of a second of BMC Racing Team and Team Sky and four seconds the lesser of the day's winners Garmin–Cervélo. While the team missed out on taking the yellow jersey, the ride did install Gerdemann, Fränk Schleck, and Cancellara into fifth through seventh place overall, with Andy Schleck in tenth and Fuglsang in 11th tied on the same time, giving the team several options going forward. Two days later, Fränk Schleck was the team's best man on the Mûr-de-Bretagne, finishing in the leading group with stage winner Cadel Evans. Brother Andy, along with Fuglsang, was in the chase group eight seconds back. Cancellara finished with the second-to-last group a little over four minutes down on the winner, ruling him out of any possibility of wearing the yellow jersey in this Tour.

The next several stages favored sprinters and a solo breakaway winner. The overall standings did not change until stage 9, when a breakaway group involving Thomas Voeckler gained sufficient time that the veteran Frenchman became the new race leader. The Schleck brothers were two and a half minutes down in the classification at this point, but within a few seconds of the nearest true overall favorite Evans. Fuglsang as well remained in the top ten, 30 seconds the lesser of Andy Schleck and just over three minutes off the race lead. Fränk Schleck took time out of the bulk of the field in stage 12. With 2.5 km (1.6 mi) remaining in the stage-concluding climb to Luz Ardiden, the elder Schleck brother broke free of the group of the race's top riders in pursuit of two down the road. He did not quite reach them, finishing ten seconds back on the day, but the ride moved him up to second place overall, 28 seconds ahead of his brother and 17 the better of Evans. The brothers both missed an important move in stage 16, ending on the descent from the second-category Col de Manse. Contador, Sánchez, and Evans rode the most aggressive descent, a tactic which gained them a solid measure of time. Evans took 21 seconds out of Fränk Schleck to re-assume second place overall; the younger Schleck brother lost a full minute and six seconds to the veteran Australian.

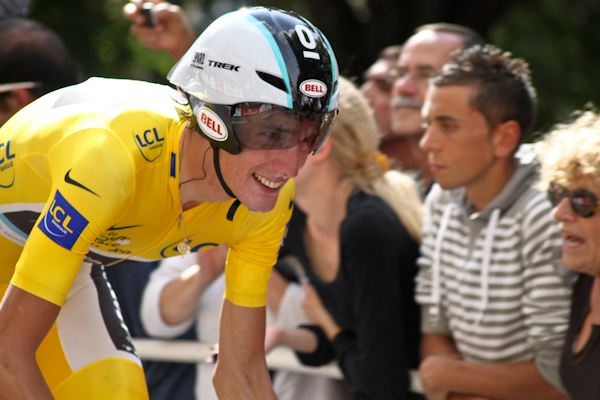
Team captain Andy Schleck wore the yellow jersey for one day in the Tour de France, but his performance in the stage 20 individual time trial while wearing that jersey was insufficient to win him the Tour overall.

The team set about taking time back in the high mountain stage 18, ending with an hors catégorie arrival at the Col du Galibier. Monfort and Posthuma both made the morning breakaway, providing support for Andy Schleck after he attacked out of the group of overall favorites on the ascent of the Col d'Izoard. Schleck bridged first to Posthuma and then to Monfort, the latter guiding him down the 17 km (11 mi) long descent of the Izoard, as Schleck is a superlative climber but a poor descender. After catching and surpassing all other remaining members from the morning breakaway, Monfort then rode an extremely lengthy and strenuous pull ahead of Schleck until 17 km (11 mi) remained in the stage, when he finally bonked and dropped back. This left Andy free to climb the Galibier solo, taking the stage win alone two minutes ahead of the next rider, which happened to be brother Fränk. He rode clear of the group of the race's top riders in the final kilometer, gaining eight seconds against Evans. While the team's tactics on the day appeared to cinch the yellow jersey for Andy, prior race leader Voeckler retained the yellow jersey by a margin of 15 seconds. The status quo among the Schlecks and Evans held on stage 19, though with Voeckler finally falling from the top of the overall classification that gave Andy Schleck the yellow jersey ahead of the stage 20 individual time trial. Stage 19, ending at Alpe d'Huez, had favored Schleck ahead of Evans, and he was characterized as missing an important opportunity to pad his lead ahead of the time trial, where Evans' skills are superior.

Though Evans was the stronger of the two against the clock, Schleck had surpassed expectations in the long time trial at the 2010 Tour de France, leading to speculation as to whether his 57-second cushion over the Australian could be sufficient for him to win the Tour. Evans rode one of the best time trials of his career, finishing in second place seven seconds off the pace of Tony Martin, the rider who was crowned world time trial champion later that year. Andy said of his and his brother's rides that they were probably the best time trials likewise of their respective careers, but they were no match for Evans' performance. The Australian was two and a half minutes better than both of them, taking the overall lead by a minute and a half with Andy slipping to second and Fränk to third. Since the Tour's final stage is traditionally mostly ceremonial save for a final sprint finish, the time trial effectively cemented the final overall standings. Andy took the positive from the result, saying he and his brother were both proud of each other for their efforts and were excited to stand on the podium together in Paris, even if neither of them was on the top step.

=== Vuelta a España ===
Leopard Trek's squad for the Vuelta a España consisted of Bennati, Cancellara, Fuglsang, Monfort, O'Grady, Viganò, Wagner, Zaugg, and Rohregger. Bennati was speculated to be a contender for the Vuelta's sprint stages, while for Cancellara the race represented an opportunity to hone his form ahead of the world championships. No rider on the squad was highlighted as an overall contender.

The squad was one of the first to start the stage 1 team time trial. Viganò crashed at one point and finished almost three minutes behind his teammates, but the squad still managed to put up the day's winning time, finishing with the necessary five riders together four seconds the better of defending Vuelta champion Vincenzo Nibali's Liquigas–Cannondale squad. Fuglsang was the rider who crossed the line first, making him the first wearer of the race leader's red jersey. He said after the stage that the team had not pre-determined who would cross the line first, as is customarily the case in advance of a team time trial. It had simply been Fuglsang's turn to ride on the front when the finish line came. He said would try to ride for the overall classification, with Bennati and Cancellara to hunt for stage wins in the sprints and individual time trial, respectively. Bennati contested the sprint finish the next day, taking sixth behind Christopher Sutton. Since Fuglsang also finished at the front of the race, combined stage finishes meant that Bennati would take the red jersey for stage 3. Solo stage winner Pablo Lastras claimed the jersey the next day, but Fuglsang and Monfort continued to be well-placed in the overall standings.

Neither dropped below 11th place overall heading into the stage 10 individual time trial, where the squad had three riders finish in the top ten. Cancellara's fourth-place ride was perhaps a disappointment, in that he finished a minute and 27 seconds slower than the stage winner Tony Martin, the rider seen as his chief rival for the world championships time trial. (Note: Martin indeed did go on to win the world time trial championship, beating Cancellara by a minute and 20 seconds that day.) Fuglsang took sixth on the day and Monfort tenth, putting Fuglsang 12 seconds off the race lead in second place overall and Monfort sixth 59 seconds back. Both of them lost time in stage 11, finishing in a group 27 seconds back of the group containing most of the race's top riders, but both remained in the top ten overall. Both again fell down the standings in stage 14 on La Farrapona, a day when out of the first 50 riders no more than four finished together. Their overall positions reversed the next day on the storied Alto del Angliru. Monfort finished with a group that lost time to only six riders, while Fuglsang was a further minute and eight seconds down the road from his teammate. This left Monfort fifth overall and Fuglsang seventh, after Fuglsang had been the higher-placed of the two for the entire race to that point. The next major mountain was Peña Cabarga in stage 17. Both riders were well off the pace, with Monfort finishing 19th and Fuglsang 31st. Monfort still held sixth overall with the result, but Fuglsang fell out of the top ten, down to 12th place. Fuglsang improved a place to 11th after stage 19, when Wouter Poels, who had been ahead of him, finished six minutes behind the main field. Those were their final overall positions, with both Monfort's sixth place and Fuglsang's 11th representing the best such finishes for either of them in a Grand Tour. The day before the race ended, Bennati gave the team a second stage win, coming home first in a large sprint finish in stage 20 at Vitoria.

== Away from competition ==
=== Merger with Team RadioShack ===
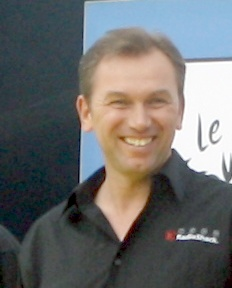
Team ownership sought out Johan Bruyneel to become the team's new manager for 2012, believing his experience at the helm of nine Tour de France winning teams would be crucial to their ongoing success.

During the Vuelta a España, reports surfaced that the Leopard Trek team was in talks to bring in sponsorship and management from the American-based Team RadioShack. Reports suggested that team owner Flavio Becca was dissatisfied with the team's management and aimed to bring aboard Johan Bruyneel and others from Team RadioShack. While team officials for Leopard Trek initially denied the rumor, and Bruyneel refused to address them altogether, the merger was confirmed by both sides on September 6, with five days remaining in the Vuelta. Becca had sought out Bruyneel because of his history of successes in the Tour de France, guiding Lance Armstrong to seven championships there and Alberto Contador to two. Bruyneel later commented that he looked forward to trying to add Andy Schleck's name to his list of Tour success stories. Bruyneel's arrival effectively ousted Brian Nygaard, who immediately left his position as the team's general manager; it is unclear who, if anyone, succeeded him for the remainder of 2011. Becca offered him a lesser position within the team, but Nygaard refused it, saying it was as good as being fired. Upon announcing Nygaard's departure, Becca also revealed that his company would hold the fused team's license and that it would continue to be based out of Luxembourg, essentially confirming the 2012 entity as an extension of this franchise while Team RadioShack would be considered defunct.

What followed was a period of uncertainty regarding exactly who would and would not be a part of the merged team. Leopard Trek had 27 riders under contract for 2012 and Team RadioShack had 13 – UCI rules impose a hard limit of 30 riders on top-level teams, meaning at least ten riders with valid contracts would be released from them. Leopard Trek riders were not told about the merger ahead of time and were unsure of their status at a time when riders everywhere looked to conclusively determine their places of employment for the upcoming season. The situation was further complicated by two rider transfers made in August, when Ben Hermans and Grégory Rast signed with Leopard Trek away from Team RadioShack, meaning they had effectively re-joined the team they had only just left. The new team also signed four riders who had not been a member of either side in 2011. This resulted in 12 riders departing for other teams, with 13 incoming from Team RadioShack's 2011 formation (that number including Hermans and Rast) and 12 riders being retained from Leopard Trek's 2011 formation. The fused team announced its new name as RadioShack-Nissan-Trek, though UCI rules limit registry to two title sponsors, meaning their name in the official UCI record is RadioShack-Nissan.

Reactions to the merger were widespread. Amid descriptions of the team as a "super-team" from at least one analyst were Team Saxo Bank manager Bjarne Riis' claims that he simply looked forward to defeating them. Cervélo co-founder and former Cervélo TestTeam manager Gerard Vroomen saw the merger on a strictly business level, with neither side having sufficient resources to field a team at the level they would like, while cooperatively they would. Trek had been bike supplier for both teams in 2011, and funneling money they would normally spend on two teams into one, coupled with an expected reduction in support from the electronics company RadioShack, would make it all the simpler for them to back a top-level team. The merger also drew criticism, as the two sides' initial press releases describing it did not make it seem that they were in agreement over their perception of the merger and the newly combined entity. The fact that neither ridership nor lower-level management nor ousted sponsors seemed to know about the move at all ahead of time also drew criticism.

=== Rider breakdown ===
With 58 riders – excluding Wouter Weylandt, after his death at the Giro d'Italia – competing for Leopard Trek and Team RadioShack during the 2011 season, a battle for places on the squad ensued. As UCI regulations stipulated that a squad could not have more than 30 riders for the season, many riders were left without a guaranteed place in the merged RadioShack–Nissan team for the 2012 season. Thirteen riders remained within the Leopard SA-licensed setup for 2012; the two-year contracts of Daniele Bennati and Jakob Fuglsang, as well as the three-year contracts of Fabian Cancellara and Maxime Monfort, and the four-year contracts for Andy Schleck and Fränk Schleck, were all honoured. Joost Posthuma, Jens Voigt, and Oliver Zaugg, who had all joined the team on one-year contracts in 2011, extended their deals to remain with the team into 2012. Linus Gerdemann also remained with the team, despite having been linked with Team Katusha, while Thomas Rohregger signed a new two-year deal with the team. Also remaining with the team were Giacomo Nizzolo and Robert Wagner.

==== Riders in ====
A total of seventeen riders joined the Leopard SA setup for 2012, of which thirteen riders had been part of Team RadioShack in 2011. These riders included American national champion Matthew Busche, Tour of California winner Chris Horner, Vuelta an Andalucía victor Markel Irizar, and Andreas Klöden, who won the Tour of the Basque Country in 2011. Also joining from Team RadioShack were stagiaire George Bennett – signing his first professional contract – as well as Ben Hermans, Ben King, and Portuguese duo Tiago Machado, and Nelson Oliveira. Yaroslav Popovych and Grégory Rast both signed with the team to bolster their efforts in the Classic races, while Jesse Sergent and Haimar Zubeldia followed the lead of some of their team-mates to join the newly formed team.

The four remaining places on the roster were taken by riders who had not been involved with the merging of the two teams, and joined RadioShack-Nissan-Trek from rival squads; Jan Bakelants joined from the Omega Pharma–Lotto team, Laurent Didier from Saxo Bank–SunGard, Tony Gallopin left Cofidis to join the team, while Hayden Roulston joined from HTC–Highroad, which also ceased to exist at the end of the season.

==== Riders out ====
Aside from Weylandt, thirteen members of Leopard Trek in 2011 did not continue with the merged team in 2012. Will Clarke joined Champion System as the squad made their début as a UCI Professional Continental Team in 2012. Stefan Denifl and Martin Mortensen both joined Vacansoleil–DCM, while Anders Lund and Bruno Pires joined Team Saxo Bank. Other riders to join UCI ProTeams were Stuart O'Grady, who joined the new-for-2012 GreenEDGE team, Davide Viganò left for the Lampre–ISD team, Fabian Wegmann joined Garmin–Barracuda, and late-season stagiaire Rüdiger Selig joined Team Katusha for the 2012 season. Elsewhere, Dominic Klemme and Tom Stamsnijder joined Project 1t4i, later Argos–Shimano; Brice Feillu found a place on the roster of the Saur–Sojasun team, while Martin Pedersen signed with domestic Continental team Christina Watches–Onfone.

== Season victories ==
Date	Race	Competition	Rider	Country	Location
February 20	Tour of Oman, Teams classification	UCI Asia Tour	(Note: The riders on the squad were Fabian Cancellara, Daniele Bennati, Jakob Fuglsang, Maxime Monfort, Stuart O'Grady, Joost Posthuma, Davide Viganò, and Wouter Weylandt)	Oman	
March 2	Le Samyn	UCI Europe Tour	Dominic Klemme (GER)	Belgium	Dour
March 15	Tirreno–Adriatico, Stage 7	UCI World Tour	Fabian Cancellara (SUI)	Italy	San Benedetto del Tronto
March 26	E3 Prijs Vlaanderen – Harelbeke	UCI Europe Tour	Fabian Cancellara (SUI)	Belgium	Harelbeke
March 26	Critérium International, Stage 1	UCI Europe Tour	Fränk Schleck (LUX)	France	Col de l'Ospedale
March 27	Critérium International, Overall	UCI Europe Tour	Fränk Schleck (LUX)	France	
April 5	Circuit de la Sarthe, Stage 1	UCI Europe Tour	Daniele Bennati (ITA)	France	Saint-Mars-la-Jaille
April 6	Circuit de la Sarthe, Stage 3	UCI Europe Tour	Daniele Bennati (ITA)	France	Angers
April 8	Circuit de la Sarthe, Stage 5	UCI Europe Tour	Daniele Bennati (ITA)	France	Bonnétable
April 8	Circuit de la Sarthe, Points classification	UCI Europe Tour	Daniele Bennati (ITA)	France	
May 29	Bayern-Rundfahrt, Stage 5	UCI Europe Tour	Giacomo Nizzolo (ITA)	Germany	Moosburg
June 1	Tour de Luxembourg, Prologue	UCI Europe Tour	Fabian Cancellara (SUI)	Luxembourg	Luxembourg City
June 3	Tour de Luxembourg, Stage 2	UCI Europe Tour	Linus Gerdemann (GER)	Luxembourg	Differdange
June 5	Tour de Luxembourg, Overall	UCI Europe Tour	Linus Gerdemann (GER)	Luxembourg	
June 11	Tour de Suisse, Stage 1	UCI World Tour	Fabian Cancellara (SUI)	Switzerland	Lugano
June 19	Tour de Suisse, Stage 9	UCI World Tour	Fabian Cancellara (SUI)	Switzerland	Schaffhausen
June 19	Tour de Suisse, Mountains classification	UCI World Tour	Andy Schleck (LUX)	Switzerland	
June 19	Tour de Suisse, Teams classification	UCI World Tour	(Note: The riders on the squad were Fränk Schleck, Fabian Cancellara, Jakob Fuglsang, Linus Gerdemann, Maxime Monfort, Stuart O'Grady, Andy Schleck, and Jens Voigt)	Switzerland	
July 10	Tour of Austria, Stage 8	UCI Europe Tour	Daniele Bennati (ITA)	Austria	Vienna
July 21	Tour de France, Stage 18	UCI World Tour	Andy Schleck (LUX)	France	Galibier–Serre Chevalier
July 25	Tour de Wallonie, Stage 3	UCI Europe Tour	Daniele Bennati (ITA)	Belgium	Perwez
August 5	Tour of Denmark, Stage 3	UCI Europe Tour	Jakob Fuglsang (DEN)	Denmark	Vejle
August 20	Vuelta a España, Stage 1	UCI World Tour	Team time trial (Note: The riders on the squad were Daniele Bennati, Fabian Cancellara, Jakob Fuglsang, Maxime Monfort, Stuart O'Grady, Davide Viganò, Robert Wagner, Oliver Zaugg, and Thomas Rohregger)	Spain	Benidorm
September 10	Vuelta a España, Stage 20	UCI World Tour	Daniele Bennati (ITA)	Spain	Vitoria
October 4	Binche–Tournai–Binche	UCI Europe Tour	Rüdiger Selig (GER) (Note: Riding as a stagiaire (trainee))	Belgium	Binche
October 15	Giro di Lombardia	UCI World Tour	Oliver Zaugg (SUI)	Italy	Lecco
