= 2012 RadioShack–Nissan season =

2012 RadioShack–Nissan season
Manager	Johan Bruyneel
One-day victories	1
Stage race overall victories	3
Stage race stage victories	8
Previous season • Next season

The 2012 season for the RadioShack–Nissan cycling team began in January at the Tour Down Under. As a UCI ProTeam, they were automatically invited and obligated to send a squad to every event in the UCI World Tour.

For the 2012 season, the team was renamed from Leopard Trek to RadioShack–Nissan; in effect merging with the American Team RadioShack, which ceased racing, and their former sponsors joined the Luxembourg-based squad. Johan Bruyneel along with twelve riders from the 2011 Team RadioShack squad moved to the team, joining eighteen riders from the Leopard Trek squad.

== Team roster ==
Ages as of 1 January 2012.

Rider	Date of birth
Jan Bakelants (BEL)	14 February 1986 (aged 25)
Daniele Bennati (ITA)	24 September 1980 (aged 31)
George Bennett (NZL)	7 April 1990 (aged 21)
Matthew Busche (USA)	9 May 1985 (aged 26)
Fabian Cancellara (SUI)	18 March 1981 (aged 30)
Laurent Didier (LUX)	19 July 1984 (aged 27)
Jakob Fuglsang (DEN)	22 March 1985 (aged 26)
Tony Gallopin (FRA)	24 May 1988 (aged 23)
Linus Gerdemann (GER)	16 September 1982 (aged 29)
Ben Hermans (BEL)	8 June 1986 (aged 25)
Chris Horner (USA)	10 November 1971 (aged 40)
Markel Irizar (ESP)	5 February 1980 (aged 31)
Ben King (USA)	22 March 1989 (aged 22)
Andreas Klöden (GER)	22 June 1975 (aged 36)
Tiago Machado (POR)	18 October 1985 (aged 26)

Rider	Date of birth
Maxime Monfort (BEL)	14 January 1983 (aged 28)
Giacomo Nizzolo (ITA)	30 January 1989 (aged 22)
Nelson Oliveira (POR)	6 March 1989 (aged 22)
Yaroslav Popovych (UKR)	4 January 1980 (aged 31)
Joost Posthuma (NED)	8 March 1981 (aged 30)
Grégory Rast (SUI)	17 January 1980 (aged 31)
Thomas Rohregger (AUT)	23 December 1982 (aged 29)
Hayden Roulston (NZL)	10 January 1981 (aged 30)
Andy Schleck (LUX)	10 June 1985 (aged 26)
Fränk Schleck (LUX)	15 April 1980 (aged 31)
Jesse Sergent (NZL)	8 July 1988 (aged 23)
Jens Voigt (GER)	17 September 1971 (aged 40)
Robert Wagner (GER)	17 April 1983 (aged 28)
Oliver Zaugg (SUI)	9 May 1981 (aged 30)
Haimar Zubeldia (ESP)	1 April 1977 (aged 34)

Riders who joined the team for the 2012 season

Rider	2011 team
Jan Bakelants	Omega Pharma–Lotto
George Bennett	stagiaire (Team RadioShack)
Matthew Busche	Team RadioShack
Laurent Didier	Saxo Bank–SunGard
Tony Gallopin	Cofidis
Ben Hermans	Team RadioShack
Chris Horner	Team RadioShack
Markel Irizar	Team RadioShack
Ben King	Team RadioShack
Andreas Klöden	Team RadioShack
Tiago Machado	Team RadioShack
Nelson Oliveira	Team RadioShack
Yaroslav Popovych	Team RadioShack
Grégory Rast	Team RadioShack
Hayden Roulston	HTC–Highroad
Jesse Sergent	Team RadioShack
Haimar Zubeldia	Team RadioShack

Riders who left the team during or after the 2011 season

Rider	2011 team
Will Clarke	Champion System
Stefan Denifl	Vacansoleil–DCM
Brice Feillu	Saur–Sojasun
Dominic Klemme	Project 1t4i
Anders Lund	Team Saxo Bank
Martin Mortensen	Vacansoleil–DCM
Stuart O'Grady	GreenEDGE
Martin Pedersen	Christina Watches–Onfone
Bruno Pires	Team Saxo Bank
Tom Stamsnijder	Project 1t4i
Davide Viganò	Lampre–ISD
Fabian Wegmann	Garmin–Barracuda
Wouter Weylandt	Deceased

== Season victories ==
Date	Race	Competition	Rider	Country	Location
22 January	Tour Down Under, Teams classification	UCI World Tour	(Note: The riders on the squad were Daniele Bennati, Linus Gerdemann, Jan Bakelants, Tiago Machado, Hayden Roulston, Jesse Sergent and Jens Voigt)	Australia	
19 February	Tour of Oman, Young rider classification	UCI Asia Tour	Tony Gallopin (FRA)	Oman	
19 February	Tour of Oman, Teams classification	UCI Asia Tour	(Note: The riders on the squad were Andy Schleck, Fabian Cancellara, Joost Posthuma, Jakob Fuglsang, Tony Gallopin, Yaroslav Popovych, Grégory Rast and Robert Wagner)	Oman	
23 February	Vuelta a Andalucía, Teams classification	UCI Europe Tour	(Note: The riders on the squad were Markel Irizar, Fränk Schleck, Jens Voigt, Haimar Zubeldia, Daniele Bennati, Linus Gerdemann and Maxime Monfort)	Spain	
3 March	Strade Bianche	UCI Europe Tour	Fabian Cancellara (SUI)	Italy	Siena
13 March	Tirreno–Adriatico, Stage 7	UCI World Tour	Fabian Cancellara (SUI)	Italy	San Benedetto del Tronto
6 April	Circuit de la Sarthe, Teams classification	UCI Europe Tour	(Note: The riders on the squad were George Bennett, Laurent Didier, Nelson Oliveira, Ben Hermans, Andy Schleck and Jan Bakelants)	France	
20 May	Tour of California, Teams classification	UCI America Tour	(Note: The riders on the squad were Ben King, Chris Horner, George Bennett, Grégory Rast, Jens Voigt, Markel Irizar, Matthew Busche and Tiago Machado)	United States	
27 May	Bayern-Rundfahrt, Young rider classification	UCI Europe Tour	Tony Gallopin (FRA)	Germany	
3 June	Tour de Luxembourg, Overall	UCI Europe Tour	Jakob Fuglsang (DEN)	Luxembourg	
3 June	Tour de Luxembourg, Teams classification	UCI Europe Tour	(Note: The riders on the squad were Linus Gerdemann, Laurent Didier, Jakob Fuglsang, Fränk Schleck, Andreas Klöden, Maxime Monfort, Grégory Rast and Jens Voigt)	Luxembourg	
30 June	Tour de France, Prologue	UCI World Tour	Fabian Cancellara (SUI)	Belgium	Liège
4 July	Tour of Austria, Stage 4	UCI Europe Tour	Jakob Fuglsang (DEN)	Austria	Sankt Johann im Pongau
8 July	Tour of Austria, Overall	UCI Europe Tour	Jakob Fuglsang (DEN)	Austria	
8 July	Tour of Austria, Teams classification	UCI Europe Tour	(Note: The riders on the squad were George Bennett, Matthew Busche, Markel Irizar, Ben King, Laurent Didier, Jakob Fuglsang, Thomas Rohregger and Oliver Zaugg)	Austria	
22 July	Tour de France, Teams classification	UCI World Tour	(Note: The riders on the squad were Fränk Schleck, Fabian Cancellara, Tony Gallopin, Chris Horner, Andreas Klöden, Maxime Monfort, Yaroslav Popovych, Jens Voigt and Haimar Zubeldia)	France	
23 July	Tour de Wallonie, Stage 3	UCI Europe Tour	Giacomo Nizzolo (ITA)	Belgium	Beaufays
25 July	Tour de Wallonie, Overall	UCI Europe Tour	Giacomo Nizzolo (ITA)	Belgium	
25 July	Tour de Wallonie, Young rider classification	UCI Europe Tour	Giacomo Nizzolo (ITA)	Belgium	
25 July	Tour de Wallonie, Mountains classification	UCI Europe Tour	Laurent Didier (LUX)	Belgium	
10 August	Eneco Tour, Stage 5	UCI World Tour	Giacomo Nizzolo (ITA)	Belgium	Aalter
12 August	Eneco Tour, Points classification	UCI World Tour	Giacomo Nizzolo (ITA)	(Note: Race held in Belgium and the Netherlands.)	
12 August	Tour of Utah, Teams classification	UCI America Tour	(Note: The riders on the squad were Chris Horner, George Bennett, Matthew Busche, Ben King, Joost Posthuma, Thomas Rohregger, Jens Voigt and Oliver Zaugg)	United States	
23 August	Tour du Poitou-Charentes, Stage 3	UCI Europe Tour	Giacomo Nizzolo (ITA)	France	La Roche-Posay
23 August	USA Pro Cycling Challenge, Stage 4	UCI America Tour	Jens Voigt (GER)	United States	Beaver Creek
26 August	USA Pro Cycling Challenge, Mountains classification	UCI America Tour	Jens Voigt (GER)	United States	
26 August	USA Pro Cycling Challenge, Teams classification	UCI America Tour	(Note: The riders on the squad were Andreas Klöden, Ben King, Chris Horner, George Bennett, Jakob Fuglsang, Jens Voigt, Matthew Busche, Oliver Zaugg and Thomas Rohregger)	United States	
6 September	Vuelta a España, Stage 18	UCI World Tour	Daniele Bennati (ITA)	Spain	Valladolid
