= Robert Wagner (cyclist) =

German cyclist

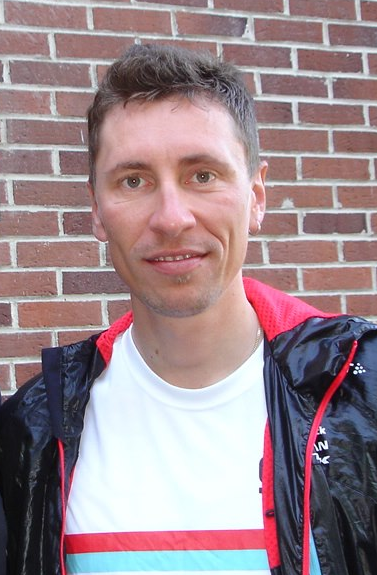
- Wagner at the 2012 Grand Prix de Fourmies

Personal information
- Full name: Robert Thomas Wagner
- Born: 17 April 1983 (age 43) Magdeburg, East Germany
- Height: 1.86 m (6 ft 1 in)
- Weight: 75 kg (165 lb)

Cycling career
- Sport: Cycling
- Current team: Visma–Lease a Bike Development
- Discipline: Road
- Role: Rider (retired); Directeur sportif
- Rider type: Sprinter

Professional teams
- 2006: Team Milram
- 2007: Wiesenhof–Felt
- 2008–2010: Skil–Shimano
- 2011–2012: Leopard Trek
- 2013–2018: Blanco Pro Cycling
- 2019: Arkéa–Samsic

Managerial team
- 2020–: Jumbo–Visma Development Team

Major wins
- One-day races and Classics National Road Race Championships (2011)

Robert Thomas Wagner (born 17 April 1983) is a German former professional cyclist, who competed professionally between 2006 and 2019 for the Team Milram, Wiesenhof–Felt, Skil–Shimano, RadioShack–Nissan, LottoNL–Jumbo and Arkéa–Samsic teams. He won the German National Road Race Championships in 2011, and was named in the start list for the 2016 Tour de France.

Wagner now works as a directeur sportif for UCI Continental team Visma–Lease a Bike Development.

== Major results ==
2005
1st Stage 8 Thüringen Rundfahrt der U23
2nd Time trial, National Under-23 Road Championships
2006
3rd Ronde van Noord-Holland
5th Rund um Düren
5th Neuseen Classics
2007
6th Schaal Sels
2008
1st Ronde van Noord-Holland
2nd Overall Delta Tour Zeeland

1st Stage 1

4th Kampioenschap van Vlaanderen
10th Trofeo Mallorca
2009
2nd Omloop van het Houtland
3rd Overall Delta Tour Zeeland

1st Stage 2

5th Sparkassen Giro Bochum
7th Ronde van Overijssel
9th Overall Tour de Picardie
9th Schaal Sels
2010
1st Ronde van Noord-Holland
1st Stage 2 Delta Tour Zeeland
1st Stage 2 Bayern Rundfahrt
3rd Münsterland Giro
4th Overall Driedaagse van West-Vlaanderen

1st Stage 2

8th Trofeo Palma de Mallorca
8th Grote Prijs Stad Zottegem
2011
1st Road race, National Road Championships
3rd Le Samyn
3rd Grand Prix d'Isbergues
8th Trofeo Cala Millor
2013
1st Stage 1 (ITT) Ster ZLM Toer
6th Overall Tour des Fjords
6th Handzame Classic

=== Grand Tour general classification results timeline ===
Grand Tour	2011	2012	2013	2014	2015	2016	2017
Giro d'Italia	—	—	—	—	DNF	—	—
Tour de France	—	—	—	—	—	163	164
Vuelta a España	162	—	123	151	—	—	—

Legend
—	Did not compete
DNF	Did not finish
