= 2011 Giro di Lombardia =

Giro di Lombardia
2011 UCI World Tour, race 26 of 26
- Event poster

Race details
- Dates: 15 October 2011
- Stages: 1
- Distance: 241 km (149.8 mi)
- Winning time: 6h 20' 02"

Results
	Winner	Oliver Zaugg (Switzerland)	(Leopard Trek)
	Second	Dan Martin (Republic of Ireland)	(Garmin–Cervélo)
	Third	Joaquim Rodríguez (Spain)	(Team Katusha)

The 2011 Giro di Lombardia was the 105th edition of the Giro di Lombardia single-day cycling race, often known as the Race of the Falling Leaves. It was held on 15 October 2011, over a distance of 241 km (149.8 mi), starting in Milan and ending in Lecco for the first time. It was the 26th and final event of the 2011 UCI World Tour.

Leopard Trek rider Oliver Zaugg won the race, having attacked on the final climb of Salita di Ello and stayed away until the end, winning a race for the first time in his professional career. The remaining podium places were contested for – eight seconds behind Zaugg – in a five-man sprint for the line with Garmin–Cervélo's Dan Martin just besting Joaquim Rodríguez of Team Katusha for second place. The two-time defending race winner and World Tour points leader Philippe Gilbert finished in eighth position, 16 seconds down on Zaugg.

== Teams ==
As the race was held under the auspices of the UCI World Tour, all eighteen ProTour teams were invited automatically. Seven additional wildcard invitations were given – Acqua & Sapone, Androni Giocattoli, Colnago–CSF Inox, Farnese Vini–Neri Sottoli, FDJ, Geox–TMC and Team Europcar – to form the event's 25-team peloton.

- Acqua & Sapone
- Ag2r–La Mondiale
- Androni Giocattoli
- Astana
- BMC Racing Team
- Colnago–CSF Inox
- Euskaltel–Euskadi
- Farnese Vini–Neri Sottoli
- FDJ
- Garmin–Cervélo
- Geox–TMC
- HTC–Highroad
- Lampre–ISD
- Leopard Trek
- Liquigas–Cannondale
- Omega Pharma–Lotto
- Quick-Step
- Rabobank
- Saxo Bank–SunGard
- Team Europcar
- Team Katusha
- Movistar Team
- Team RadioShack
- Team Sky
- Vacansoleil–DCM

== Results ==
	Cyclist	Team	Time	UCI World Tour Points
1	Oliver Zaugg (SUI)	Leopard Trek	6h 20' 02"	100
2	Dan Martin (IRL)	Garmin–Cervélo	+ 8"	80
3	Joaquim Rodríguez (ESP)	Team Katusha	+ 8"	70
4	Ivan Basso (ITA)	Liquigas–Cannondale	+ 8"	60
5	Przemysław Niemiec (POL)	Lampre–ISD	+ 8"	50
6	Domenico Pozzovivo (ITA)	Colnago–CSF Inox	+ 8"	–
7	Giovanni Visconti (ITA)	Farnese Vini–Neri Sottoli	+ 16"	–
8	Philippe Gilbert (BEL)	Omega Pharma–Lotto	+ 16"	20
9	Carlos Betancur (COL)	Acqua & Sapone	+ 16"	–
10	Riccardo Chiarini (ITA)	Androni Giocattoli	+ 16"	–
