= Oliver Zaugg =

Swiss road bicycle racer

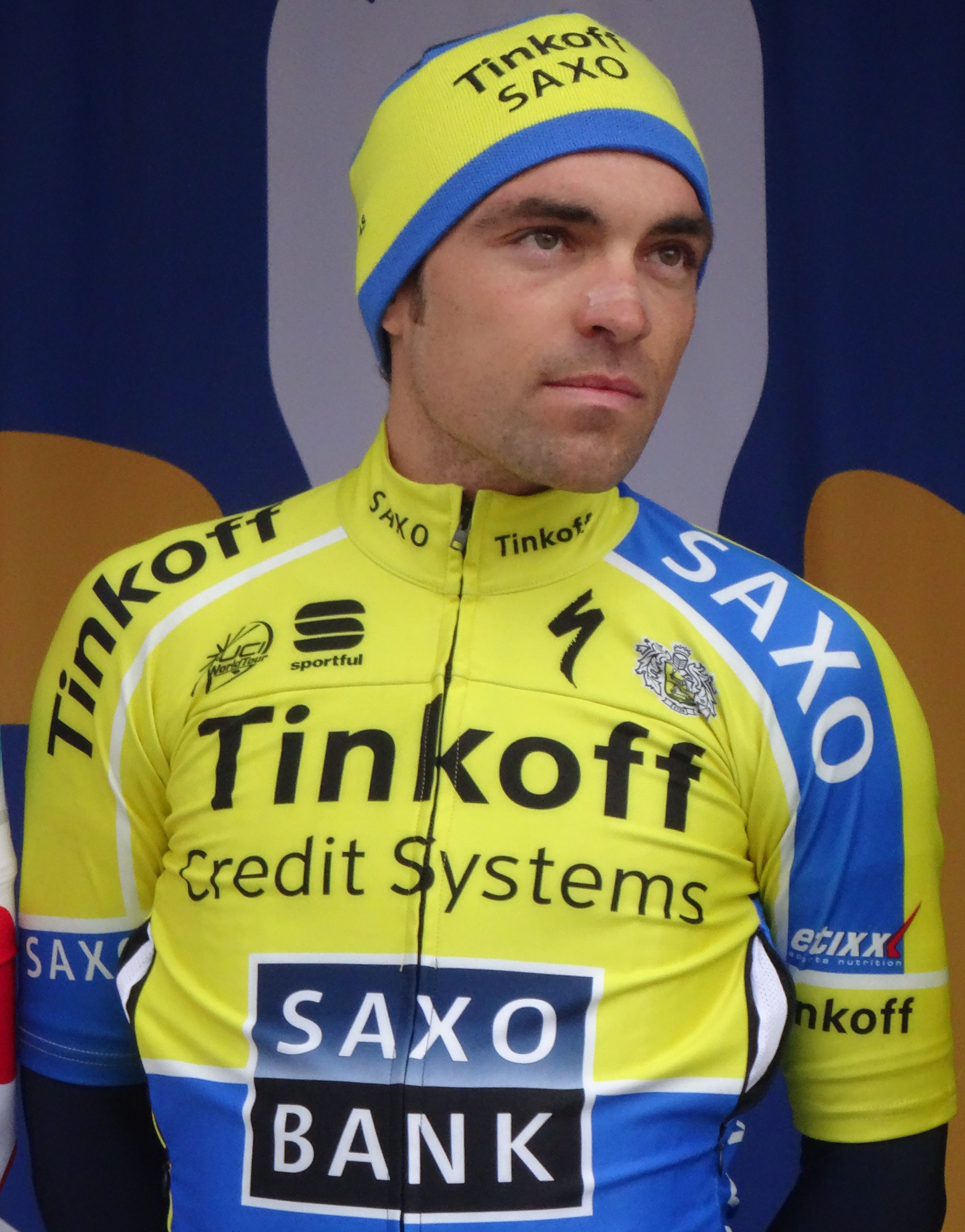
- Zaugg in 2014

Personal information
- Full name: Oliver Zaugg
- Born: 9 May 1981 (age 45) Lachen
- Height: 1.70 m (5 ft 7 in)
- Weight: 56 kg (123 lb)

Cycling career
- Sport: Cycling
- Current team: Retired
- Discipline: Road
- Role: Rider
- Rider type: Climbing specialist

Professional teams
- 2004–2006: Saunier Duval–Prodir
- 2007–2008: Gerolsteiner
- 2009–2010: Liquigas
- 2011–2012: Leopard Trek
- 2013–2015: Saxo–Tinkoff
- 2016: IAM Cycling

Major wins
- Grand Tours Vuelta a España 1 TTT stage (2011) One-day races and Classics Giro di Lombardia (2011)

Oliver Zaugg (born 9 May 1981) is a Swiss former professional road bicycle racer, who competed professionally between 2004 and 2016 for Saunier Duval–Prodir, Gerolsteiner, Liquigas–Doimo, RadioShack–Nissan, Tinkoff–Saxo and IAM Cycling.

== Career ==
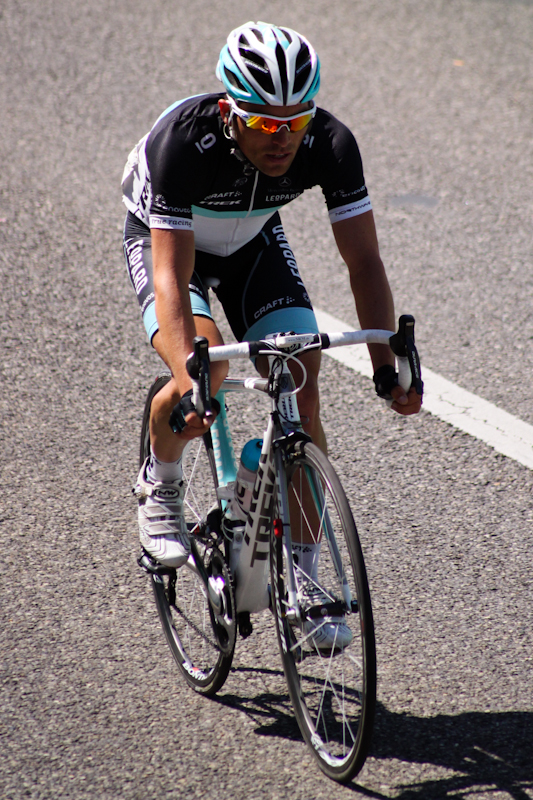
Zaugg in 2011

Zaugg won his first major race in 2011, the Giro di Lombardia. He attacked on the Villa Vergano climb with 10 kilometres (6.2 miles) to go, soloing on to victory. He was chased relentlessly by the leading group, but the chasers could not get to him. He crossed the finish line in Lecco with an advantage of 15 seconds over his nearest rival, Dan Martin of Garmin–Cervélo. In 2012, he tried to defend his title at the Giro di Lombardia, finishing in the chase group in eighth position as Joaquim Rodríguez (Team Katusha) claimed the victory.

Zaugg left RadioShack–Nissan at the end of the 2012 season, and signed with Saxo–Tinkoff for the 2013 season. After three seasons in October 2015, Zaugg agreed to join IAM Cycling for 2016. He ended his career at the 2016 Il Lombardia, a race he had previously won in 2011.

== Major results ==
1999
2nd Time trial, National Junior Road Championships
2003
6th Rund um den Henninger Turm U23
9th Gran Premio Palio del Recioto
2006
7th Overall Vuelta a Andalucía
8th Giro dell'Emilia
2008
5th GP Triberg-Schwarzwald
7th Memorial Cimurri
8th Grand Prix of Aargau Canton
2010
1st Stage 1b (TTT) Settimana Internazionale di Coppi e Bartali
4th Overall Vuelta a Burgos
2011 (1 pro win)
1st Giro di Lombardia
1st Stage 1 (TTT) Vuelta a España
8th Gran Premio Bruno Beghelli
9th Giro dell'Emilia
2012
8th Giro di Lombardia
2014
7th Overall Tour of Austria

=== Grand Tour general classification results timeline ===
Grand Tour	2004	2005	2006	2007	2008	2009	2010	2011	2012	2013	2014
Giro d'Italia	46	DNF	—	DNF	—	—	—	DNF	56	—	—
Tour de France	Did not contest during career										
Vuelta a España	—	—	—	15	11	70	50	DNF	—	37	23

=== Monuments results timeline ===
Monument	2004	2005	2006	2007	2008	2009	2010	2011	2012	2013	2014	2015	2016
Milan–San Remo	—	—	DNF	—	—	—	—	—	—	—	—	—	—
Tour of Flanders	Did not contest during career												
Paris–Roubaix	Did not contest during career												
Liège–Bastogne–Liège	103	DNF	—	92	26	—	—	—	—	111	—	—	142
Giro di Lombardia	—	—	28	20	—	18	—	1	8	—	63	—	DNF

Legend
—	Did not compete
DNF	Did not finish
