= Delta Tour Zeeland =

Annual road bicycle stage race

Race details
- Date: June
- Region: Zeeland, Netherlands
- Local name(s): Delta Tour Zeeland (in Dutch)
- Discipline: Road
- Competition: UCI Europe Tour
- Type: Stage race
- Web site: tacxproclassic.nl

History
- First edition: 2008
- Editions: 4
- Final edition: 2011
- First winner: Christopher Sutton (AUS)
- Most wins: Tyler Farrar (USA) (2)
- Final winner: Marcel Kittel (GER)

Delta Tour Zeeland was a road bicycle stage race held annually in June in Zeeland, Netherlands. In 2008, the race was organized as a 2.1 event on the UCI Europe Tour as the organizers of the one-day race Delta Profronde and of the OZ Wielerweekend operated a fusion to create the stage race. The first winner of the race was the Australian Christopher Sutton and the last was German Marcel Kittel.

In 2012, it was renamed Ronde van Zeeland Seaports, coming back to its one-day race roots with a 1.1 ranking on the UCI Europe Tour.

== Winners ==
Year	Country	Rider	Team
2008	Australia	Christopher Sutton	Slipstream–Chipotle
2009	United States	Tyler Farrar	Garmin–Slipstream
2010	United States	Tyler Farrar	Garmin–Transitions
2011	Germany	Marcel Kittel	Skil–Shimano
