= London to Brighton Veteran Car Run =

Annual automobile-driving event in England

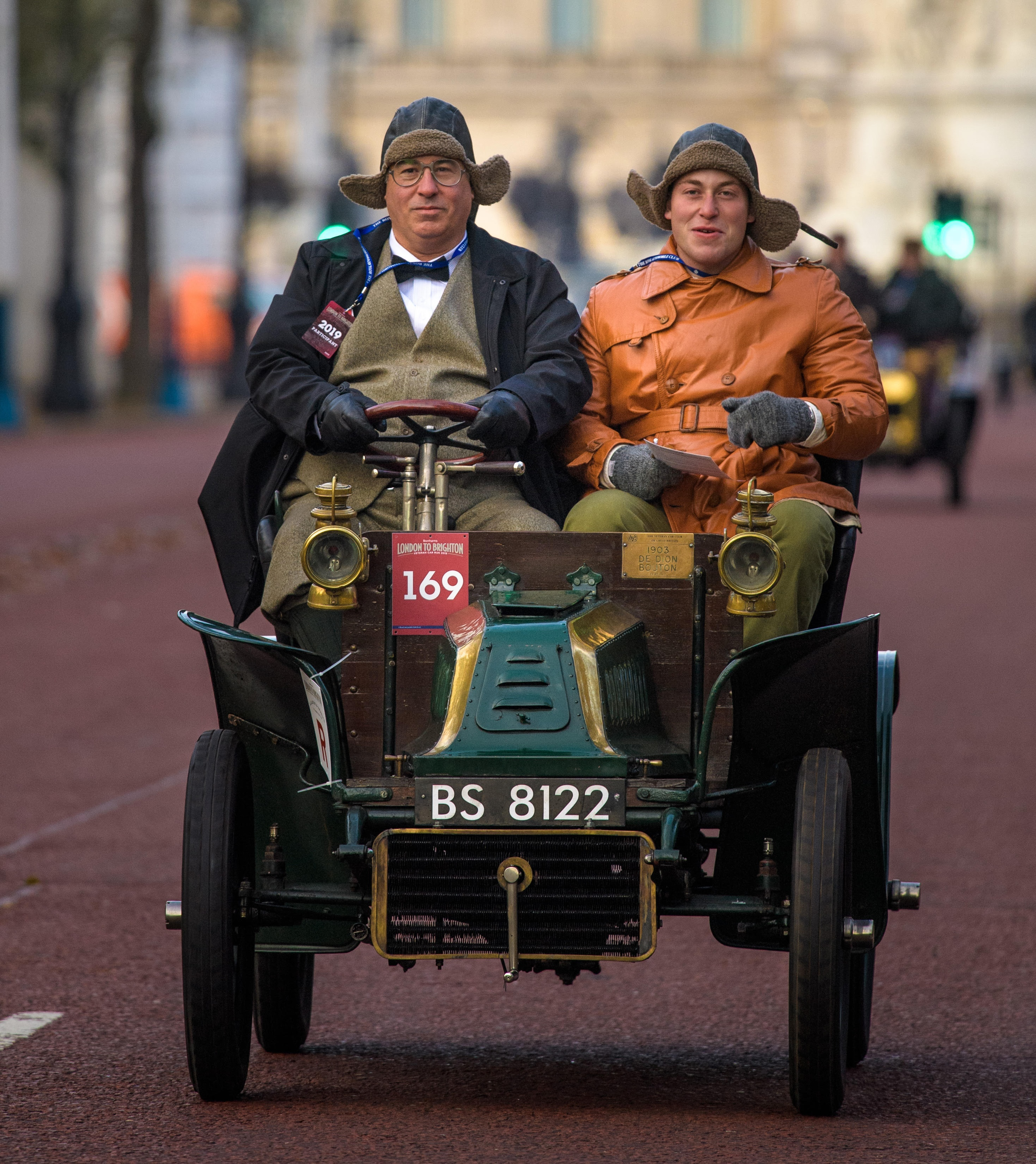
1903 De Dion Bouton Model Q

The London to Brighton Veteran Car Run is the world's longest-running motoring event, held on a course between London (51°30′31″N 00°09′49″W) and Brighton (50°49′42″N 00°08′22″W), England. To qualify, participating cars must have been built before 1905. It is also the world's largest gathering of veteran cars. (Note: 443 cars started the event in 2005, and 484 in 2009, compared to 37 starters in 1927, 51 starters in 1930, and 131 in 1938.) The first edition, "The Emancipation Run" in 1896, celebrated the recently passed Locomotives on Highways Act 1896, which liberalised motor vehicle laws in the United Kingdom.

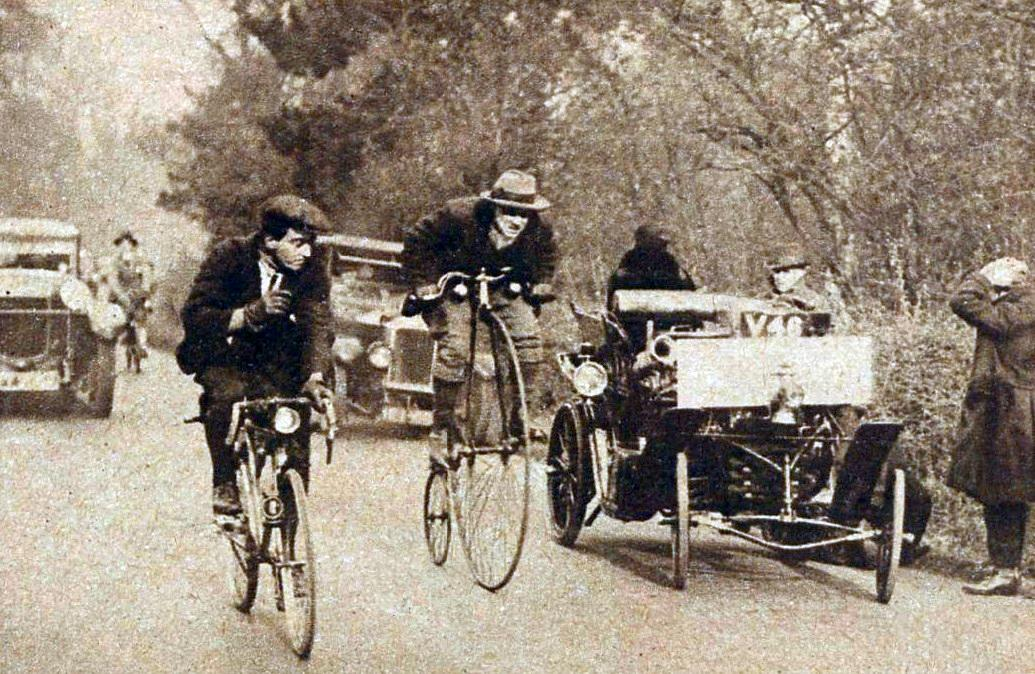
The first run, in November 1927, only for vehicles over thirty years old.

The run has taken place most years since its initial revival in 1927. It currently takes place on the first Sunday in November, starting at sunrise, about 7:00 AM, in Hyde Park, London, and mostly following the old A23 road to the finish at Brighton – a distance of 54 mi (87 km). There is one official stops along the way: Crawley (for coffee) and Preston Park (in a suburb of Brighton). Preston Park is the official finishing point; the cars then proceed to Madeira Drive on the seafront, the venue for Brighton's Official Finishing Point.

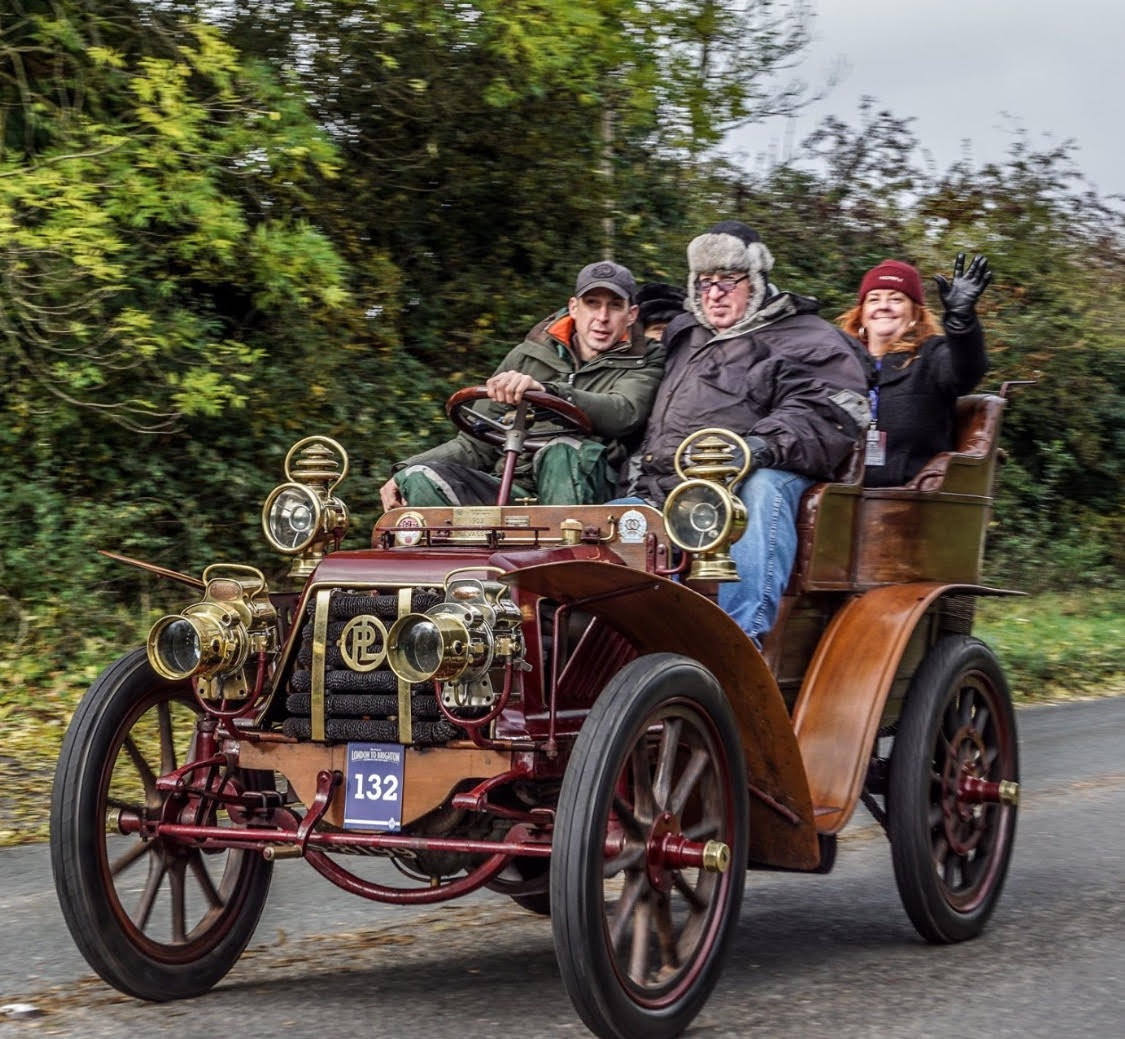
Pre-1905 London to Brighton Rally automobile: 1902 Panhard et Levassor

The event is organized on behalf of the Royal Automobile Club, who emphasise that the event is not a race – they do not even publish the order in which cars finish, and participants are not permitted to exceed an average speed of 20 mph (32 km/h). Any that finish before 4:30 PM are awarded a medal.

There are a few other events preceding the Veteran Car Run, such as the Motoring Forum, the Veteran Car Run Sale, a motor show, and a participant reception.

== 1896 Emancipation Run ==
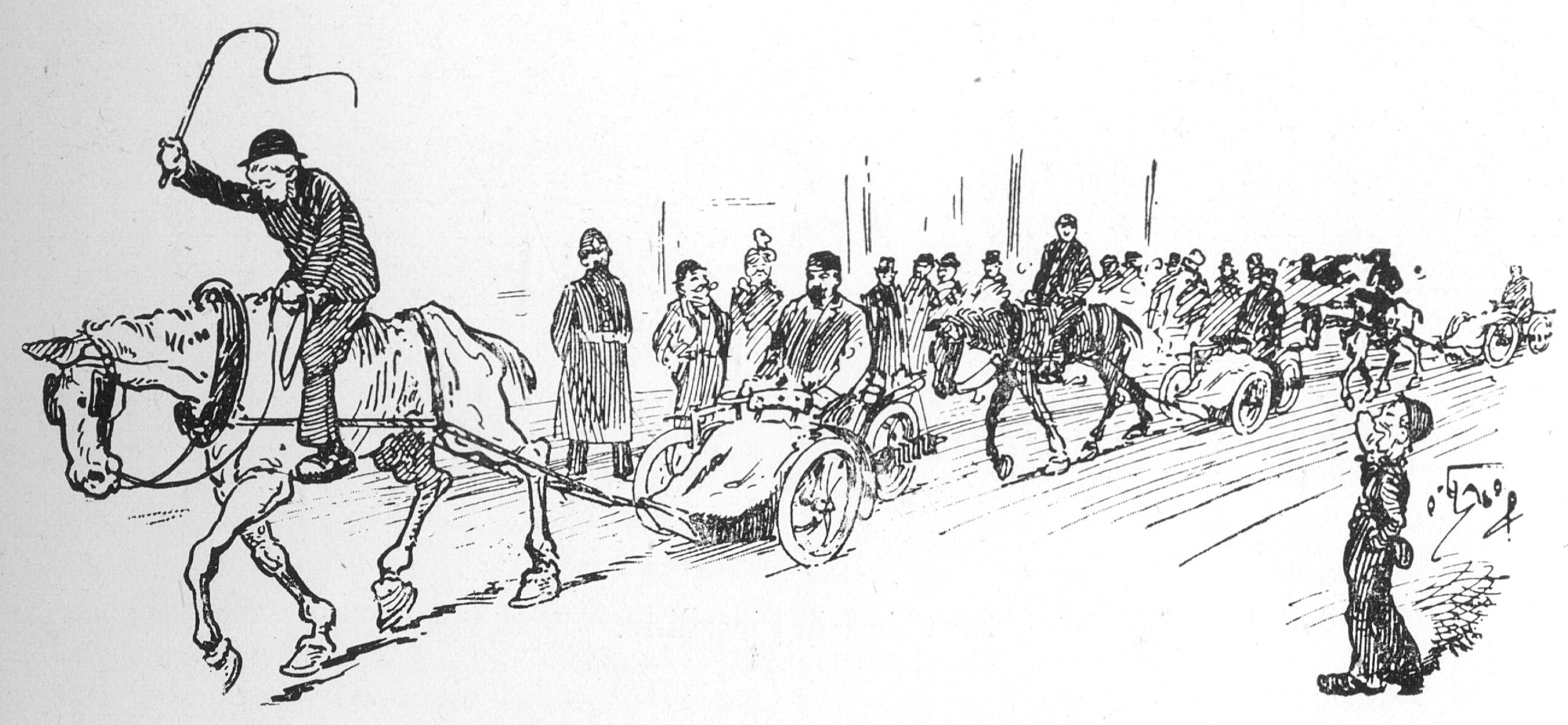
Bollée tandems under tow from Victoria to Holborn, London, 12 November 1896, to take part in the Emancipation Run

The first run took place on 14 November 1896, a wet Saturday. Organised by Harry John Lawson, it was named "The Emancipation Run" as a celebration of the recently passed Locomotives on Highways Act 1896, which had exempted motor vehicles weighing less than 3 tons unladen from the restrictive Locomotive Acts of 1861, 1865 and 1878 and increased the speed limit to 14 mph (23 km/h). Since 1865 the speed limit had been 4 mph (6.4 km/h) in the country and 2 mph (3.2 km/h) in the town with a man required to walk 20 yd (18 m) ahead of the vehicle to assist riders and drivers of horses. The run was also the first meet of the Motor Car Club, of which Lawson was president.

As well as being a celebration, Lawson planned the event to promote his British Motor Syndicate and its patents, most of which had been acquired from French and German companies. His Commercial Manager, the fluent French speaker H.O.Duncan, arranged for the appearance of the Bollée brothers and several Panhard & Levassor cars, with their drivers, including the winners of notable races. However, Count de Dion refused to participate, smarting at having been paid half his fee for his patent rights in shares of the Syndicate, which he considered worthless. Frederick Simms prevailed on his friend, Gottlieb Daimler to attend.

The event started with a breakfast at the Charing Cross Hotel, which included the symbolic tearing in two by Lord Winchelsea of a red flag. The organisers of the Emancipation Run had made much of their claim that the man who walked ahead had to carry a red flag. The 1865 Act had imposed this requirement but the 1878 Act had lifted it. The Bollée brothers had fallen foul of other provisions in the Acts and had had to be towed by horses from Victoria Station to Holborn, two days before the restrictions were lifted.

The participants gathered outside the Metropole Hotel (now the Corinthia Hotel London), with the cars accompanied by a "flying escort" – estimated by one witness as "probably 10,000" – of pedal cyclists, recreational cycling having become popular with the English in the final decades of the 19th century. A total of 33 motorists set off from London for the coast and 17 arrived in Brighton. The first of the cars set off from London at 10:30 am. The first to arrive in Brighton was a Duryea Motor Wagon, which beat Léon Bollée on his racing tricar by half an hour. Two Duryea cars participated in the run, marking the first appearance of American motor vehicles in Europe. Louise Bazalgette, one of the earliest women motorists in Britain, was photographed at the start of the event on an Arnold motor car, with her friend Henry Hewetson.

== 1896 results ==
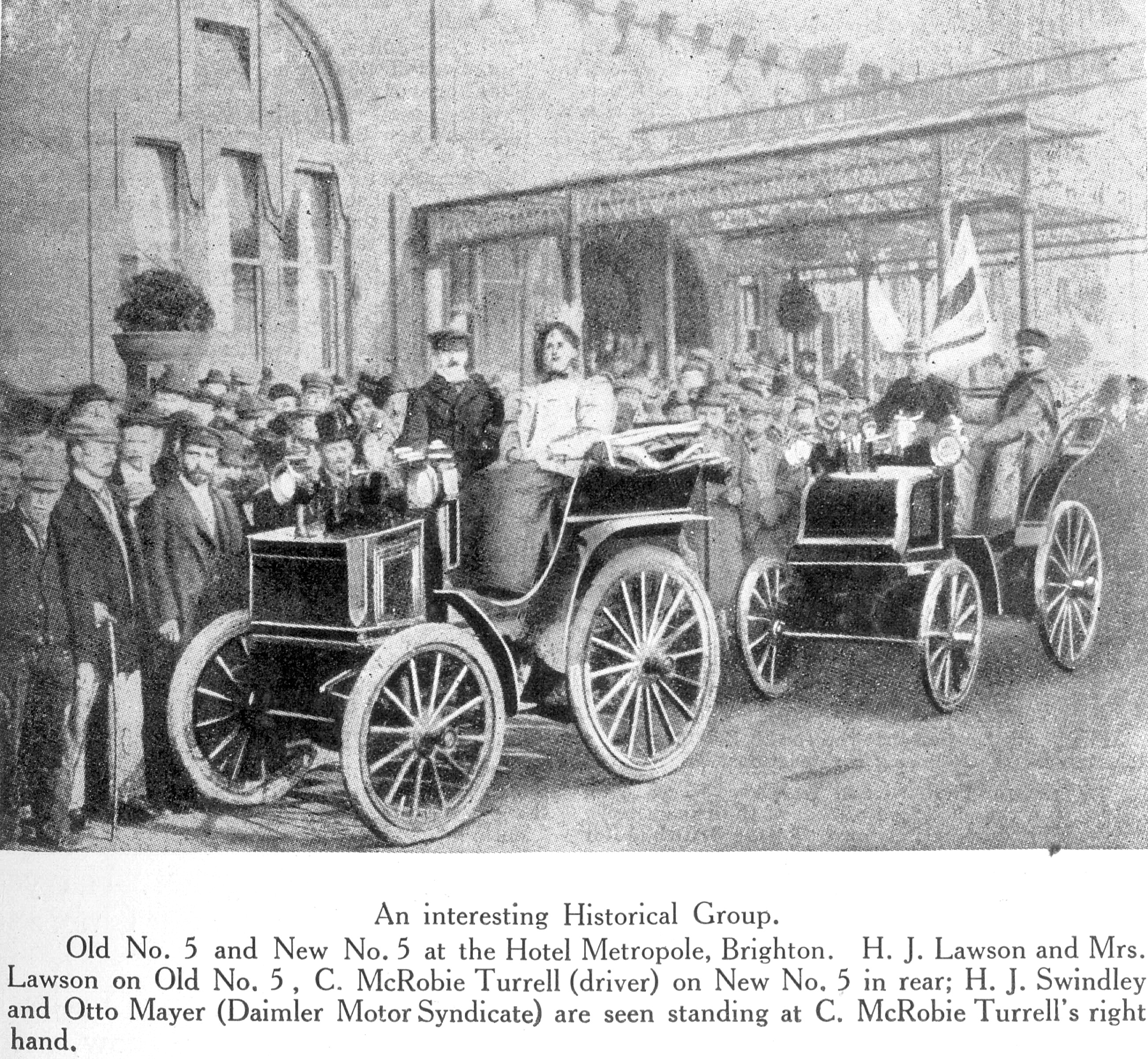
Participants in the Emancipation Run at the Hotel Metropole, Brighton, 14 November 1896

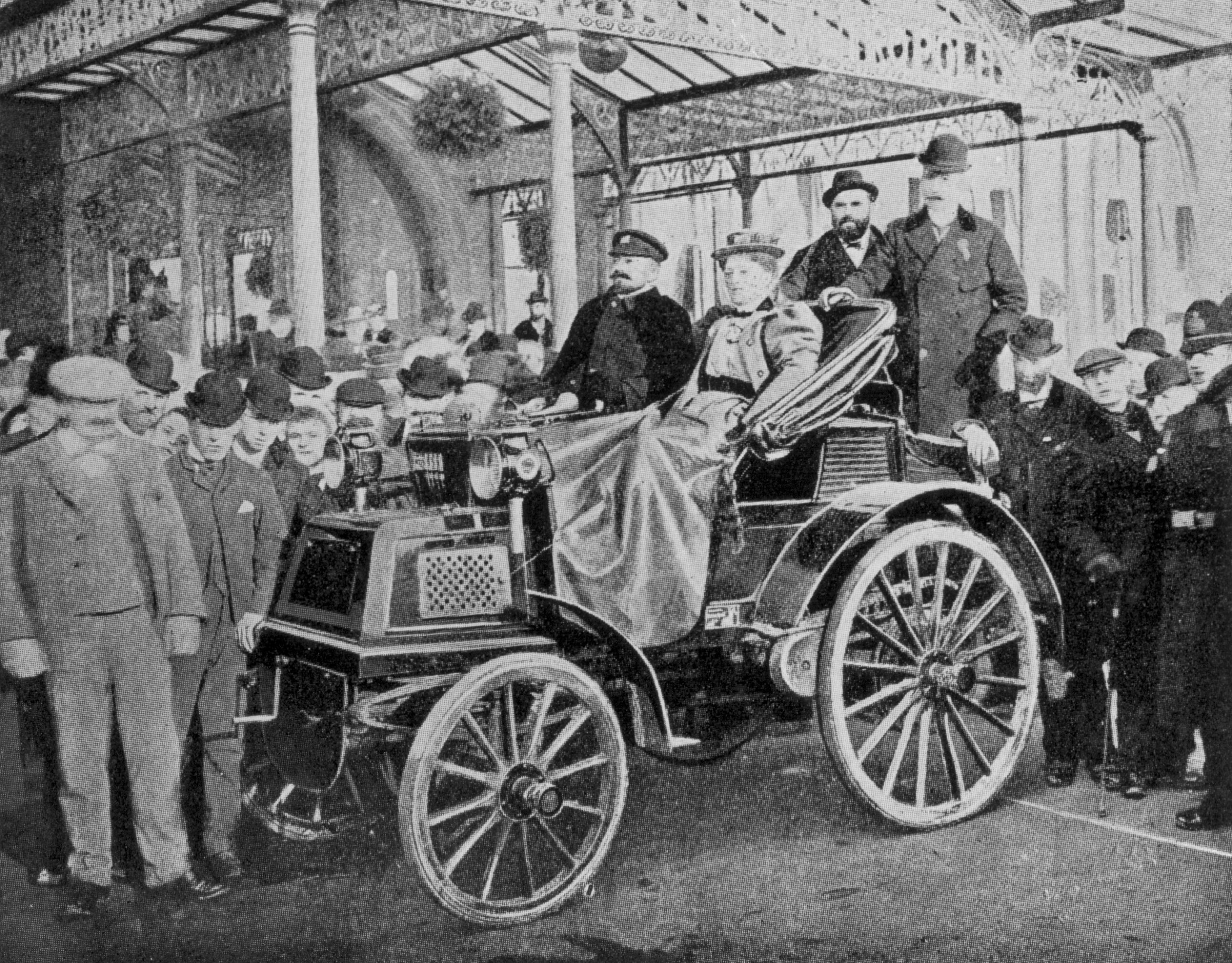
Émile Mayade on Panhard No. 6 at the Hotel Metropole, Brighton, 14 November 1896

The event was organised as a procession, but some approached it as a race. The official result of the fastest finishers was:

	Official Result		Additional Data			
Rank	Vehicle/Driver	Time hours:m:s	Driver	Manufacturer	Type	Note
1	Léon Bollée	3:44:35	Léon Bollée	Léon Bollée Automobiles	6 hp racing tricycle, tandem 2-seater, petrol	The Bollée brothers drove their 6hp twin-cylinder racing tandems; the other Bollée tandem was the single-cylinder version
2	Camille Bollée	4:00:20	Camille Bollée	Léon Bollée Automobiles	6 hp racing tricycle, tandem 2-seater, petrol	The Bollée brothers drove their 6hp twin-cylinder racing tandems; the other Bollée tandem was the single-cylinder version
3.	Panhard Wagonette No. 8	5:01:10	Lord Winchelsea	Panhard & Levassor	4 hp, 1896, 4 seat, oil	The vehicle finished second in the Paris-Marseilles race, 1895
4.	Lawson's Landau	6:07:30	Oscar Meyer	Panhard & Levassor	4 hp, 1895, 2 seat, petrol	Harry Lawson was a passenger.
5.	Panhard dog-cart No. 6	6:08:15	Emile Mayade	Panhard & Levassor	8 hp, 1896, phaeton 4 seater, petrol	Mayade won the Paris-Marseilles race in 1895 on this vehicle.
6.	Sherrin's electric bath-chair	6:12:10	Sherrin	Britannia Motor Carriage Co	bath-chair, 1 seat, electric	
7.	Daimler Phaeton	6:12:25		Daimler		
8.	Pennington's tricycle	6:17:00	E.J. Pennington	Pennington	4 seater tricycle	
9.	Bersey's electric landau	6:19:40	Walter Bersey	Universal Electric Carriage Co	6 passenger seats + double-seat for driver	
10.	Panhard	6:22:00		Panhard & Levassor		

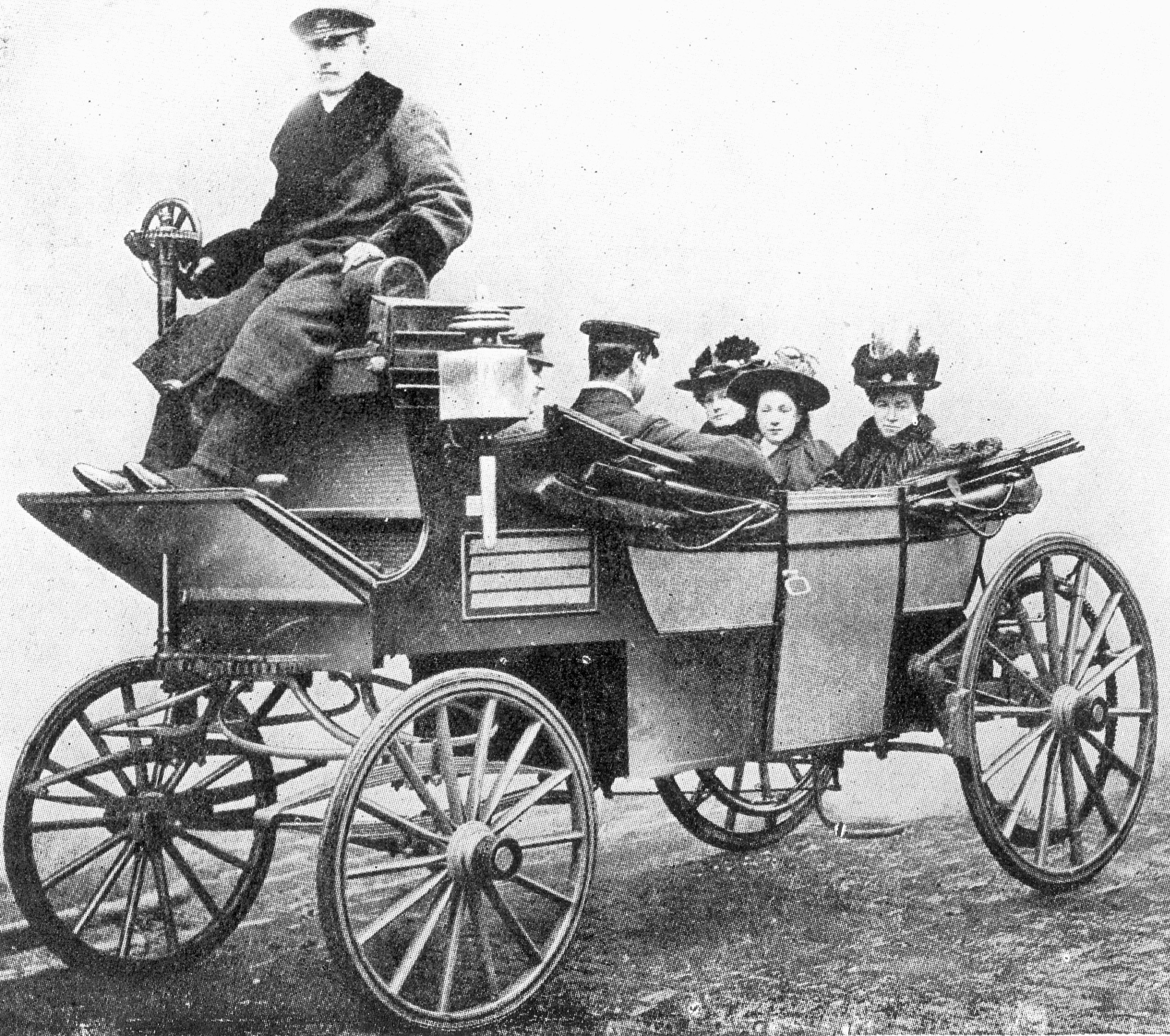
Walter Bersey with his party on his Electric Landau which took part in the Emancipation Run 1896

At least two of these must be regarded as dubious: H.O.Duncan (who drove the third Bollée tricar, which did not finish) wrote:

It is quite possible that the electric vehicles―Sherrin's bath-chair and Bersey's electric landau― were sent by train. I quite fail to believe that at that period any accumlator was capable of driving an electric vehicle a distance of over 50 miles at a stretch!!

=== Performance of the Duryea Cars ===
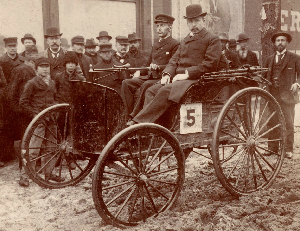
Frank Duryea driving his car at the start of the Chicago Times-Herald race, 28 Nov 1895

Although one of the Duryea cars had been witnessed arriving in Brighton half an hour before Léon Bollée, both of them were omitted from the official result. Some attributed this to Lawson's not having bought any patents from Duryea, and so having no interest in promoting their vehicles. H.O.Duncan wrote:

Although it was said that two American Duryea cars were the first to arrive in Brighton, there seems to be some doubt about this. It is rather strange we never heard anything about these cars officially or unofficially before the event!! Whether they arrived by train or slipped in somewhere on the road, no one seems to know―and the mystery has never been solved.

Duryea's most notable previous success had been the Chicago Times-Herald Race in 1895. This had been conducted in a snow storm and neither of the cars which finished had stuck to the course. Most of the difference between Duryea's elapsed and running times was incurred in two stops for repairs, each requiring the use of a forge. In the earlier Exhibition Run, he had led initially before having another stop at a forge and then crashing out. His results were:

Date	Event	Distance (miles)	Weather	Time	Average Speed (mph)
	Chicago Times-Herald:				
2 Nov 1895	Chicago – Waukegan – Chicago	100	Hot	Did not finish	<15 (Note: Average speed is upper limit before crashing out at Prairie View (39 miles) having failed to catch up with Oscar Mueller's Benz (elapsed time for 100 miles = 9h. 30m; running time = 8h. 44m). Duryea had a 48-minute stoppage after a broken chain. Assumes Mueller travelled continuously at his average running speed from start to Prairie View.)
28 Nov 1895	Chicago – Evanston – Chicago	54	Snow storm	10:23 (elapsed)	5.2
28 Nov 1895	Chicago – Evanston – Chicago	54	Snow storm	7:53 (running)	6.8
30 May 1896	Cosmopolitan Magazine: NY City – Irvington – NY City	62		7:13	8.6
14 Nov 1896	London – Brighton	54	Wet and windy	3:15	16.6

Mayade had won the 1896 Paris-Marseille-Paris race at an average speed of 15.6 mph, so his average speed of 8.8 mph on the same vehicle in the Emancipation Run indicates that he was not racing. The Bollée brothers' tricars were special twin-cylinder racing versions, not the standard single-cylinder version, but they carried an observer on the front seat (nicknamed le tue belle-mère), so they had to temper their speed.

The Emancipation Run was meant to be a procession. If the Duryeas had been following the course, they would have had to overtake the Bollée brothers. Had they done so, the brothers would probably have given chase; they would certainly have told Duncan afterwards. The absence of such reports reduces the credibility of the Duryeas' claims.

== Subsequent runs ==
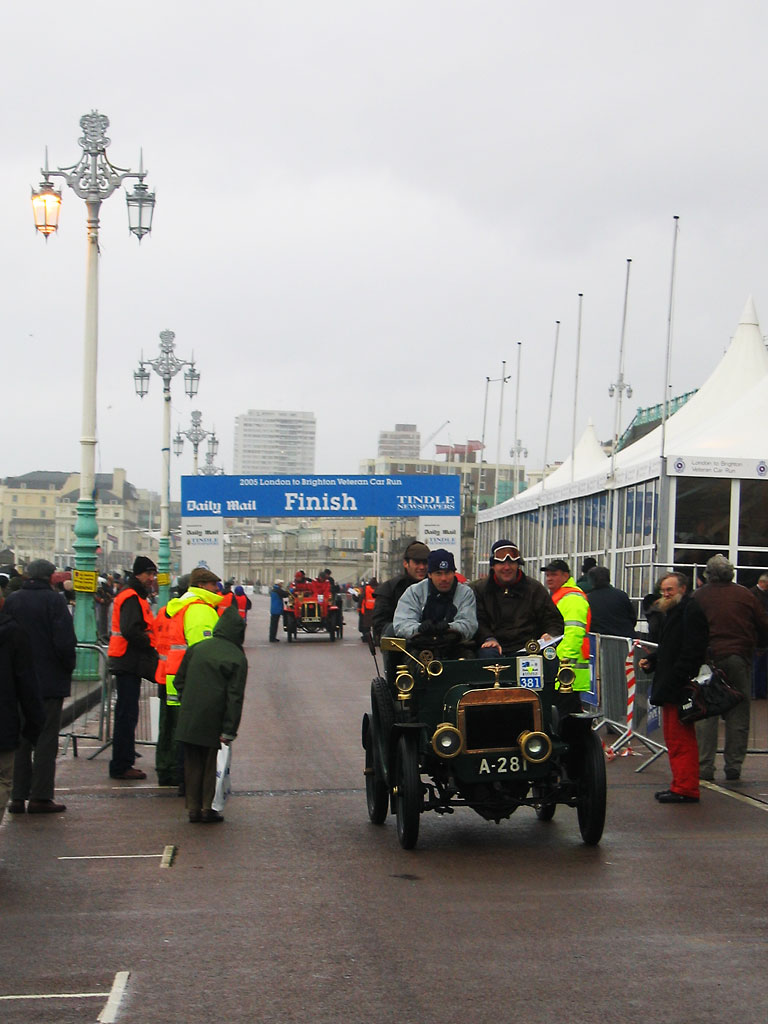
Finish line of the London to Brighton Veteran Car Run, 2005

During the next few years, Commemoration Run took place between Whitehall Place and Sheen House Club covering the distance of about 8 mi (13 km). The London to Brighton run was not staged again until 1927. Since then it has run annually, except from the onset of the Second World War up to 1947 owing to petrol rationing, and in 2020 due to the COVID-19 pandemic. With all this considered, it is the world's longest running motoring event. Since 1930, the event has been controlled by the Royal Automobile Club (RAC).

== Participants ==
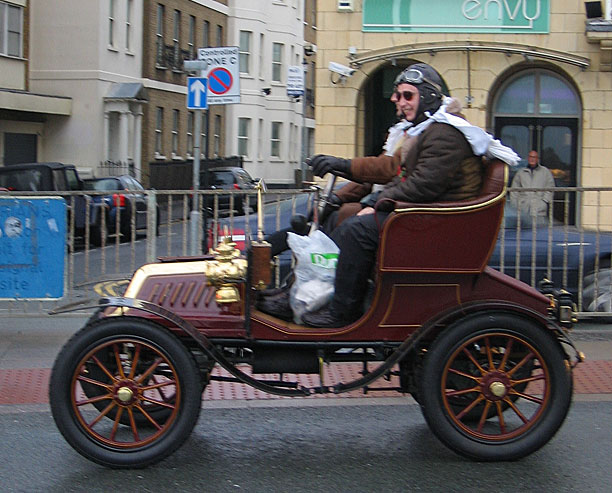
A veteran car nearing the end of the 2005 run in inclement weather

Many racing drivers and celebrities have taken part in the event, including Richard Shuttleworth (1928–1934; 1936–1938), S. C. H. "Sammy" Davis, Sir Malcolm Campbell, Prince Bira, George Eyston, Richard Seaman, Kaye Don, George Formby, Phil Hill, Stirling Moss, Jochen Mass, Nigel Mansell and Damon Hill

The 72nd anniversary run took place in 1968 and was joined by celebrity participants Prince Rainier and Princess Grace of Monaco, in a 1903 De Dion-Bouton. That year Stirling Moss also participated, driving a 1903 four-cylinder Mercedes.

Some participants dress up in a late Victorian or Edwardian style of clothing. In 1971 Queen Elizabeth II was a passenger in a 1900 Daimler. A regular participant is Prince Michael of Kent.

== RAC Brighton to London Future Car Challenge ==
In 2010 the RAC launched the Brighton to London Future Car Challenge, following the same route as the veteran car run, but starting in Brighton and finishing at Regent Street, London – and taking place on the day prior to the veteran run. The event is intended to showcase low energy impact vehicles of various technologies – Electric, Hybrid and Low-Emission ICE (internal combustion engine). Participants compete to minimise energy consumption using "road legal" vehicles in "real world" conditions.

The results of the inaugural 2010 event showed that the electric vehicles used the least energy (0.62 MJ/km (950 BTU/mi) on average, or 141 mpg_{‑imp} (2.00 L/100 km; 117 mpg_{‑US}) petrol equivalent), compared to the hybrid vehicles (1.14 MJ/km (1,740 BTU/mi) average, 76 mpg_{‑imp} (3.7 L/100 km; 63 mpg_{‑US}) petrol equivalent) and the largely diesel powered internal combustion engine vehicles (1.68 MJ/km (2,560 BTU/mi) average, 52 mpg_{‑imp} (5.4 L/100 km; 43 mpg_{‑US}) petrol equivalent).

== In popular culture ==
- The 1953 comedy film Genevieve is set during one of these runs.
- An episode of ChuckleVision, "Wheels of Misfortune", first aired on 15 January 1997, is set during one of these runs.
- In the 100th episode of Wheeler Dealers, Mike Brewer and Edd China restored a 1903 Darracq, borrowed from the Haynes International Motor Museum, to working order and drove it in the veteran car.

== See also ==
- London to Brighton events
