= The Coventry Motor Company =

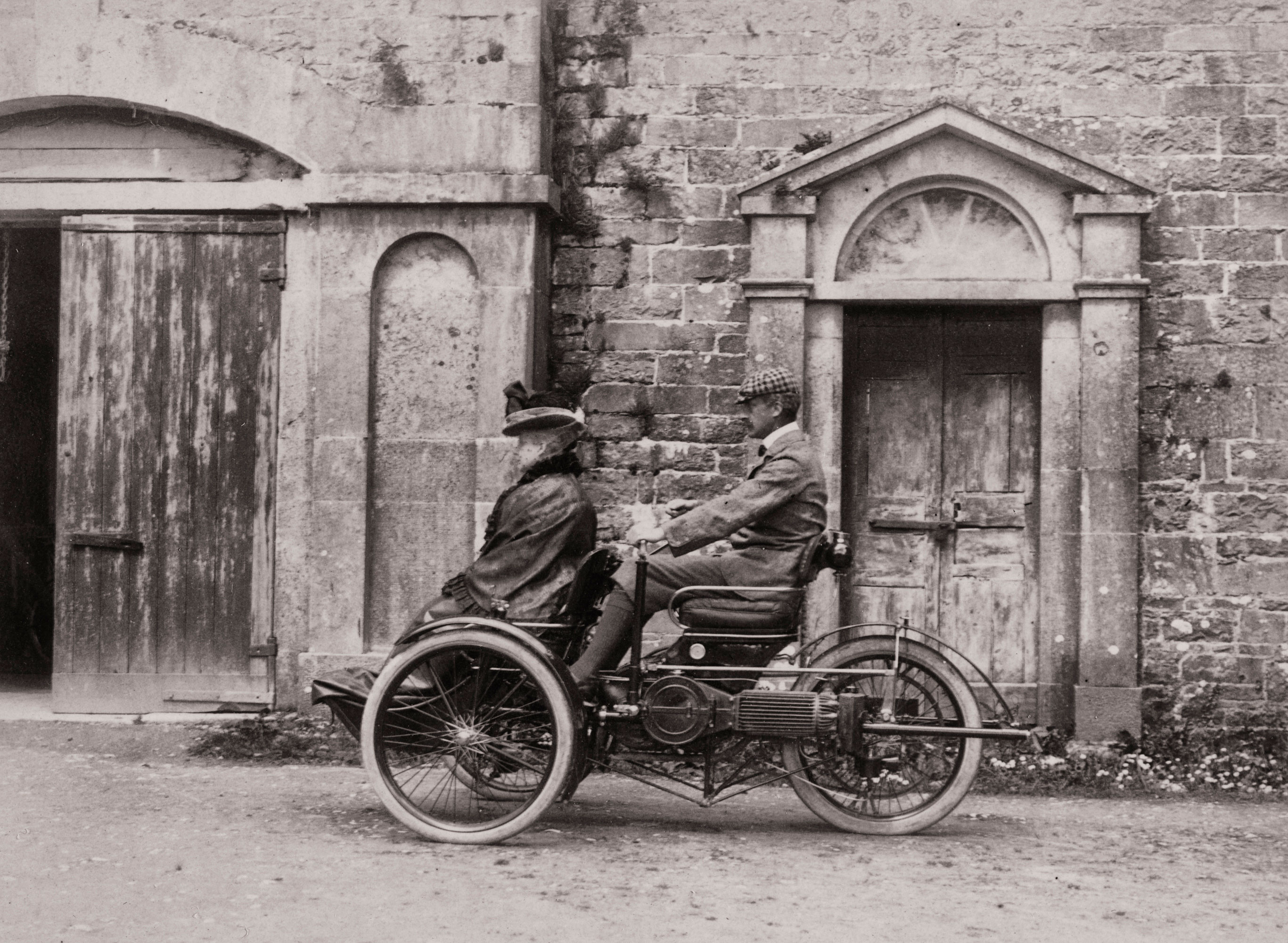
Turrell-Bollée about 1899

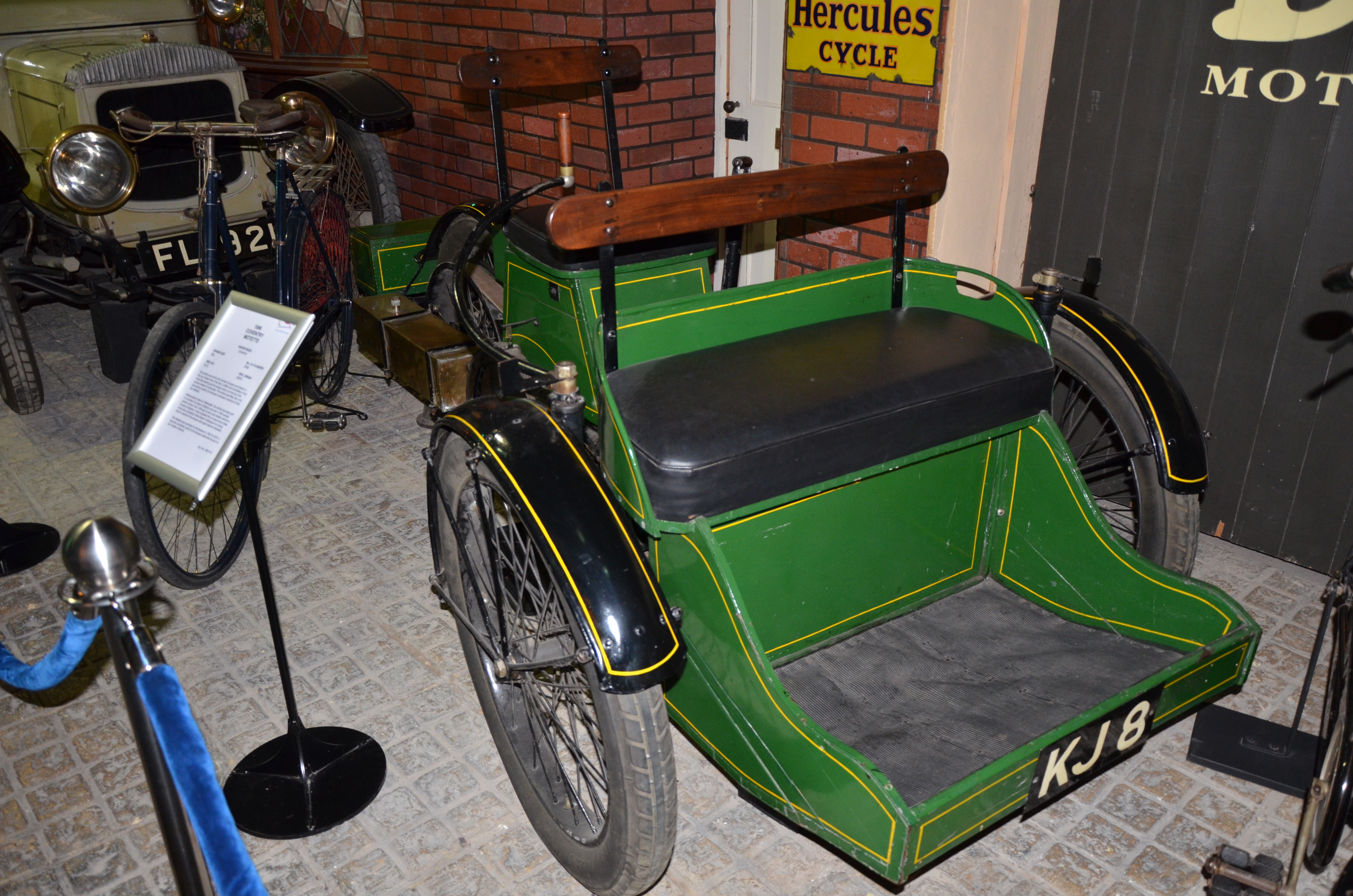
Coventry Motette in the Coventry Motor Museum

The Coventry Motor Company or CMC was a Coventry motor vehicle manufacturer established in early 1896 by H J Lawson's secretary Charles McRobie Turrell (1875–1923) as a subsidiary of Lawson's British Motor Syndicate.

It operated from the former cotton mills of Coventry Spinning and Weaving Company off Sandy Lane, Radford, which then housed The Daimler Motor Company, The Great Horseless Carriage Company (from 1898 The Motor Manufacturing Company) and The New Beeston Cycle Company.

The Coventry Motor Company produced in 1898 the Coventry Motette, a 3½ hp tricar with a single-cylinder engine, a modified version of the Léon Bollée tricar. These cars were also built, under licence, on those premises in the early years by staff of Humber and Company who had been rehoused there after the Humber works was damaged by fire.

The business was also operated from addresses at Parkside and Conduit Yard off Spon Street. A Mrs H De Veulle drove an example from Coventry to London to show that it could be handled by a woman and to show its reliability.

It ceased to trade around 1903.

== See also ==
- List of car manufacturers of the United Kingdom
