= Harry John Lawson =

British cyclist and industrialist

Henry John Lawson, also known as Harry Lawson, (23 February 1852–12 July 1925) was a British bicycle designer, racing cyclist, motor industry pioneer, and fraudster. As part of his attempt to create and control a British motor industry, Lawson formed and co-floated The Daimler Motor Company Limited in London in 1896. It later began to manufacture in Coventry. Lawson organised the 1896 Emancipation Day drive, now commemorated annually by the London to Brighton Veteran Car Run, running over the same course.

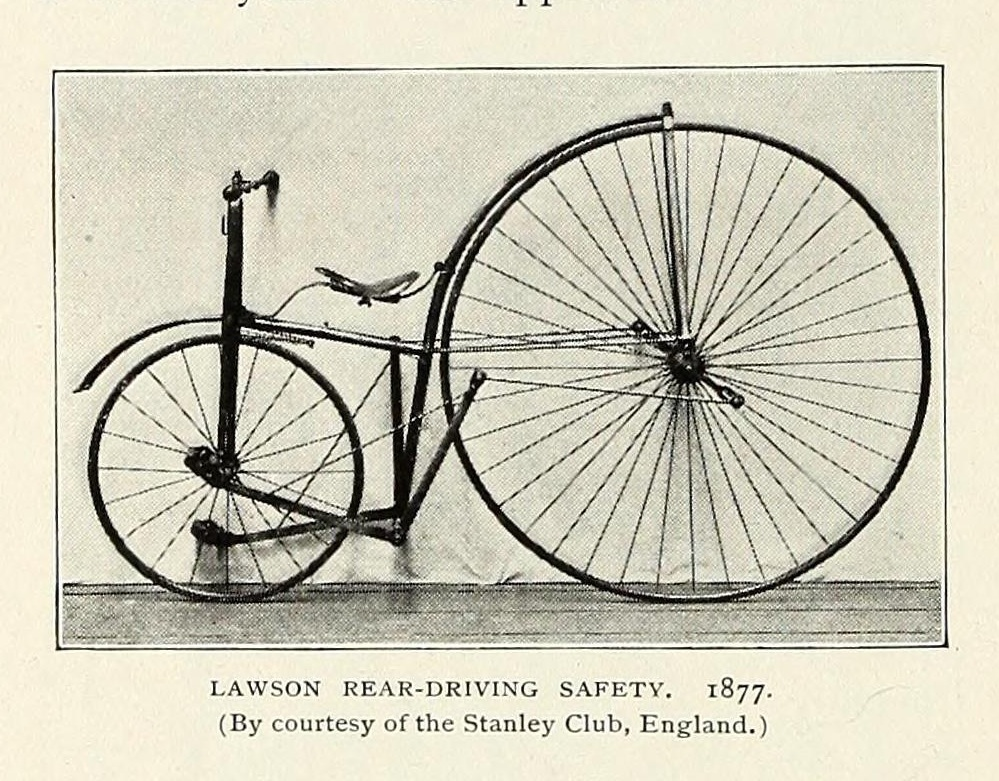
Lawson's rear-driving Safety, 1877

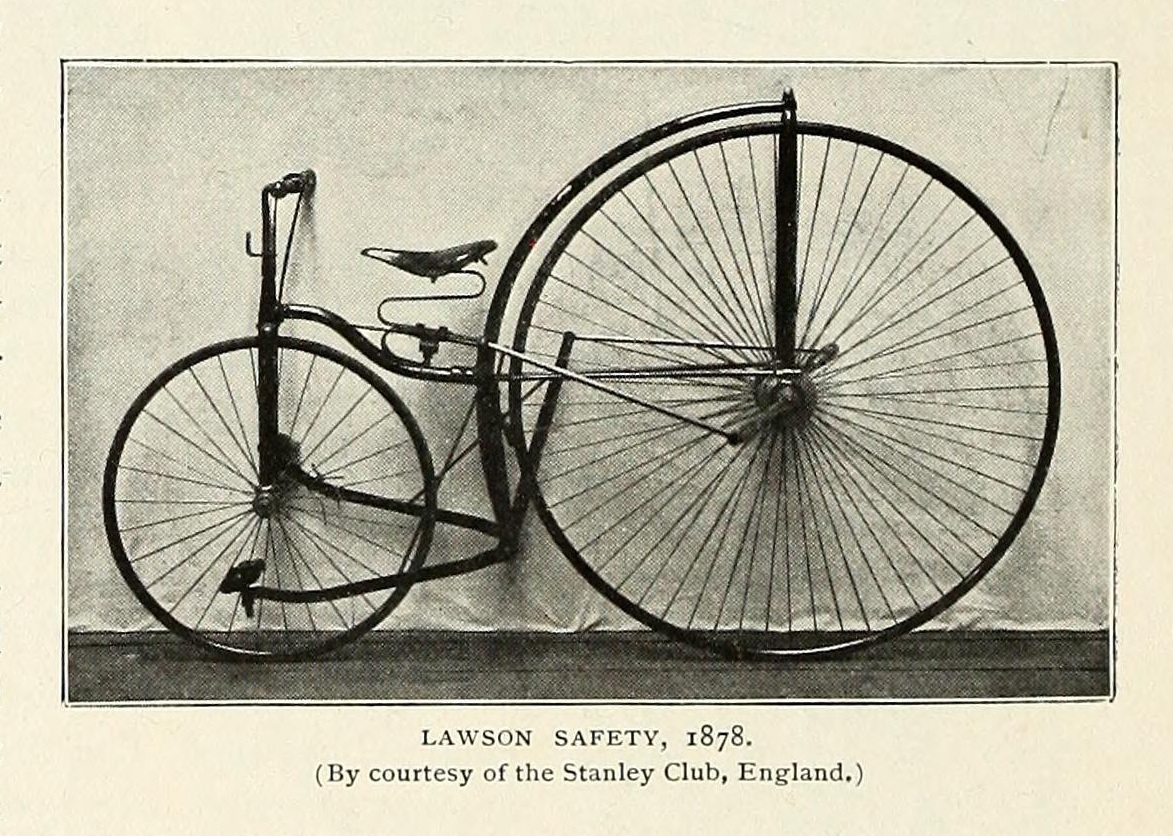
Lawson's Safety, 1878

Lawson's bicycle, 1879

== Early years ==
Lawson was born on 23 February 1852, in the City of London, the son of Thomas Lawson, a Calvinistic Methodist minister and brass turner, and his wife Anne Lucy Kent.

In 1873, the family moved to Brighton and Lawson designed several types of bicycle. His efforts were described as the "first authentic design of safety bicycle employing chain-drive to the rear wheel which was actually made" and he has been ranked alongside John Kemp Starley as an inventor of the modern bicycle.

In 1879, he married Elizabeth Olliver (b.1850) in Brighton. They had four children, two sons and two daughters.

In the early 1880s he moved to Coventry.

== Motor promoter ==
Lawson saw great opportunities in the creation of a motor car industry in Britain and sought to enrich himself by garnering important patents and shell companies. In 1895, as one of many attempts to promote his schemes and lobby Parliament for the elimination of the Red Flag Act, Lawson and Frederick Simms founded the Motor Car Club of Britain.

Lawson and the Motor Car Club organised the first London to Brighton car run, the "Emancipation Run", which was held on 14 November 1896 to celebrate the relaxation of the Locomotives Act 1865 (the Red Flag Act), which eased the way for the start of the development of the British motor industry.

Lawson attempted to monopolise the British automobile industry through the acquisition of foreign patents. He acquired exclusive British rights to manufacture De Dion-Bouton and Bollée vehicles. He founded a succession of promotional companies including: The British Motor Syndicate (BMS) — not to be confused with British Automobile Commercial Syndicate Limited. In 1897, BMS was the first of many of Lawson's schemes to collapse. Lawson also founded British Motor Company, British Motor Traction Company, The Great Horseless Carriage Company, Motor Manufacturing Company, and, with E. J. Pennington, formed the Anglo-American Rapid Vehicle Company.

With his one great success, The Daimler Motor Company Limited, he bought in the rights of Gottlieb Daimler, though that company too was reorganised in 1904. After a succession of business failures, the British Motor Syndicate was reorganised and renamed British Motor Traction Company in 1901, led by Selwyn F. Edge.

== Legal problems ==
Many of Lawson's patents were not as defining as he had hoped and, from 1901, a series of legal cases saw the value in his holdings shrink. Lawson's patent rights were subsequently eroded through successful lawsuits by the Automobile Mutual Protective Association. In 1904, Lawson, along with Ernest Terah Hooley, was tried in court for fraudulently obtaining money from his shareholders and, after representing himself in court, he was found guilty and sentenced to one year's hard labour.

Lawson was completely out of the automobile industry by 1908 and disappeared from the public gaze for some years. He reappeared as a director of Blériot Manufacturing Aircraft Company Ltd., the English branch of Louis Blériot's aircraft company. Lawson secretly acquired control of the company just before a public subscription, to help expand its efforts during the First World War, but the company soon found itself in breach of its contract with Blériot. When that came to light, the company was wound up and its director found guilty of fraud and dishonesty.

In March 1916, Lawson survived being torpedoed on the ferry "Sussex" while crossing the English Channel.

Lawson retired from the public gaze and died at his home in Harrow, London on 12 July 1925 aged 73. After his death, Herbert Osbaldeston Duncan, former Commercial Manager of his British Motor Syndicate, described him thus:
"He was neither a greedy man nor an egoist. On the contrary he was always fair and extremely generous. He paid largely and was most liberal in the golden days of his success. A cheque was always ready to be handed over with a kindly smile to friends who assisted him with his dealings or company-promoting schemes. Lawson was a clever man. Perhaps his greatest misfortune was in not being supported properly in his business by others equally intelligent." (Duncan, Herbert Osbaldeston The World on Wheels, thrilling true tales of the Cycle & Automobile Industry, vol 2. Self-published, 1926)

== See also ==
- Frederick Richard Simms
- E. J. Pennington
