= British Motor Syndicate =

The British Motor Syndicate Limited
- Type: Public Listed Company
- Industry: Automotive
- Founded: July 1895 in London, England
- Founders: Harry J. Lawson; Ernest T Hooley
- Headquarters: 59, Holborn Viaduct, E.C., London, England
- Services: Farming of patent rights

The British Motor Syndicate Limited (BMS) was a company formed in November 1895 by company promoter and entrepreneur Harry John Lawson. Lawson's aim was to use BMS to raise funds from the public to establish a business with a monopoly on petrol-driven cars by acquiring as many patents as possible related to such vehicles from Gottlieb Daimler, his business associates, and other sources.

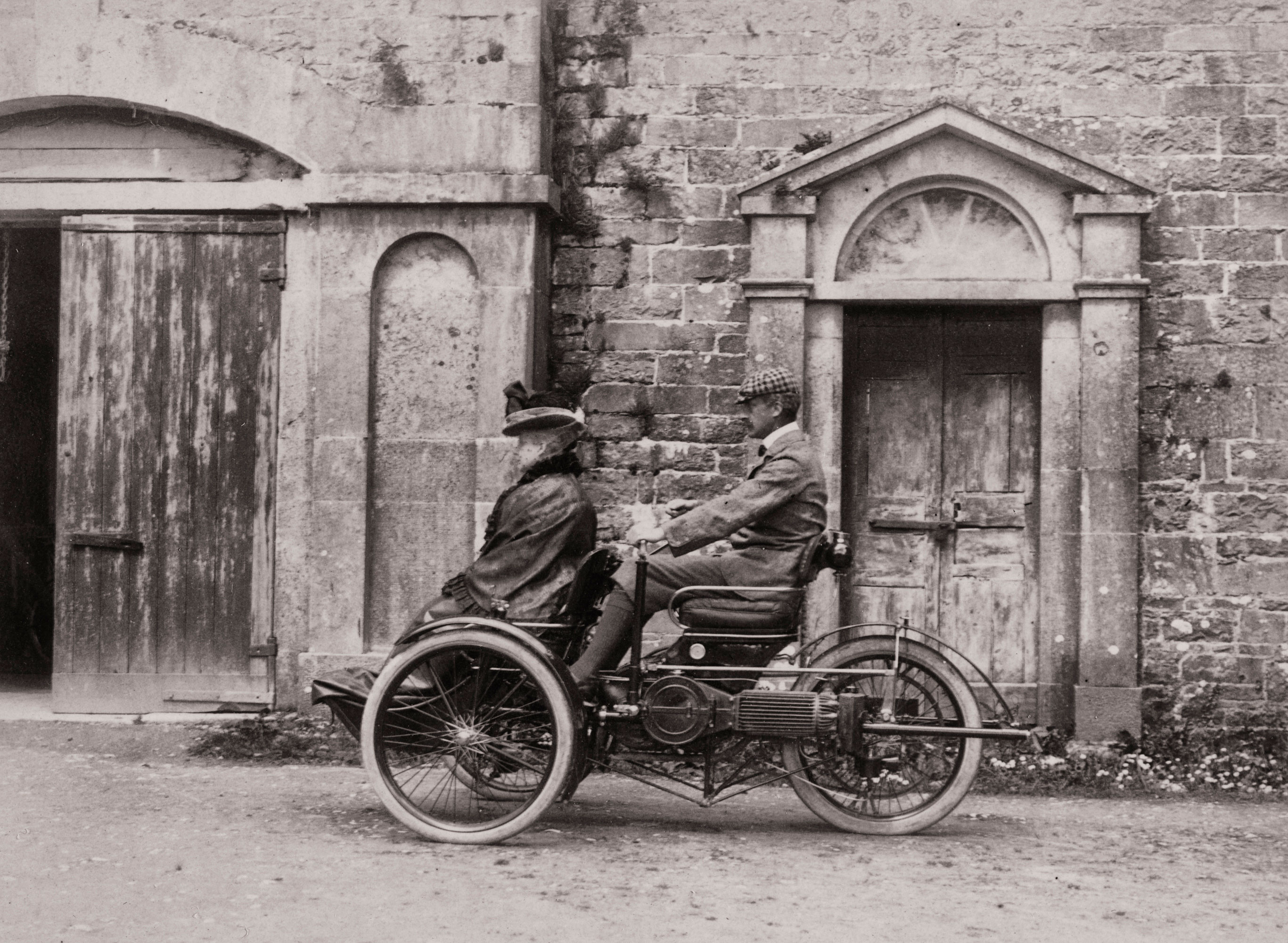
Turrell-Bollée by subsidiary The Coventry Motor Company

It was never the company's intention to produce motor cars, but rather to exploit the patents it had purchased by charging substantial royalties to automobile manufacturers for the right to manufacture cars using those patents.

== Patentees ==
By the time of the first public issue, twelve months after incorporation, the following patent holders had committed themselves to BMS:

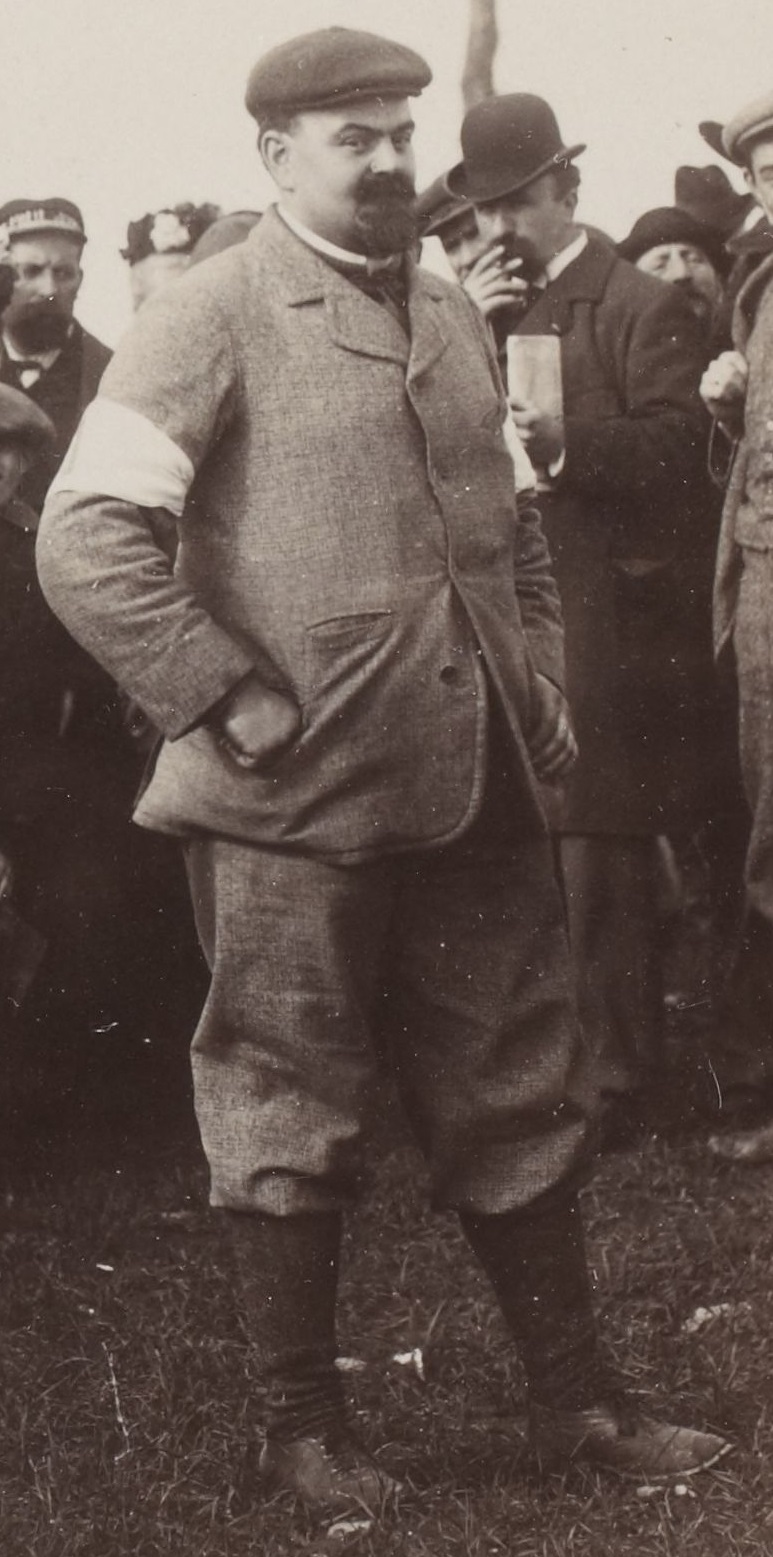
Léon Bollée 1898

- Henry P Holt of Crossley Bros, Manchester. Otto Gas Engine makers.
- Gottlieb Daimler, inventor Daimler motor carriage (master patents)
- W Worby Beaumont (consulting automobile and mechanical engineer and author)
- M. Bollée, inventor Bollée voiturette
- E J Pennington, inventor of the Pennington Motor
- Count de Dion, inventor de Dion motorcycle
- Walter Bersey, inventor electric cab and carriages
- J J Henry Sturmey, editor Autocar and many others

and BMS had received more than £200,000 from English motor car manufacturers, leading names were Lawson's Daimler and Great Horseless.

== Directors ==
Directors at the time of flotation, November 1896:

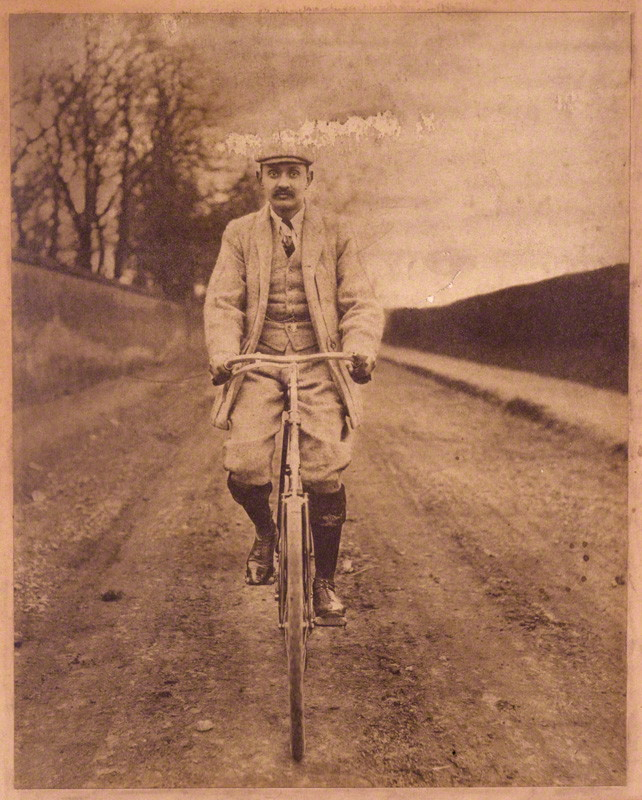
Prince Ranjitsinhji Maharaja Jam Sahib of Navanagar

- Harry John Lawson, President Motor Car Club, Founder Safety Bicycle Industry, Chairman of directors Beeston Pneumatic Tyre Company Limited
- Prince Ranjitsinhji, Owner Indian Patents
- Herbert H Mulliner, Director of: Coupé and Dunlop Brougham Company Limited, London Electrical Cab Company Limited
- Thomas Humber, Founder Humber Cycle Company
- Thomas Robinson, Director Great Horseless Carriage Company Limited
- Lord Norreys President of the Road and Path Cycling Association

Commercial manager: Herbert Osbaldeston Duncan

Brokers: Ernest T Hooley, Chapman & Rowe
Consulting Engineer: Frederick R. Simms

== Educated opinions of the float ==
The Economist was reported by the Coventry Herald as saying that the public might judge for themselves if reasonable dividends could be earned on the inflated amount of the syndicate's capital. Furthermore "the publication [of the prospectus] has been followed by a chorus of repudiations" from those said to be connected with the syndicate, one way or another. In the opinion of The Economist the syndicate would be unable to bar the way to the industry's progress by insisting on exorbitant royalties.

== Activities ==
The British Motor Syndicate was formed when cars still had to be preceded by a man on foot. Lawson could see this restriction would soon be lifted and acquired the British Daimler rights from Gottlieb Daimler's British agent Frederick R. Simms. By this time Hamburg-born London consulting engineer Simms had had these arrangements with his personal friend Gottlieb Daimler for some years. Daimler's engines were used by leading French manufacturers including Panhard-Levassor and Peugeot. Simms also received a licence fee from owners of cars built under Gottlieb Daimler's patents.

The general public promptly bought all the new capital of the November 1896 flotation despite the financial press's warnings of Lawson's failures with his other recent new flotations. Lawson then sold to embryo subsidiary business, British Daimler, the rights he had just bought from Simms – for near half the capital raised – and asked Simms as BMS consulting engineer to find suitable premises to begin manufacture of engines under the licence and complete cars. Simms found an ideal purpose-built building in Cheltenham belonging to John Henry Knight but Hooley had found a disused four-storey cotton mill in Coventry and despite its unsuitability Lawson bought that from his crony Hooley and so the motor industry developed in Coventry not Cheltenham. The new Coventry premises were shared with Edward Joel Pennington, a confidence trickster who obtained most of the cash BMS raised from the public in exchange for no cars.

The German Canstatt-Daimler business, later Daimler-Benz, had no financial interest in British Daimler or The British Motor Syndicate.

== Collapse ==
Lawson's plan did indeed have a dampening effect on the fledgling British automobile industry. Herbert Austin, for instance, abandoned the development of his first Wolseley because of its too close similarity to a vehicle the patent for which was owned by BMS. But BMS ultimately failed, most obviously because of a 1901 court decision that gutted its business model, by which time rapid improvements in technology had made the company's patents obsolete in any case.

State of the Art 1896

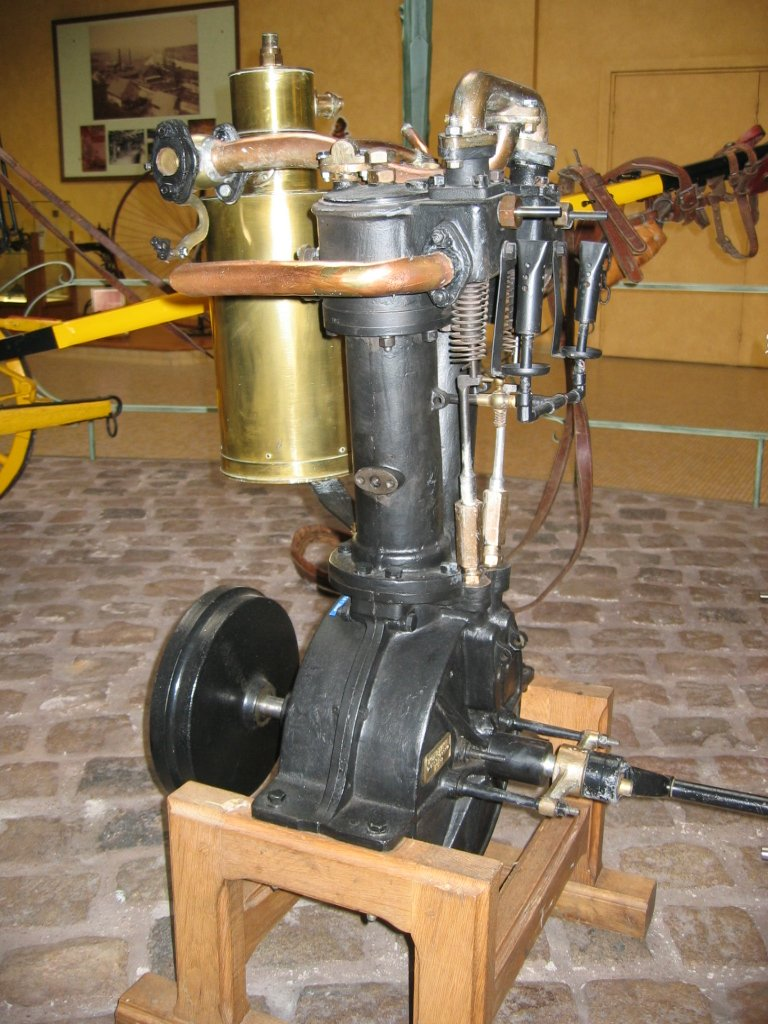
Daimler motor used by Peugeot

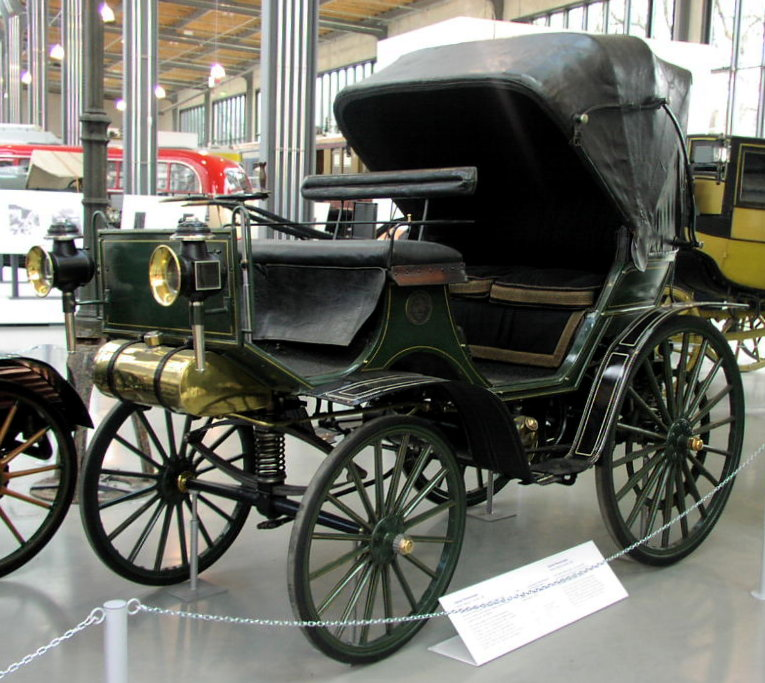
Daimler (Canstatt) cabriolet

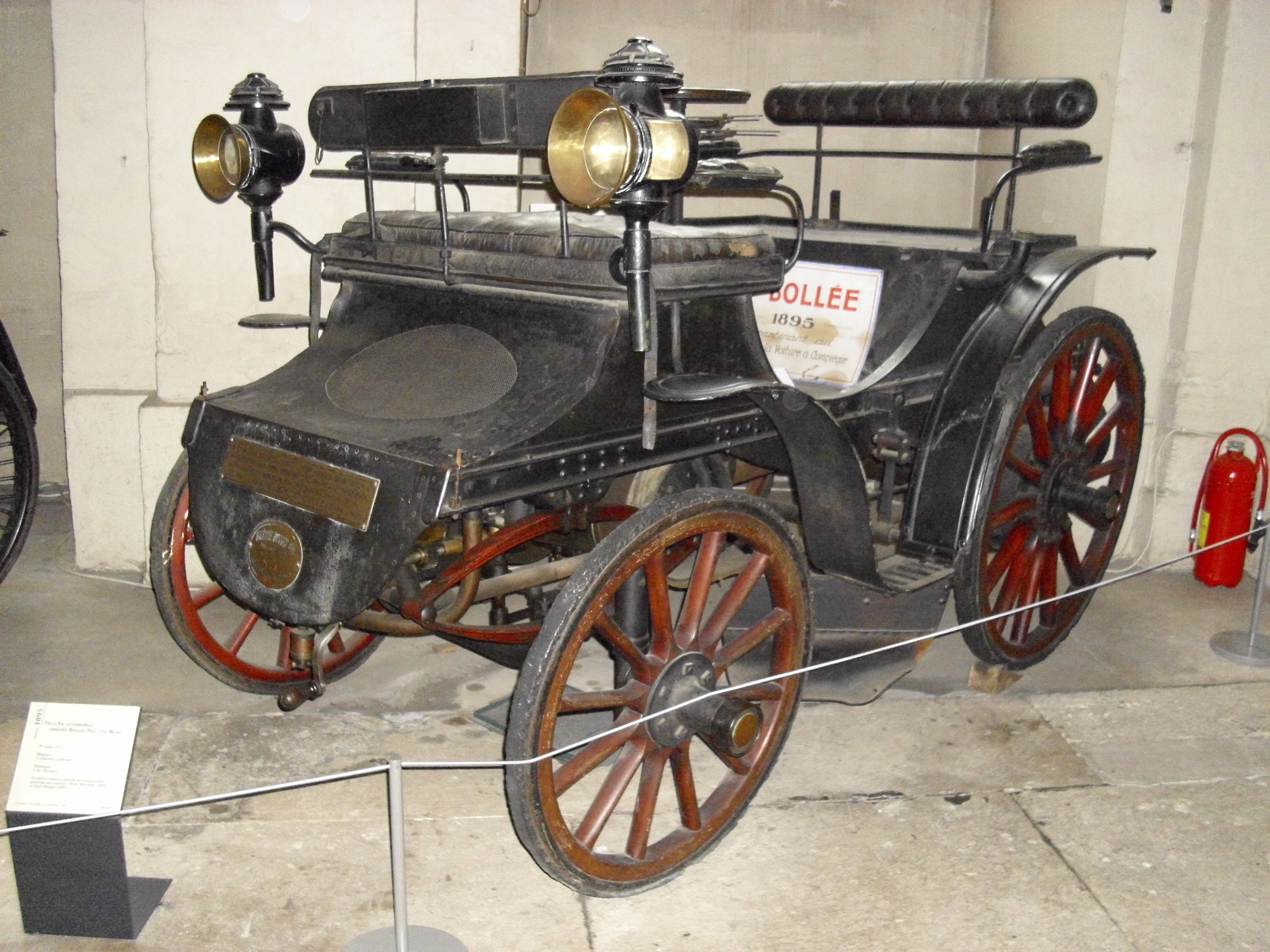
Amédée Bollée 6 c.v. vis-à-vis

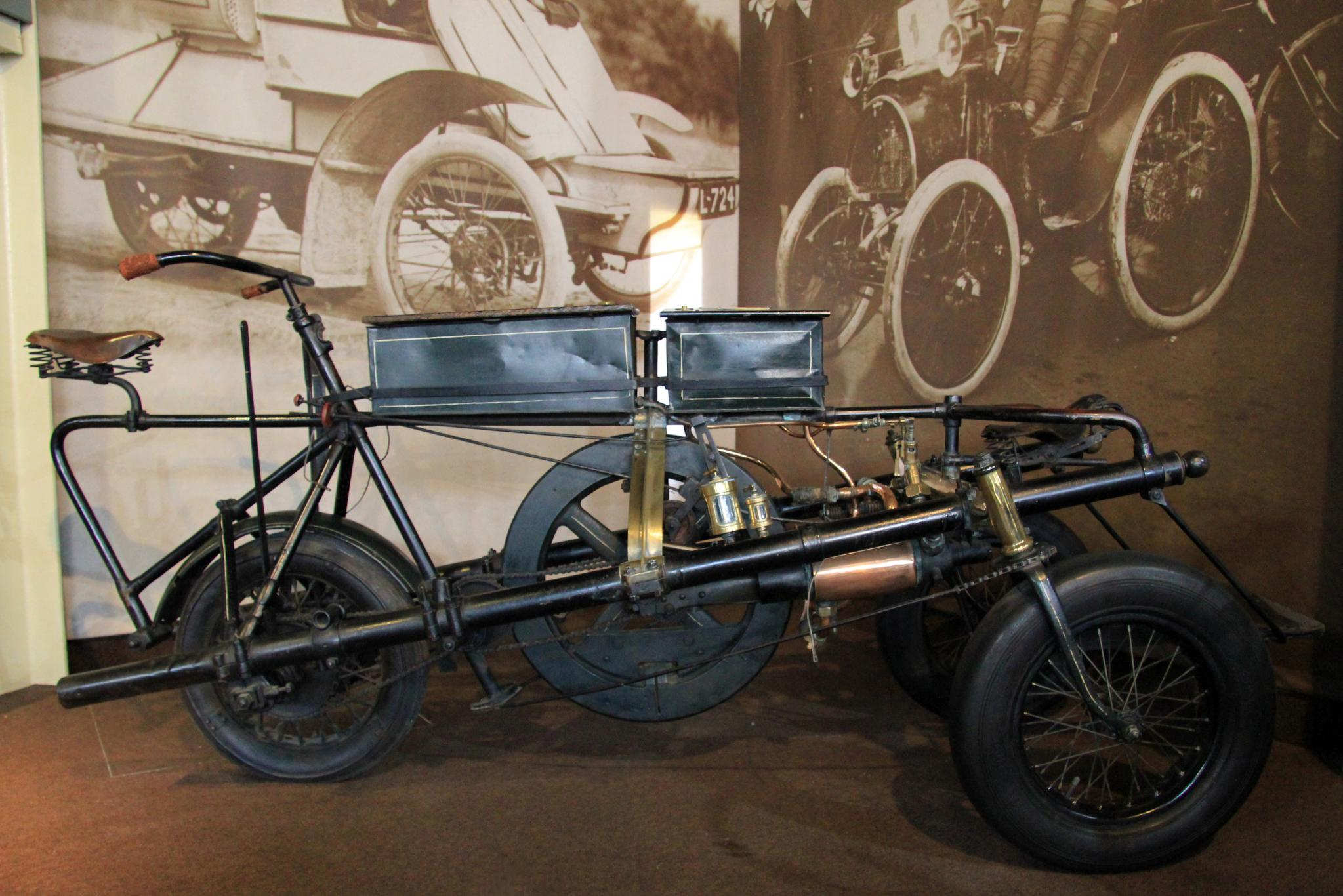
Pennington Autocar

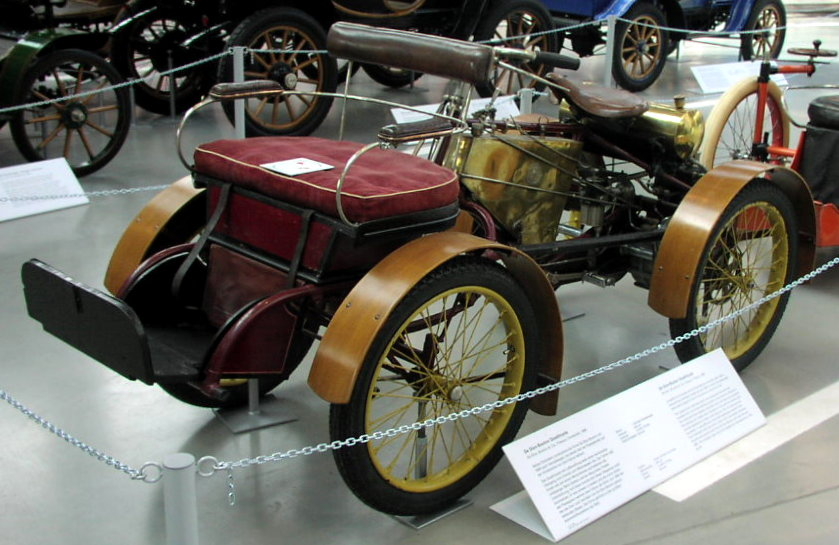
De Dion-Bouton quadricycle
