= The Great Horseless Carriage Company =

UK automobile manufacturer

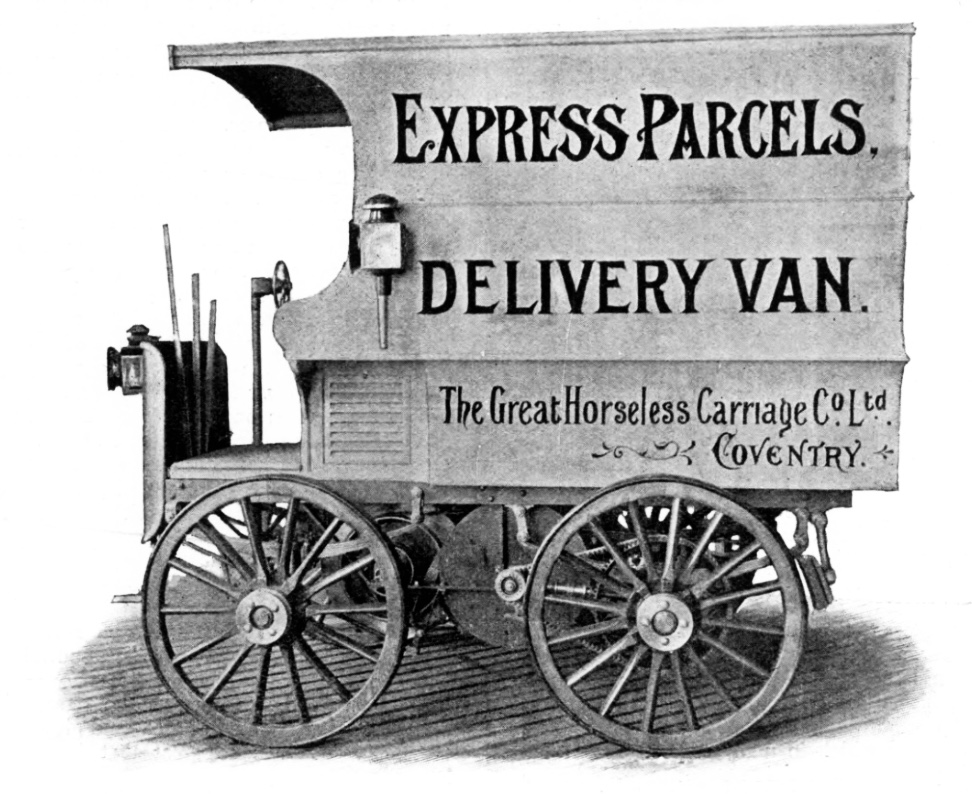
The Great Horseless Carriage Company Delivery Van (1897)

The Great Horseless Carriage Company Limited was formed in May 1896 with a capital of £750,000 in shares of £10 each "of which £250,0000 was for working capital". The company was formed to carry on the horseless carriage industry in England and works with railway and canal adjoining were secured at Coventry. The rights that were purchased had little lasting value and after a number of financial reconstructions beginning in 1898 all activities were terminated by 1910.

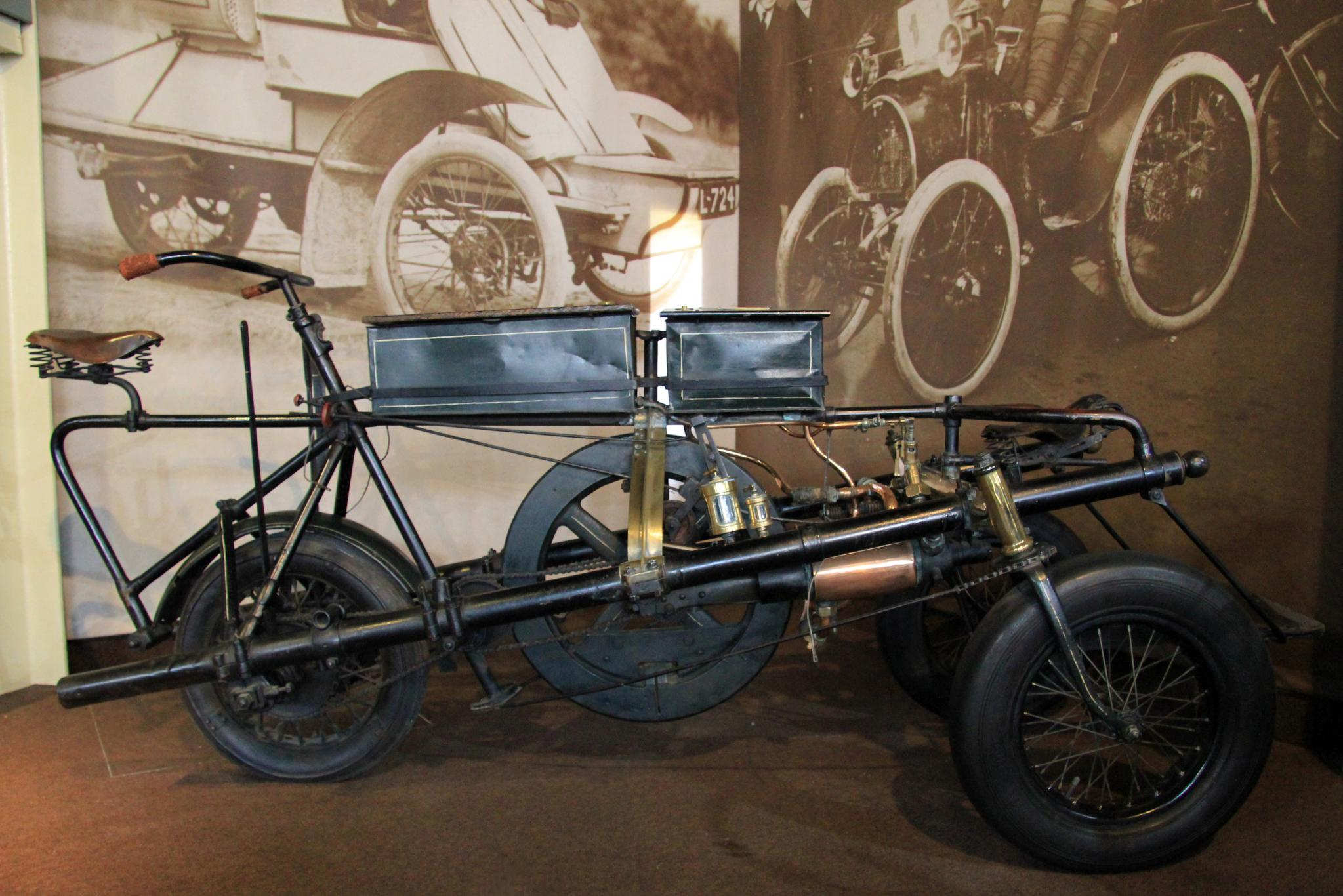
Pennington Autocar 1896 by The Great Horseless Carriage Company

== Business ==
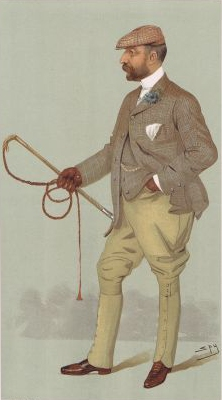
Terah Hooley company promoter

"To take up work and develop this new vehicle industry; to acquire licences for patents, purchase master patents and receive royalties, to license and form subsidiary companies to sell foreign rights and concessions and to generally establish and work the trade in this country."

It was intended to dominate the industry through its subsidiary The British Motor Syndicate Limited by acquiring all "master patents" so that no car could be made or sold in Great Britain without being licensed by it.

== Products ==
Though the intended business was no more than to simply own patents and rights and earn steady income from the sale of them to manufacturers The Great Horseless Carriage Company did produce five Pennington autocars, the rights to which had been purchased from Kane-Pennington at a vast price reportedly £100,000.

== Directors ==
- The Earl of Winchilsea and Nottingham, National Agricultural Union, chairman Cycle Manufacturers' Tube Company Limited
- Harry J. Lawson, inventor Safety Bicycle, chairman Beeston Pneumatic Tyre Company Limited, chairman The British Motor Syndicate Limited
- Herbert H Mulliner, chairman of Mulliners Limited, chairman of Carriage Builders
- George Salter, George Salter & Co, West Bromwich
- J H Mace, director of London Road Car Company and Northampton Street Tramways Company
- Frederick Goddard, director of Humber & Co limited
- T Harrison Lambert, director of Humber & Co limited
- Hon Evelyn H Ellis, director of Daimler Company Limited
- E J Pennington, inventor of Pennington Motor Carriage
- Gottlieb Daimler, inventor of Daimler Motor Carriage
- Comte de Dion, inventor of De Dion Road Motor Carriage, Paris
- J J Henry Sturmey, director of Daimler Company Limited

A company promoter, a journalist (Sturmey), 2 aristocrats, 3 engineers (Germany, France, USA ['Airship' Pennington]), 5 sound Midlands businessmen. 'Twelve men good and true'.

== Sent to Coventry ==
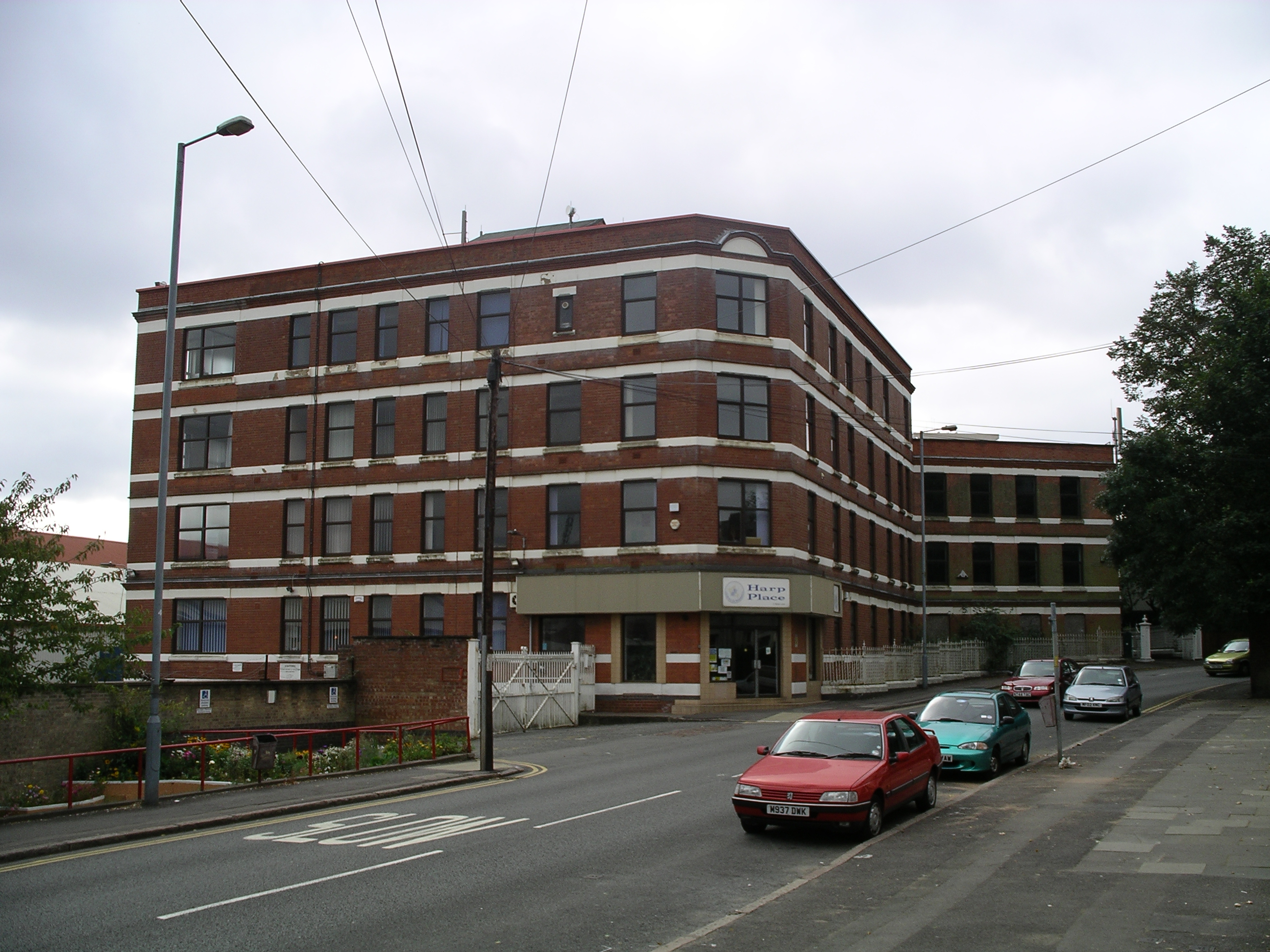
Motor Mills, Daimler's office block Sandy Lane, Coventry (with a power station) all that was left standing after 1941 air raids built in the 1860s for Coventry Cotton Spinning & Weaving Co

Diminutive company promoter and deputy chairman, Harry Lawson, self-described "Pioneer of fin-de-siècle Locomotion" had already acquired Daimler using British Motor Syndicate Limited which he then owned with his partners E. T. Hooley and Martin Rucker. Hooley had acquired a disused four-storey cotton mill as a speculation and, though F. R. Simms had carefully selected Cheltenham, Lawson added Hooley's Coventry cotton mill to the portfolio, renamed the building Motor Mills, and installed Daimler there on one floor.

It was intended that Daimler would produce engines and chassis in the Motor Mills and British Motor Syndicate would use them to form a range of cars and commercial vehicles. Although they meant to build cars based on the German Daimler designs Cannstatt was so reluctant to actually provide the agreed plans instead a couple of Paris-built Panhard Levassors were imported and used as patterns. Though they were Daimler powered they were more modern than the obsolescent Cannstatt vehicles and the Coventry-built engines also had design improvements.

Though a director, Gottlieb Daimler had no financial interest in Lawson's companies and he attended no board meetings.

== Failure ==
Automotive technology was rapidly changing and the expensive patents were rapidly outdated. This became obvious as 1897 progressed. Investments became worthless and share prices collapsed.

The GHCC shareholders met on 22 December 1897. H J Lawson as their company's chairman, took the opportunity to tell them foundations had been laid "for several working departments which would only require gradual extension to become fully competent to manage a very large output". He also advised the directors would gladly tender their resignations should the shareholders desire them.

A committee of shareholders who had enquired into the business presented their report together with a scheme of reconstruction under which a new company, Motor Manufacturing Company Limited, would be incorporated. This new company would have the present building, plant and stock and a universal free licence to manufacture under the British Motor Syndicate patents. The British Motor Syndicate would take over all the liabilities of GHCC. Some of the orders for the Daimler Company – which was, Lawson said, "turning out more cars than any firm in Europe" – would be given to the new company.

== Liquidation ==
The Great Horseless Carriage Company Limited was placed in liquidation in January 1898. It was to be succeeded by the Motor Manufacturing Company Limited also known as MMC. British Motor Syndicate was to be succeeded by British Motor Company Limited.

The Great Horseless Carriage Company Limited underwent a number of financial reconstructions and lasted in name until 1910.

== Lawson convicted for fraud ==
In 1904, company promoter Harry Lawson and business partner E. T. Hooley were indicted for "an ingenious system of fraud carried out over a long period". Lawson, who defended himself, was found guilty and sentenced to a year's hard labour. Hooley was defended by Rufus Isaacs and found not guilty.
