= Motor Manufacturing Company =

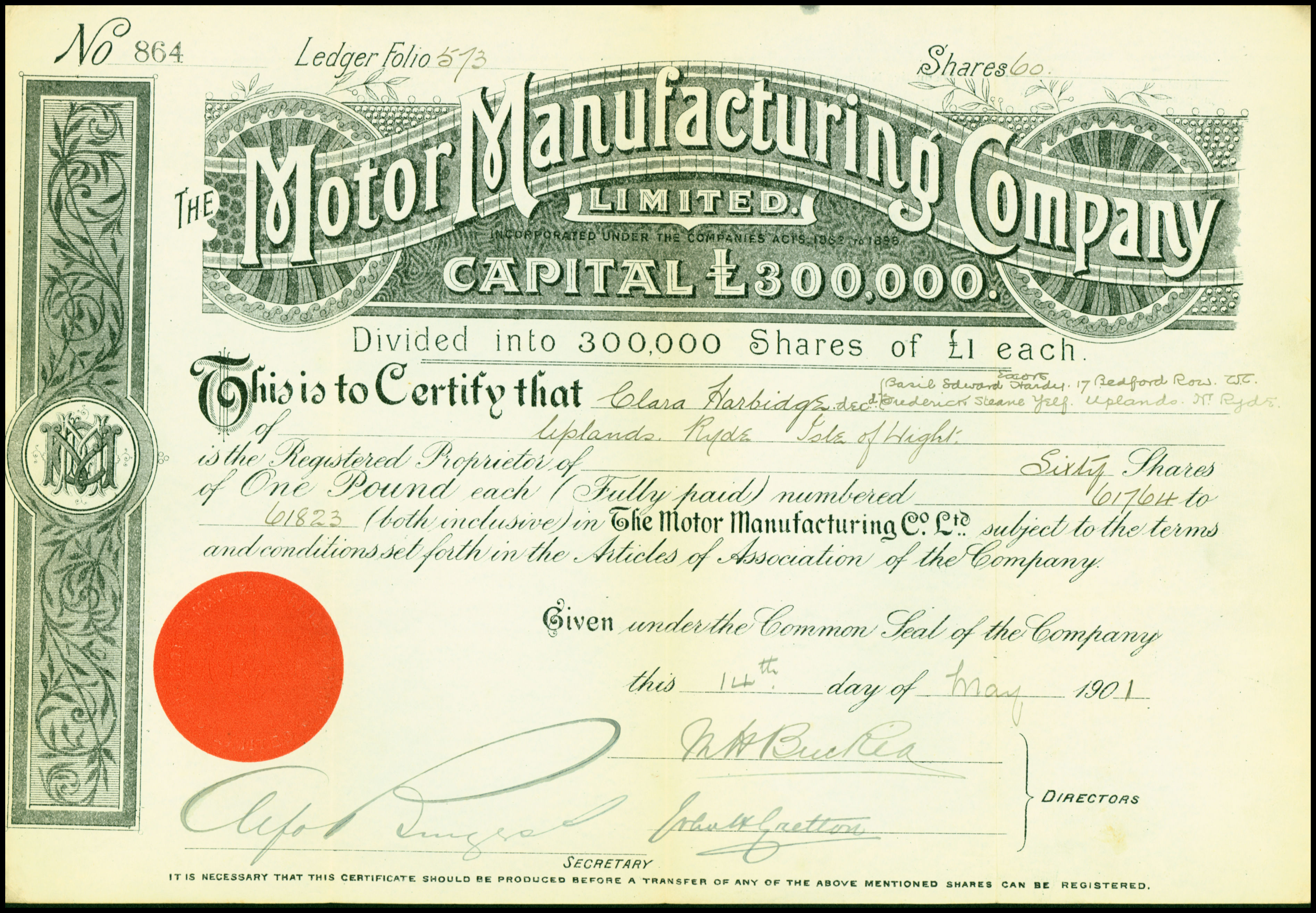
Share of the Motor Manufacturing Company, issued 14. May 1901

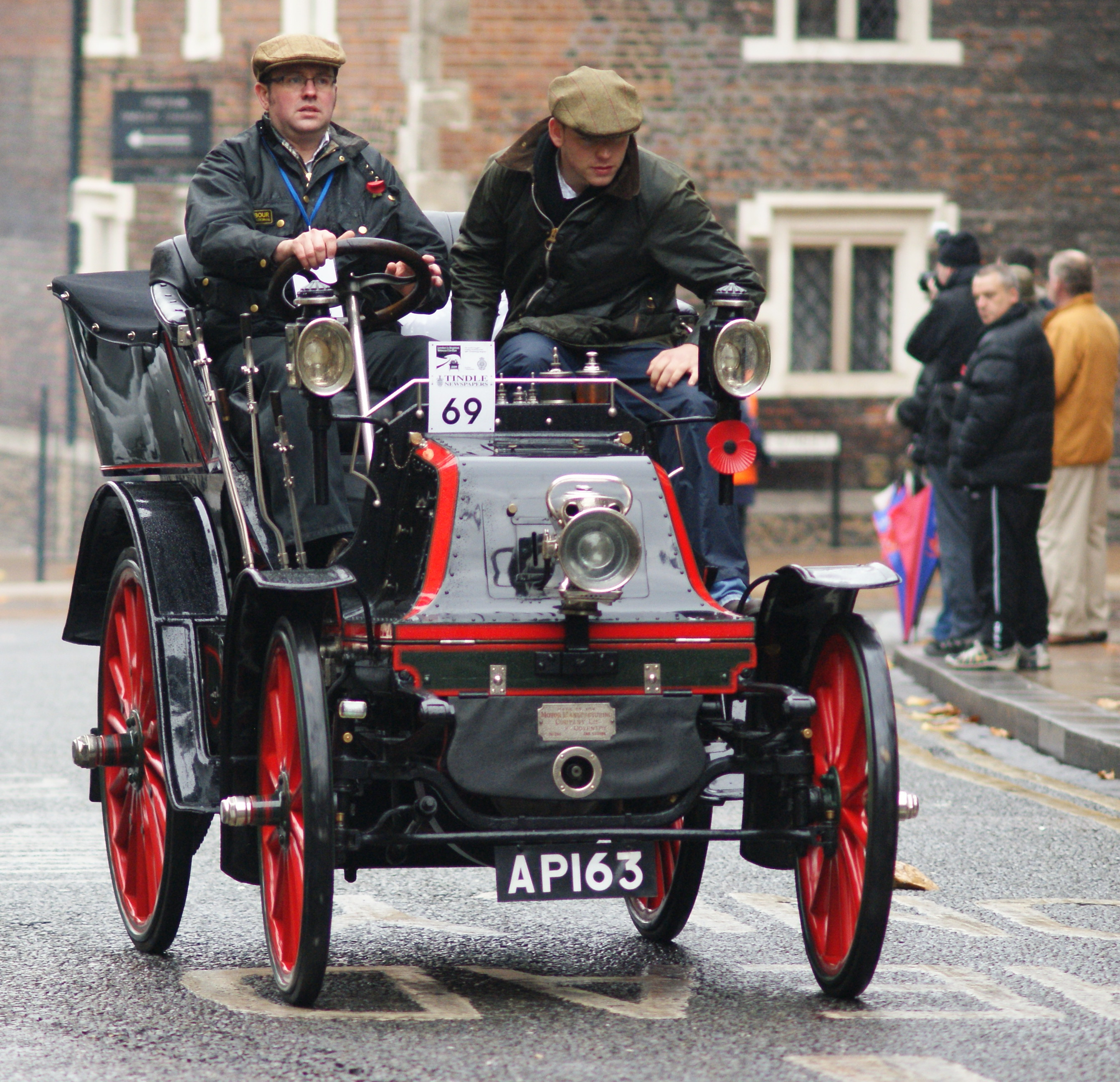
MMC 1900

Motor Manufacturing Company Limited, incorporated 1902 following companies of the same name formed in 1898 and 1900 was the third and final revival of H. J. Lawson's The Great Horseless Carriage Company.

In 1904 Lawson and business partner E. T. Hooley were indicted for "an ingenious system of fraud carried out over a long period". Lawson, who defended himself, was found guilty and sentenced to a year's hard labour. MMC went out of business.

== Production ==
- Voiturette

== Prizes ==
In The 1000-Mile Trial of Motor-Cars, their Iveagh phaeton completed the entire trial. In class D—the most expensive for which a prize was given—first prize went to Daimler and second to MMC. The gold medal for the most meritorious competitor was given to the Panhard of Hon C S Rolls.

== Liquidation ==
The following report appeared on page 30 of The Automotor Journal of 7 January 1905:

"Motor Manufacturing Company Limited in Liquidation

Under the compulsory winding up order made last October against this company Mr H M Winearls (Assistant Receiver) has now issued his report to the creditors and shareholders. The statement of affairs shows total liabilities £41,125 and assets valued at sufficient to yield a surplus of £20,775 after payment of the debt. The account with the contributories discloses a deficiency of £42,453.

Mr Winearls reports that the company was formed in June 1902 to acquire and carry on the business which had been successively been carried on by the Great Horseless Carriage Company Limited registered in May 1896, Motor Manufacturing Company Limited registered January 1898 and a company of the same name registered March 1900.

The capital of £80,000 was divided into 320,000 shares of 5s each. The consideration for the sale was the undertaking by the new company to satisfy the liablilities of the old company amounting to £38,000 and to pay the costs of liquidation of the old company and of forming the new company and to issue to the liquidator of the old company or his nominee 252, 966 shares of 5s each with 3s credited as paid. Only 136,562 of those shares were applied for but the remaining 116,404 were taken up in consideration of a payment of £2,500 by the liquidator of the old company.

During the first year the business was successful and several prizes were obtained by the company's cars. A dividend of 5 per cent was paid out of the first year's profits but during the following year the company was in need of working capital and issued debentures with the result that in June last Mr Frank E Beadle was appointed receiver and manager on behalf of the debenture holders. The failure of the company is attributed to want of working capital and pressure of creditors."

== Disposal ==
Shortly afterwards The Daimler Company reported that they had acquired at Coventry MMC's adjoining lease together with its plant and machinery.
