= Herbert Osbaldeston Duncan =

English racing bicyclist (1862–1945)

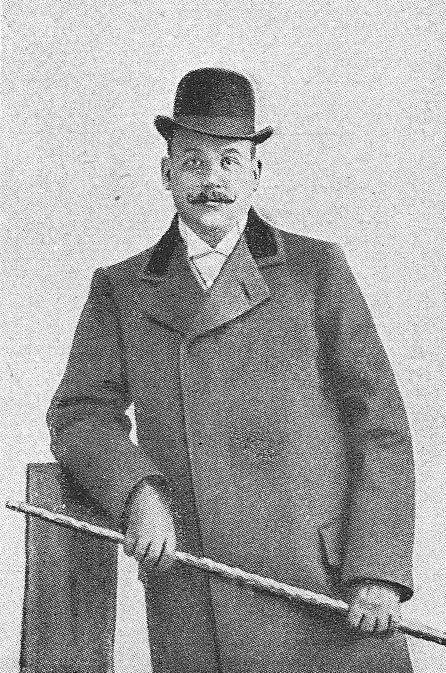
- Born: 1862
- Died: 1945 (aged 82–83); France
- Burial place: Le Vesinet cemetery in Yvelines
- Education: Taplow College
- Occupations: Racing bicyclist, journalist, and automotive pioneer
- Employers: British Motor Syndicate (BMS); de Dion-Bouton
- Known for: Founding the Motor Review
- Notable work: The World on Wheels (1926)

Herbert Osbaldeston Duncan (1862–1945) was an English racing bicyclist, journalist, and pioneer of the British automobile industry. Duncan became interested in cycling during his time at Taplow College, and in 1878 he joined the Belgrave Bicycle Club determined to make a career in the sport. He became a well-known cycling journalist and later founded the Motor Review.

Duncan was recruited by H. J. Lawson to become commercial manager of the British Motor Syndicate (BMS), an early automobile manufacturer. In that role he organised the first ever British motor exhibition in 1896, at the Imperial Institute in South Kensington, London.

After the BMS's failure in 1897 Duncan moved to France, then the leading manufacturer of automobiles in Europe, and took over the management of de Dion-Bouton from 1898 until 1916. He subsequently returned to London, where he became the company's British Empire representative.

Duncan published his memoirs in 1926 under the title The World on Wheels.

Duncan died in France in 1945. He is buried in the Vesinet cemetery in Yvelines.
