= Léon Bollée Automobiles =

Léon Bollée Automobiles Logo

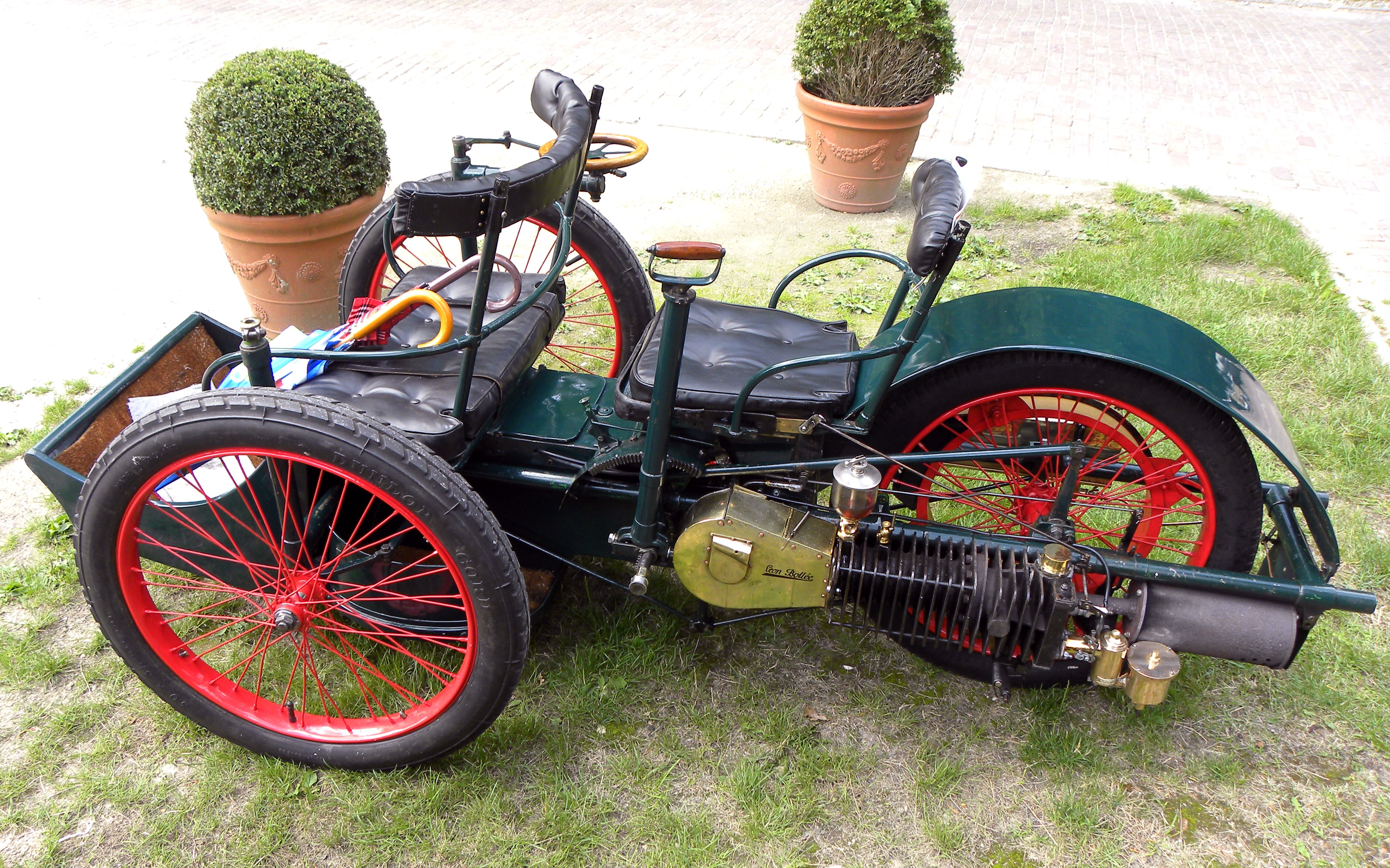
voiturette

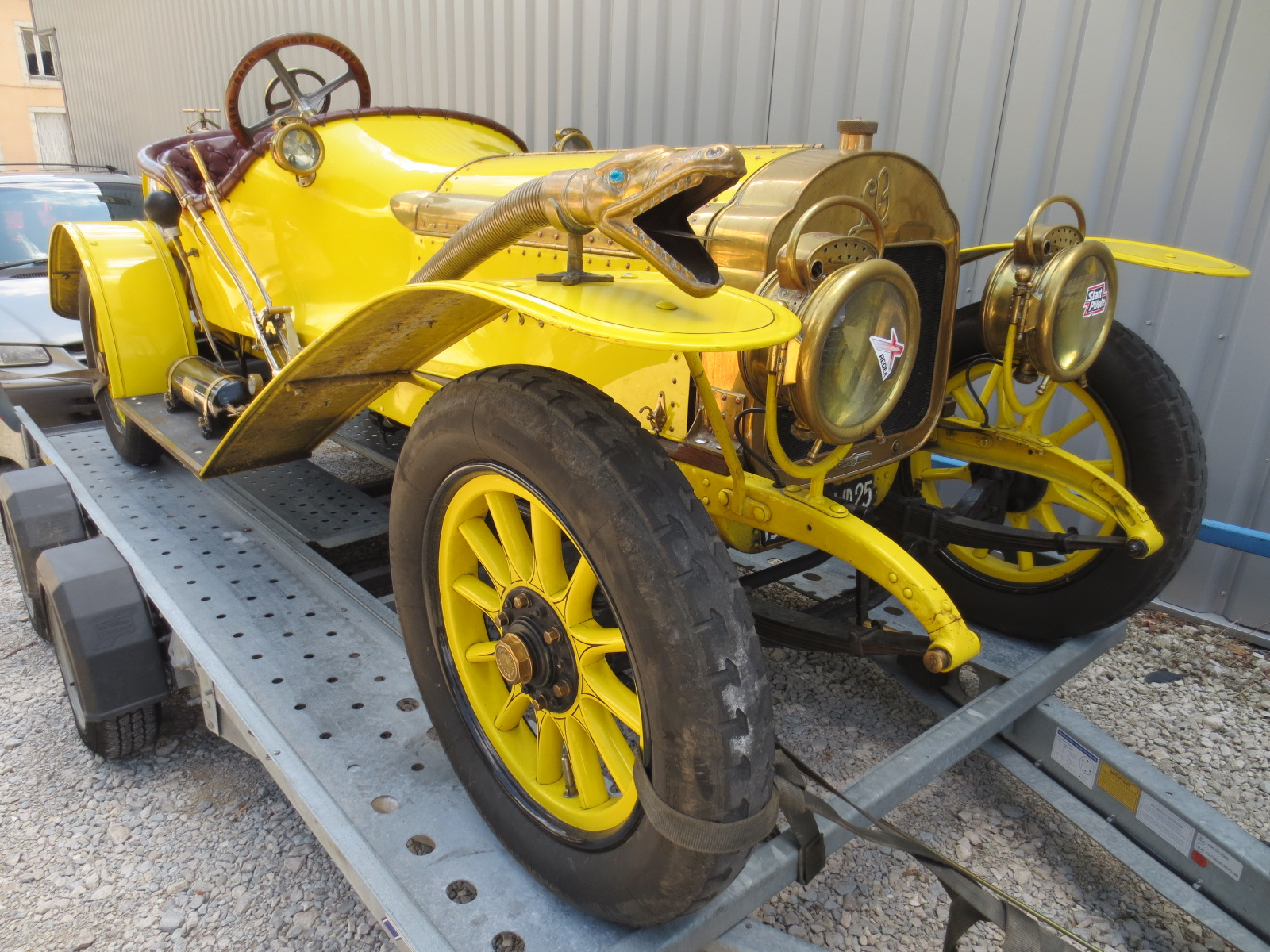
1910 G3 sports-racing car body: Delaroche & Turquet of Le Mans

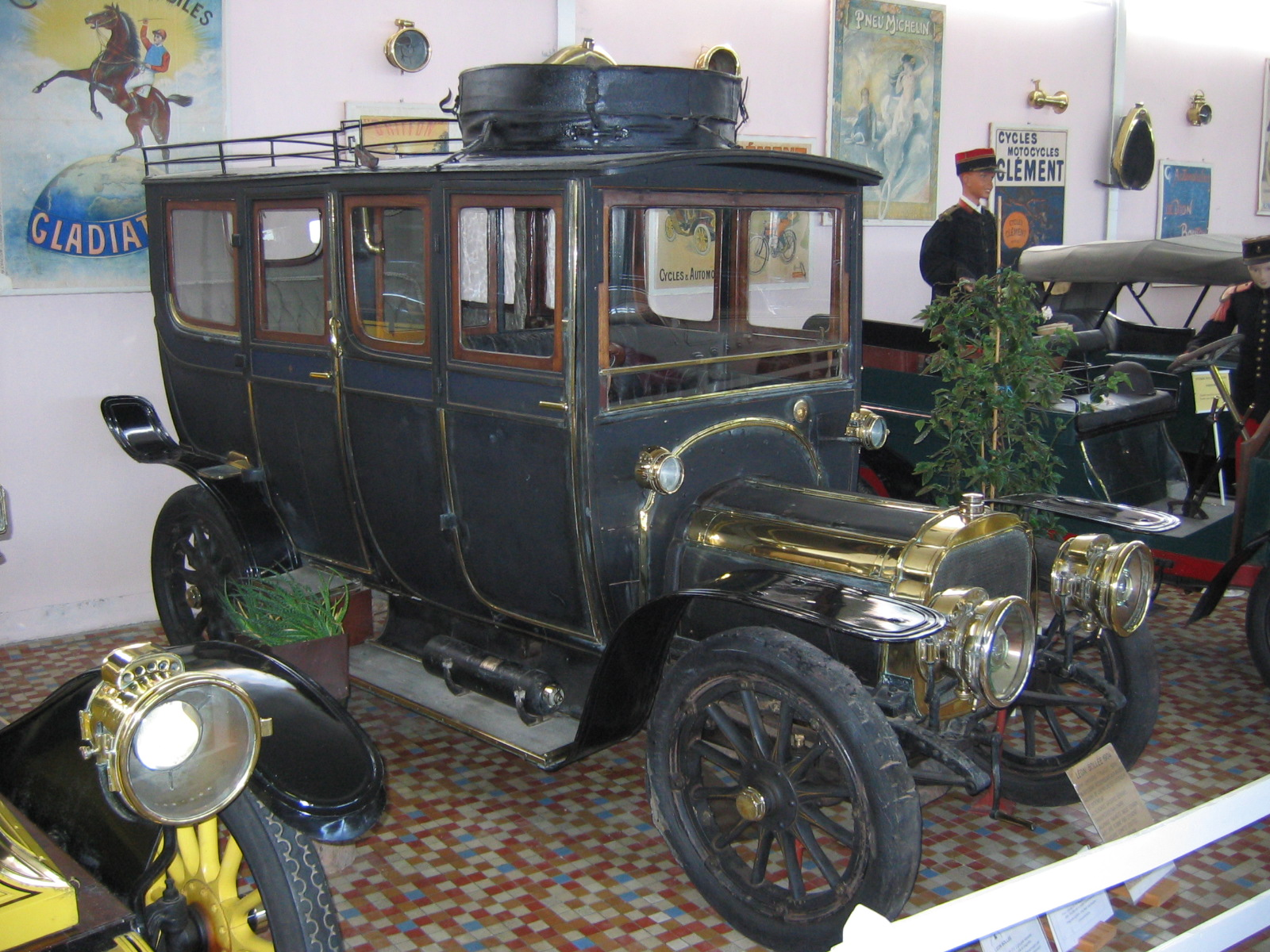
1904 20CV limousine

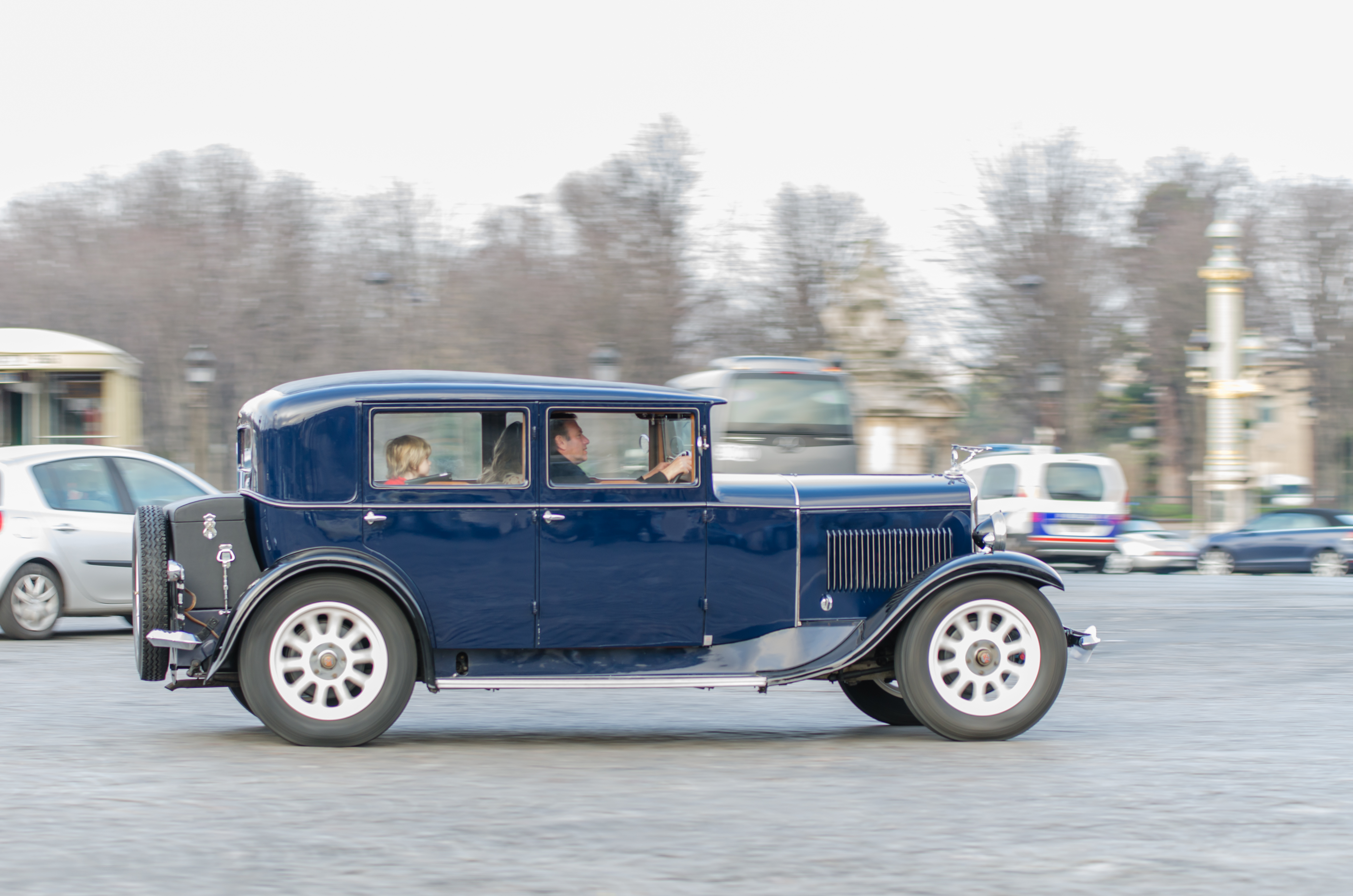
1932 Morris-Léon Bollée Léon Bollée Morris Collection, Paris

Léon Bollée Automobiles was a French company founded by Léon Bollée in Le Mans to build a first vehicle called "Voiturette".

== Bollée family brands ==
The Bollée family, all car makers, created three brands:

- steam vehicles, Amédée Bollée (father), built between 1873 and 1885.
- petrol (gasoline) cars, Amédée Bollée (son), built between 1896 and 1923.
- the automobiles of Léon Bollée, between 1895 and 1931.

== Léon Bollée Automobiles ==
The first "Voiturette" built by Léon Bollée in 1895 was a three-wheel tandem driven by a single-cylinder 3 HP engine with belt drive. The cars sold well and several hundred were made for Léon Bollée by Hurtu & Diligeon, only the prototypes were made at the Le Mans factory.

The law restricting motor vehicles to four miles per hour on Britain's public roads was lifted for light vehicles in November 1896. A 'race' was held in celebration from London to Brighton, which saw a 'one-two' for the Bollée brothers in their voiturettes. (Note: Léon and Camille Bollée drove special two-cylinder racing versions of their voiturettes. Their speed was constrained by having an umpire in the front seat, known as the "tue belle-mère" (mother-in-law killer).)

Bollée's next vehicle appeared in 1899. It was a four-wheel car with independent suspension, whose engine attracted the attention in 1900 of Darracq, which used it in its own models.

In 1903, a new factory was built in Le Mans and here Léon Bollée Automobiles built two four-cylinder models: one of 28 HP and 4.6 litres, and another of 45 HP and eight litres. These cars were equipped in 1907 with a six-cylinder motor and in 1909 with a four-cylinder of 10/14 HP.

The series of 1910 included nine models of which two were of more than 10 litres. By 1911 they were making 600 cars a year.

Léon Bolée died in 1913 but the company continued operations being run by his widow and during World War I, as well as a few cars, made ammunition and machine guns. Car production returned fully in 1919 with the 2612 cc Type H followed in 1922 by a 3918 cc six.

== Morris-Léon Bollée ==
In 1924, Morris Motors Limited, after failing to introduce its cars into France, (Note: A report on the 1926 French Motor Show by a London paper noted there were just two British manufacturers displaying vehicles: Rolls-Royce (with French coachwork) and Austin though there was on a Morris stand a Morris-Léon Bollée. This the paper said was because of the impossibility of competing with local businesses protected by high import duties. Imports had to recover a further 57.5 per cent import duty and direct taxation. Italian and American cars with lower initial cost of production were better able to compete with local cars. Paris Motor Show.) made a second attempt by buying the factory at Le Mans to make cars with four-cylinder engines very similar to those of the Morris Cowley and Morris Oxford bullnose. The new company was called "Morris-Léon Bollée".

The company was reorganized by directors sent from Morris Motors Limited factory in Cowley, and the production of Morris-Léon Bollée cars began at the end of 1925.

The first car, the Type MLB had a Hotchkiss 12 HP, 2.5 litre engine. In 1928 an 18 HP model appeared equipped with a straight-eight, 3-litre engine but only six were made.

In spite of difficulties in obtaining components, production reached 150 cars per week. However, the French market did not readily take to buying cars made by a foreign company and as sales did not meet expectations production stopped in 1928.

Morris Motors Limited was unable to make the French company profitable and finally, in 1931, Morris closed the company and sold the stock to a partnership which handled the sale of the last cars produced. Thus ended the history of the Léon Bollée car.
