= E. J. Pennington =

American motorcycle designer

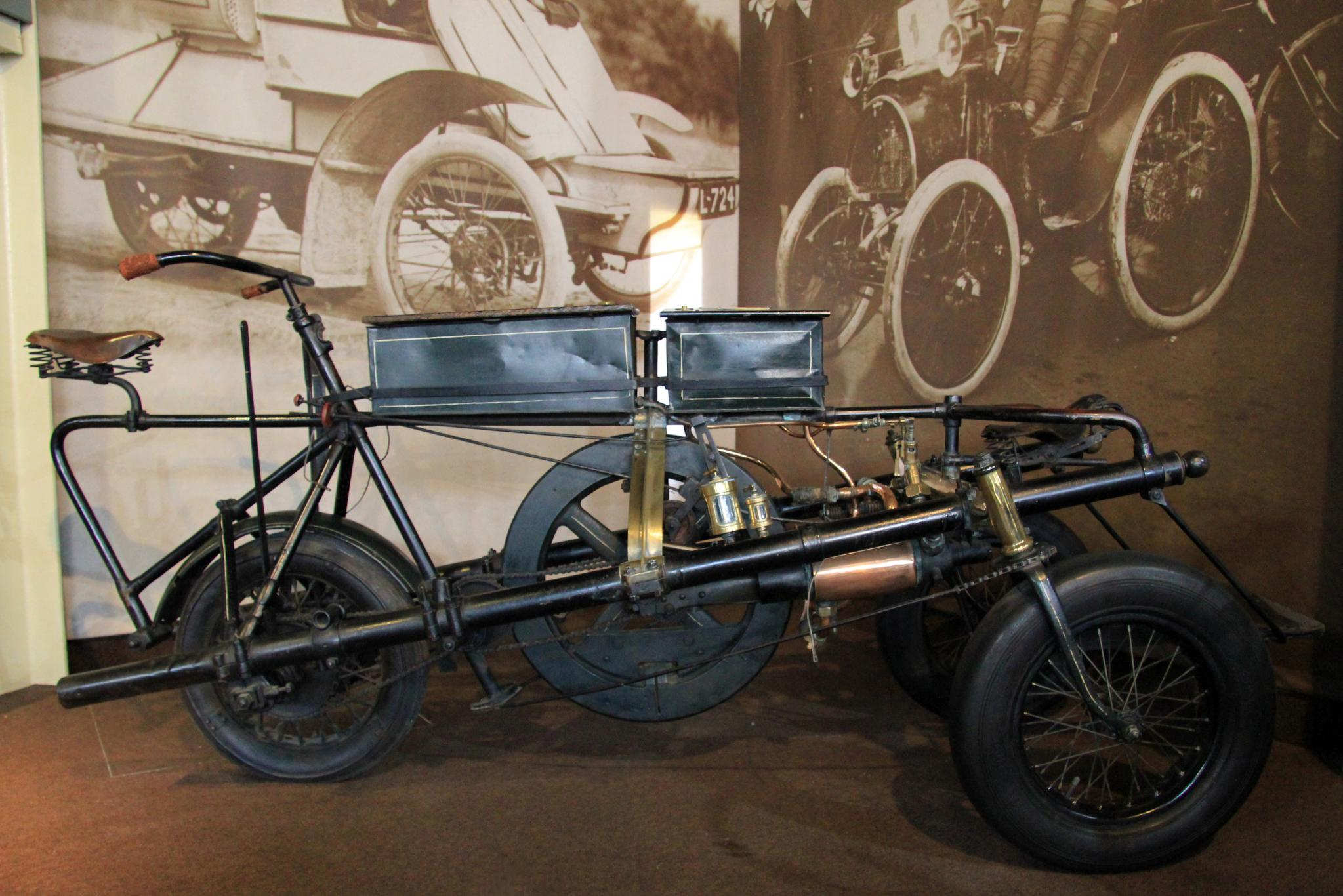
Pennington Autocar 1896 National Motor Museum

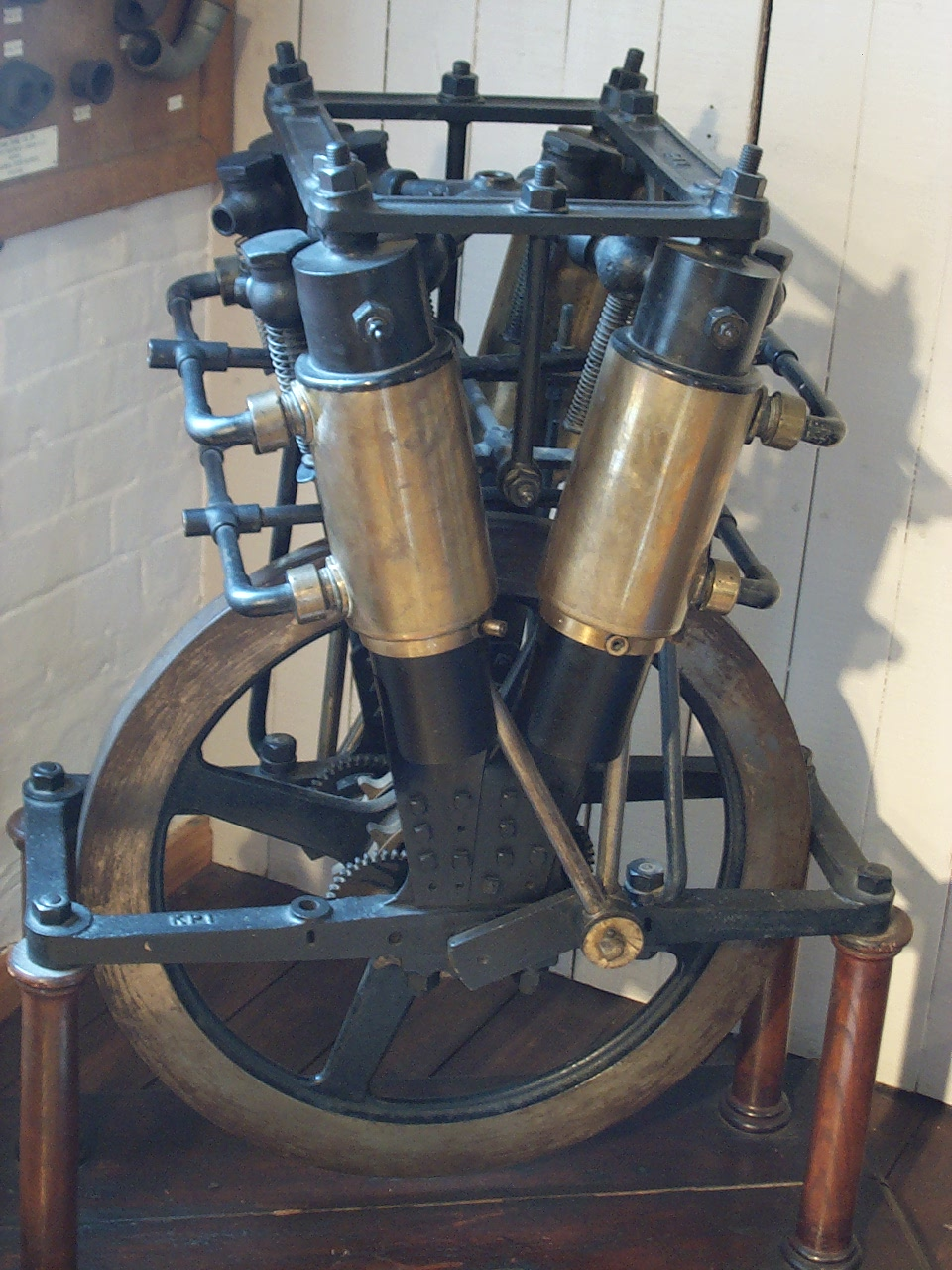
The 1896 Kane Pennington engine on display in Bedford Museum & Art Gallery

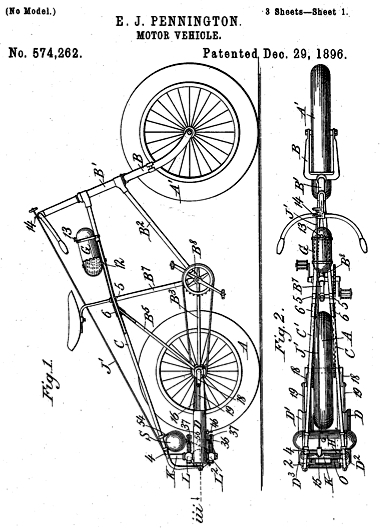
Pennington's patent for a "Motor-Vehicle"

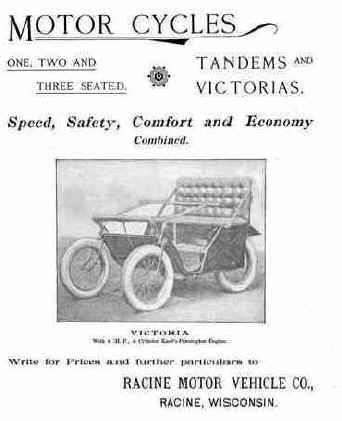
1895 Kane-Pennington Victoria

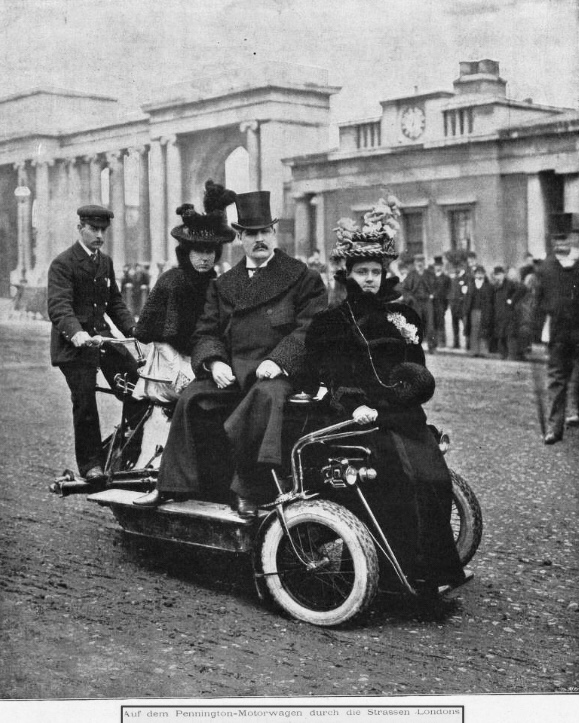
Pennington Autocar (1899)

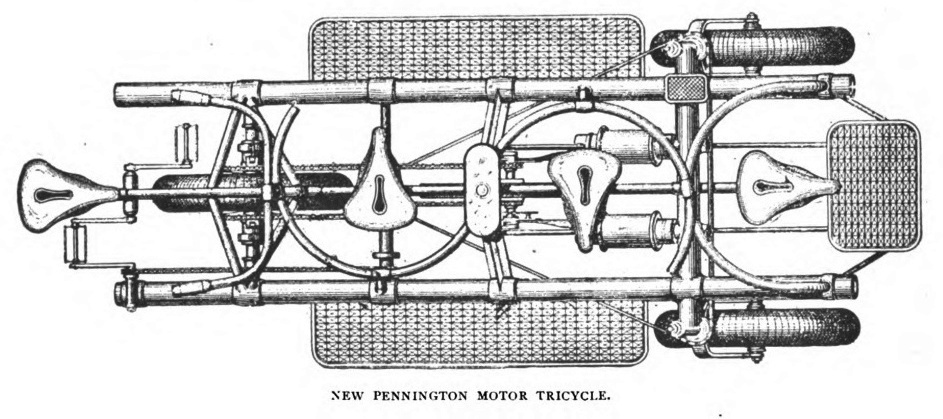
Pennington Autocar (1896, top view)

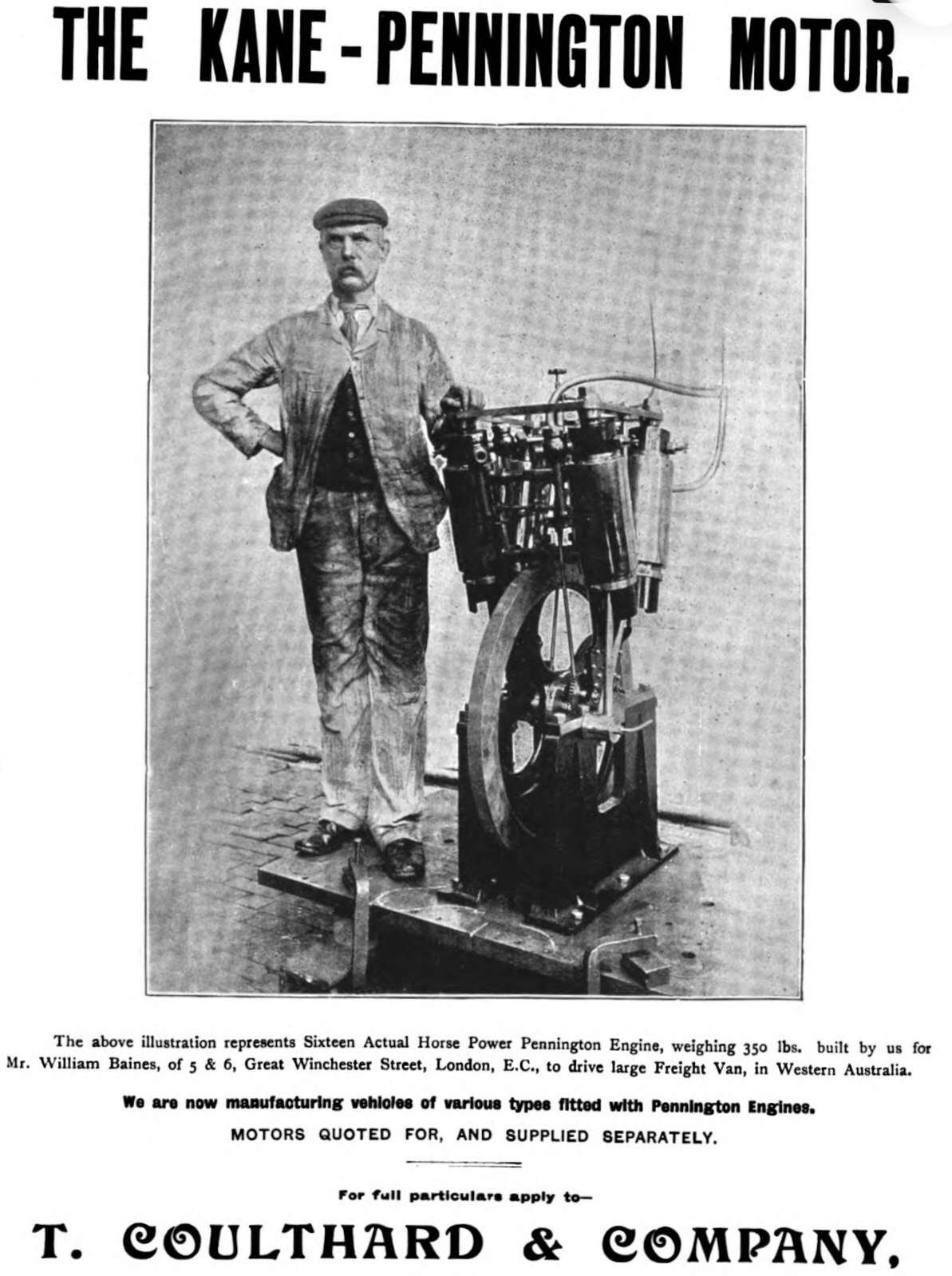
Kane-Pennington Motor (1896)

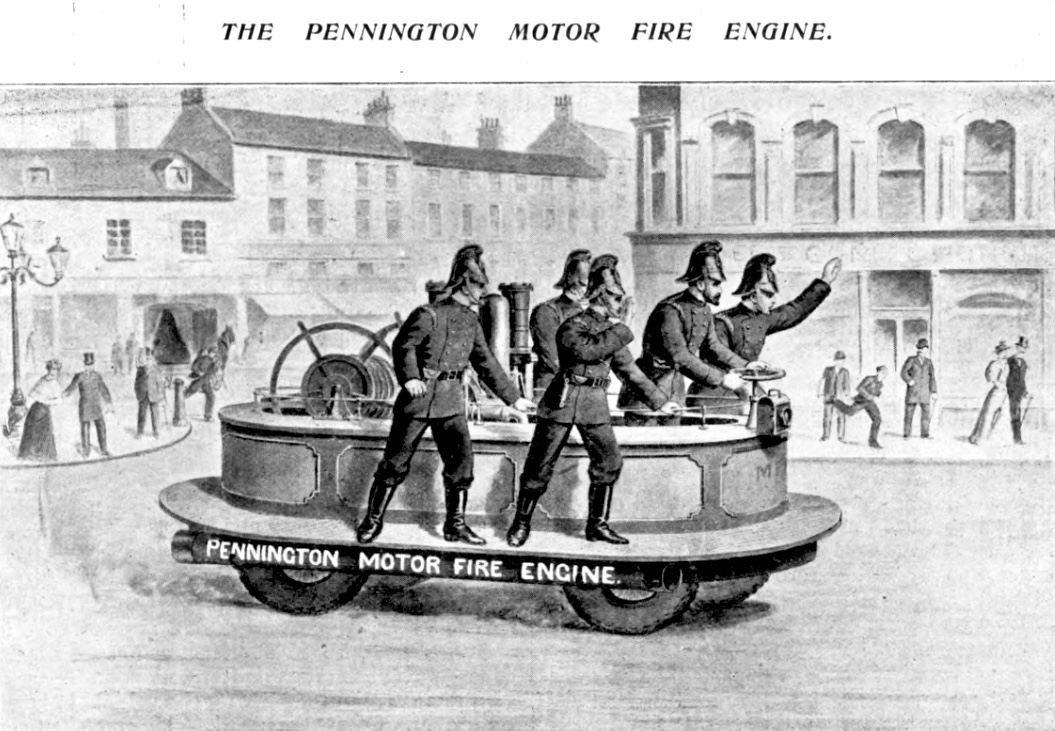
Pennington Motor Fire Engine (1897) four cylinder 30 hp

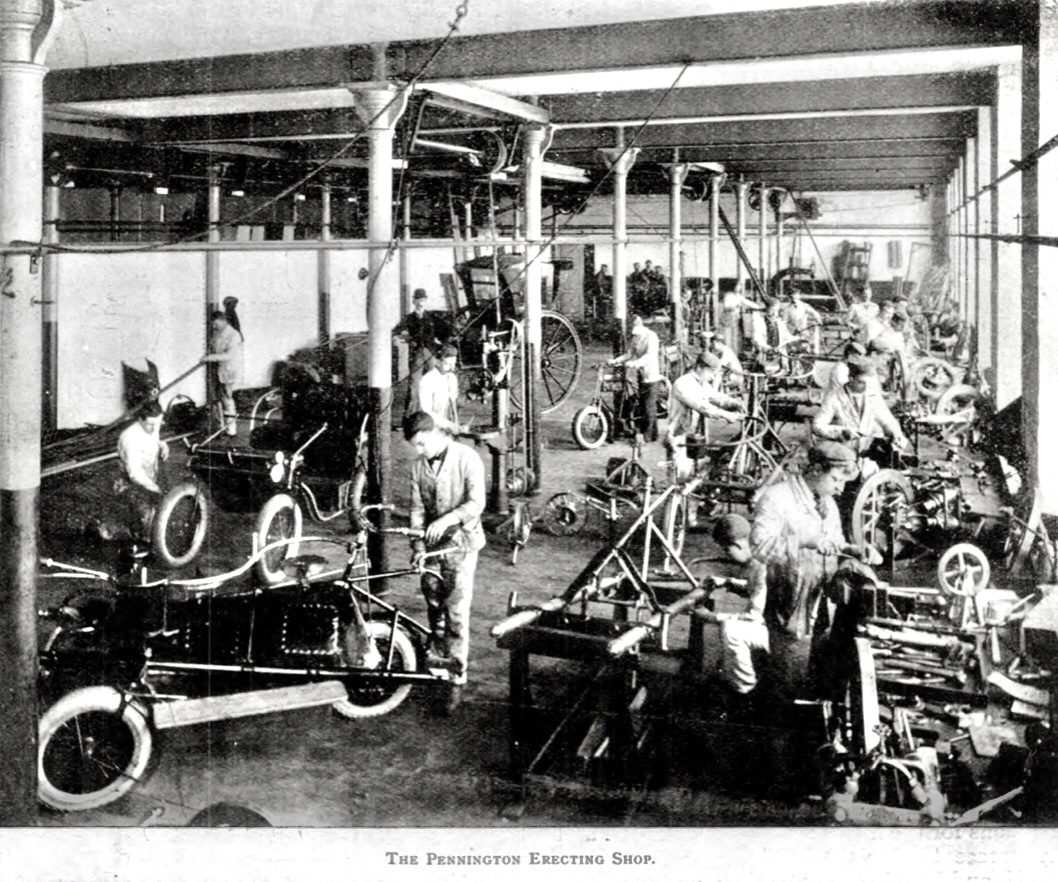
Pennington erecting shop (1897)

Edward Joel Pennington (1858 in Moores Hill, Indiana – 1911 in Springfield, Massachusetts) was an inventor and promoter of many mechanical devices, including airships, motorcycles, and automobiles. In addition to motor vehicles, he applied for and received patents for Stirling engines, ignition systems, planing machines, and pulleys.

He often promoted his inventions with grandiose and spurious claims, which would become a hallmark of his entrepreneurial schemes. Frequently he collected financial backing for his business ventures, but rarely (if ever) did his investors ever collect any dividends from his projects. He was regarded by many as a fraud on account of his unproven claims and business practices, yet he never spent any time in prison as a result of these accusations.

Pennington married three times. He died in Springfield, Massachusetts after contracting meningitis from falling down in the street.

== Innovations ==
E.J. Pennington is probably best known today for his pioneering motorcycles. He is sometimes credited with having invented the word "motorcycle"; he used the term as early as 1893. Pennington built and demonstrated his original motorcycle design in Milwaukee in 1895. Apparently not finding any backers for his idea he took it to England where he sold the patents for it to Harry John Lawson's The Great Horseless Carriage Company Limited in 1896 and joined that company's board of directors. Lawson had two more prototypes built but nothing further came from the design. Pennington made many claims for his motorcycle, but it is doubtful if any of them are true. The design was very primitive and a few journalists of the time expressed doubts as to whether or not it would even run, though The Autocar reported in June 1896: "...although the motor required some little alteration, the speed developed was said to have varied from thirty to forty miles per hour." Notable features were that the engine's cranks were connected directly to the rear axle, the cylinders had no cooling fins, and Pennington made use of balloon tires - an invention he is also often credited with.

After his motorcycle plans came to nothing, Pennington working in conjunction with Lawson attempted to design a car bearing his own name. Although payments were taken for orders of this design, apparently none were ever delivered. Journalists speculated that the car was a failure in design, and The Horseless Age remarked sarcastically that: "...the Pennington car, which is not a car, since it does not carry, but has to be carried..." was partly responsible for bad press about the automobile in general and Lawson's motor syndicate in England at the time. The only surviving example of this design is preserved by the National Motor Museum in Beaulieu, Hampshire, England.

Pennington returned to the U.S. and attempted to promote a few more schemes, as well as collect money he thought people owed him for his patents.

== See also ==
- Harry John Lawson

== Notes ==
- "Pennington". Grace's Guide to British Industrial History.
