= Blumfield =

Blumfield can refer to:

- Blumfield Township, Michigan (and Blumfield Corners) in Michigan
- Garrard & Blumfield, an English electric car manufactured from 1894 to 1896
- Caroline Blumfield, an English Labour and Co-operative politician
- Justin Blumfield, a former Australian rules football player
