= Clément-Garrard =

Clément-Garrard was a popular motorised cycle from 1902 that was manufactured in Birmingham, Great Britain, under licence from Adolphe Clément-Bayard's Clément-Gladiator industrial empire.

James Lansdowne Norton built Clément bicycle frames under licence, and used the Clément clip-on engine for his first Norton motorcycles.

== See also ==
- Adolphe Clément-Bayard#Motor manufacturing
- Garrard & Blumfield
