= Garrard (automobile) =

English automobile

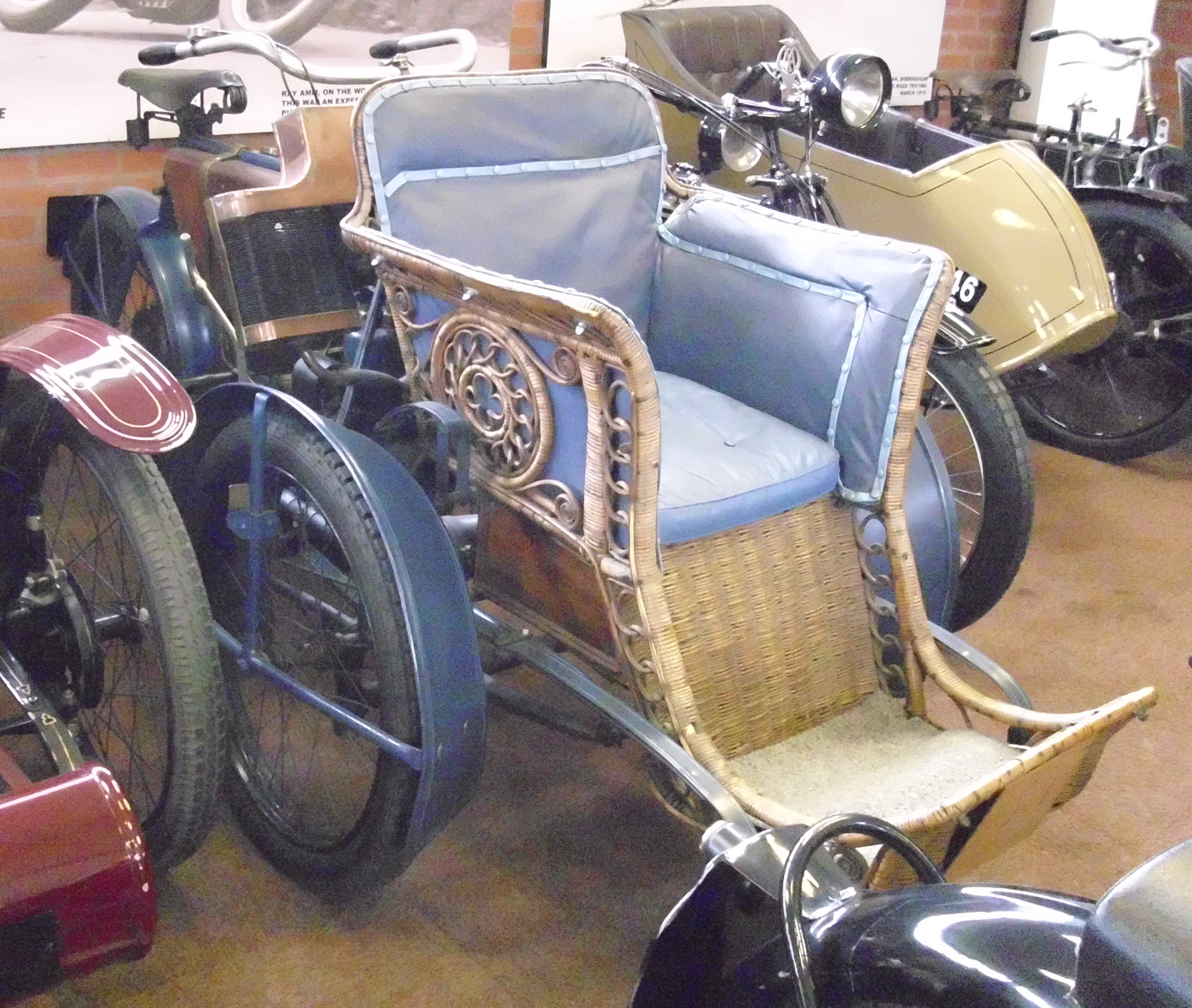
Garrard

The Garrard was an English automobile manufactured only in 1904 by Garrard Co. of Birmingham run by Charles Garrard.

In 1900 Garrard Co. was chiefly devoted to the manufacture of cycle chains and cycle wheel gearing. manufactured From the company which produced the Clément-Garrard motorcycle, it was described as a "Suspended Tri-car".

== See also ==
- Garrard & Blumfield
- List of car manufacturers of the United Kingdom
