= Adolphe Clément-Bayard =

French entrepreneur

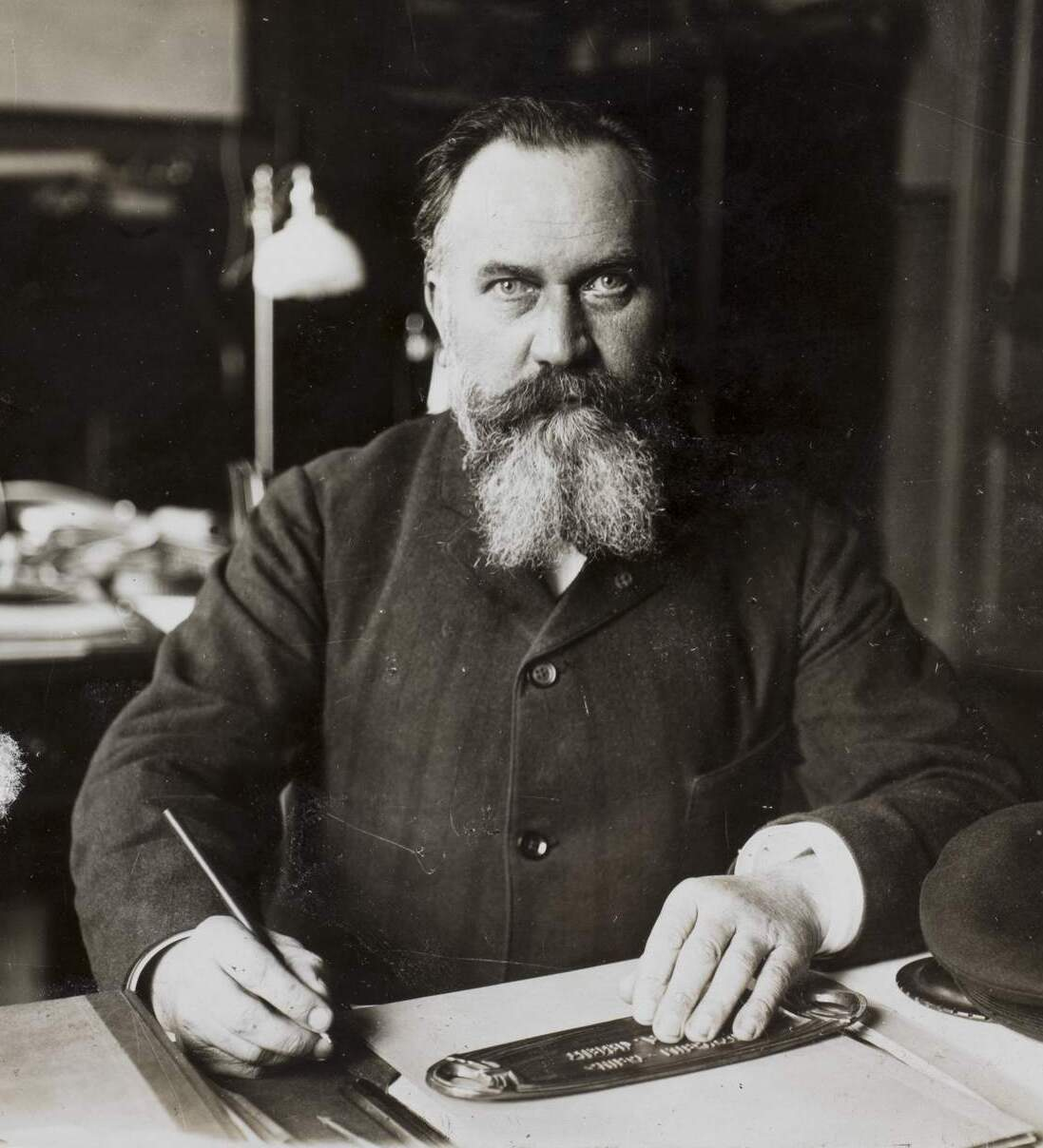
- Pictured in 1899
- Born: Gustave Adolphe Clément; 22 September 1855; Pierrefonds, Oise, France
- Died: 10 March 1928 (aged 72); Paris, France
- Resting place: Domaine du Bois d'Aucourt d'Adolphe Clément-Bayard at Pierrefonds
- Other names: Gustavus Adolphus Clément, Gustavus Adolphus Clément-Bayard
- Occupation: Entrepreneur
- Spouse: Céleste Angèle Roguet
- Children: Albert, Angèle, Jeanne and Maurice
- Awards: Commander of the Légion d'honneur

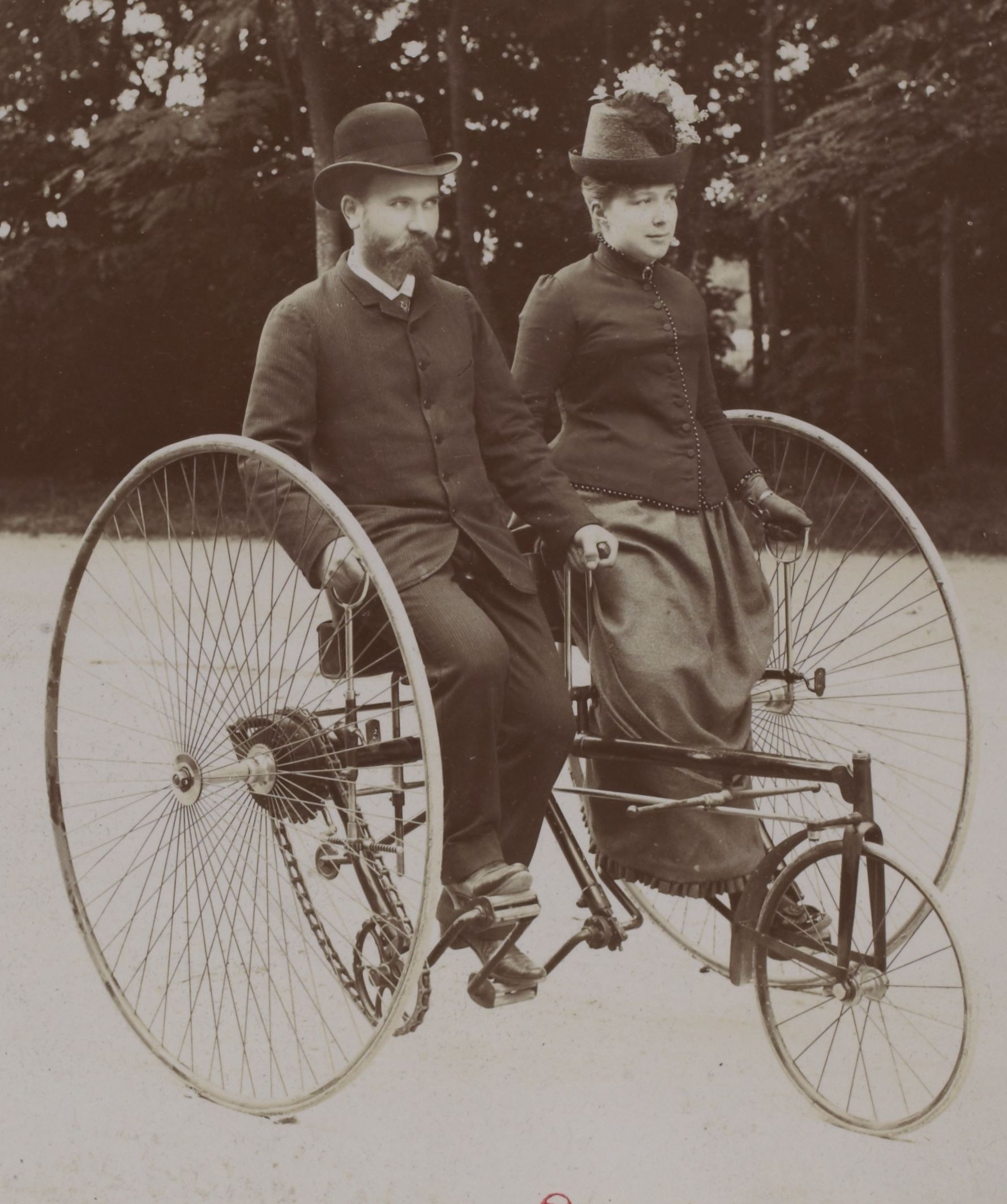
Clément and his wife, c. 1894

Gustave Adolphe Clément, known from 1909 Clément-Bayard (French pronunciation: [klemɑ̃ bajaʁ]; 22 September 1855 – 10 March 1928), was a French entrepreneur. Despite being orphaned, he became a blacksmith and a Compagnon du Tour de France. He later ventured into racing and manufacturing bicycles, pneumatic tyres, motorcycles, automobiles, aeroplanes and airships.

In 1894, he was a passenger in the winning vehicle in the world's first competitive motor event. Albert Lemaître's Peugeot was judged to be the winner of the Paris–Rouen 'Competition for Horeseless Carriages' (Concours des Voitures sans Chevaux).

As a result of selling the manufacturing rights to his Clément car, he added Bayard to the name of his new business. The company name honoured Chevalier Pierre Terrail, seigneur de Bayard, who saved the company's town of Mézières from an Imperial army during the Siege of Mézières in 1521.

In 1909, five years after the successful launch of the Clément-Bayard automobile brand, he applied for and obtained the consent of the Conseil d'Etat to change his surname (and that of his descendants) to Clément-Bayard. He was appointed a Commander of the Légion d'honneur in 1912.

Most of his manufacturing empire was destroyed by World War I – by German ransacking, by conversion to war production for France, and by the subsequent weak economic market. In 1922, the Clément-Bayard company was sold to André Citroën, and the factory at Levallois-Perret became the centre of 2CV manufacturing for the next 40 years.

== Personal life ==
=== Early life ===
Gustave Adolphe Clément, the son of a grocer, was born at rue du Bourg in Pierrefonds, Oise. He was the second of five children of Leopold Adolphus Clément and Julie Alexandrine Rousselle. His mother died when he was seven years old, and his father remarried but died two years later, when he was nine years old. For the next seven years, he was raised by his stepmother, who had remarried a school teacher. He studied at the primary school in Pierrefonds and then at the college of Villers-Cotterêts. At the age of 13, he began working in the family business by delivering groceries and later chose to apprentice as a farrier/blacksmith.

During the winter of 1871–1872, the 16-year-old Clément left Pierrefonds to travel around France as a Compagnon du Tour de France, an organization of craftsmen and artisans dating from the Middle Ages. He had saved 30 francs (circa 100 Euros in 2006) by doing multiple jobs for three years. He subsisted in each city by working in forges owned by the Compagnons du Tour de France, shoeing horses, repairing metal and doing any kind of work. He reached Paris in 1872, followed by Orléans and Tours, where he encountered 'Truffault cycles'. This led him to acquire 2 wooden cart wheels and build an iron bicycle frame.

Cycle racing had begun in 1869 (Paris–Rouen), so in 1873, J.M.M. Truffault lent the 18-year-old Clément an iron bicycle with solid rubber tires to race in Angers. He finished 6th and was exhilarated to read his name in the newspapers.

=== Family life ===
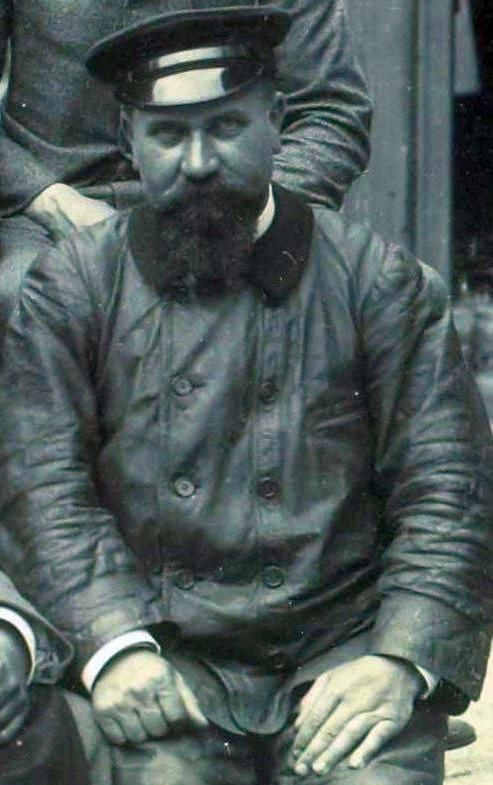

Clément married Céleste Angèle Roguet, and they had four children – Albert, Angèle, Jeanne and Maurice. Albert died while racing at the 1907 French Grand Prix. Angèle (1880–1972) was widowed from Albert Dumont, an engineer and director at the Levallois factory. Angèle then remarried Numa Joseph Edouard "Petit" Sasias (1882–1927), a Fonctionnaire aux Affaires Etrangères, ex-Secrétaire à la Présidence du Conseil, with whom she had one son. Jeanne became divorced from Fernand Charron, a racing driver and manager of the plant at Levallois-Perret, subsequently living alone. Maurice married Renée Hammond and had three children – Andrée, Jacqueline and Albert (nicknamed 'Billy' to avoid confusion and memories of his uncle Albert).

The Domaine du Bois d'Aucourt in Pierrefonds was originally a 17th-century hunting lodge of the 'Sun King' Louis XIV, which had been upgraded circa 1822. Located 1.5 kilometres (0.93 mi) west of both the Château de Pierrefonds and his own birthplace on the rue du Bourg, Clément bought the property around 1904 and employed architect Edward Redont to renovate and remodel it. Latterly, the Domaine du Bois d'Aucourt was used by his son Maurice, while Clément continued living at 35 Avenue du Bois de Boulogne, Neuilly-sur-Seine.

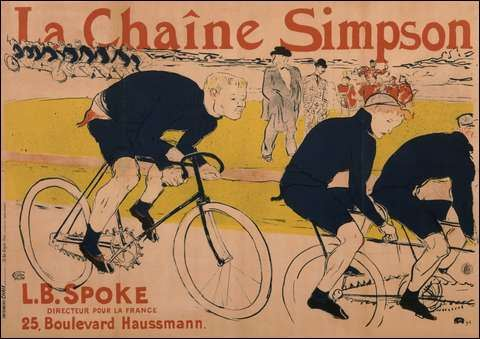
Henri de Toulouse-Lautrec publicity poster from the 1890s, Constant Huret riding with a Simpson chain behind the Gladiator tandem pacer at the Velodrome de la Seine.

=== Later life ===
By 1893, Clément owned the Vélodrome de la Seine near the site of the factory at Levallois-Perret. La plus belle et la plus vite piste du monde". It was managed by Tristan Bernard, who also managed the Vélodrome Buffalo, and its events were an integral part of Parisian life, being regularly attended by personalities such as Toulouse-Lautrec. Clément reportedly sold or converted this around 1900.

On achieving business success, he used the Latinate format of his name ('Gustavus Adolphus'), and he received permission from the Conseil d'État in 1909 to change his surname to 'Clément-Bayard'.

The death of his son Albert while racing at the 1907 French Grand Prix had a lasting effect on him. In 1913, he was elected as mayor of Pierrefonds and, on taking office, he ceded control of the Clément-Bayard company in 1914 to his son Maurice, who was passionate about aviation.

In 1928, he died of a heart attack while driving along the rue Laffitte to a meeting of a board of directors in Paris.

== Cycle manufacturing ==
In 1876, after 2 years of cycle racing, working and saving, Clément had enough money to start in business, so he opened a bicycle repair works in Bordeaux, aged 21. The next stage of his business plan was to move to Marseille, where he learned how to manufacture steel tubes for bicycles. The following year, he moved to Lyon and began manufacturing whole bicycles under the name 'Clément SA cycles'.

=== Clément cycles ===
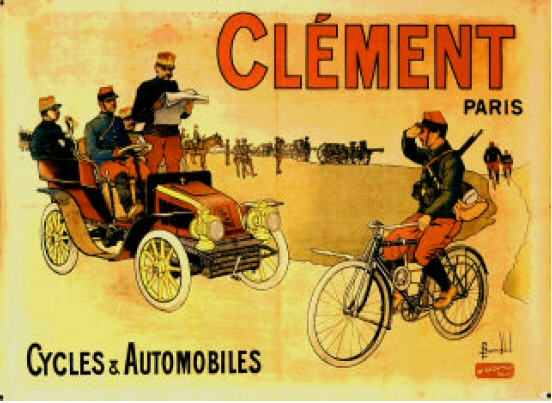
1903 poster Advertising Clement Cycles and Automobiles. (Musee Automobile de Reims)

The following year, circa 1878, Clément moved to Paris and opened a cycle business, A. Clément & Cie, at 20 rue Brunel near the Place de l'Etoile. Here, he also ran a cycling school and was competing in cycle races. In Paris, his business backers were monsieur de Graffenried and monsieur de Montgeron.

At the end of 1878, Clément partnered the cycling champion Charles Terront at the 'Six-Days' cycling event at the Agricultural Hall in London. He also opened a sales showroom at 31 rue du 4-Septembre in Paris and started a poster advertising campaign, a new concept.

In September 1879, Clément built an iron smelter at Tulle, in the Limousin, where there was a good supply of water power, but he did not have sufficient financing to make it viable. In addition, Tulle was too remote from Paris, so he had to sell the plant.

By 1880, the "Clément" cycle manufacturing business at rue Brunel had circa 150 employees building bicycles.(Image and description of 1880 Clément cycle) The machines were regarded as high quality, and by 1890, Clément was the leading cycle brand in France.

=== Clément-Gladiator cycles ===
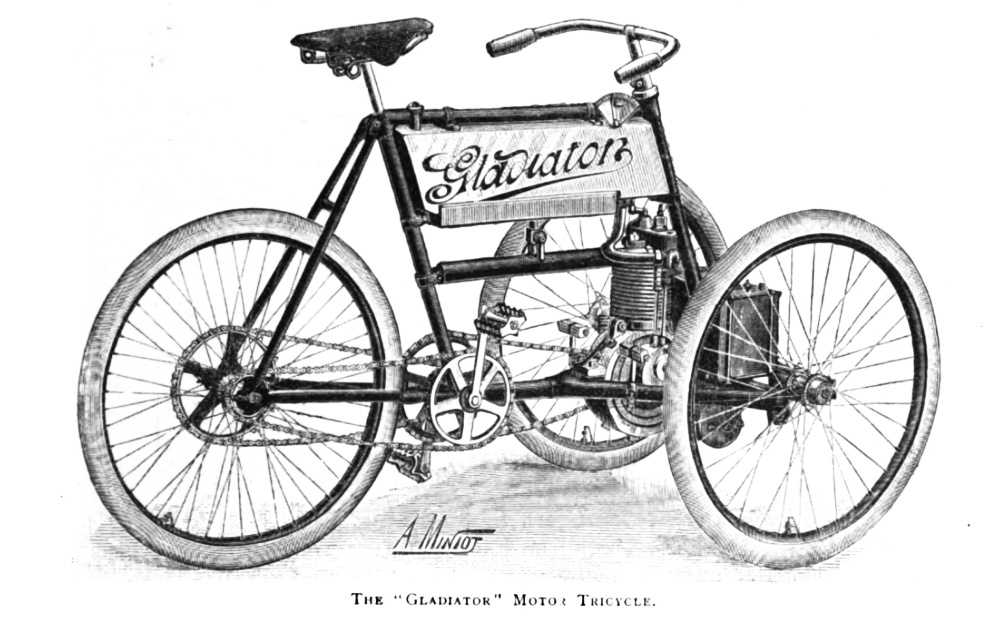
Gladiator tricycle (1895)

The Gladiator Cycle Company, a French bicycle manufacturer, was founded by Alexandre Darracq and Paul Aucoq in 1891 at Le Pré-Saint-Gervais in northeast Paris. Clément was a major investor in this venture.

In 1895, Gladiator introduced its first internal combustion, a naphtha powered tricycle.

In 1896, Clément (who held the extremely profitable manufacturing rights for Dunlop tyres in France) joined with a syndicate led by Dunlop's founder Harvey Du Cros to buy out the Gladiator Cycle Company, and they merged it into a major bicycle manufacturing conglomerate of Clément, Gladiator, and Humber & Co Limited, valued at 22 million francs (circa €60–80 million Euro in 2006).^{[a]}. The range of cycles was expanded with tricycles, quadricycles, and in 1902 a motorised bicycle, then cars and motorcycles.

Shortly after the purchase of Gladiator cycles in 1896, Clément began to build the new factory at Levallois-Perret in northwest Paris, which also produced various cars from 1898 (see below) and went on to build the Citroën 2CV for nearly forty years.

== Motorised cycle manufacturing ==
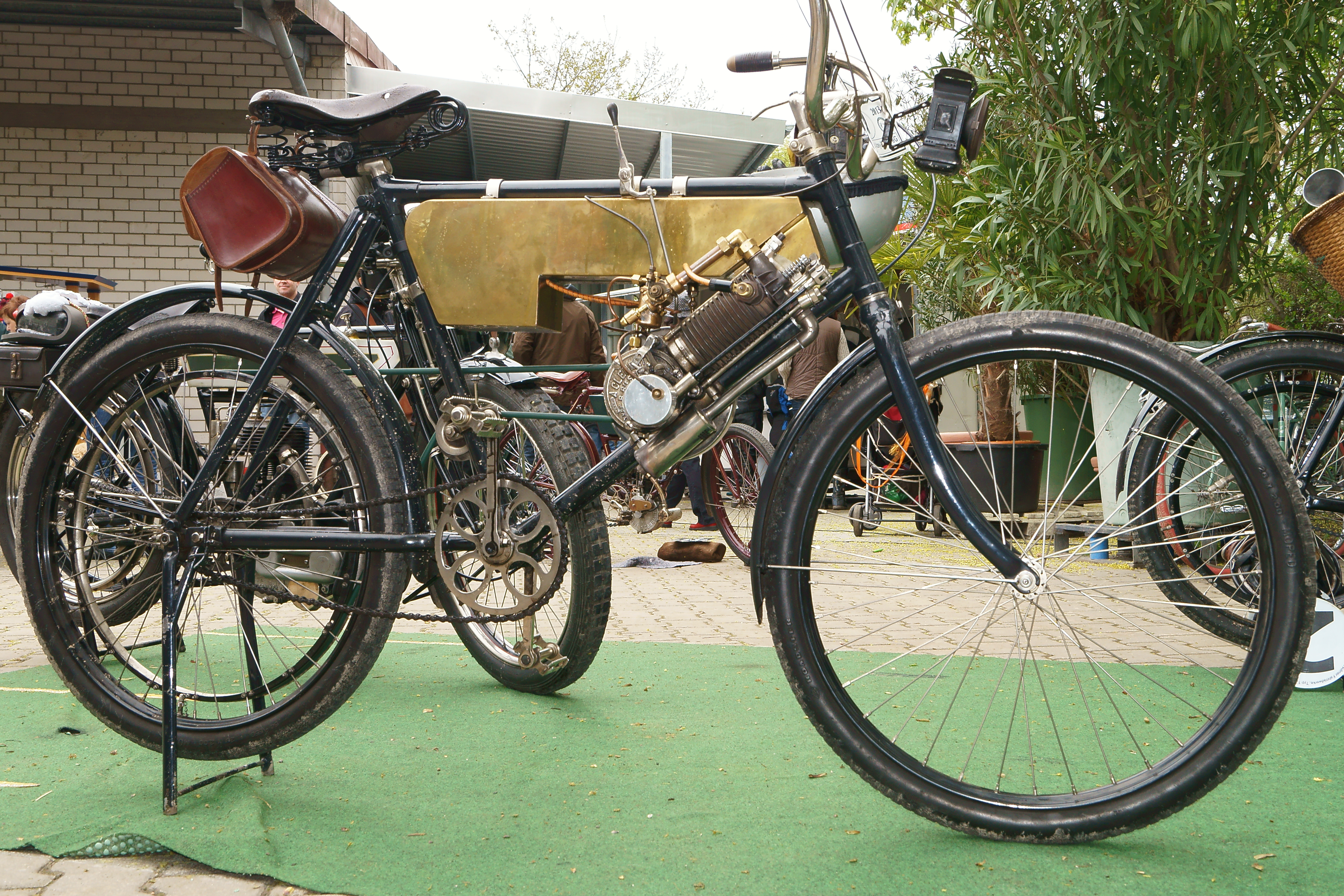
Clément autocyclette

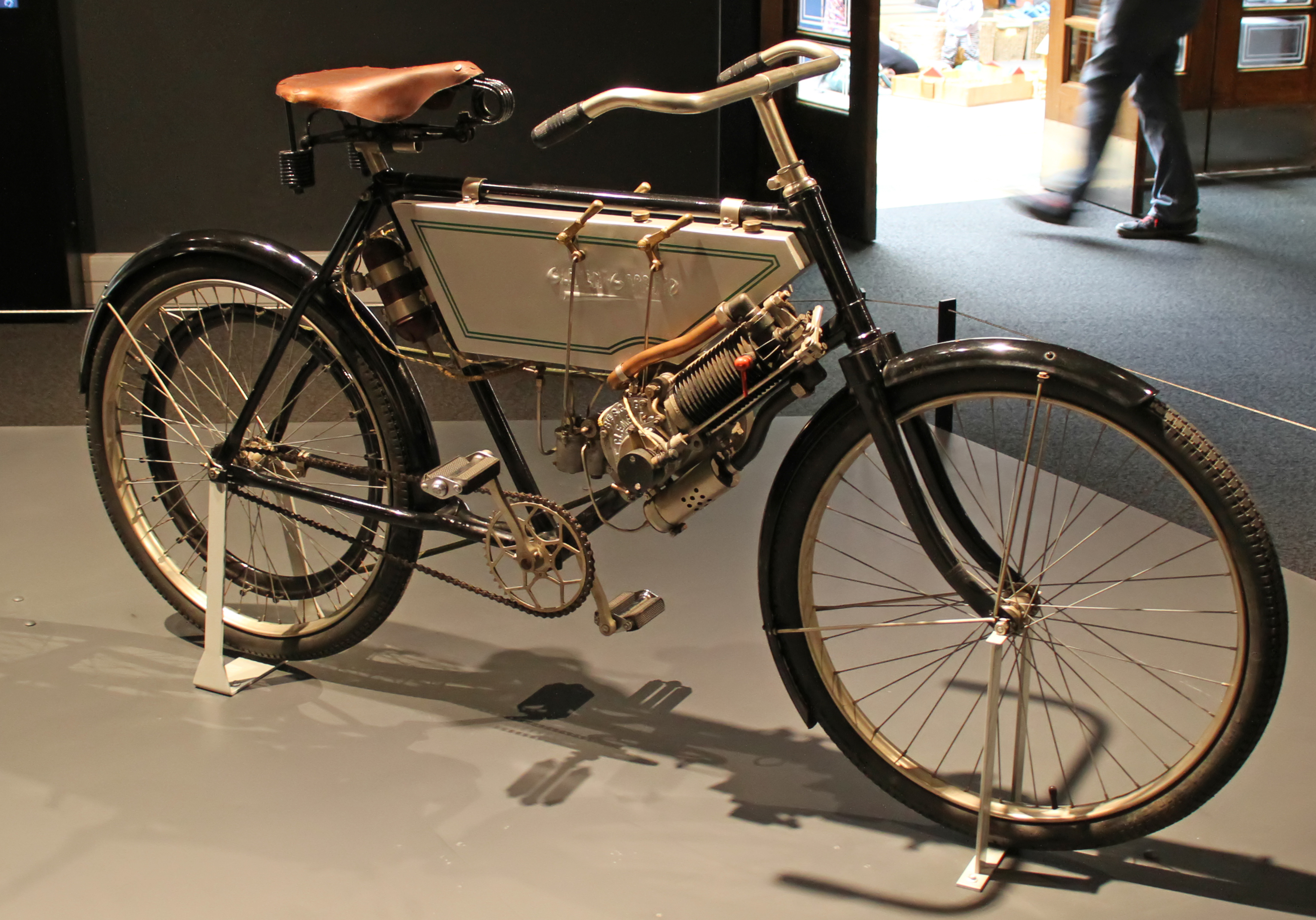
Clément-Garrard motorcycle for Britain and its colonies

=== Clément and Gladiator ===
From 1895, Clément cycles started to focus on motorized vehicles. In 1895, it introduced its first internal combustion vehicle, a naphtha powered tricycle. In 1902, they offered a motorized bicycle with a 142 cc engine bolted to the frame, using overhead valves and a detachable cylinder head; the inlet valve 'automatic' (controlled by engine suction), the exhaust valve mechanically operated. A coil-and-battery ignition was used, and a two-barrel carburetor controlled by small levers attached to the frame top tube. An external flywheel kept the crankcase very small, and a long belt from the engine pulley to a 'dummy' rim on the rear wheel was tensioned by a small 'jockey' pulley on the seat tube. The front brake pressed direct on the front tire, the rear was a 'coaster' brake activated by back-pedaling. This 'motorisation adaptation' was sold on both Clément and Gladiator cycles.

=== Clément-Garrard ===
In Britain, these popular motorised cycles were known as Clément-Garrards. James Lansdowne Norton built Clément bicycle frames under license, and used the Clément clip-on engine for his first Norton motorcycles.

== Tyre manufacturing ==
=== Dunlop ===
In 1889, Clément saw a Dunlop pneumatic tyre in London and acquired the French manufacturing rights for 50,000 francs. This success led to his millionaire status. The company he formed with a capital of 700,000 francs paid 100 per cent dividend in its first year of operation. Dunlop France, and occasionally Clément-Dunlop, was a regular entrant of motor racing and cycle racing teams.

=== Clément Pneumatics ===
Clément is reported to have begun manufacture of Clément Tyres in 1878 to fit to the early cycles, but the French identity was lost with the overwhelming success of his Dunlop pneumatics. After World War I, Clément Pneumatics was established in Italy and was a leading supplier of Clément Pneumatici bicycle tyres throughout much of the 20th century. A leading international manufacturer during the 1950s,1960s and 1970s, it was associated with racing cyclists such as Eddy Merckx, Jacques Anquetil, Felice Gimondi, and Ole Ritter. It was purchased by Pirelli in the 1980s and manufacturing was moved to Thailand until 1995 when Pirelli vacated the bicycle tyre market. Various licensing arrangements were of little consequence until, in 2010 the name was licensed to Donnelly Sports and the American, Don Kellogg, who recommenced manufacture in Thailand.

== Motor manufacturing ==
=== Clément-Gladiator motorcars ===
By 1898, the new Clément-Gladiator company was building cars and marketing them as both Cléments and Gladiators. Gladiators were imported into England by the Motor Power Company, which was co-owned by S. F. Edge and Harvey du Cros, founder of Dunlop. Financed by Harvey du Cros, Herbert Austin built Clement-Gladiator cars at Longbridge from early 1906, selling them as Austin cars.

From 1901, Clément-Gladiator cars were built at the Levallois-Perret factory, and by 1902, production was over 1,000 cars per annum, 800+ of which were sold in England.

After 1903, the Clément-Gladiator name continued to be used on the shaft-drive cars made at the Pre-Saint-Gervais factory, whilst chain-driven vehicles were marketed as Gladiators. The Clément name was dropped in 1907, and in 1909, another French manufacturer, Vinot et Deguingand, took over Gladiator and transferred production to Puteaux. At this time, the Pre-Saint-Gervais factory reverted to making bicycles.

=== Panhard et Levassor ===
In 1897, Clément invested one million francs (the equivalent of about three 3 million Euros at 2006 valuation) in Panhard & Levassor, part of their five million francs capitalisation. This established the main business and eventually led to the creation of the Clément-Panhard marque.

=== Clément-Bayard ===
Clément-Gladiator was divided in 1903 – Charles Chetwynd-Talbot founded the English arm Clément-Talbot Ltd, while Clément formed Clément-Bayard on a former military site at Mézières (now Charleville-Mézières). He chose the name Bayard in commemoration of Chevalier Pierre Terrail, seigneur de Bayard, who saved the town of Mézières in 1521. A statue of the Chevalier stood in front of the Mézières factory, and the image was incorporated into the company logo. After the split, both marques built very similar cars, but the specifications gradually diverged.

In 1922, the Clément-Bayard company was sold to André Citroën, in whom Clément also invested financially, and the factory at Levallois-Perret was the centre of 2CV manufacturing for the next 40 years.

=== Clément-Panhard ===
Clément was a director of Panhard-Levassor, and when the factory could not meet the production requirements for circa 500 units of the 1898 voiture légère ('dog cart') model, he undertook manufacture under licence at his factory in Levallois-Perret. It was designed by airship pioneer Commandant Arthur Krebs, of Panhard, and used a tubular chassis, centre-pivot steering, near-horizontal 3.5 hp (2.6 kW) rear-mounted engine with automatic inlet valve and hot-tube ignition, driving through a constant-mesh gear-train, and final drive by side chains; early models had no reverse gear.

=== Clément-Rothschild ===
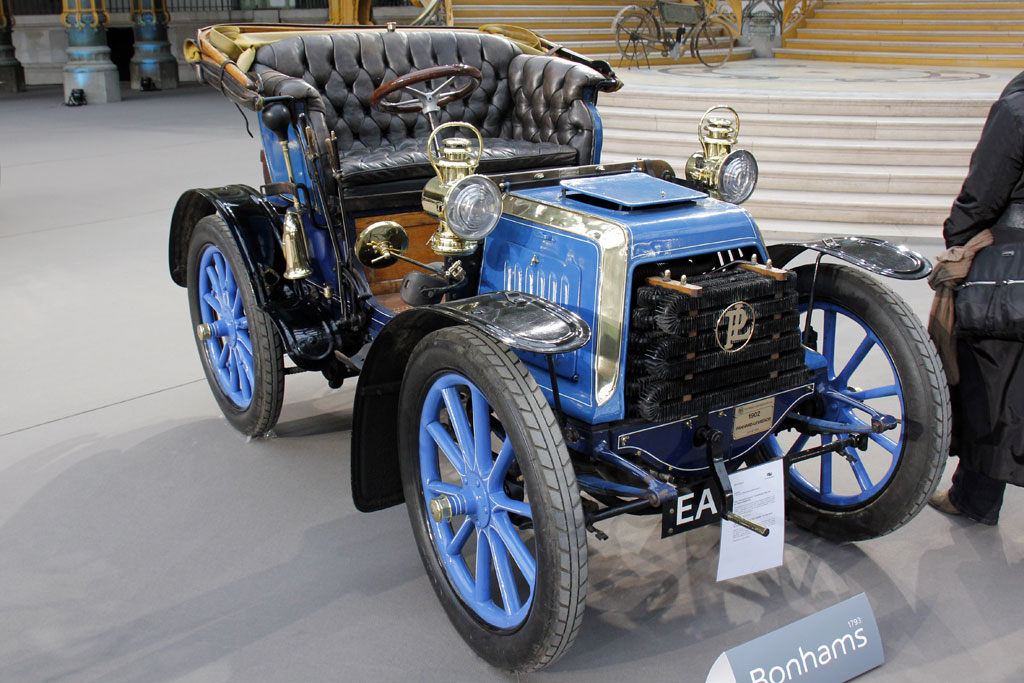
1902 Panhard-Levassor Twin Cylinder 7 hp Two Seater Clement-Rothschild

Around 1902, a series of Clément-Rothschild bodied automobiles, based on the Panhard-Levassor chassis, were produced by Carrosserie Clément-Rothschild at 33 Quai Michelet, Levallois-Perret, either adjacent to or in Clément's Levallois-Perret factory. There may have been two Rothschild coach-building enterprises active in Paris at that time, because J. Rothschild & Fils traded from 131 Avenue Malakoff but had been founded by Austrian-born Josef Rothschild in 1838 in Levallois-Perret, and was building automobile coachwork by 1894. By 1896, the business had been purchased by Edmond Rheims and Leon Auscher, and it pioneered aluminium composite coachwork.

=== Clément-Stirling and Stirling-Panhard ===
Some Clément-Panhards were exported to Great Britain, where they were variously sold as Clément-Stirling and Stirling-Panhard, by the Scottish coachbuilder Stirling.

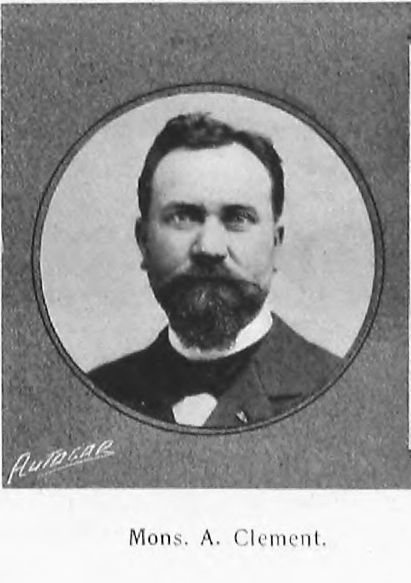

=== Clément-Talbot ===
Clément was a major shareholder in the company, along with Charles Chetwynd-Talbot, 20th Earl of Shrewsbury (who was chairman), A. Lucas and E. Lamberjack, both of France. Both marques (Clément-Bayard and Clément-Talbot) built very similar cars, but by 1907, the specifications diverged.

On 11 October 1902, Clément-Talbot was formally incorporated, and subsequently 5 acres (20,000 m^{2}) of land was purchased for a new factory in Ladbroke Grove, North Kensington, in west London, between the Great Western Railway line and the 'Edinburgh road' before it was renamed the 'Barlby road'. The factory was a high-status operation whose brick workshops used the latest saw-tooth roof line, glazed to maximise natural light. It was equipped with the most modern machine tools and the reception area was laid out like a miniature palace, marble Ionic columns, gilded frescoes and stained glass windows etched with the Shrewsbury coat of arms. The building is now known as Ladbroke Hall. (51.52318°N 0.22010°W)

The company traded as Clément-Talbot and the factory was titled Clément-Talbot, but after the first year of trading, the cars were always known as Talbots.

=== Diatto-Clément ===
In 1905, Clément created the Diatto-Clément Societa Anonima in partnership with Diatto, who had been coachbuilders in Turin since 1835. The cars, known as Torinos, were built in Turin under licence from Clément. The first cars were the 20-25HP which used 3,770cc four-cylinder engines. These were followed by 10-12HP (1,884cc two-cylinder) and 14-18HP (2,724cc four-cylinder) models. This series was a success and was followed by a six-cylinder model. In 1909, Clément left the business, and the company was renamed Societa Fonderie Officine Frejus.

=== Clément Motor Company (Britain) ===
In 1906, Clément set up the Clément Motor Company in Coventry, England, to build Gladiators under licence. It used the motto "Simply Clément, nothing else" to avoid confusion with Clément-Talbots, which by then were known only as Talbots. Various sources record that motorcars were manufactured and sold under the Clément brand between 1907 (1908) and 1914. The company is recorded as Clément Motor company Ltd., Coventry, Warwickshire.

== Motor racing ==
=== World's first motor race ===
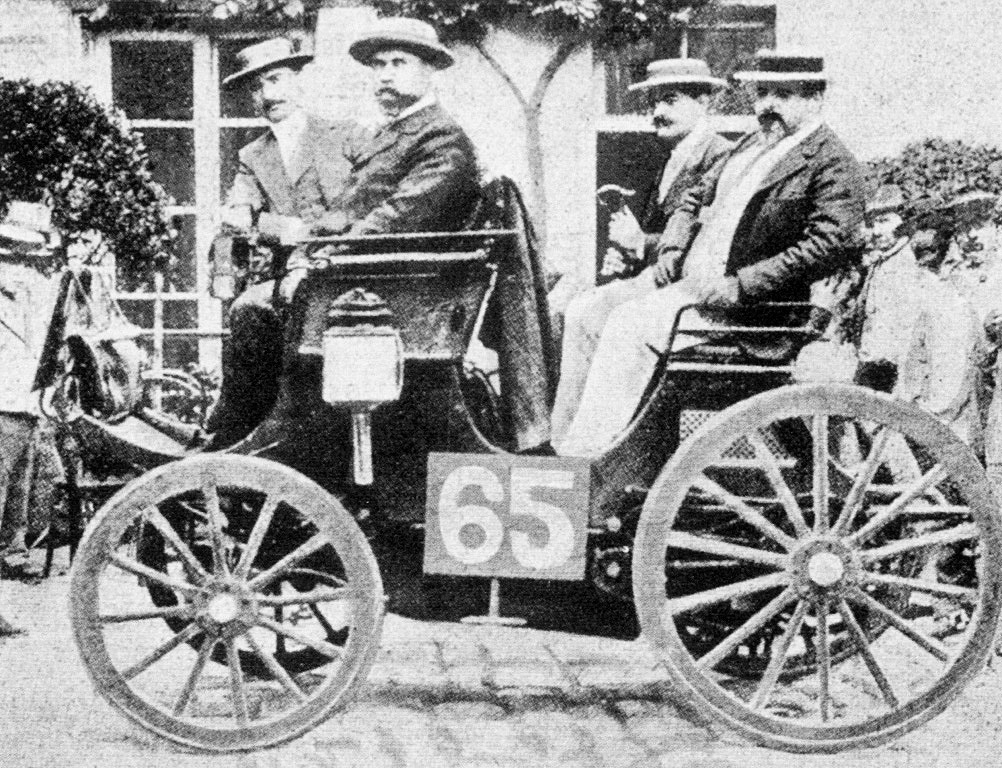
Albert Lemaître classified 1st in his Peugeot 3hp. Adolphe Clément-Bayard is the front seat passenger. (second from the left in the picture)

Clément had no direct involvement in the nascent motor industry until around 1897, but he was a passenger in Albert Lemaître's (Peugeot) that was judged to be the official winner of what is considered to be the world's first motor race on 22 July 1894, from Paris to Rouen.

The event was a publicity exercise organised by Pierre Giffard of Le Petit Journal newspaper and consisted of 69 cars starting a 50-kilometre (31 mi) selection event before 25 were allowed into the main event, the 127 kilometres (79 mi) race from Paris (Porte Maillot) to Rouen. Albert Lemaître completed the course in 9 hours 18 minutes at an average speed of 13.6 kilometres per hour (8.5 mph), followed by Auguste Doriot (Peugeot), René Panhard (Panhard) and Émile Levassor (Panhard). Count Jules-Albert de Dion reached Rouen 3’30" ahead of Albert Lemaître but as cars were judged on speed, handling and safety characteristics the official winners were Peugeot and Panhard. De Dion's steam car needed a stoker which was forbidden.

=== Paris–Berlin Trail ===
Clément was classified 20th in the 1901 Paris–Berlin Trail. Driving Panhard number 18, he completed the event in 21 hours 53 minutes and 38 seconds.

=== Clément-Bayard ===
Clément started building automobiles in 1903 and then started building racing cars in 1904. The racing team included Albert Clément, Jacques Guders, Rene Hanriot, Marc-Philippe Villemain, 'Carlès', "De la Touloubre" and A. Villemain, and Pierre Garcets.

=== 1904 season ===
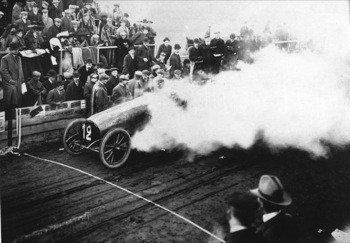
Albert Clément drives an 80-hp Clément-Bayard at the 1905 Vanderbilt Cup

Albert Clément finished 10th at L' Eliminatoires Françaises de la Coupe Internationale, held at the Forest of Argonne on 20 May 1904. This was an eliminating contest for the French entry into the Coupe Internationale (Gordon Bennett Race), where only three cars were allowed per country. He finished in 7 hours 10 minutes 52.8 seconds.

Albert Clément won the II Circuit des Ardennes des Voiturettes on 24 July 1904 at Bastogne in 4h 26m 52.6seconds, at an average speed of 53.91 km/h. He drove his Clément-Bayard into third place at the III Circuit des Ardennes race at Bastogne, on 25 July 1904. He finished second at the 1904 W.K. Vanderbilt Cup Race on Long Island on 8 October 1904.

=== 1905 season ===
Rene Hanriot finished tenth in 8 hours 23 minutes 39.6s at the II Eliminatoires Françaises de la Coupe Internationale at the Auvergne on 16 June. This was a qualifier for the Coupe Internationale (Gordon Bennett Race).

At the 1905 Vanderbilt Cup on Long Island, Clément drove an 80-hp Clément-Bayard (France #12) but suffered reliability problems.

Clément retired his Clément-Bayard after the first 166 km lap of the II Coppa Florio at Brescia Italy on 4 September 1905. His team-mate 'Carlès' retired after 2 laps.

=== 1906 season ===
Albert Clément driving a Clément-Bayard at the 1906 French Grand Prix

Clément-Bayard entered 3 cars for the inaugural 1906 French Grand Prix at Le Mans where Albert Clément finished third in his 100Hp machine. He completed the 1,238 km event in 12 hours 49 minutes 46.2seconds. Clément lead the race at the end of laps 2 and 5 on the second day. Punctures were common and Michelin introduced a detachable rim, saving 11 minutes over manually replacing the tyre. This enabled Felice Nazzaro (FIAT) to take second place from Clément.

Albert Clément finished 6th in the V Circuit des Ardennes on 13 August 1906 at Bastogne. He completed the 7 lap 961 km race in 6 hours 2 minutes 55.2 seconds in a 100Hp Clément-Bayard. His team-mates A. Villemain and Pierre Garcet finished 11th and 12th.

At the 1906 Vanderbilt Cup, Clément finished 4th driving a 100 hp (75 kW) Clément-Bayard (France #15) and completing the ten laps averaging 59.0 mph (95.0 km/h).

=== 1907 season ===
Albert Clément died while practising for the 1907 French Grand Prix on 17 May. Of the three other Clément-Bayard entries, Pierre Garcet and Elliott Shepard, finished seventh and eighth respectively. Clément's car was entered by 'Alezy', who retired after four laps.

=== 1908 season ===
The company entered three cars for the 1908 French Grand Prix, using a 12,963 cc six-cylinder overhead camshaft engine. Victor Rigal finished fourth.

=== Other events ===
In 1905, Clément-Bayard won the Coupe de Calais and 'finished well' at the Course de Dourdan. In both 1907 and 1908, Clément-Bayard won the Coupe de l'Automobile-Club de Cannes, and in 1908, it also won the Tour de France Automobile.

== Aeroplane manufacture ==
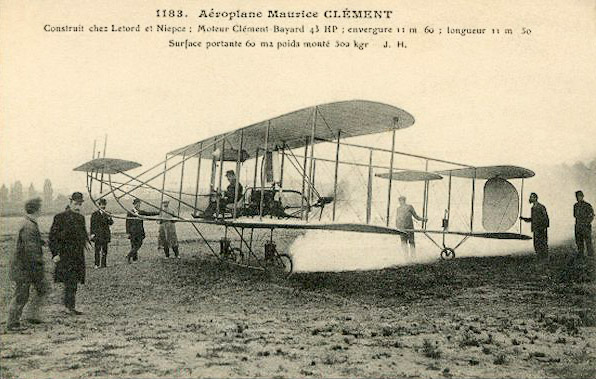
Maurice Clément-Bayard at the controls of the 1910 Clément-Bayard biplane

Clément-Bayard was an early French manufacturer of aircraft engines and lighter-than-air vehicles, with the earliest flights occurring in 1908. Clément-Bayard created the world's first series production aircraft.

The company worked with Louis Capazza to produce the 'planeur (glider) Bayard-Clément' that was unveiled in L'Aérophile on 15 May 1908.

The company also started working with Alberto Santos-Dumont in 1908 to build his Demoiselle No 19 monoplane that he had designed to compete for the Coupe d'Aviation Ernest Archdeacon prize from the Aéro-Club de France. The plane was small and stable, but they planned a production run of 100 units, built 50 and sold only 15 for 7,500 francs for each airframe. It was the world's first series production aircraft. By 1909 it was offered with a choice of 3 engines, Clément-Bayard 20 hp; Wright 4-cyl 30 hp (Clément-Bayard had the license to manufacture Wright engines); and Clément-Bayard 40 hp designed by Pierre Clerget. It achieved 120 km/h.

Pierre Clerget designed a range of Clément-Bayard aircraft engines including a 7-cylinder supercharged radial, the 4-cyl 40 hp used on the Demoiselle, a 4-cyl 100 hp used on 'Hanriot Etrich' monoplanes, and a V8 200 hp airship engine.

In 1910, the Clément-Bayard Monoplane No. 1 was introduced at the Paris show.

By 1912, Clément-Bayard built a biplane plus three different models of horizontally opposed aircraft engines.

In November 1912, The Clément-Bayard Monoplane No. 5 was introduced. It was powered by a Gnome rotary engine which had 7 cylinders and produced 70 hp (52 kW). The pilot sat in an aluminium and leather tub.

In 1913, a three-seater biplane was introduced as part of the military project, the Clément-Bayard No. 6. It was configured for two observers in front of the pilot, and was powered by either a 4-cyl 100 hp (75 kW) Clément-Bayard or 4-cylinder Gnome engine.

In 1914, Clément-Bayard produced a steel scouting monoplane powered by either an 80 hp (60 kW) motor or a 100 hp (75 kW) Gnome et Rhône engine. The nickel steel armour was designed for protection against rifle fire.

== Airship manufacture ==
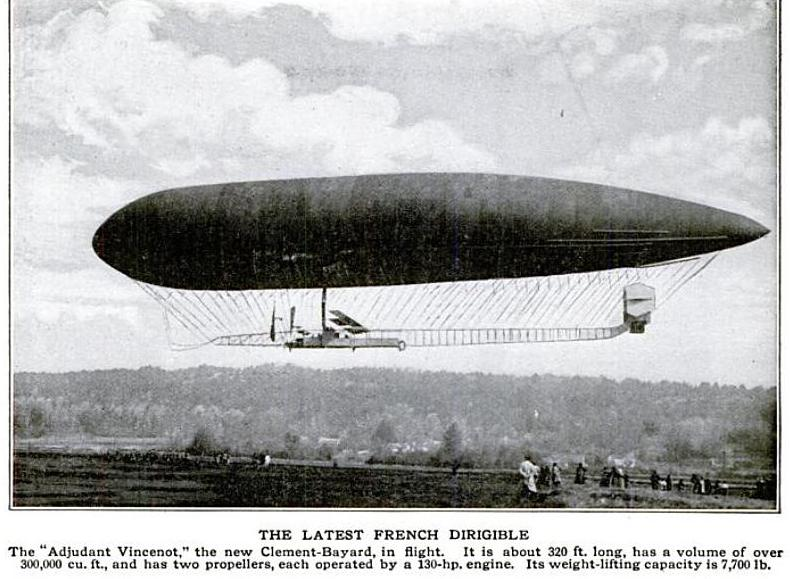
Clément-Bayard Airship No 1, The "Adjudant Vincenot", c. 1910. Caption from Popular Mechanics magazine, 1910.

In 1908, Astra Clément-Bayard began manufacturing airships at a new factory in La Motte-Breuil in response to a French Army decision to commence airship operations.

The Clément-Bayard No.1 airship was offered to the French government but was too expensive so it was bought by Tsar Nicholas II for the Russian army.

In 1910, the Clément-Bayard No.2, piloted by Maurice Clément-Bayard, was the first airship to cross the Channel, travelling over 380 km in 6 hours. The army ordered 3 copies.

The airship hangar in La Motte-Breuil is still maintained by Clément-Talbot Ltd.

=== Clément-Bayard dirigibles ===
Seven Clément-Bayard airships were completed.

- Clément-Bayard No.1 was 56.25 metres long, 10.58 metres wide, 3,500 m3, powered by 2 Clément-Bayard 115 cv engines. First flew on 28 October 1908.
- N° 2 was 76.50 metres long, 13.22 metres wide, 7,000 m3, powered by 2 Clément-Bayard 120 cv engines. Top speed 54 km/h. First flew on 1 June 1910.
- N° 3 Dupuy de Lôme, 89 metres long, 13.5 metres wide, 9,000 m3, powered by 2 Clément-Bayard 120 cv engines. First flew on 1 May 1912.
- N° 4 Adjudant Vincenot, 88.5 metres long, 13.5 metres wide, 9,800 m3, powered by 2 Clément-Bayard 120 cv engines. Top speed 49 km/h. First flew in 1911.
- Adj Vincenot modified, 87.3 metres long, 13.5 metres wide, 9,800 m3, powered by 2 Clément-Bayard 120 cv engines. Top speed 53 km/h. First flew on 13 August 1913.
- N° 5 livré à la Russie, 86 metres long, 13.5 metres wide, 9,600 m3, powered by 2 Clément-Bayard 130 cv engines. First flew on 9 February 1913.
- Montgolfier, 73.5 metres long, 12.2 metres wide, 6,500m3, powered by 2 Clément-Bayard 90 cv engines. Top speed 60 km/h. First flew on 31 July 1913.

== Factories used by Adolphe Clément-Bayard ==
- In September 1879, Clément built an iron smelter in Tulle, in the Limousin where there was a good supply of water power, but he did not have sufficient finance to make it viable and Tulle was too remote from Paris, so he had to sell the plant.
- In 1880 he moved his small cycle business and established the "Clément" cycle manufacturing business at 20 Rue Brunel, Place de l'Étoile, in central Paris, where 150 employees built bicycles.
- The Gladiator Cycle Company built bicycles at Le Pré-Saint-Gervais in north east Paris.

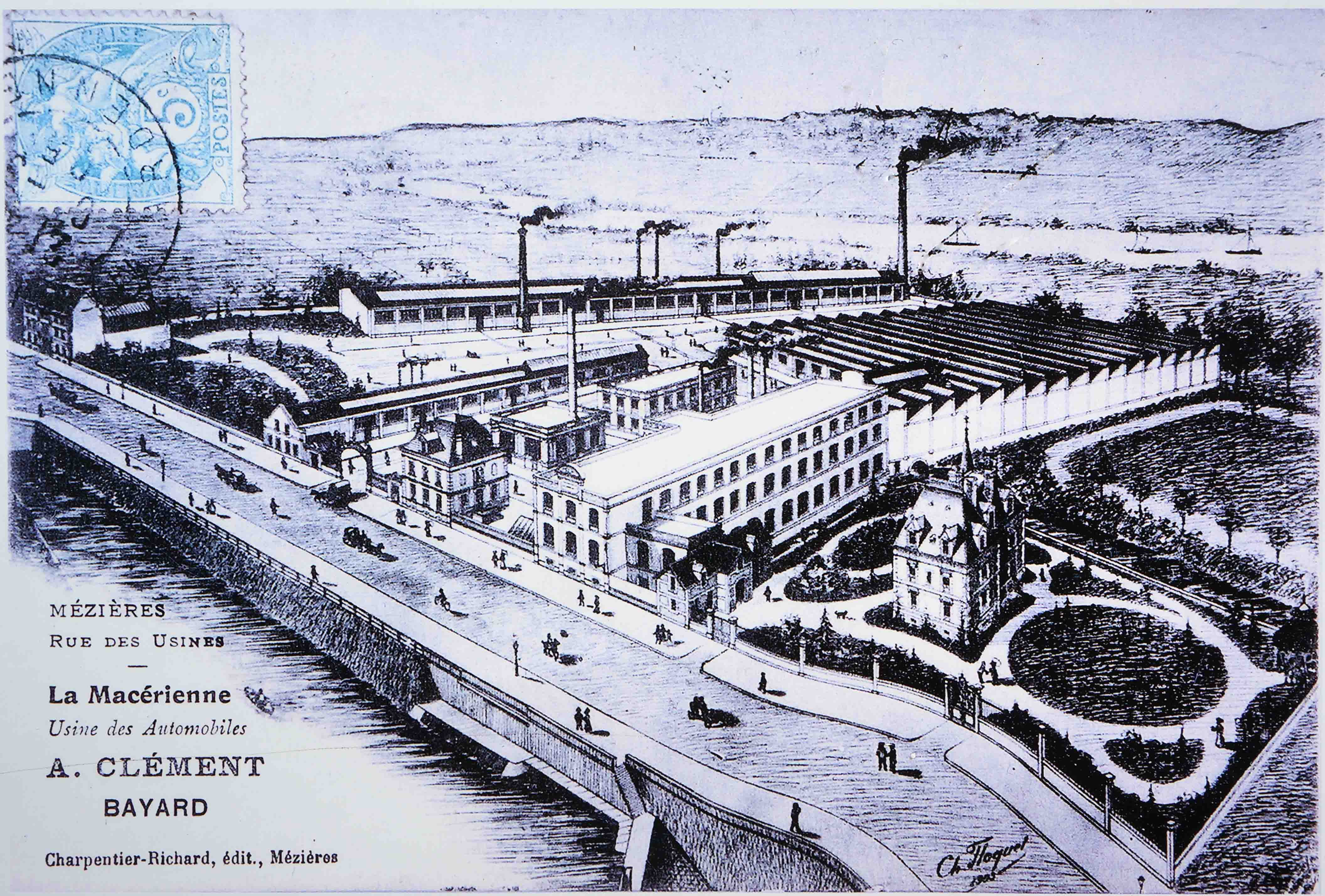
La Macérienne, Faubourg Saint-Julien, Mézières, 1913

- In 1894, he started construction work on a former military site in the Faubourg Saint-Julien at Mézières, to build a new factory, which would become known as La Macérienne. Clément personally supervised the work remotely using photographs taken every day and visiting the site once a week. By 1897 it was producing components and spokes for the Gladiator Cycle Company. It covered 15,000 m2 and using a hydraulic turbine power plant, a steam room, large machine hall, a foundry, a workshop for the nickel processing, the operation with the manufacturing of nuts and spokes on a bike. The factory building still exists but in the spring of 2006 it was transformed into a cultural center.
- After World War I, Maurice Clément-Bayard undertook to rescue La Macérienne from the physical, social and commercial ravages of war. He visited the United States and by 1925 had a contract to manufacture for the 'Allied Machinery Company' (Almacoa hoists and Cletrac tractors). By 1928, it produced Almacoa excavators, tractors and forklifts, plus Cletrac crawler tractors were exclusive to Clement-Bayard for Europe and North Africa.
- Clément-Bayard was situated at the Boulevard de la Saussaye 57 in Neuilly in west Paris. Between 1899 and 1922, three wheelers and cars were built there.
- Shortly after the purchase of Gladiator cycles in 1896 Adolphe Clément began to build the new factory at Levallois-Perret in north west Paris. This produced cycles and various cars from 1898, (Clément-Panhard, Clément-Gladiator from 1901, Clément-Bayard from 1903), and went on to build various Citroën models including the Citroën 2CV for nearly forty years from 1948 to 1988. From August 1914 it was dedicated to wartime production.
- On 11 October 1902, Clément-Talbot was formally incorporated, and subsequently 5 acres (20,000 m^{2}) of land was purchased for a new factory in Ladbroke Grove, North Kensington in west London, between the Great Western Railway line and the 'Edinburgh road' before it was renamed 'Barlby road'. The factory was a high status operation whose brick workshops used the latest saw-tooth roof line, glazed to maximise natural light. It was equipped with the most modern machine tools and the reception area was laid out like a miniature palace, marble Ionic order, gilded frescoes and stained glass windows etched with the Shrewsbury coat of arms. It is now known as 'Ladbroke Hall'.
- In 1908, 'Astra Clément-Bayard' began manufacturing airships at a new factory in La Motte-Breuil.
- In 1911, Adolphe built a pottery factory at Pierrefoids.

== Dreyfus affair ==
The Dreyfus affair split France at the end of the 19th century over the guilt or innocence of a soldier, Alfred Dreyfus, who had been convicted of selling secrets to the Germans. In 1900, Clément-Bayard was one of the leading anti-Dreyfusard industrialists, along with comte Jules-Albert de Dion, who cancelled all advertising in the Dreyfusard newspaper Le Vélo and started a rival daily sports paper, L'Auto-Velo. The roots of both the Tour de France cycle race and L'Équipe newspaper, result from Clément's hostile anti-Dreyfusard stance. The Dreyfus affair was eventually concluded with the official exoneration of Dreyfus (as an innocent person who had been framed). With the end of official inquiries, it may be said that Clément-Bayard and de Dion had been wrong for a decade.

== War activity ==
By 1910, Clément-Bayard vociferously warned of Germany's warlike ambitions, and in 1912, he was assaulted by a hostile German mob. Thus, when Germany invaded France, he was a marked man. In September 1914, the Germans reached the outskirts of Pierrefonds and shelled the Domaine du Bois d'Aucourt, although by then, it was being looked after by Carlo Bugatti, the Art Nouveau furniture and jewellery designer and father of Ettore Bugatti, who also lived in the town. Clément remained in Paris with his family.

Clément ceded control of Clément-Bayard to his son Maurice in 1914 before the start of the war, but the consequences for the company were disastrous. The La Macérienne factory at Mézières was lost to the Germans in the opening weeks, as were his home, mayoral town and factories at Pierrefonds. The industrial machinery was shipped back to Germany, and the forges, foundries and smelter were destroyed. La Macérienne was gutted and used as an indoor riding school for German officers.

Automobile production at Levallois-Perret in Paris was suspended in August 1914, and the factory was turned over to war production, military equipment and military vehicles, aero engines, airships and planes.

== Bank of Ardennes ==
In 1922, Clément-Bayard was appointed director and vice-president of the new Bank of Ardennes, which was established in Charleville on 12 April 1922.

== Honours, death and commemoration ==
In 1912, Clément-Bayard was appointed a Commander of the Légion d'honneur.

In 1928, he died of a heart attack while driving to a meeting of a 'Board of Directors' in Paris.

His tomb is located at the Domaine du Bois d'Aucourt d'Adolphe Clément-Bayard at Pierrefonds, which has been a protected Historic Monument since 2004.

The rue Clément-Bayard runs through the centre of Pierrefonds, Oise.

In 2005, a 50 CHF gold coin was minted to commemorate the centenary of the Geneva Motor Show, with the theme "Clément 1905"

== See also ==
- Société Astra (Société Astra des Constructions Aéronautiques)
- Arthur Constantin Krebs

== Notes ==
a. By 1896, the title of Humber cycles had been acquired by entrepreneur and fraudster Harry Lawson. The cycle factory of Thomas Humber at Beeston, Nottinghamshire started adding the soubriquet 'Genuine Humber' to its logo.

== Gallery ==
- Pdf about Adolphe Clément-Bayard, (French) containing 95 images, posters and diagrams of cycles, cars, planes, airships, houses and factories.
- Flickr, Description and image of Clément-Talbot works at Ladbroke Grove
- Internal image of 'Ladbroke Hall', once the Clément-Talbot works at Ladbroke Grove
