= Garrard & Blumfield =

1890s English electric car manufacturer

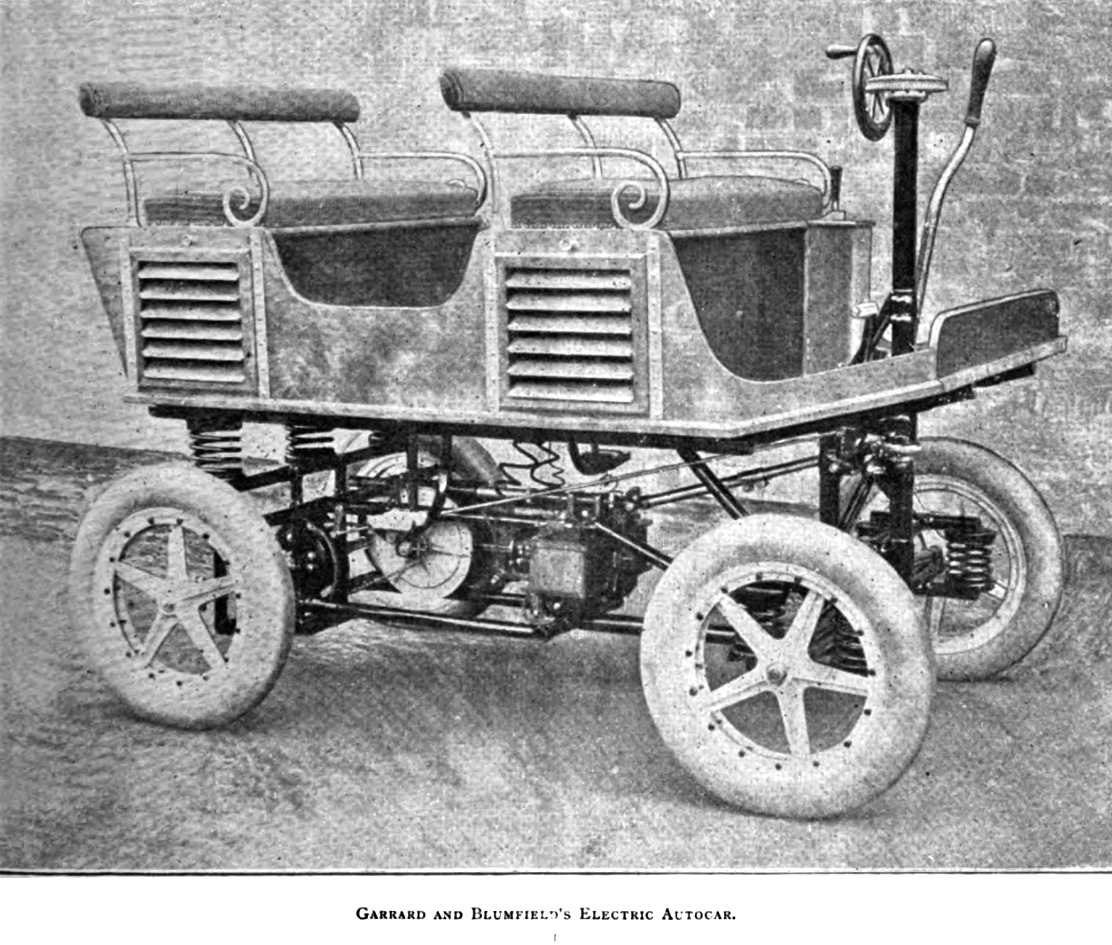
Garrard & Blumfield (1895)

The Garrard & Blumfield or Blumfield & Garrard was an English electric car manufacturer from 1894 to 1896. The company is presumed to have been founded by C. R. Garrard and T. W. Blumfield.

The vehicles were built for them by Taylor, Cooper and Bednell of Coventry, were equipped with 4-inch pneumatic tyres and described as "neat and well-fitted".

In 1896 Garrard & Blumfield were subsumed into Harry J. Lawson's The Great Horseless Carriage Company.

== T. W. Blumfield ==
Thomas William Blumfield (born Southampton, 30 May 1869) worked as a Cycle Examiner, Turner and Fitter. In 1891 he lodged at Brick Kiln Lane, Coventry with Isaac Woolgat, a Bicycle Polisher, and his family.

In 1896 he worked for Humber Limited in Coventry, and supervised the construction of the prototype of the first motorcycle which used an E. J. Pennington engine.

He was married with three children, and died in Kings Heath, Birmingham, in 1956.

== Blumfield and Garrard ==
On 14 December 1893 and 31 March 1894, Blumfield and Garrard were granted a patent for 'Improvements in electric motor carriages'.

On 27 July 1894 The Engineer (page 88) published details of an electric carriage with 4-inch pneumatic tyres that was built for them by 'Taylor, Cooper and Bednell' of Coventry and described as "neat and well-fitted". Details of the vehicle were also published in The Cyclist of June 1894.

=== Paris-Rouen 1894 ===
In early 1894 they paid their 10 franc entry to the Le Petit Journal Competition for Horseless Carriages (Concours du 'Petit Journal' Les Voitures sans Chevaux) that was run from Paris to Rouen in France. They did not show up at the qualification events in July 1894.

=== Demise ===
In 1896 'Blumfield and Garrard' were subsumed into Harry J. Lawson's 'Great Horseless Carriage Co' whose objective was to gather the patent rights held by Daimler, de Dion-Bouton, Bollee, Kane-Pennington, Garrard and Blumfield, Serpollet systems, and British Motor Syndicate.

== C. R. Garrard ==
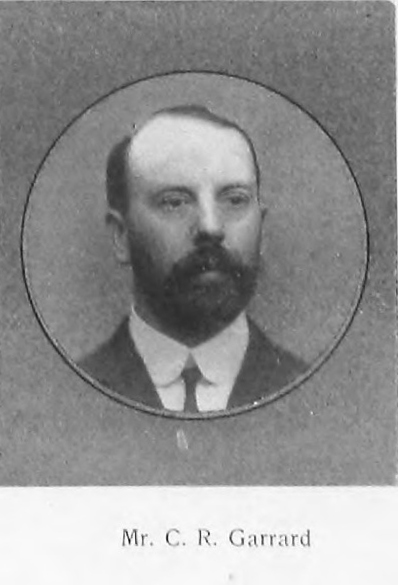

Charles Riley Garrard (1855–1955) was born in London. He was a certified Member of the Institute of Mechanical Engineers, (M.I.M.E.) and president of the Cycle Engineers' Institute.

Garrard constructed an electric carriage in 1893 in co-operation with T.W. Blomfield.

Garrard worked in Paris building Gladiator motor tricycles in 1894–3. There he encountered Adolphe Clément of Clément Cycles.

Garrard was managing director of the Garrard Co. who built Clément-Garrard motorised cycles from 1902 to 1905 in Birmingham, Great Britain, under licence from Adolphe Clément's Clément-Gladiator.

In early 1904 Garrard showed a forecar tandem tricycle where the passenger sat between the front wheels and the driver sat behind. The water-cooled engine was rated at 4 hp and connected to the three-speed gearbox by a clutch. The final drive was by propeller shaft to the single rear wheel. It had leaf-spring front suspension and pivoted-fork at the rear. It was demonstrated at a hill-climb in 1904 but was not developed.

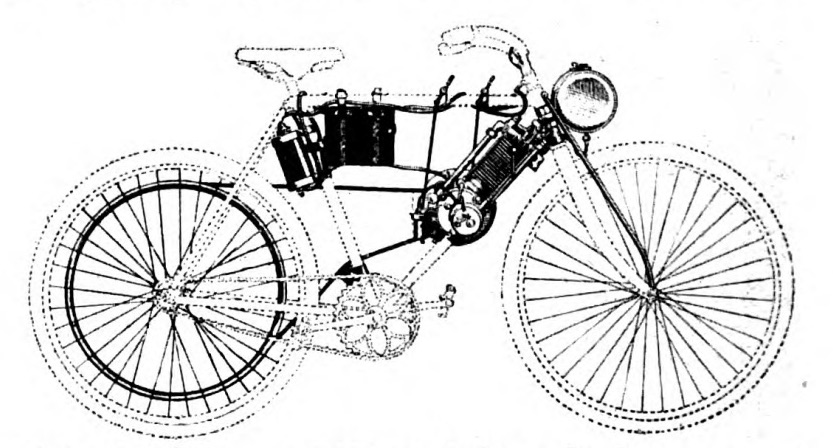
Garrard motor set installed on a bicycle 1902

=== Garrard Manufacturing Company Limited ===
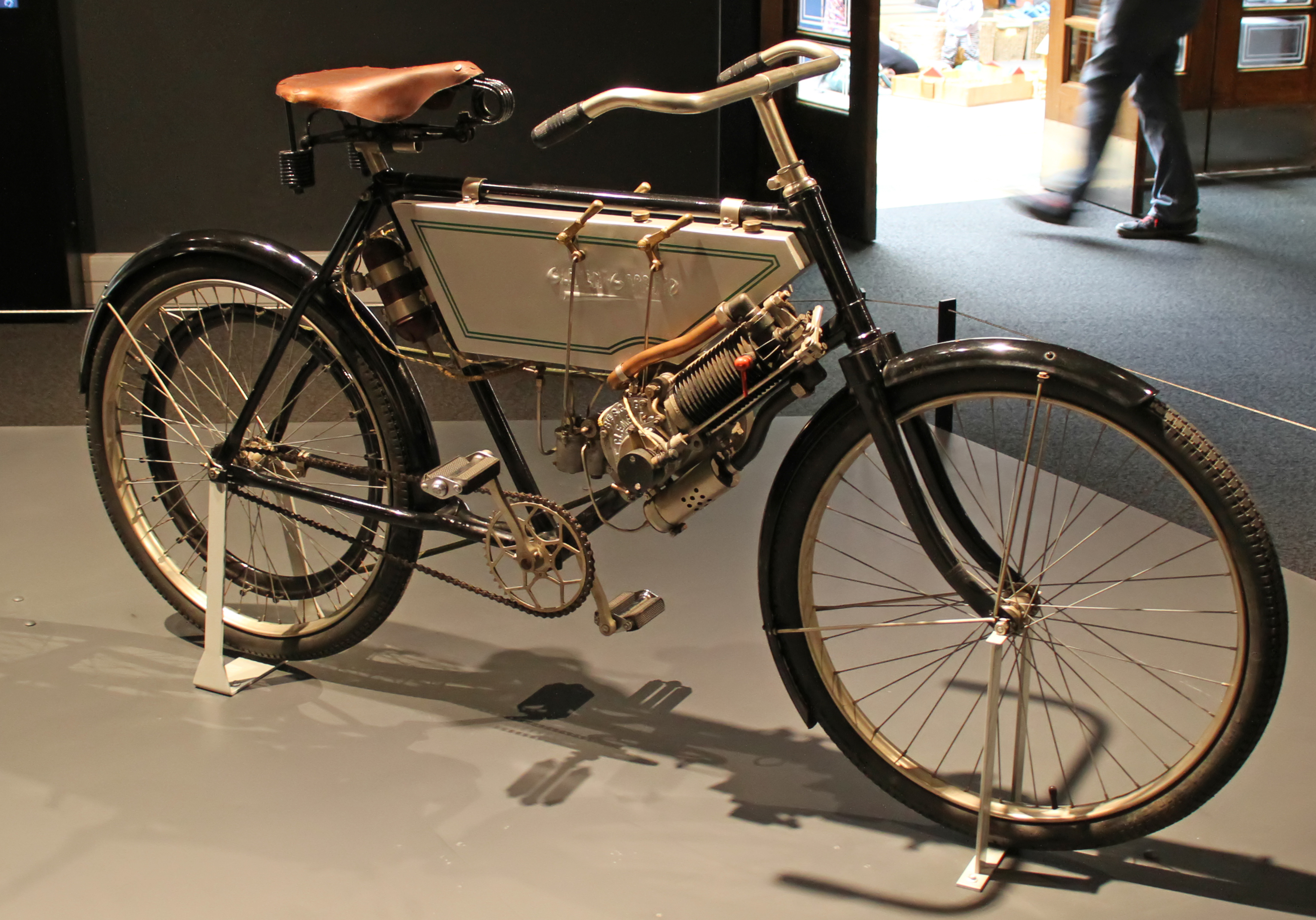
Clément-Garrard motorcycle, re-badged Clément autocyclette

Garrard Manufacturing Company of Magneto Works, Ryland Street, Birmingham announced in February 1902 their complete motor sets suitable for fitting to existing strong roadster bicycles. The complete set was said to weigh 25 lb (11 kg) to 30 lb (14 kg), the motor alone 15.5 lb (7.0 kg). It was reported to develop 1 horsepower at 1,900 revolutions per minute. Particular features reported were: an external flywheel, a special method of opening the valves, a compression cock and a contact-maker or "points" made of a notched cam and a trembler. A platinum screw is pressed to the back of the trembler. Garrard superintended the erection of the Clément-Talbot Automobile Works in Ladbroke Grove, London, in 1903.

In November 1905 he applied for a British Patent 24650 providing the address 12 St Charles Square, North Kensington very close to the location of Clément-Talbot's works. He described himself in 1906 as works manager and motor-car chassis designer of Clément-Talbot Limited.

By 1922 he had moved to Sydenham SE26 and had two businesses, Duplex and General Bearings Co manufacturing ball-bearings and C R Garrard Limited motor and general engineers (incorporated 1917 to own Duplex Bearings and the motor and general engineers business) at Winchester Works in High Street Sydenham. Prior to the outbreak of war in 1914 German manufacturers had an effective monopoly of manufacture of ball bearings.

Garrard died in 1955 aged 99 years.

== See also ==
- Garrard (automobile)
- Clément-Garrard automobile
- James Lansdowne Norton
- List of car manufacturers of the United Kingdom
