= James Lansdowne Norton =

British motorcycle designer and manufacturer

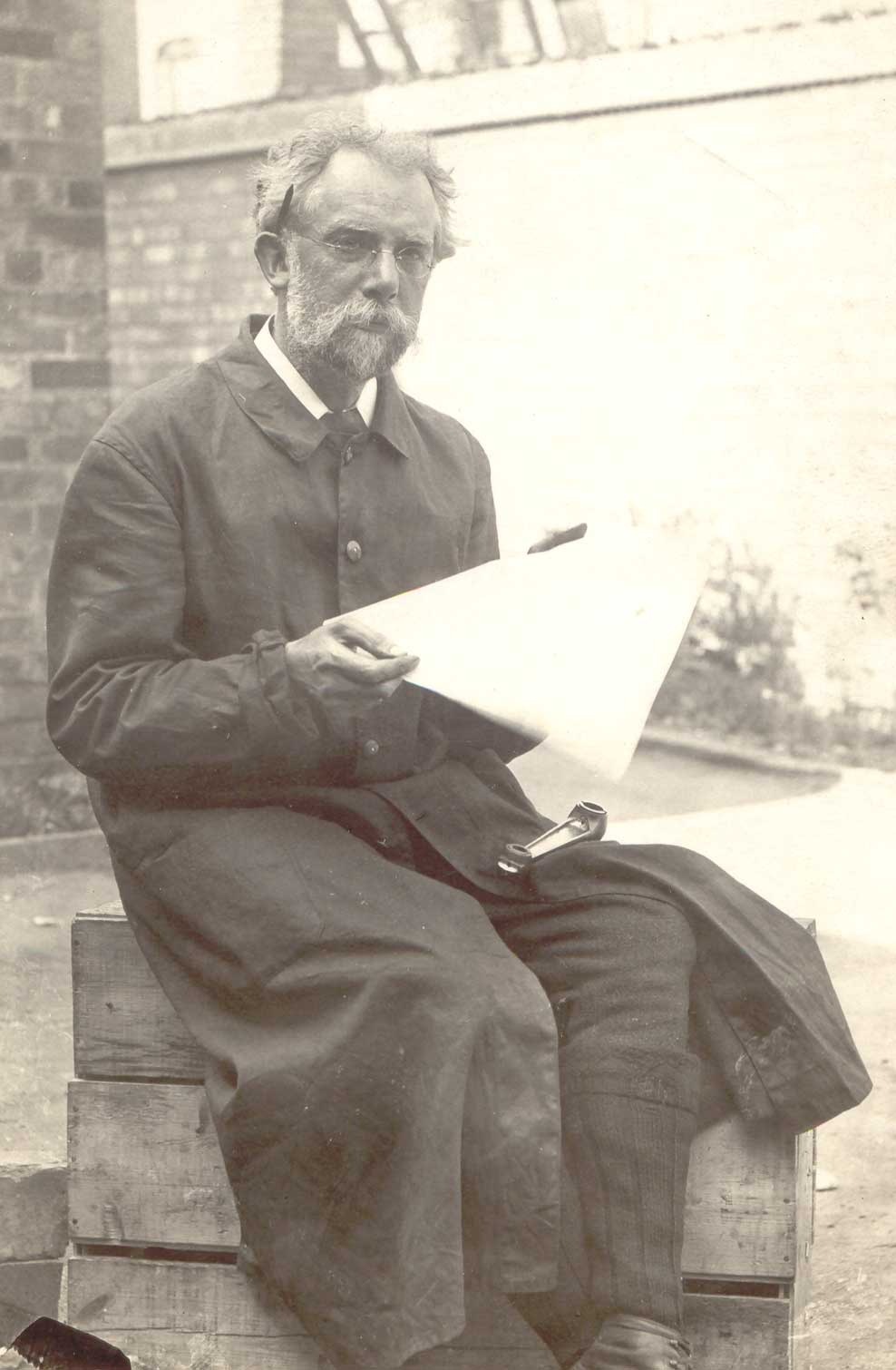
- James Lansdowne Norton
- Born: 1869; Birmingham, England
- Died: 21 April 1925 (aged 55–56); Birmingham, England
- Resting place: Lodge Hill Cemetery
- Occupations: Motorcycle designer Manufacturer
- Years active: 1898–1925
- Known for: Norton motorcycles
- Spouse: Sarah Norton (nee Saxelby 1872 - 1956) ()
- Children: Ethel; Grace; James Lansdowne; Henry Spencer; Raymond

James Lansdowne Norton (1869 – 21 April 1925) was an English motorcycle designer and inventor. He was the founder of Norton Motorcycles, a pioneering British manufacturer.

== Early life ==
James Lansdowne Norton was born in Birmingham in 1869. He showed mechanical ability at an early age and made a model steam engine at the age of ten but began his working life as an apprentice toolmaker in the jewellery trade. His interest was in the development of the bicycle, however, and he soon realised that his career was in engineering.

== Business ==
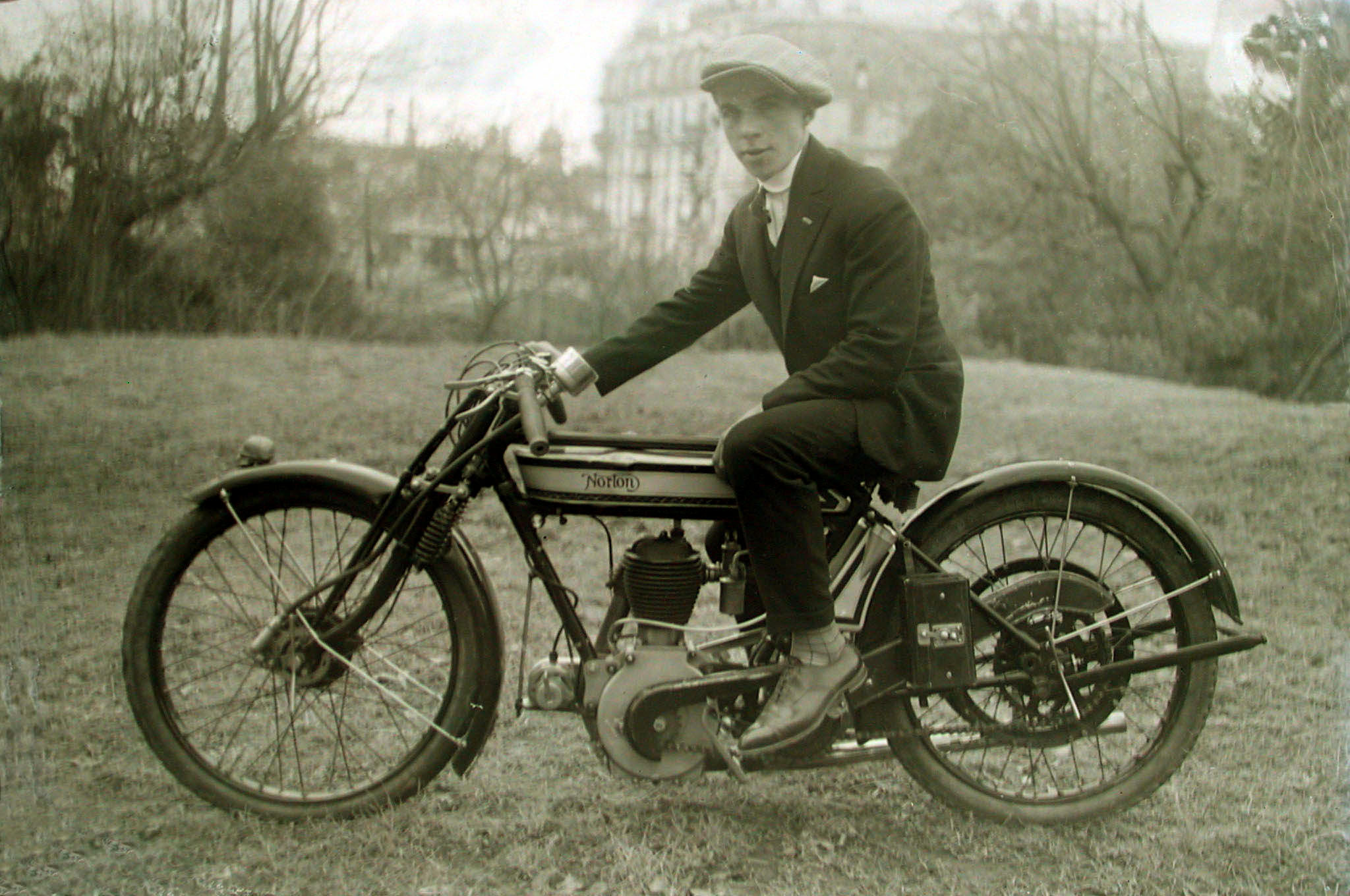
Norton 490cc 1921

James Norton started The Norton Manufacturing Company at the age of 29 in 1898 at premises in Bradford Street, Birmingham. Initially supplying bicycle spare parts he progressed to fully assembled bicycles.

Norton's career was disrupted in 1888 when he was struck by a severe case of rheumatic fever. In an effort to recover, he took a return sea voyage to New York, but his health remained fragile throughout his life. The illness took a lasting toll, aging him prematurely and earning him the affectionate nickname 'Pa'.

Norton met Charles Garrard, who worked for the French Clément engine company and in 1902 Norton made his first powered motorcycle called the "Energette" with a single-cylinder 143cc Clément engine made in Belgium. A fully restored example of the first Norton motorcycle is on display at the National Motorcycle Museum near Birmingham. Norton also used larger capacity Moto Rêve V-twin engines from Switzerland and Peugeot engines from France.

In 1907 Rem Fowler entered a Norton motorcycle in the first Isle of Man TT race and won the twin cylinder class, beginning Norton's racing career. Pa Norton was on the island for this race to look after the machine and act as the pit attendant.

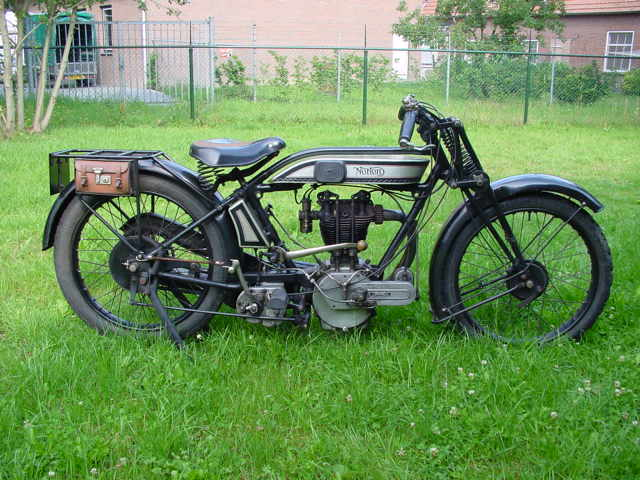
Norton Model 18 1924

In 1909 Norton exhibited motorcycles with his own engine design at the Stanley Show, the Big Four side valve single which remained in production until 1954. He went on to develop a prototype overhead-valve engine in 1922 with which Dan O'Donovan set a new world record for the 500cc kilometre at 89 mph. A road going motorcycle, the Norton Model 18 was launched in 1923 and became a best seller, as well as establishing many records, including Alec Bennet's Senior TT win.

James Norton was a great engineer but struggled with the business and his company went into liquidation in 1913, being bought by Bob Shelley, who owned an automotive accessories manufacturing business.

== African journey ==
At 54 years of age, during the winter of 1921–1922, Norton decided to visit his brother Harry in Durban (South Africa) and then ride his 633cc Big Four with sidecar on 3000-mile trip to all of South Africa's major cities.

It was a particularly severe rain season and Norton had to cross rivers in flood and take many detours because numerous bridges had been swept away. The back wheel of the Big Four needed to be dug out of the mud on many occasions but the motorcycle kept on going. The only damage sustained was to a sidecar connection bolt. Norton refused to give up and take the train back. He arrived back in Cape Town to a hero's reception and well on time to catch the steamer home to England.

This journey was a success and seen as a reliability test trial for the Standard Big Four and De Luxe Side car.

== Final years ==
Norton was diagnosed with terminal cancer of the bowel in 1922 but remained actively involved with the companies racing programme. In 1924 he was forced to watch the Isle of Man TT from a chair but was delighted to see Norton motorcycles winning two of the races. In April 1924 Norton patented a chain-driven overhead-camshaft design he called 'desmodromique'.

James Norton died in 1925 so never saw how his designs would eventually become world leaders. He is buried at Lodge Hill Cemetery in Selly Oak, Birmingham, England.
