= Clément-Bayard =

French automobile and aircraft manufacturer

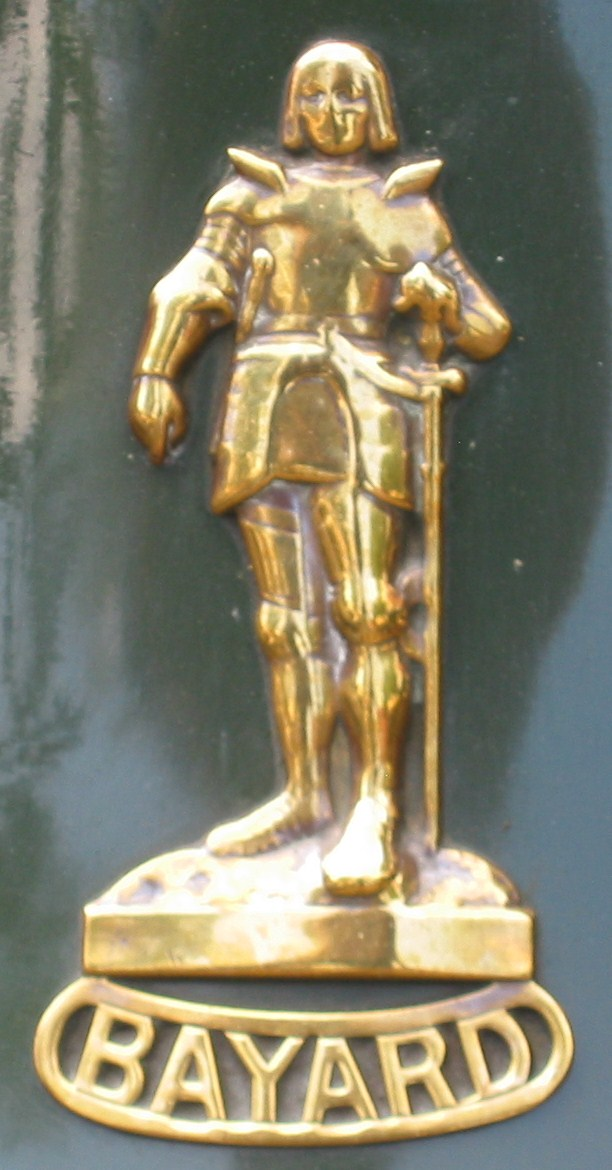
- Founded: 1903
- Founder: Adolphe Clément-Bayard
- Defunct: 1922
- Successor: Citroën
- Headquarters: Levallois-Perret, Paris
- Products: Automobiles, Aeroplanes, Airships
- Owner: Adolphe Clément-Bayard
- Number of employees: circa 4,000 in 1907

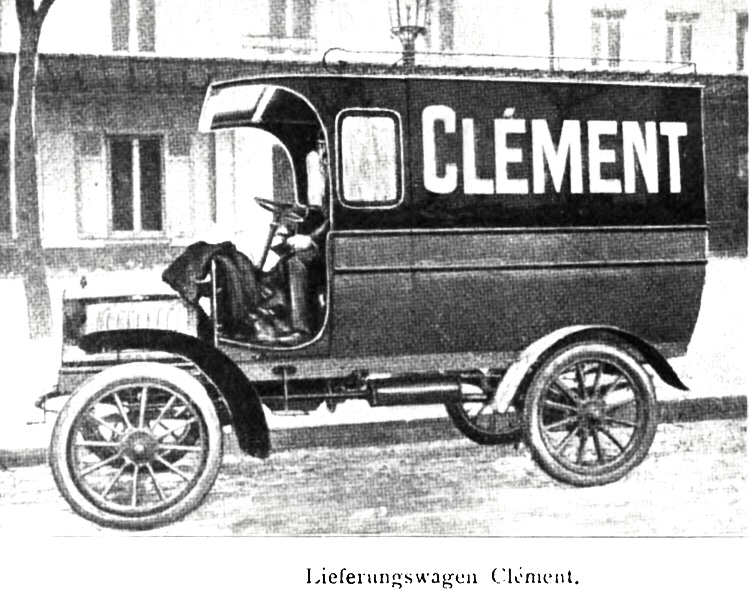
Clément camionnette (1902)

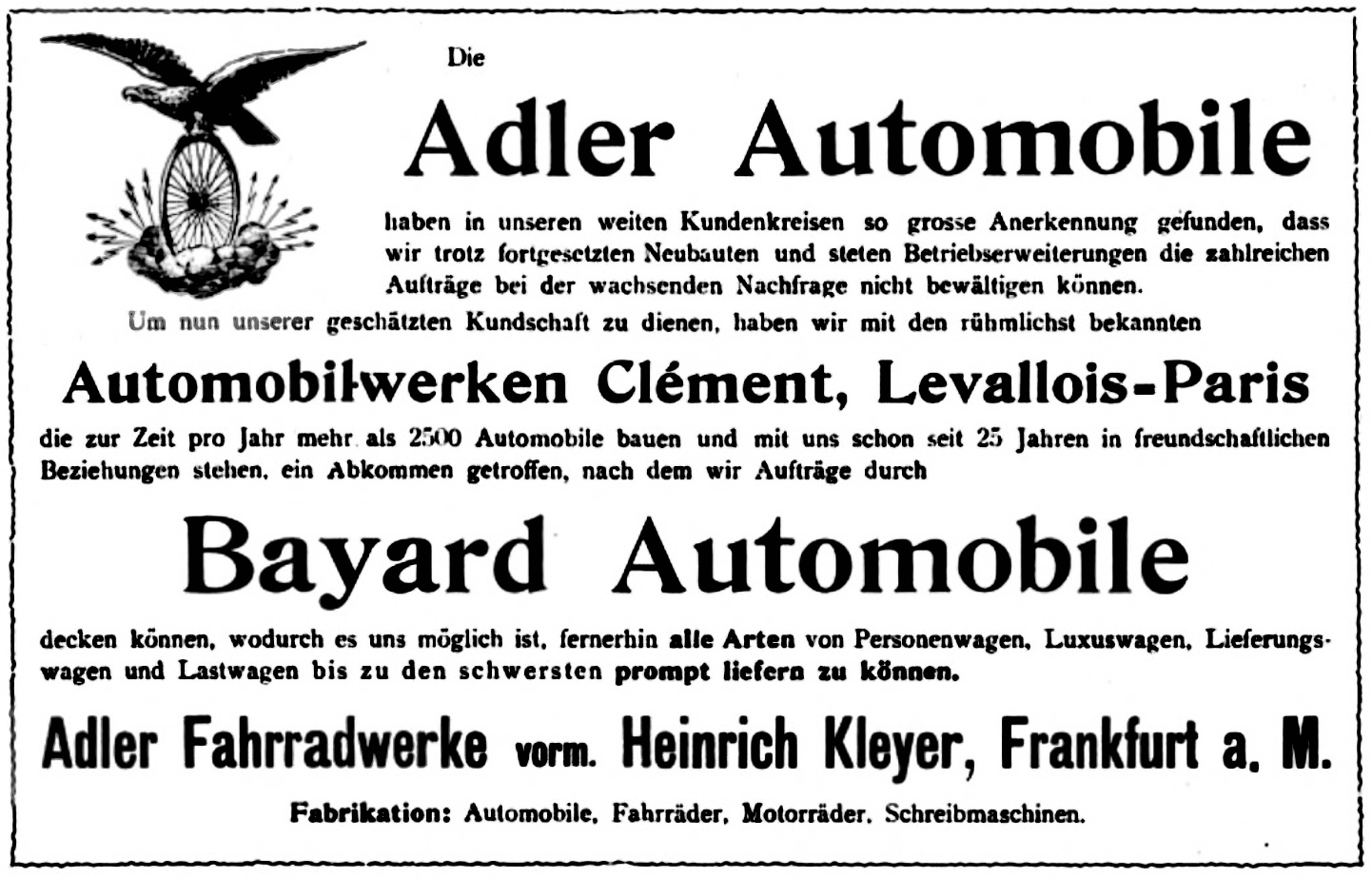
Cooperation between Adler and Clément-Bayard (1905)

Clément-Bayard, also known as Bayard-Clément, was a French manufacturer of automobiles, aeroplanes and airships founded in 1903 by entrepreneur Gustave Adolphe Clément. Clément obtained consent from the Conseil d'Etat to change his name to that of his business in 1909. The extra name celebrated the Chevalier Pierre Terrail, seigneur de Bayard who saved the town of Mézières in 1521. A statue of the Chevalier stood in front of Clément's Mézières factory, and the image was incorporated into the company logo.

From 1903 Clément-Bayard automobiles were built in a modern factory at Mézières, known as La Macérienne, which Clément had designed in 1894 mainly for building bicycles.

The company entered the field of aviation in 1908, announcing the construction of Louis Capazza's 'planeur', a lenticular airship, in L'Aérophile in May 1908.: however it was never built. Adolphe Clément also built Alberto Santos-Dumont's Demoiselle No 19 monoplane that he had designed to compete for the Coupe d'Aviation Ernest Archdeacon prize from the Aéro-Club de France. It was the world's first series production aircraft and by 1909 Clement-Bayard had the license to manufacture Wright engines alongside their own design.

In 1908 'Astra Clément-Bayard' began manufacturing airships at a new factory in La Motte-Breuil.

In 1914 the factory La Macérienne at Mézières was seized by the advancing German army and automobile production in Levallois-Perret, Paris, was suspended as the factory was turned over to war production, military equipment and military vehicles, aero engines, airships and planes.

In 1922 the company was broken up and the factory in Paris was taken over by Citroën.

Circa 1909 Adolphe Clément received permission from the Conseil d'État to change his name to Adolphe Clément-Bayard.

== Motor manufacturing ==
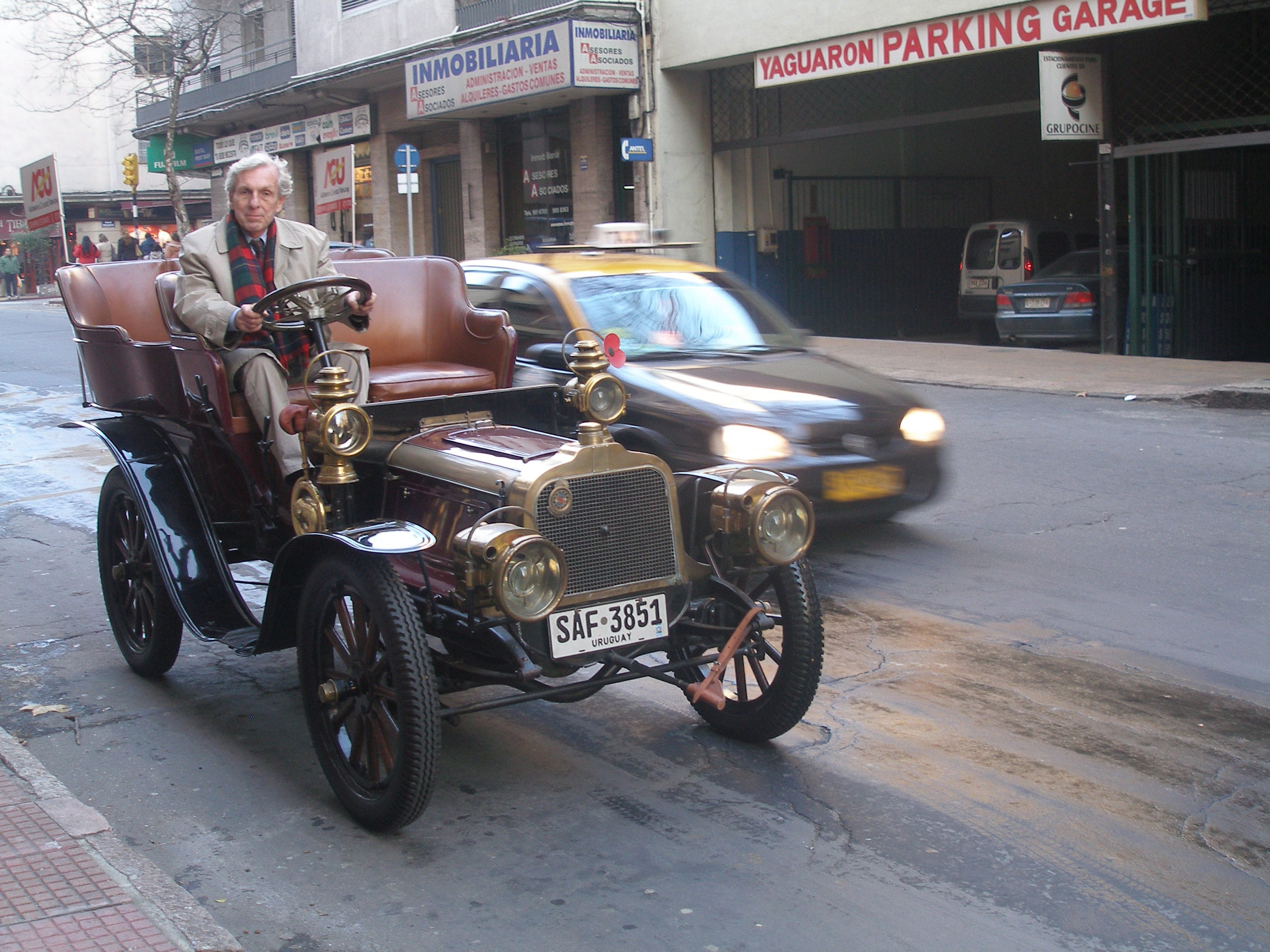
A 1904 Clément-Bayard AC2K (twin-cylinder) in Montevideo, Uruguay

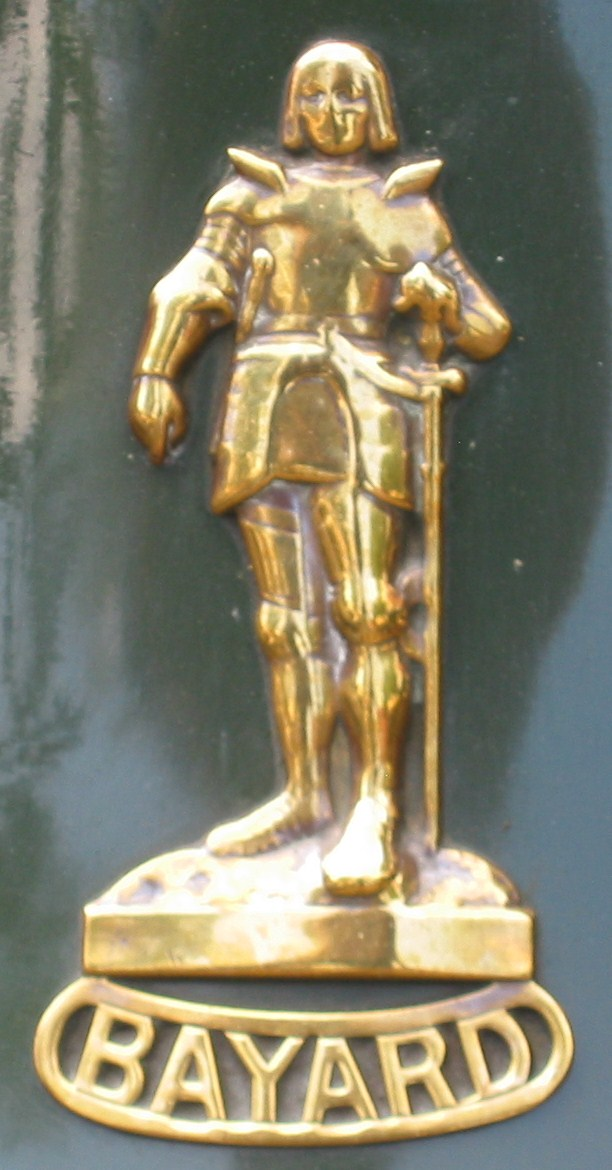
Clément Bayard emblem on the front of a 1907 automobile

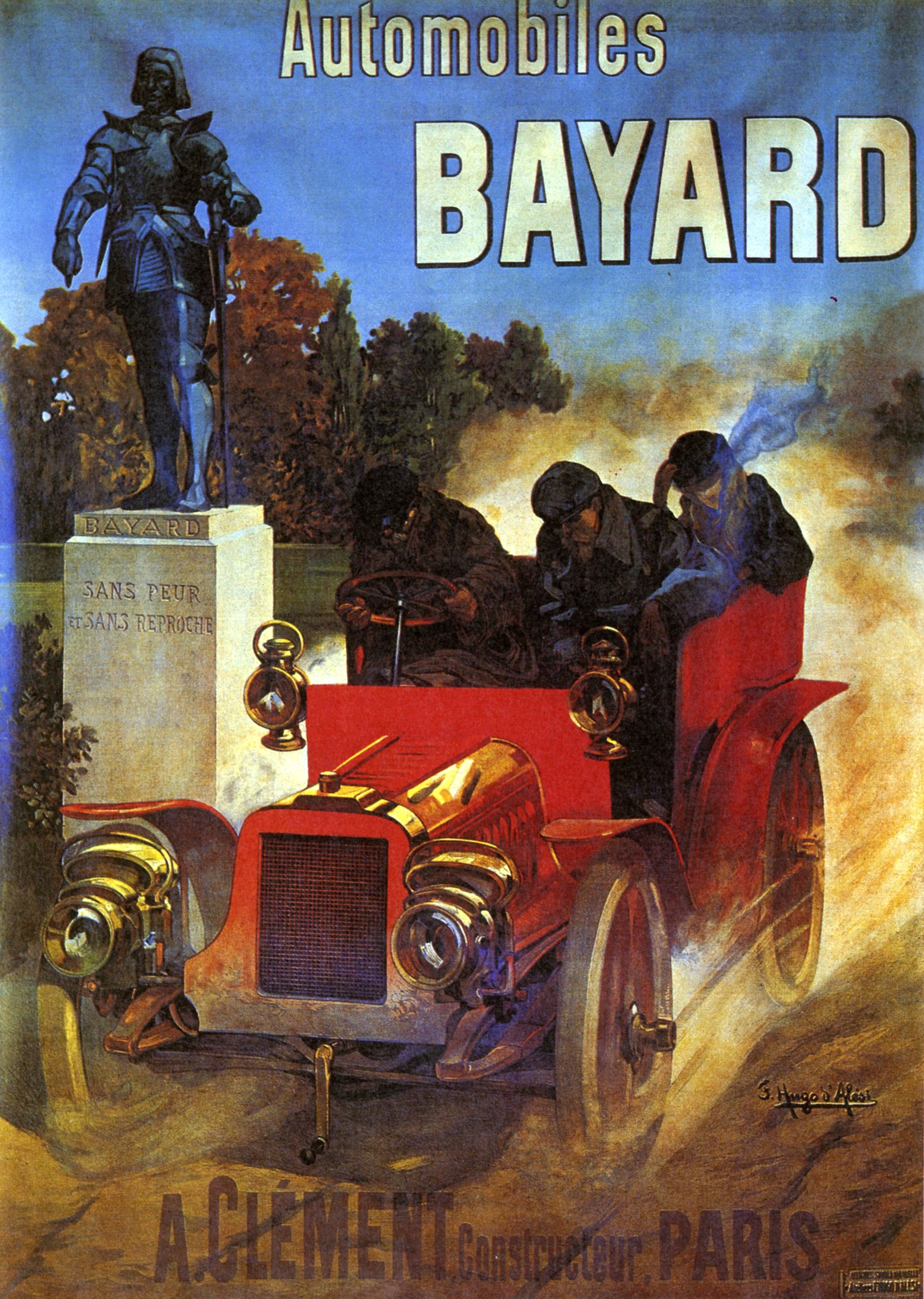
c.1905 publicity image of Clément-Bayard showing the statue of the Chevalier Bayard that stood in front of the factory at Mézières and formed the company logo

In 1896 Adolphe Clément who held the extremely profitable manufacturing rights for Dunlop tyres in France joined with a syndicate led by Dunlop's founder Harvey Du Cros to buy out the Gladiator Cycle Company and they merged it into a major bicycle manufacturing conglomerate of Clément, Gladiator & Humber & Co Limited. The range was expanded, and in 1902 a motorised bicycle led to cars and motorcycles.(See Clément Gladiator cycles for further details)

Clément chose the name Bayard in commemoration of the Chevalier Pierre Terrail, seigneur de Bayard who saved the town of Mézières in 1521. A statue of the Chevalier stood in front of the Mézières factory, and the image was incorporated into the company logo. After the split both marques built very similar cars, but the specifications gradually diverged. Initially, Clément-Bayard cars were imported to Britain under the Talbot brand.

=== Models ===
The initial model range comprised three models (9Hp, 12Hp, 16Hp) and was enhanced in 1904 with a 6Hp single-cylinder, a 7Hp twin-cylinder, and 14Hp, 20Hp & 27Hp 4-cylinders.

From 1904 Clément-Bayard production at Levallois-Perret increased from 1,800 cars per annum to 3,000 in 1907, employing up to 4,000 workers. The range included several models, all luxurious and high quality, from a small two-seater twin-cylinder 8-10 hp to a big four-cylinder 50-60 hp model that could exceed 60 km/h.

In 1907 the 10/12 hp model was introduced with a unitary gearbox and a dashboard radiator.

In 1910 Clément-Bayard started to manufacture a stylish, low cost, small, two-seater roadster, with a 4-cylinder 10/12 hp, and a heater for the driver and passenger. It was very popular and production continued until the outbreak of war in 1914.

By 1913 the factories of Levallois and Mezieres were focused on the production of a wide range of products including car chassis, car bodies, cars, trucks, airships, airplanes, motors, canoes, bicycles, engines and generators.

On the front page of the 15 November 1913 edition of the Revue de l’industrie automobile et aéronautique (Review for Automotive and Aerospace Industry) Clément-Bayard announced a new 4-cylinder 30-40 Hp motor.

By early 1914 Clément-Bayard had a complete range of twelve models, from two to six seats, equipped with engines ranging from a small 7 hp twin-cylinder for less than 7000 francs to a big 6-cylinder 30 Hp unit. Additionally there was a 20 Hp four-cylinder 'valveless' (sleeve-valve) Knight engine which was licensed from Panhard et Levassor.

In 1914 the factory La Macérienne at Mézières was seized by the advancing German army and automobile manufacture in Levallois-Perret, Paris, was suspended as the factory was turned over to war production: military equipment; military vehicles; aero engines; airships; and planes.

After World War I motor production resumed with an 8 hp (6 kW) and a 17.6 hp (13.1 kW) model.

- Clément-Bayard 20 CV
- Clément-Bayard 24 CV
- Clément-Bayard 30 CV
- Clément-Bayard 35/45 CV
- Clément-Bayard 60 CV

=== Models : 1904, 1907, 1909, 1910 ===
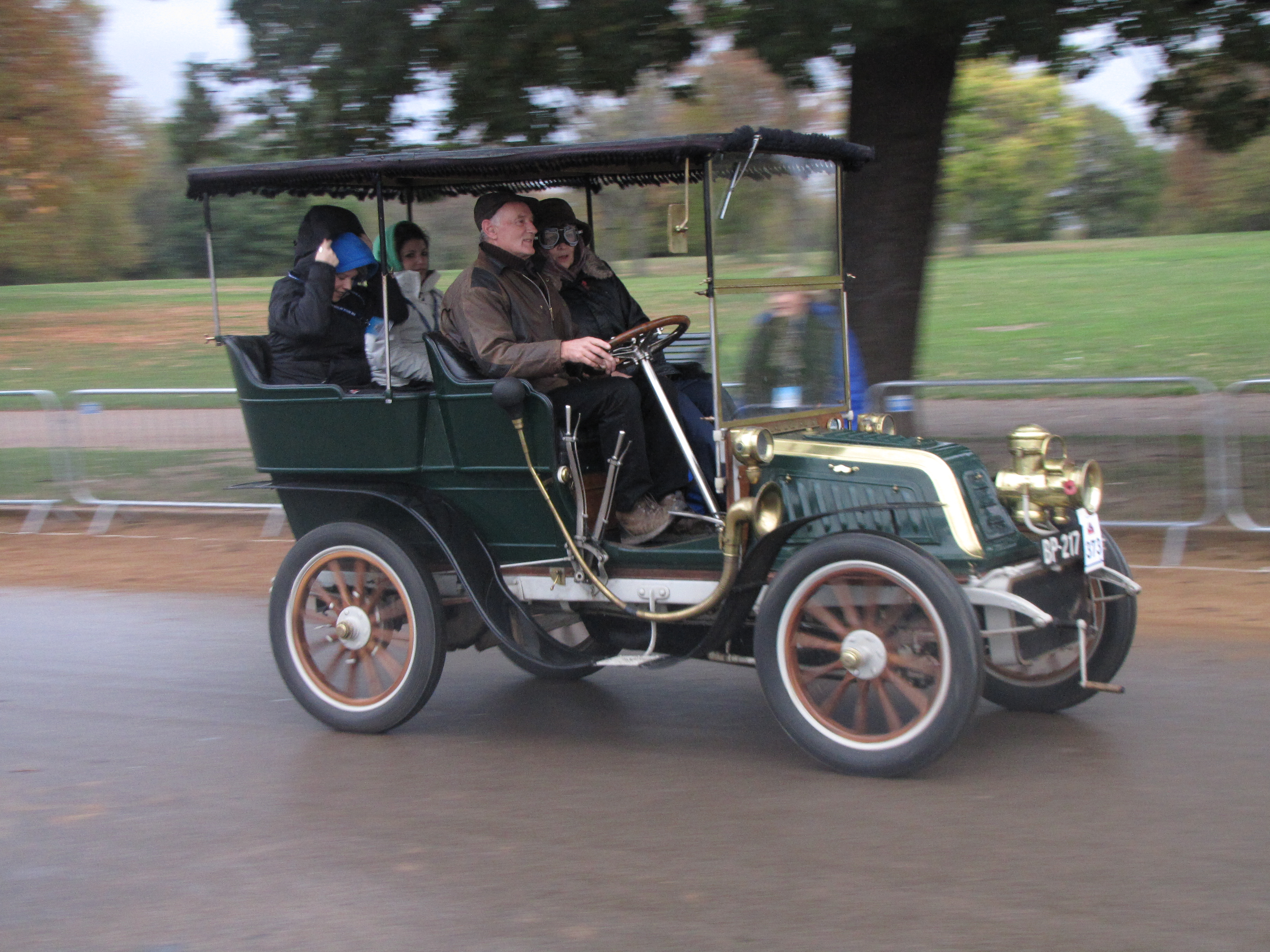
Bayard, 1904

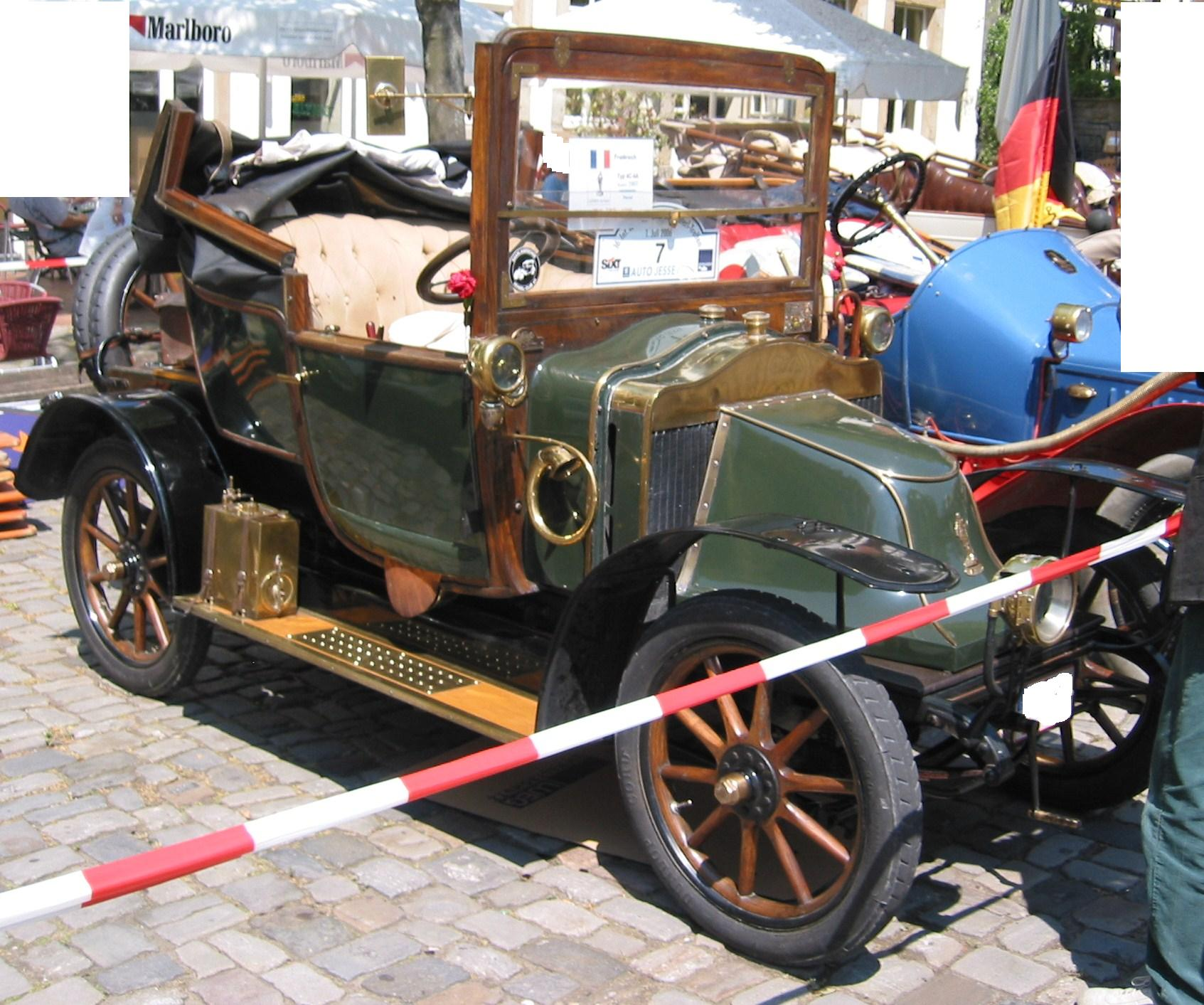
Clément-Bayard (Perret) 4C-4A, 1907

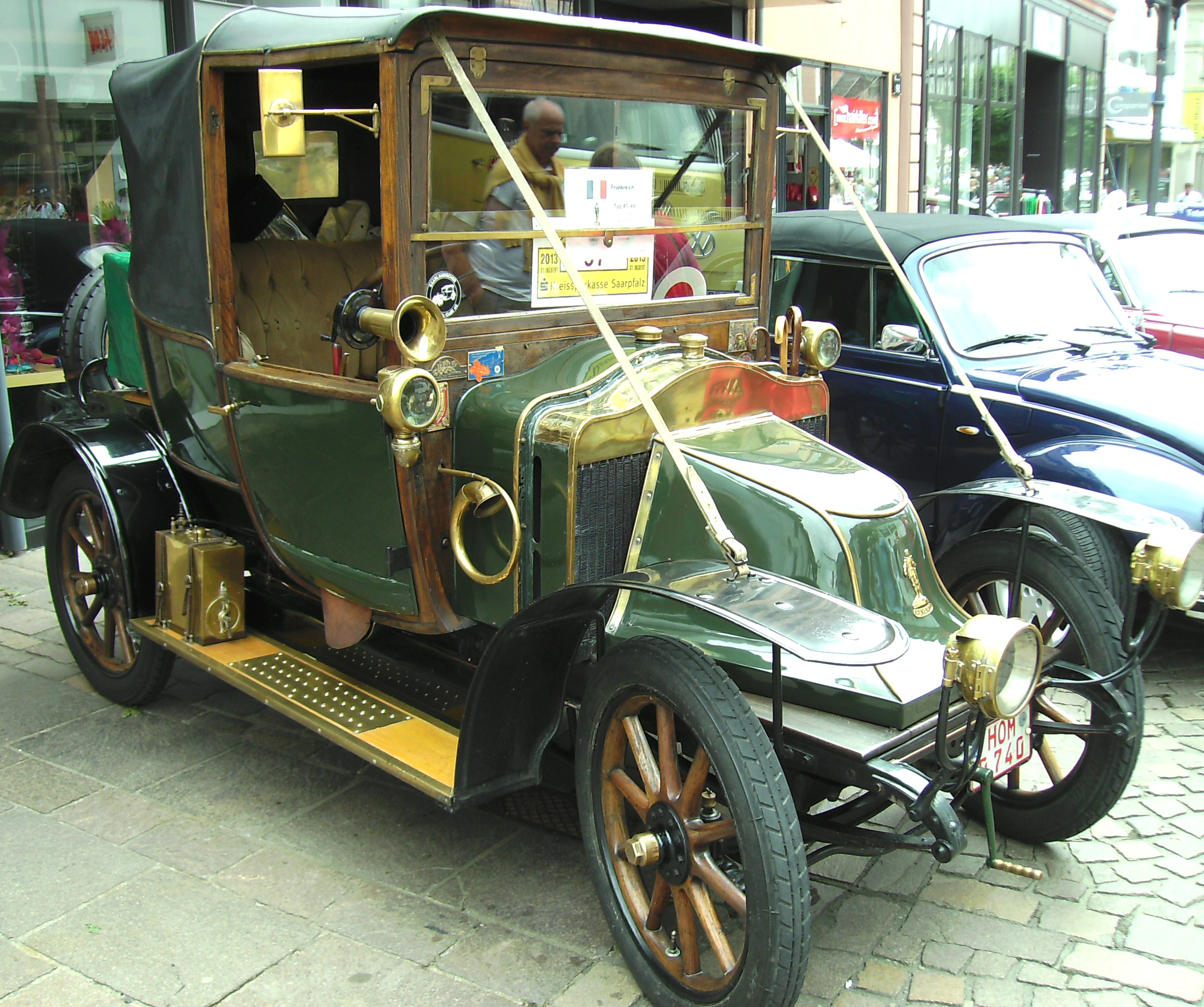
Clément-Bayard (Perret) 4C-4A, 1907

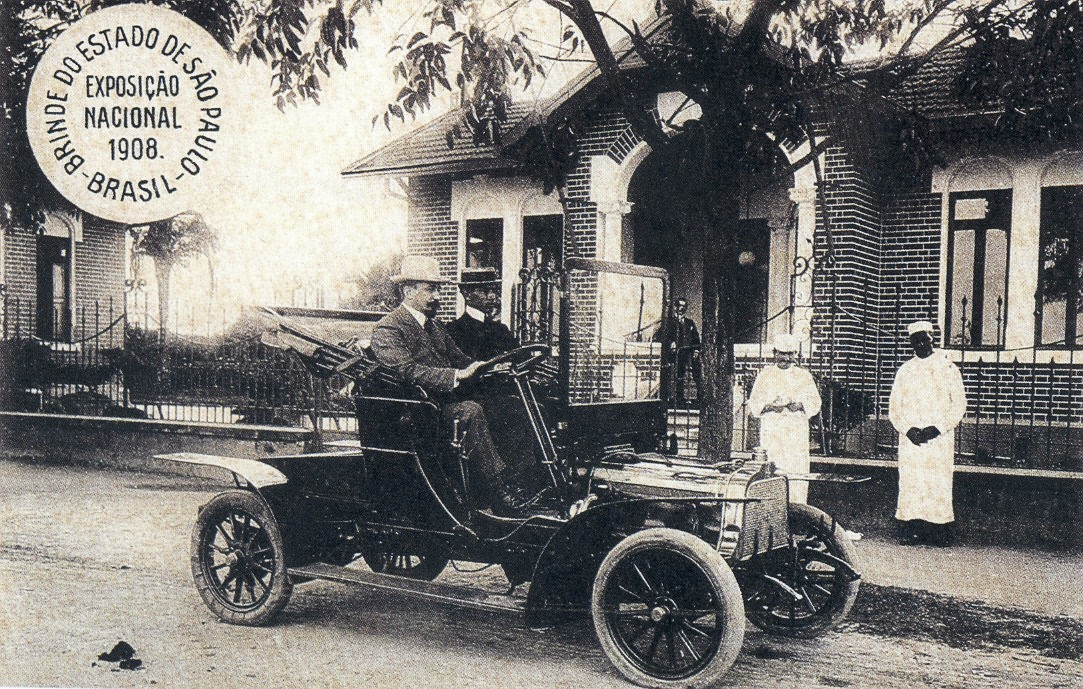
A Clément-Bayard at the 1908 National Exposition, in Rio de Janeiro, Brazil

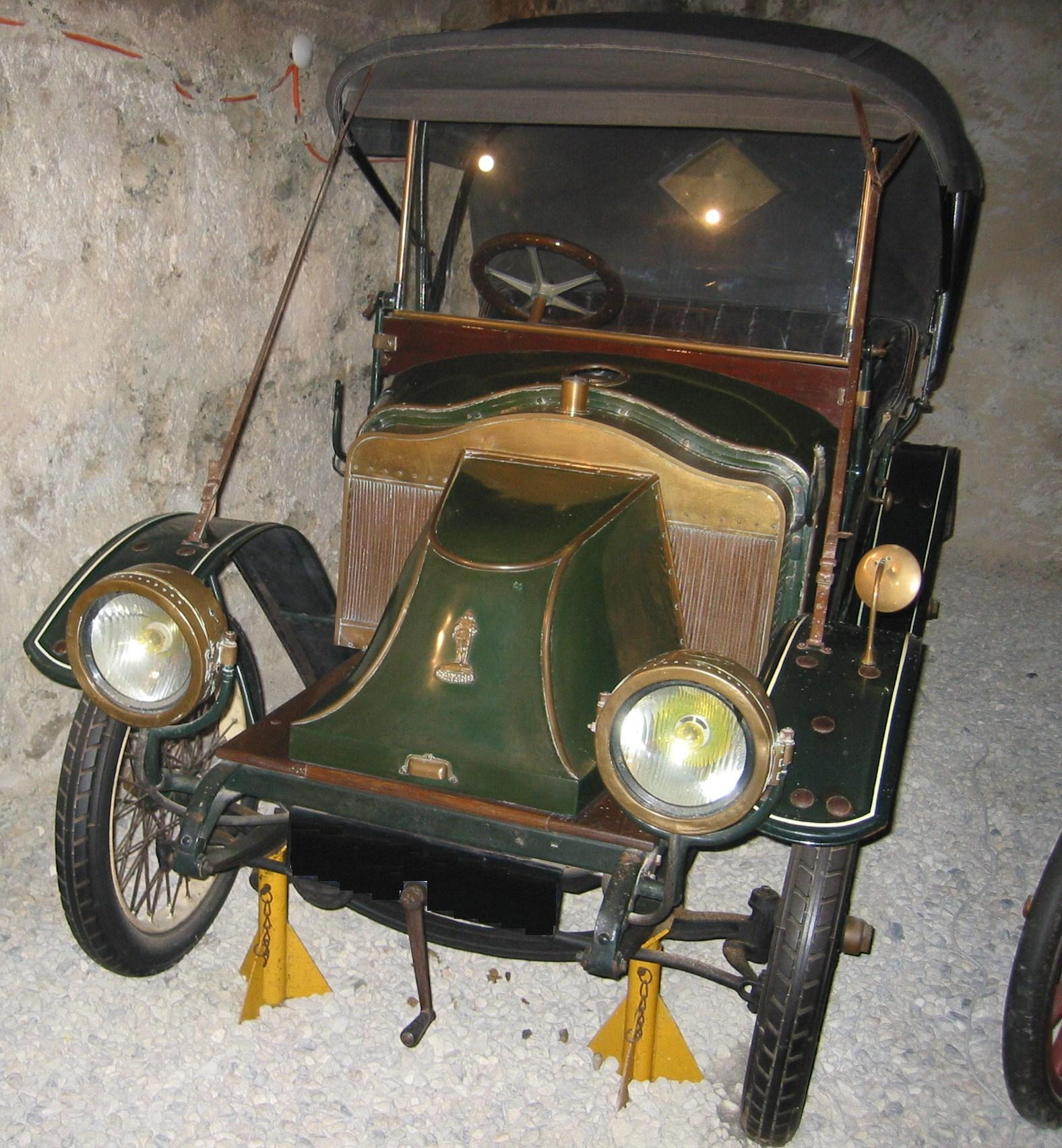
Clément-Bayard, 1909

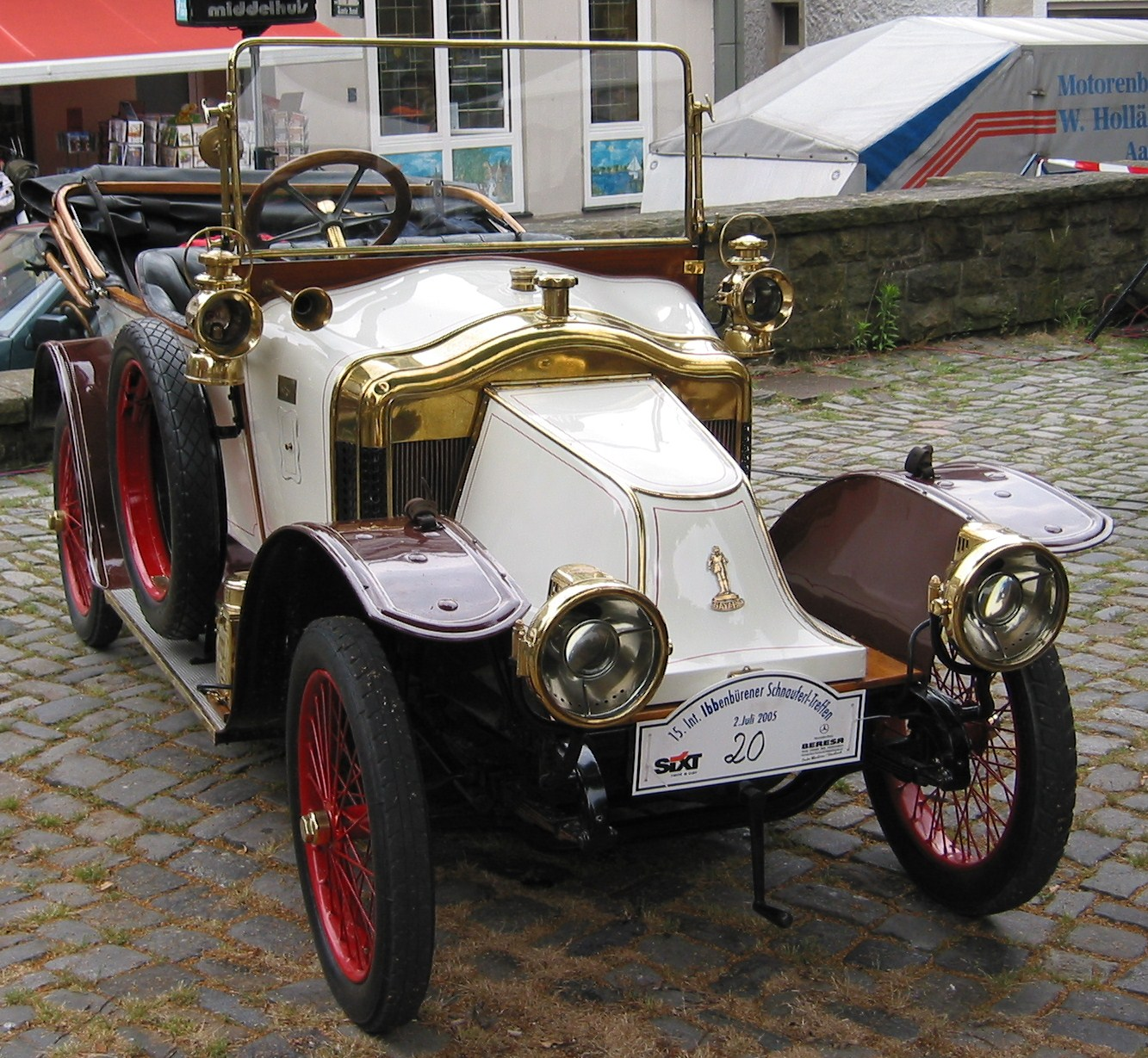
Clément-Bayard, 1910

== Motor racing ==
Albert Clément driving a Clément-Bayard at the French Grand Prix 1906

Clément-Bayard started building automobiles in 1903 and then started building racing cars in 1904. The racing team included Albert Clément, Jacques Guders, Rene Hanriot, Marc-Philippe Villemain, 'Carlès', "De la Touloubre" and A. Villemain, and Pierre Garcets.

=== 1904 season ===
Albert Clément finished 10th at the I Eliminatoires Françaises de la Coupe Internationale, held at the Forest of Argonne on 20 May 1904. This was an eliminating contest for the French entry into the Coupe Internationale (Gordon Bennett Race) where only three cars were allowed per country. Clement finished the 6 lap, 532.79 km event in 7 hours 10 minutes 52.8 seconds. His team-mates Jacques Guders and Rene Hanriot failed to complete a single lap.

Albert Clément won the II Circuit des Ardennes des Voiturettes on 24 July 1904 at Bastogne. He completed the 5 lap 240.010 km race in 4h 26m 52.6seconds at an average speed of 53.91 km/h in an 18Hp Clement -(Bayard?) (car no 5). He also set the fastest lap of the race at 45minutes 02seconds (63.89 km/h).

Clément drove his Clement-Bayard into third place at the III Circuit des Ardennes race at Bastogne, on 25 July 1904. He completed the 5 lap, 591.255 km event in 6 hours 34 minutes 43.2 seconds. His team-mates Jacques Guders and Rene Hanriot both abandoned after four laps.

Clément finished second at the 1904 I.W.K. Vanderbilt Cup Race on Long Island on 8 October 1904. He led lap 8 of the ten lap race and finished the 457.686 km event in 5 hours 28 minutes 13 seconds.

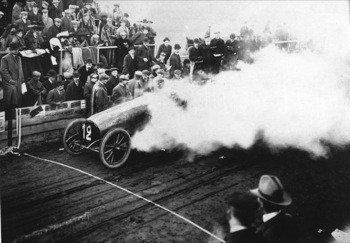
Albert Clement drives an 80 hp Clément-Bayard at the 1905 Vanderbilt Cup

=== 1905 season ===
Albert Clément retired his Clement-Bayard with overheating after 1 lap of the II Eliminatoires Françaises de la Coupe Internationale at the Auvergne on 16 June. This was a qualifier for the Coupe Internationale (Gordon Bennett Race). Clement's team-mate Rene Hanriot finished tenth in 8 hours 23 minutes 39.6s but failed to qualify, whilst Marc-Philippe Villemain retired after three laps.

At the 1905 Vanderbilt cup on Long Island Clément drove an 80 hp Clément-Bayard (France #12) but suffered reliability problems.

Clément retired his Clement-Bayard after the first 166 km lap of the II Coppa Florio at Brescia Italy on 4 September 1905. His team-mate 'Carlès' retired after 2 laps.

=== 1906 season ===
Clément-Bayard entered 3 cars for the inaugural 1906 French Grand Prix at Le Mans where Clément finished third in his 100Hp machine. He completed the 1,238 km event in 12 hours 49 minutes 46.2seconds. Clément led the race at the end of laps 2 and 5 on the second day. Punctures were common and tyre manufacturer Michelin introduced a detachable rim with a tyre already affixed, which could be swapped in about 4 minutes, saving 11 minutes over manually replacing the tyre. These wheels were used by Felice Nazzaro on his FIAT enabling him to wrest second place from Clément on the second day. His father Adolphe was the owner of Dunlop France. Clement's team-mates "De la Touloubre" and A. Villemain retired their 100Hp models after 3 and 5 laps respectively.

Clément finished 6th in the V Circuit des Ardennes on 13 August 1906 at Bastogne. He completed the 7-lap 961 km race in 6 hours 2 minutes 55.2 seconds in a 100Hp Clement-Bayard. His team-mates A. Villemain and Pierre Garcet finished 11th and 12th.

At the 1906 Vanderbilt cup Clément finished 4th driving a 100 hp (75 kW) Clément-Bayard (France #15) and completing the ten laps averaging 59.0 mph (95.0 km/h).

=== 1907 season ===
Albert Clément died while practising for the 1907 French Grand Prix on 17 May. Of the 3 other Clément-Bayard entries, Pierre Garcet and Elliott Shepard, finished 7th and eighth respectively. Clément's car was entered by 'Alezy' who retired after 4 laps.

=== 1908 season ===
The company entered 3 cars for the 1908 French Grand Prix which had 13,963 cc (155 x 185 mm) 4-cylinder overhead camshaft, and Victor Rigal finished 4th. Fernand Gabriel came 12th and Lucien Hautvast with riding mechanic Jean Chassagne retired.

=== Other events ===
In 1905 Clément-Bayard won the Coupe de Calais and 'finished well' at the Course de Dourdan. In both 1907 and 1908 Clément Bayard won the Coupe de l’Automobile-Club de Cannes, and in 1908 it also won the Tour de France Automobile.

== Aeroplane manufacture ==
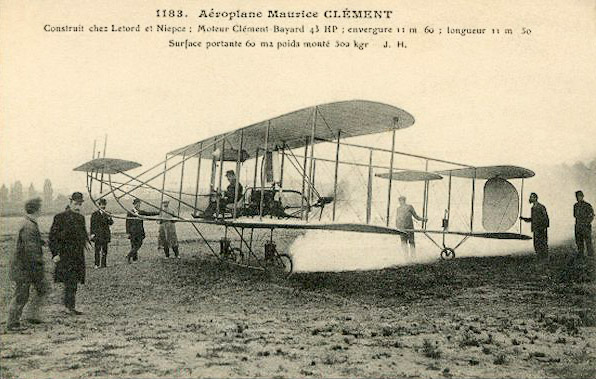
Maurice Clement at the controls of the 1908 Clement Bayard biplane.

Clément-Bayard was an early French manufacturer of aircraft engines and lighter-than-air vehicles, with the earliest flights occurring in 1908. Clément-Bayard manufactured the world's first series production aircraft.

The company worked with Louis Capazza to produce the 'planeur (glider) Bayard-Clément' which was unveiled in L'Aérophile on 15 May 1908.

The company also started working with Alberto Santos-Dumont in 1908 to build his Demoiselle No 19 monoplane that he had designed to compete for the Coupe d'Aviation Ernest Archdeacon prize from the Aéro-Club de France. The plane was small and stable, but they planned a production run of 100 units, built 50 and sold only 15 for 7,500 francs for each airframe. It was the world's first series production aircraft. By 1909 it was offered with a choice of 3 engines, Clement 20 hp; Wright 4-cyl 30 hp (Clement-Bayard had the license to manufacture Wright engines); and Clement-Bayard 40 hp designed by Pierre Clerget. It achieved 120 km/h.

Pierre Clerget designed a range of Clement-Bayard aircraft engines including a 7-cylinder supercharged radial, the 4-cyl 40 hp used on the Demoiselle, a 4-cyl 100 hp used on 'Hanriot Etrich' monoplanes, and a V8 200 hp airship engine.

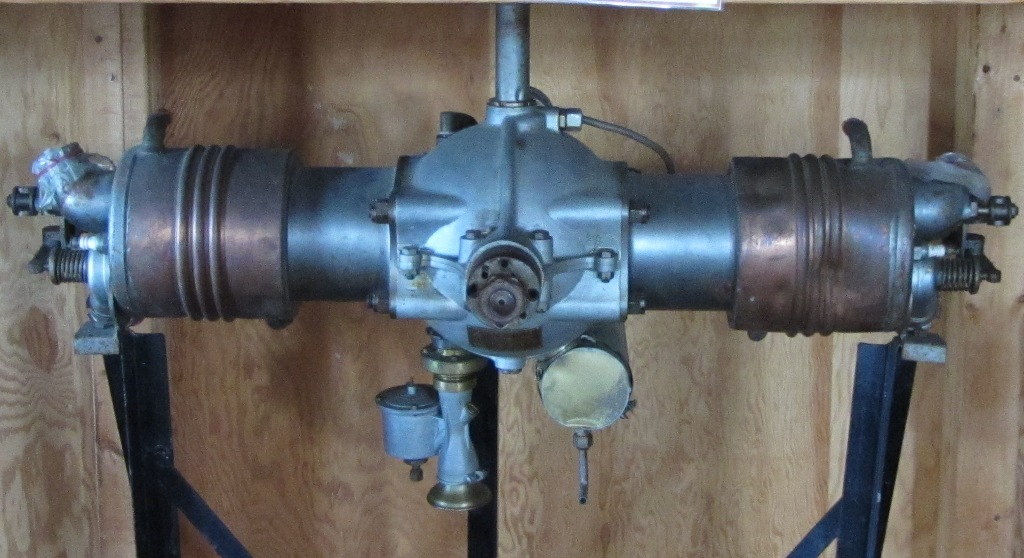
A two-cylinder Clement-Bayard engine on display

In 1910 the Clement-Bayard Monoplane No. 1 was introduced at the Paris show. Jean Chassagne who was working on the development and testing, participating successfully in variety of early aviation challenges winning endurance, altitude and speed prizes.

By 1912 Clément-Bayard built a biplane plus three different models of horizontally opposed aircraft engines.

In November 1912 the Clement-Bayard Monoplane No. 5 was introduced. It was powered by a Gnome 7-cylinder rotary engine producing 70 hp (52 kW). The pilot sat in an aluminium-and-leather tub.

In 1913 a three-seater biplane was introduced as part of the military project, the Clement-Bayard No. 6. It was configured for two observers in front of the pilot, and was powered by either a 4-cyl 100 hp (75 kW) Clement-Bayard or 4-cylinder Gnome engine.

In 1914 Clément-Bayard produced a steel scouting monoplane powered by either an 80 hp (60 kW) motor or a 100 hp (75 kW) Gnome et Rhône engine. The nickel steel armour was designed for protection against rifle fire.

== Airship manufacture ==
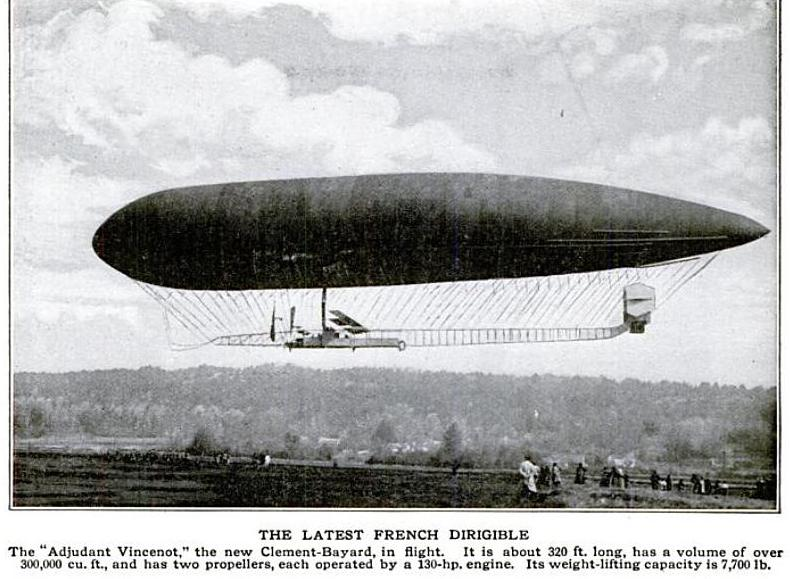
Clement-Bayard Airship No 1, The "Adjudant Vincenot" circa 1910. Caption from Popular Mechanics magazine 1910

In 1908 'Astra Clément-Bayard' began manufacturing airships at a new factory in La Motte-Breuil in response to a French Army decision to commence airship operations.

The Clément-Bayard No.1 airship was offered to the French government but was too expensive so it was bought by Tsar Nicholas II for the Russian army.

In 1910 the Clément-Bayard No.2, piloted by Maurice Clément, was the first airship to cross the Channel, travelling over 380 km in 6 hours. The army ordered 3 copies.

The airship hangar in La Motte-Breuil is still maintained by Clément-Talbot Ltd.

=== Clément-Bayard dirigibles ===
Seven Clément-Bayard airships were completed.

- N° 1 was 56.25 metres long, 10.58 metres wide, 3,500 m^{3}, powered by 2 Clément Bayard 115 cv engines. First flew on 28 October 1908.
- N° 2 was 76.50 metres long, 13.22 metres wide, 7,000 m^{3}, powered by 2 Clément Bayard 120 cv engines. Top speed 54 km/h. First flew on 1 June 1910.
- N° 3 Dupuy de Lôme, 89 metres long, 13.5 metres wide, 9,000 m^{3}, powered by 2 Clément Bayard 120 cv engines. First flew on 1 May 1912.
- N° 4 Adjudant Vincenot, 88.5 metres long, 13.5 metres wide, 9,800 m^{3}, powered by 2 Clément Bayard 120 cv engines. Top speed 49 km/h. First flew in 1911.
- Adj Vincenot modified, 87.3 metres long, 13.5 metres wide, 9,800 m^{3}, powered by 2 Clément Bayard 120 cv engines. Top speed 53 km/h. First flew on 13 August 1913.
- N° 5 livré à la Russie, 86 metres long, 13.5 metres wide, 9,600 m^{3}, powered by 2 Clément Bayard 130 cv engines. First flew on 9 February 1913.
- Montgolfier, 73.5 metres long, 12.2 metres wide, 6,500 m^{3}, powered by 2 Clément Bayard 90 cv engines. Top speed 60 km/h. First flew on 31 July 1913.

== Factories used by Clément-Bayard ==
- In 1894 he started construction work on a former military site in the Faubourg Saint-Julien at Mézières, to build a new factory, which would become known as La Macérienne. Clément personally supervised the work remotely using photographs taken every day and visiting the site once a week. By 1897 it was producing components and spokes for the Gladiator Cycle Company. It covered 15,000 m2 and using a hydraulic turbine power plant, a steam room, large machine hall, a foundry, a workshop for the nickel processing, the operation with the manufacturing of nuts and spokes on a bike. The factory building still exists but in the spring of 2006 it was transformed into a cultural center.
- Clement-Bayard Automobiles was situated at the Boulevard de la Saussaye 57 in Neuilly in west Paris. Between 1899 and 1922, three wheelers and cars were built there.
- Shortly after the purchase of Gladiator cycles in 1896 Adolfe Clément began to build the new factory at Levallois-Perret in north west Paris. This produced cycles and various cars from 1898, (Clément-Panhard, Clément-Gladiator from 1901, Clément-Bayard from 1903), and went on to build various Citroën models including the Citroën 2CV for nearly forty years from 1948 to 1988. From August 1914 it was dedicated to wartime production.
- In 1908 'Astra Clément-Bayard' began manufacturing airships at a new factory in La Motte-Breuil.

== War activity ==
Adolphe Clément ceded control of Clément-Bayard to his son Maurice in early 1914, but the consequences of World War I for the company were disastrous. The La Macérienne factory at Mézières was lost to the Germans, the machinery was shipped back to Germany, and the forges, foundries and smelter were destroyed. The gutted building was used as an indoor riding school for German officers.

Automobile production at Levallois-Perret in Paris was suspended in August 1914 and the factory was turned over to war production, military equipment and military vehicles, aero engines, airships and planes.

== Demise ==
In 1922 the Clément-Bayard automobile company was sold to André Citroën, in whom Adolphe Clément also invested financially, and the factory at Levallois-Perret became the centre of 2CV manufacturing for the next 40 years.
