= Fred Cooper (bicyclist) =

Frederick Cooper (13 March 1852 – 21 July 1935) was an English professional racing cyclist and subsequently partner in a bicycle manufacturing business.

Cooper was born in 1852 in London. The family had moved to Birmingham by 1861 and subsequently, at some date between 1866 and 1870, they made a further move to Sheffield where his father was the landlord of the White Bear, a public house in the centre of the town.

== Professional racing career ==
Bicycle racing as a spectator sport is generally regarded as having started in France in 1868. It was introduced into England in 1869. Cooper was among the first professional cyclists who made a living from travelling from place to place to compete for what were then substantial sums of money. Typically a prize of £50 might be offered (in terms of labour value, the equivalent of about £28,000 in 2017 values) but in a major championship race this amount could often be doubled.

It is not known what led Cooper to take up professional cycling but his first recorded appearance in this capacity was in a velocipede race at Chesterfield in June 1870. From that date on he made frequent appearances on the racing circuit until his retirement from professional cycling in 1879. He was essentially a sprinter rather than a long-distance rider. His favoured distance was one mile and he made frequent bids for the title of all-England one-mile champion. His first attempt was in November 1870 at the Molineux Stadium in Wolverhampton where he won his initial heat but appears to have been defeated in the final. However, between 1872 and 1879 he secured the title on at least six occasions. His great rival for this accolade was John Keen: the title alternated between the two over a number of years and they are said to have competed against each other for the title on 17 or 18 occasions with Cooper winning eight times and Keen nine. But whilst Keen and Cooper were professional rivals, they seem to have been on friendly terms: in later life they lived in the same village in Surrey, Long Ditton, Cooper took part in a benefit race for Keen in 1885 and was actively involved in 1900 as member of a committee formed to raise funds to support Keen who was said to have fallen on hard times.

Cooper held the one-mile world record between 1879 and 1882. In May 1879, in a professional versus amateurs race arranged by Cambridge University Bicycle Club, he completed the first mile of a two-mile race in 2 minutes 47.4 seconds. The following year, again at Cambridge, he reduced this time to 2 minutes 46.6 seconds, this time in a one-mile race. To mark this achievement he was presented with a commemorative medal by the CUBiC. His record lasted only until 1882 when it was beaten by H.L. Cortis, an amateur from Surbiton, with a time of 2 minutes 41.6 seconds.

In the 1860s the normal type of machine was the velocipede and it was this that Cooper and other cyclists used in the early days of competitive racing; but following its introduction in the early 1870s, the high-wheeler (‘penny-farthing’ or ‘ordinary’) with its large-diameter front wheel and hence greater speed, became the normal machine for racing. Cooper's preferred version was that made by Thomas Humber which first appeared in 1871. He is recorded as having used machines with wheel diameters such as 52, 54 or 55 inches. Since an ‘ordinary’ might have had a wheel with a diameter as great as 60 inches, these comparatively small wheel sizes suggest that Cooper's physique was fairly slight.

To all intents and purposes Cooper ended his career as a professional racing cyclist in 1879. Keen defeated him for the one-mile championship in September 1879 and Cooper does not appear to have made any attempt to recover the title. In the census returns of 1881, by which time he was living in London, he described himself as a ‘bicycle manufacturer’. After 1879, apart from the races at Cambridge in 1880, there is only one record of his appearance on the professional circuit until June 1881 when the much younger Richard Howell of Wolverhampton (1863–1903) defeated both Keen and Cooper in separate races at the Molineux Stadium and claimed the one-mile championship. In a further race at Leicester in October 1881 Howell again beat Cooper (although only narrowly). This seems to have been Cooper's final professional race, although during the 1880s he continued to take part in non-competitive events such as exhibition races or benefit races.

== Commercial activities ==
Cooper normally rode Humber bicycles during his racing career and in 1877 he joined Thomas Humber and Thomas Marriott in the firm of Humber, Marriott & Cooper which was based at Beeston, Nottinghamshire. He took on management of the company's depot at 98 Richmond Road, West Brompton, London. This partnership was dissolved in 1885 when Marriott and Cooper left to set up their own company as bicycle wholesalers. They retained the right to use the name ‘Humber’ for the products they sold and to use any of the patents that had been granted to the original company. This is reflected in the 1891 census returns when Cooper was described as a ‘cycle importer’. In 1899 the firm of Marriott & Cooper was purchased by financial interests who combined it with Thomas Humber's company and floated it as a public company. Following this move Cooper retired at a surprisingly early age (47) from any active occupation and was described in the 1901 census as a ‘retired bicycle manufacturer’.

== The hydrocycle ==
During the 1890s Cooper showed a particular interest in the aquacycle or hydrocycle, a kind of scull powered by a bicycle mechanism rather than by oars. The concept had been known for at least 20 years but little interest had been shown in it. Cooper's interest probably dated from when, some time between 1881 and 1891, he moved to a house close to the river Thames in Long Ditton in Surrey. It may also be connected with the fact that his old rival John Keen had patented a similar machine in about 1885. The earliest reference that has been found to Cooper's machine is dated 1890. It required three cyclists to power it and it could attain a speed of 8 m.p.h., although it was said to be hard work even at 6 or 7 m.p.h. In May 1893 Cooper and his team completed the 101 miles from Oxford to Putney in 19 hours 27 minutes. He continued to use his hydrocycle on a regular basis throughout the 1890s and probably later, although his interest was probably simply as a personal hobby or diversion: he seems to have made no attempt to market the hydrocycle on a commercial basis.

== Personal life ==
Cooper married his first wife, Ellen Clarke at St John's church, Park in Sheffield on 6 November 1874. She died in childbirth or very shortly afterwards after only three months of marriage on 9 February 1875. Cooper then left Sheffield to live in London and his surviving daughter was brought up by her maternal grandparents.

By 1891 Cooper had moved to Long Ditton where he lived at 8 Cholmley Villas, close to the south bank of the river Thames. Perhaps no more than a coincidence, his old rival, John Keen, also lived in Long Ditton. He remained a widower but his household included a housekeeper and her three daughters. In 1900 Cooper married the oldest of these daughters (Ellen Amelia Turner) who was 16 years his junior. Probably at about the same time he moved to a house in Albany Park Road, Ham near Kingston upon Thames and again close to the banks of the Thames. He had no further children and remained at that address until his death on 21 July 1935 which took place at Hove. His estate was sworn at £8,358; the principal beneficiary was his one daughter.
