= John Keen (cyclist) =

John Thompson Keen was born on 25 February 1849 at Broadway in the county of Worcestershire, England, and lived in Surbiton, Surrey from the age of five. He gained an international reputation both as a professional sports cyclist and a manufacturer of bicycles.

Portrait of John Keen with cycle, taken at Kingston Museum 2009

Also known as ‘Happy Jack’, John Keen trained as a carpenter but his passion was the new sport of cycling on high bicycles (penny-farthing) which were newly developed from the velocipede. It has been reported that he began racing as early as 1869 and when a racing track opened in Surbiton he won the first event.

He raced over a number of distances. In 1872 he was recorded as having ridden ten miles in less than 36 minutes and in 1874 he rode 50 miles in 3 hours and nine minutes. In May 1873 Keen, with James Moore introduced larger wheeled bicycles to France at the championships in Lyon where wheel sizes up to 45 inches had been the norm.

Keen frequently competed against Fred Cooper for the One Mile Professional Championship. An athletic newspaper at the time reported that 12,000 people attended a meeting at Wolverhampton to see the men compete.

In the spring of 1876 John Keen travelled to New York with his bicycle. By 1878 he was internationally reputed to be the fastest rider in the world, the professional champion of England and his name appeared on advertisements (in 1879) for the Columbia bicycle manufactured in the USA which stated his achievement of 1 mile in 2 minutes and 43 seconds (22 mph).

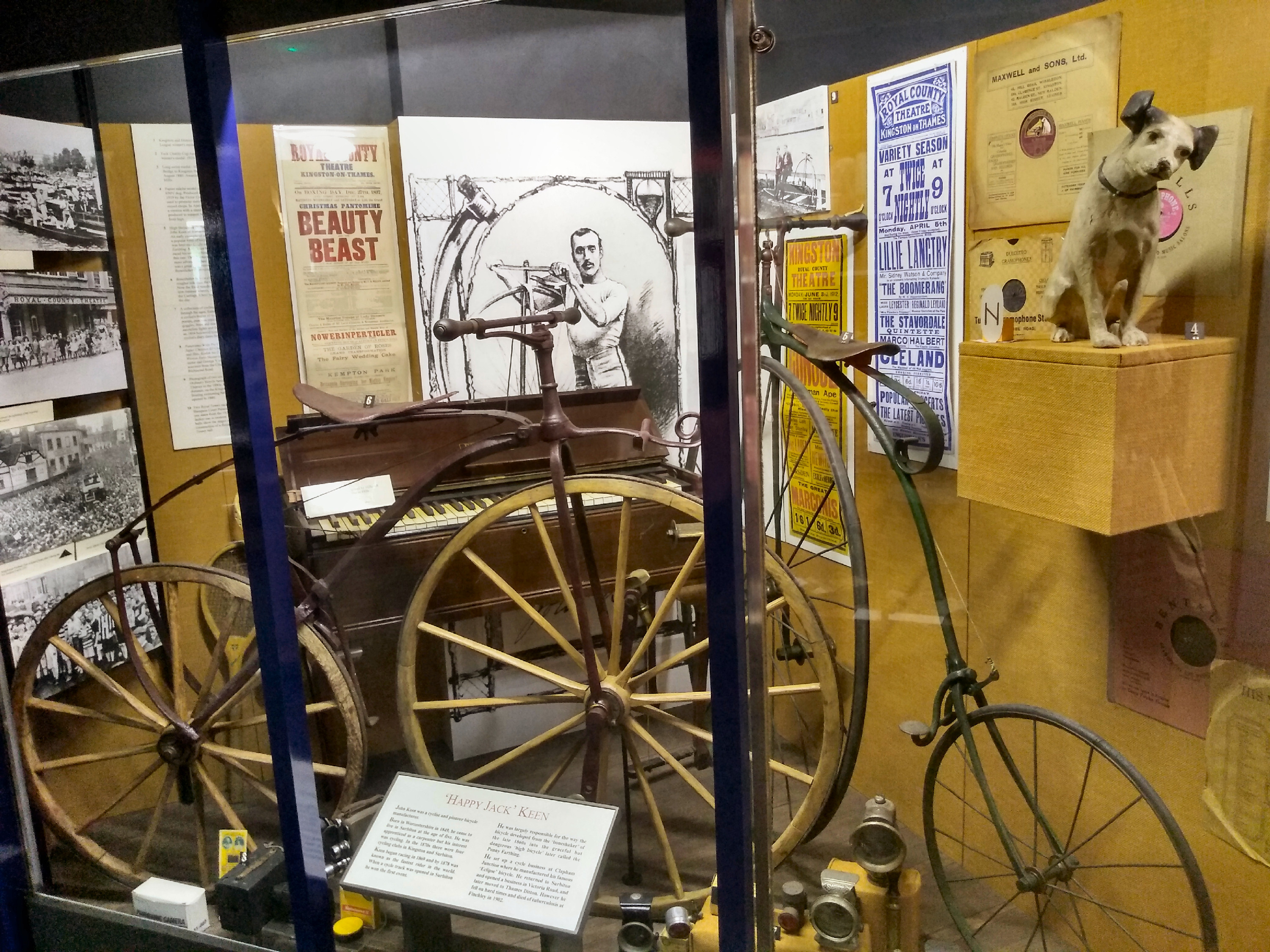
The Happy Jack Keen display at Kingston Museum

In 1879 Keen, together with David Stanton and William Cann were invited to race in the United States against inexperienced local opposition. In pursuit of all records from one to twenty miles, Keen achieved 16 miles and 790 yards in one hour. It was said that he sailed to New York to take on John S.Prince in 1883.

In the 1870s Keen set up a business developing and manufacturing bicycles in Surbiton. Kingston Museum has an example of a bicycle bearing a badge "John Keen Surbiton Hill 1872". A printed notice held in the papers of the Cyclists' Touring Club reassures the public that he is still making his Eclipse bicycles to which there are significant improvements this year (September 1877). C.F. Caunter wrote that "John Keen, at Surbiton, built machines lighter and higher than had previously been thought possible." He appears to have moved his business to Dalston Junction, then Clapham and latterly returning to Surbiton (Victoria Road). His cycles were known by the brand name ‘Eclipse’. Bartleet’s Bicycle Book (1931/32) describes a juvenile bicycle fitted with pedals " which are Keen's patent hanging pedals with a single ball bearing: these were the invention of "Jack" Keen, the famous professional rider, his patent No. 14867/1887."

His business moved to a workshop in Thames Ditton beside The Angel public house which was popular with cyclists using the Portsmouth Road. It is recorded in the census of 1901 that he lived at Claremont Terrace, Portsmouth Road, Long Ditton.

He died in Finchley on 13 January 1902, of tuberculosis.

Keen's cycle shop in Victoria Road was allegedly taken over by George Rice who continued to produce bicycles up until 1909. The oldest surviving example is a 1907 G.W.Rice " The Surbiton"

== Sources ==
- Date of birth: 1889 Calendar published by Bicycling News, reprinted Vol. 4 of George Moore Collection
- Kingston Cycling: Past and Present, pamphlet by Les Bowerman
- Bicycle: The History, book by David V. Herlihy
- John Keen – The Life of a Cycling Pioneer, by Les Bowerman (Proceedings of the 4th International Cycle History Conference, Boston, 1993)
- A History of Bicycles, book by Serena Beeley
- The History and Development of Cycles, Vol.1 C.F. Caunter (Ministry of Education: Science Museum) 1955
- Public Record Office RG 13/670 Census of 1901
