= Thomas Humber =

British engineer (1841–1910)

- Thomas Humber circa 1890
- Born: 16 October 1841; Sheffield, West Riding of Yorkshire, England
- Died: 24 November 1910 (aged 69); Kingston upon Thames, Surrey, England
- Occupations: Engineer, entrepreneur, manufacturer of Humber cycles
- Spouses: Emma Freeman (m. 1863; died 1903); Eleanor Robinson (m. 1903)
- Children: 2

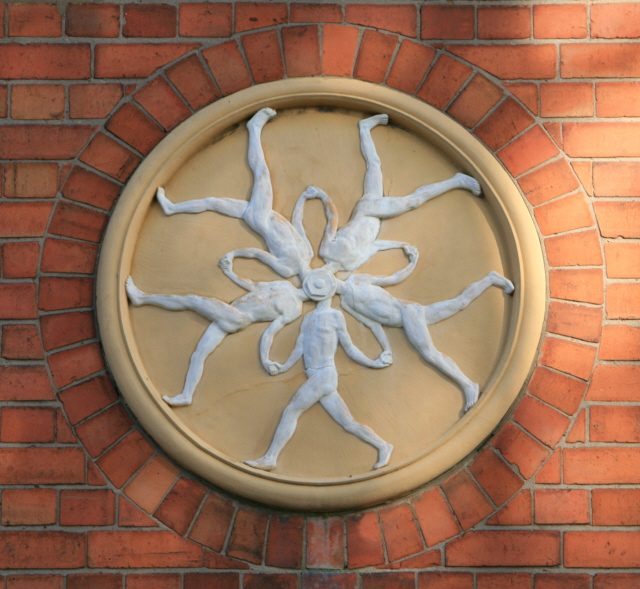

Thomas Humber (16 October 1841 – 24 November 1910) was an English engineer and cycle manufacturer who developed and patented a safety bicycle (1884) with a diamond-shaped frame and wheels of similar size. It became a pattern for subsequent machines. Humber made many other improvements to bicycles. About 1868 he founded Humber Cycles, the bicycle manufacturing business at Beeston, Nottinghamshire later owned by Humber & Co Limited.

Humber improved cycle technology through the independence of his thinking and his practical ability. The reliability of his products arose from his high standards and emphasis on quality. It all led to Humber becoming regarded as the aristocrat among bicycles.

== Early life ==
Thomas Humber was born on Andrew Street, Brightside, Sheffield on 16 October 1841 the son of Samuel Humber, a tailor, and his wife Lucy (née Turton). His parents moved to Kingston upon Hull when he was 5 years old and he attended the Salthouse Lane school. On leaving school he worked for a blacksmith William Campion. In 1854 the family moved again this time to Nottingham. About 1860 he went over to Alfreton Derbyshire and The Butterley Company where he impressed his employers by devising a more efficient method of building deck beams for the Royal Navy's ships. But he soon returned to Nottingham and set himself up there as a blacksmith and there, in 1863, he married Emma Elizabeth Freeman (c. 1842–1903). They were to have a daughter and a son.

== Humber cycles ==
=== Velocipede ===
Thomas Humber built himself a velocipede based on a picture in a letter about the Paris-developed machine that was published in the English Mechanic magazine in late 1868. It took him time to work out how to ride it but in the end he did manage to make the six miles from Nottingham to Radcliffe. He sold it and made an improved version—bought by the same buyer. It took him 2 months to make each velocipede, he was concerned to develop improvements: solid rubber tyres, ball-bearings, while maintaining quality and reliability. He instituted races to win public interest.

=== Ordinary or "Penny-farthing" ===
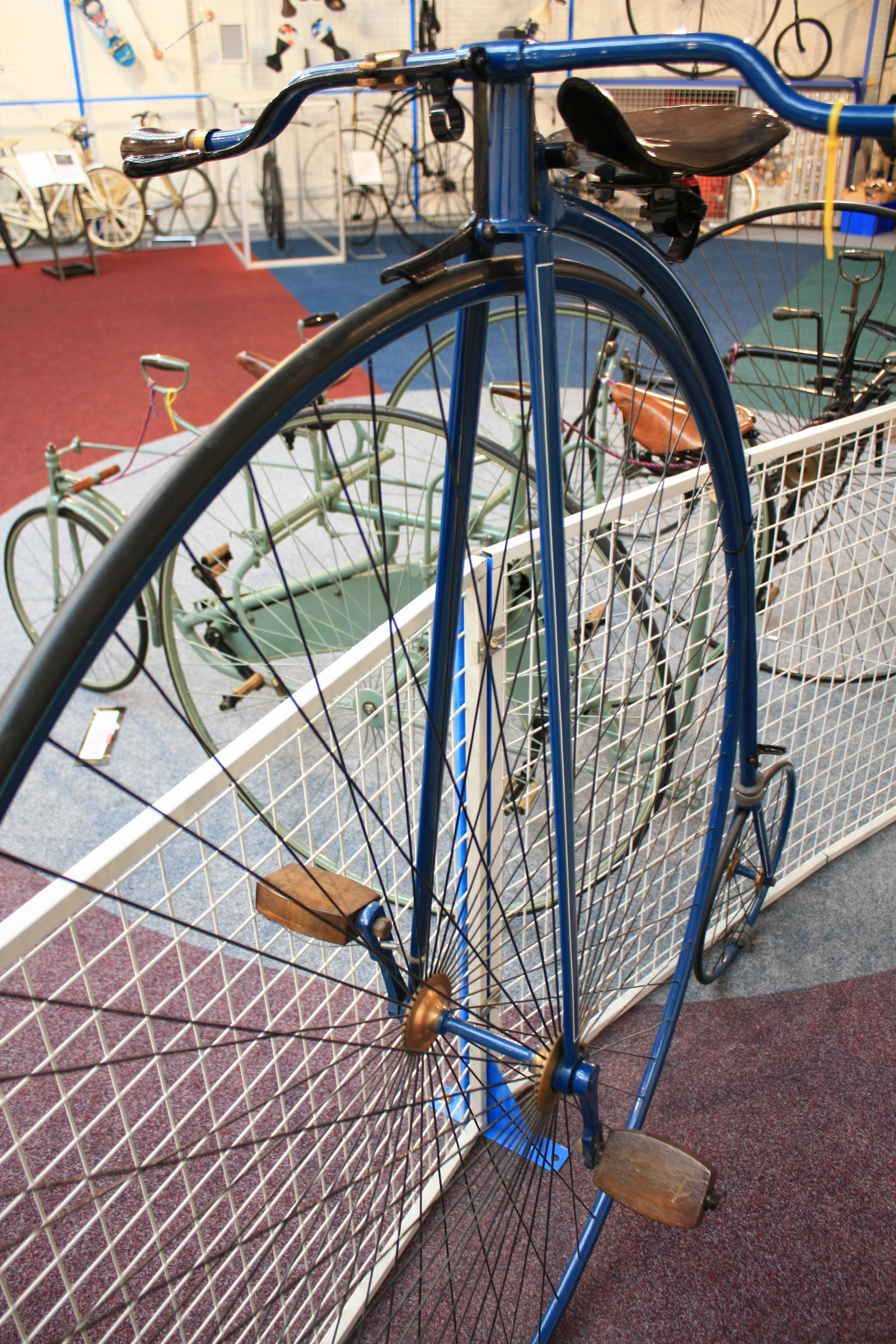
Ordinary by Humber, Marriott & Cooper

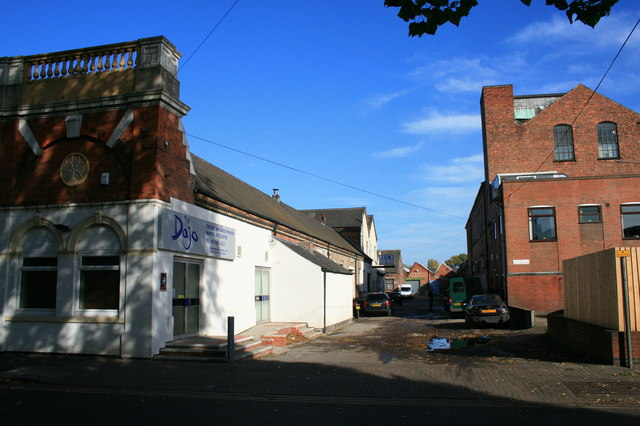
Humber cycles Beeston 2008 insignia high on the left front wall

Thomas's own design of "ordinary", now commonly known as a "penny-farthing", appeared in 1871 and not long after James Starley's metal ordinary. His first price-list contained a testimonial by Fred Cooper, a racing cyclist. Another racing contact was Thomas Marriott.

Marriott joined Thomas Humber as a business partner in 1875 and Fred Cooper joined them two years later. They named their new firm Humber, Marriott & Cooper.

Their staff of 80 or so needed more factory space so they built them a new works at Beeston.

=== Change partners ===
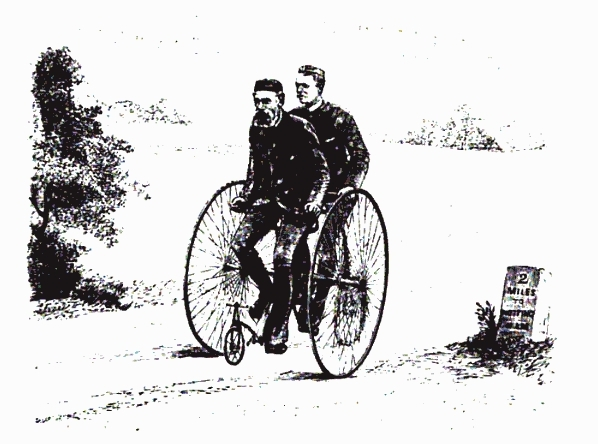
Thomas Humber and T. H. Lambert on a Humber tandem tricycle, circa 1885

It seemed Thomas's technical abilities were not matched by his business acumen. Cooper and Marriott left the firm in 1885 but he let them have equal rights to the name Humber. He also let them use the old partnership's patents. They set themselves up as cycle wholesalers but later they got Rudge of Coventry to make the cycles for them.

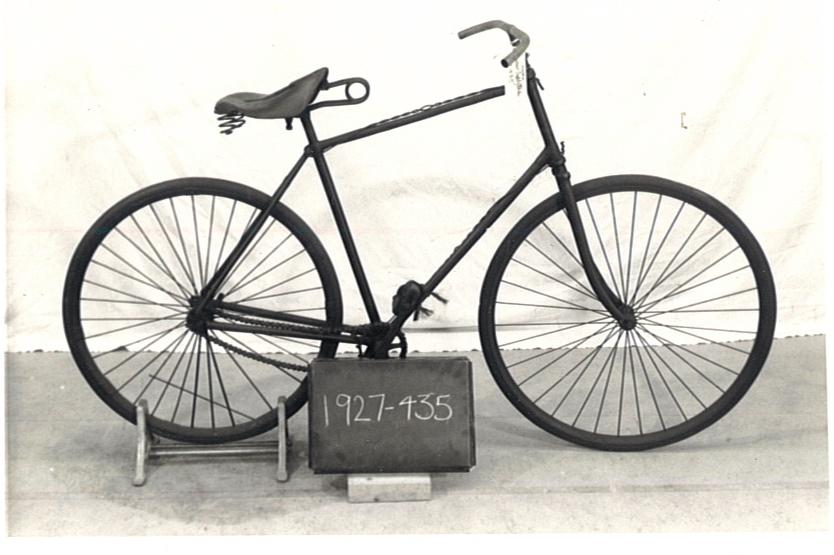
Humber Safety Bicycle The Science Museum

Now free, Thomas Humber got the backing of Nottingham lace bleacher dyer and finisher, T Harrison Lambert, and took charge of the whole business and its Beeston works. Lambert, father of A. J. Alan, was a cycle-racing friend building a reputation as a successful company promoter. Humber and Lambert opened a factory in Coventry in 1886.

By 1887 the cycle industry was consolidating and Humber and company promoter Lambert sold their business to investors who added a number of other substantial cycle manufacturers (Note: Thomas Humber and T Harrison Lambert trading as Humber & Co, Beeston, Nottingham, 350 men*, established 1868 also in London; Coventry Cycle Company Limited, Whitefriars Lane Coventry, 160 men, established 1871; Joseph Devey's Express Cycle Works, Wolverhampton, 170 men, established 1873; George Townend's Wellington Works, Coventry, which held "a practical monopoly" of machines for juveniles; * Humber alone made all the components for its machines instead of buying them Details were audited by London chartered accountant John R Ellerman " (Humber & Co Limited) . . . at once becomes the most powerful combination in this growing and lucrative industry.") and then floated the new combine on the stock exchange. Such was the public's recognition of Humber products and their high quality and reliability the whole new organisation was named Humber & Co Limited though Humber's was not the largest component. Thomas Humber agreed to manage the whole enterprise with its works in Coventry and Wolverhampton as well as Beeston.

Thomas Humber retired in 1892 at the end of his 5-year contract. Following financial difficulties, an outcome of the slump of 1898–1899, Humber & Co Limited's business was transferred to a new incorporation named Humber Limited.

== Retirement ==
Thomas Humber then involved himself in the development of the pneumatic tyre and floated Beeston Pneumatic Tyre Company Limited. (Note: The Beeston Pneumatic Tyre Co. Capital £60,000 directors: Thomas Humber; William Starley of Starley Brothers and Westwood Manufacturing Limited (son of James Starley); Col. C J Hill of the Coventry Machinists' Co (later Swift Cycle Co and The Swift Motor Co., Ltd); Lord Henry Fitzgerald; The company's business was to be based on two provisional patents, one granted to Thomas Humber the other to Sydney Lee, auctioneer and valuer) With Lambert he had other business interests. His old company took him to court in 1896 after his involvement in British Motor Syndicate Limited became public insisting on enforcing his agreement to not become a director of a business in a related field.

Lambert remained a director of Humber and its foreign subsidiaries and joined boards of industrial businesses including Watney breweries, by then the largest brewer in London, and Watney subsidiaries in USA. However Lambert's dealings in cycle company shares brought him into association with Ernest Terah Hooley and into bankruptcy in 1900.

Thomas's wife had unsuccessfully petitioned for divorce in 1886. Emma died on 8 August 1903. Thomas married Eleanor Robinson, 30 years his junior, in Paddington on 9 September 1903. They moved to Kingston upon Thames and Thomas died there 24 November 1910 aged 69.

=== Cycle racing ===
In 1891 Charles Terront won the world's first long-distance race, Paris–Brest–Paris, riding a Humber bicycle fitted with prototype removable pneumatic tyres made by Michelin.
