= Ernest Terah Hooley =

English fraudster (1859–1947)

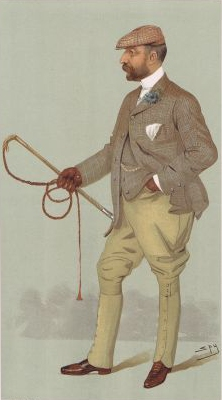
- "Papworth" – Hooley caricatured by Spy in Vanity Fair, 1896
- Born: 5 February 1859; Sneinton, Nottinghamshire, England
- Died: 11 February 1947 (aged 88); Long Eaton, Derbyshire, England
- Occupations: Financial promoter, fraudster
- Known for: Development of Trafford Park; serial bankruptcies and fraud
- Criminal charges: Fraud
- Criminal penalty: 2 prison terms (1912, 1922)
- Spouse: Annie Maria Hooley
- Children: 7

Ernest Terah Hooley (5 February 1859 – 11 February 1947) was an English financial fraudster. He achieved wealth and fame by buying promising companies and reselling them to the public at inflated prices, but a prosecution exposed his deceitful practices. He was made bankrupt four times and served two prison terms.

Hooley was the developer of the world's first industrial park, Trafford Park on the outskirts of Manchester.

== Early life ==
Hooley was born in Sneinton, Nottinghamshire, the only child of Terah Hooley, a lacemaker, and his wife Elizabeth. He joined his father's lace business and in 1881 married baker's daughter Annie Maria, with whom he had four daughters and three sons. Possibly with the assistance of an inheritance from his mother, Hooley bought Risley Hall in Derbyshire for £5,000 in 1888, and in the following year set himself up as a stockbroker in Nottingham.

== Business career ==
Hooley moved his business to London in 1896 and began to affect "a lavish lifestyle". The rise in his fortunes coincided with the boom in bicycles that year, and until the 1898 slump in that business he had promoted 26 manufacturers with a total nominal capital of £18.6 million; to impress investors he populated the boards of his companies with members of the aristocracy. One of his most profitable deals was the purchase of the Trafford Park estate from Sir Humphrey Francis de Trafford in 1896. Hooley's original plan was to convert the park into a high-class residential area containing 500 grand villas, a racecourse, and an industrial fringe along the banks of the Manchester Ship Canal, but he was persuaded instead to develop the site as an industrial estate, the first in the world and still the largest in Europe.

In 1895, he purchased Papworth Hall in Cambridgeshire, which he held until a forced sale in 1916. He was appointed High Sheriff of Cambridgeshire and Huntingdonshire for 1897.

In 1896, he purchased the 2,000 acre Anmer Hall estate in Norfolk for £25,000, later reselling it to the Prince of Wales at cost. The Prince of Wales had attempted to purchase the property prior to Hooley buying it, but it has been suggested his subsequent effort to secure it may have been to avoid the possibility of Hooley's business promoter Alexander Meyrick Broadley, whom he had earlier forced from high society, from becoming a constant guest and neighbour. In the later prosecution of Hooley, Broadley was denounced by Sir Robert Wright, Justice of the Court of the Queen's Bench, as the real author of Hooley's schemes.

In 1897, Hooley was selected by the Conservative Party as their candidate to contest the parliamentary constituency of Ilkeston, Derbyshire at the next general election. However, his bankruptcy the following year made him ineligible to stand.

Hooley's bankruptcy was also a fraudulent affair. He did not, as has been much suggested, make over Risley and Papworth to his wife, but his trustee in bankruptcy sold them to her instead. Life for them went on very much as before; the press termed him "The Splendid Bankrupt". Hooley also continued his deceitful business activities, although on a smaller scale. He was made bankrupt again in 1911, 1921, and 1939, and jailed for fraud in 1912 and 1922.

Hooley estimated that during his career over £100,000,000 had passed through his hands, and he remained unrepentant: "my spirit remains uncrushed... Conscious that if I had done a certain amount of harm to my fellow-beings, any rate I had also done a very considerable amount of good... Seemingly all the English people on the Riviera lunched and dined my expense, and some of them even came to breakfast."

Despite his crimes, he also had admirers. The public prosecutor Sir Richard Muir, considered him the most attractive personality he encountered in his professional career, writing in his memoirs: "He might have made the greatest Chancellor of the Exchequer this country has ever known... 'The Splendid Bankrupt' certainly had a wonderful way with him."

However, Hooley's legacy was a string of ruined companies and firms floundering through overcapitalisation and shrunken share values, with the consequent losses for their investors.

== Companies floated by E T Hooley and the gross profits of each promotion ==
Dunlop Pneumatic Tyre	£5,000,000
Schweppes	£1,250,000
Bovril	£2,500,000
Trent Cycle	£100,000
Cycle Manufacturers' Tube	£250,000
Swift Cycle	£375,000
Dunlop Pneumatic (France)	£650,000
Clement-Gladiator and Humber	£900,000
Blaisdell Pencils	£100,000
Dee Estates	unknown
Trafford Park Estates	unknown
Raleigh Cycle	£200,000
Singer Cycle	£800,000
Humber (America)	£200,000
Humber (Russia)	£75,000
Humber (Portugal)	£100,000

(from the statement prepared by the Official Receiver of his estate.)

By 1911, he was in serious legal and financial difficulties. He spent a month in Brixton Gaol for contempt of court and later in the same year received a twelve-month sentence for obtaining money on false pretences as part of a land deal. In the following year, he was judged bankrupt for the second time. He re-entered business as an estate agent, but by 1921 was again bankrupt, and in 1922 was convicted of fraud and sentenced to three years imprisonment. Following his release, Hooley returned to the business of property sales, continuing to work until his eighties. He was made bankrupt for a fourth time in 1939.

Hooley died at Long Eaton, Derbyshire, aged 88.
