= Humber cycles =

English bicycle brand

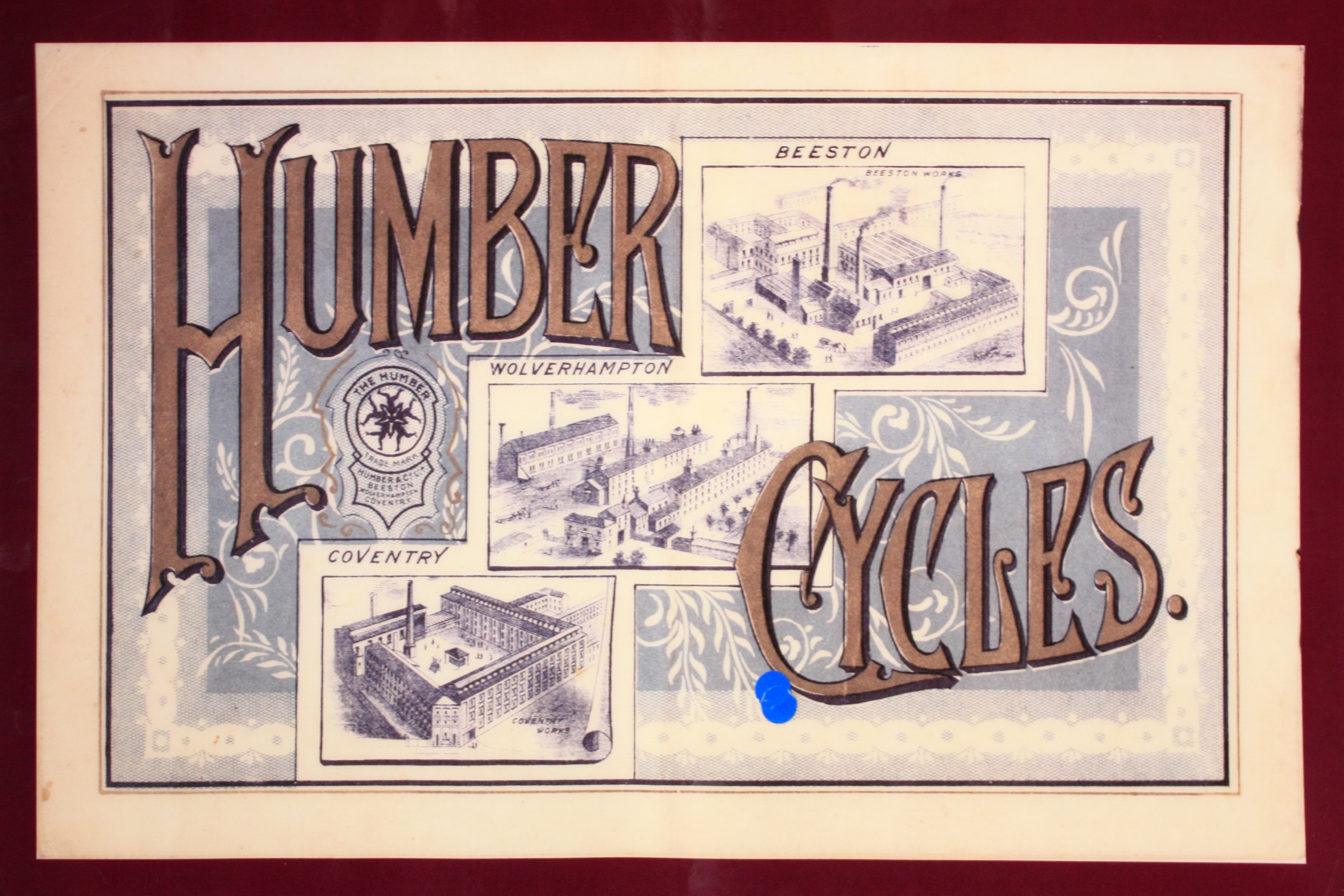

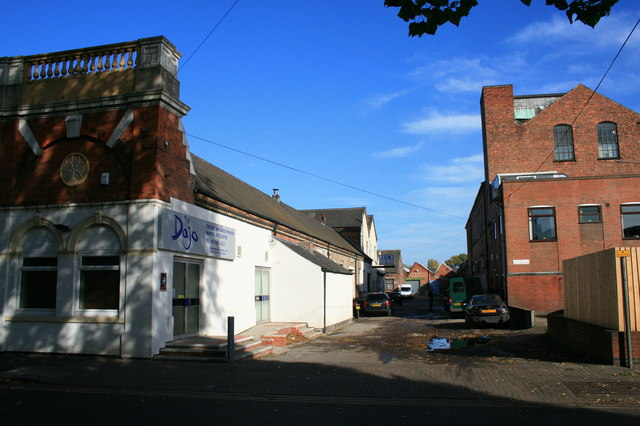
Beeston 2008, with insignia high on the left front wall

Humber was an English brand of bicycles and tricycles. Thomas Humber made himself a velocipede in 1868. From that time he built a substantial business in manufacturing tricycles and bicycles while continuously improving their design and construction. His products were so well-made and well-designed they were known as "the aristocrat among bicycles".

Though Thomas Humber retired from the cycle business in 1892 and went on to other things, his brand name remained a high-valued trademark for more than ninety years.

== History ==
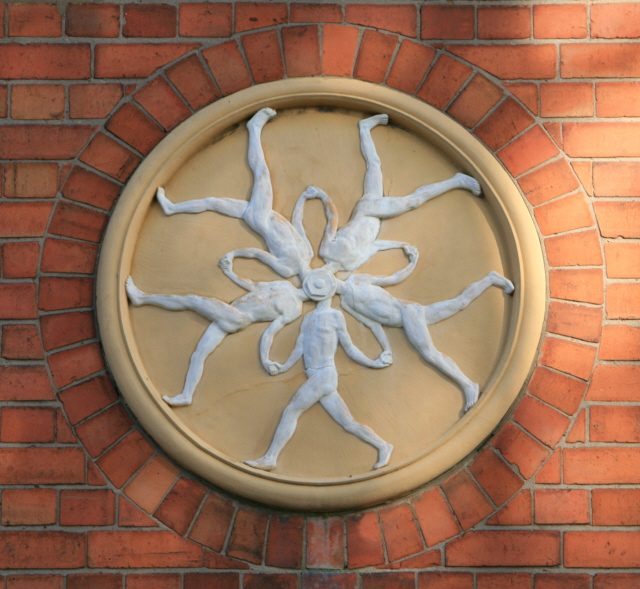

Thomas Humber (1841–1910) founded a bicycle manufacturing business at Nottingham which moved about 1878 to Beeston, Nottinghamshire. By 1887, still under his day-to-day management, it was owned by a public listed company, Humber & Co Limited. Thomas Humber improved cycle technology through the independence of his thinking and his practical ability. The reliability of his products arose from his high standards and emphasis on quality. It all led to Humber becoming regarded as the aristocrat among bicycles.

Velocipede

Thomas Humber, at that time by trade a Nottingham blacksmith, had built himself a velocipede based on a picture in a letter about the Paris-developed machine that was published in the English Mechanic magazine in late 1868. He sold it and made an improved version—bought by the same buyer. It took him 2 months to make each velocipede, he was concerned to develop improvements: solid rubber tyres, ball-bearings, while maintaining quality and reliability. He instituted races to win public interest.

=== Ordinary or "penny-farthing" ===
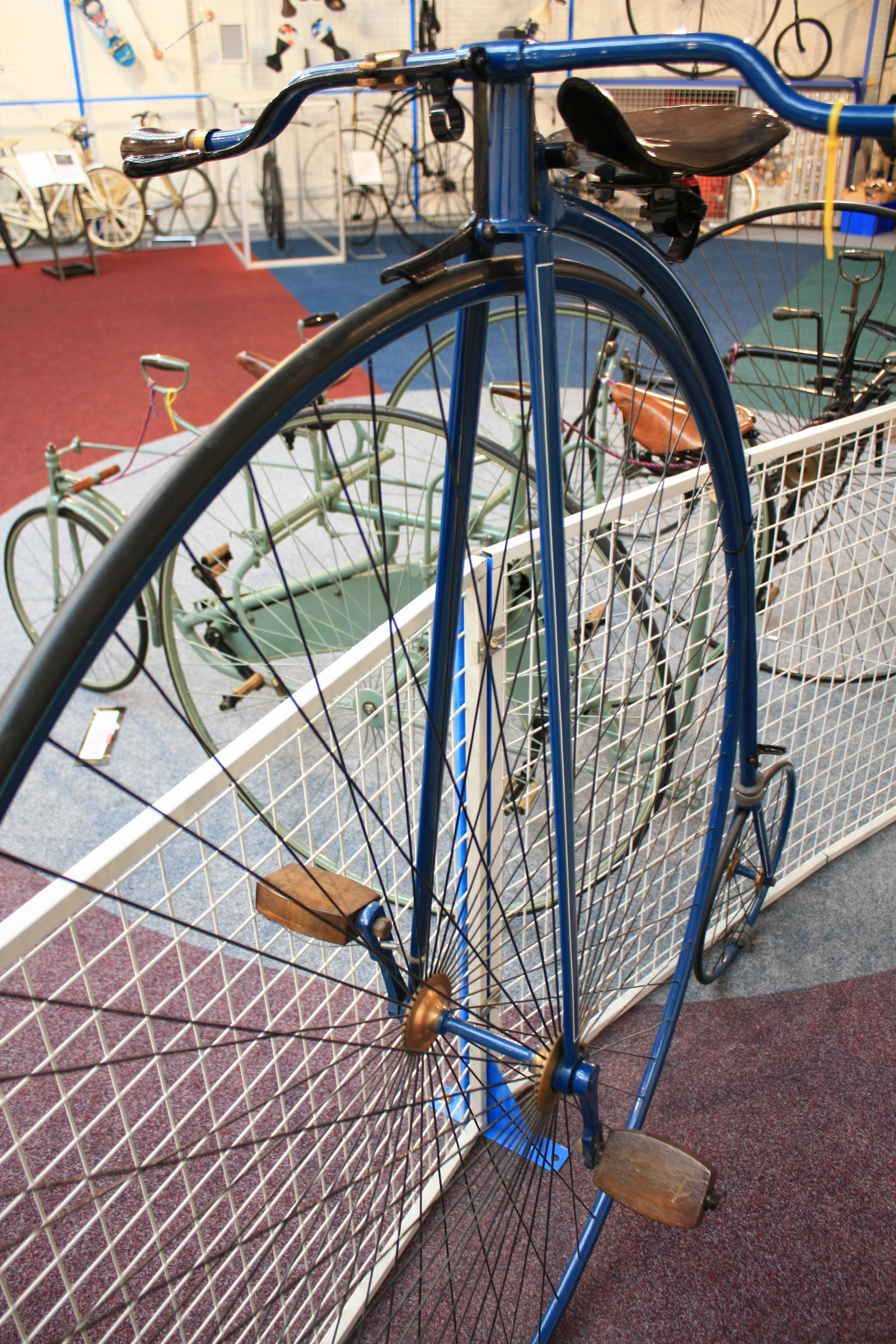
Ordinary by Humber, Marriott & Cooper

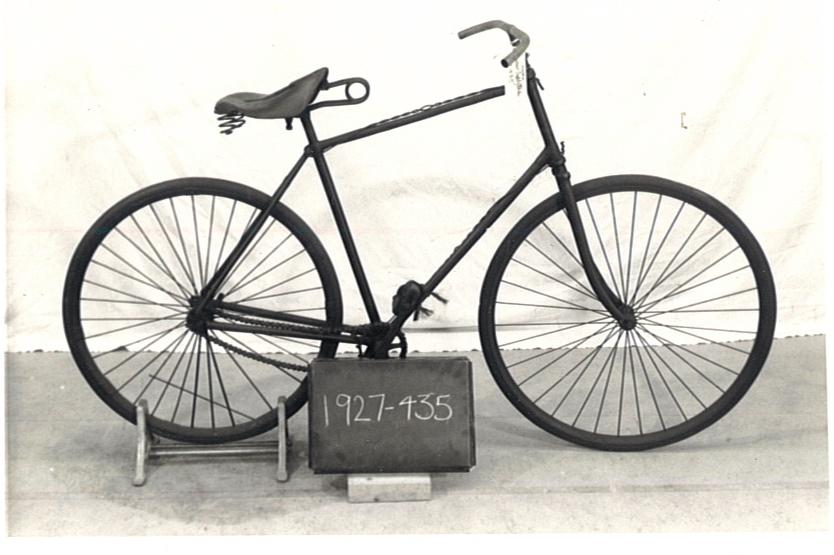
Humber Safety Bicycle The Science Museum

Thomas's own design of "ordinary", now commonly known as a "penny-farthing", appeared in 1871 and not long after James Starley's metal ordinary. His first price-list contained a testimonial by Fred Cooper, a racing cyclist. Another racing contact was Thomas Marriott.

=== Safety bicycle ===
Thomas Humber developed and patented the safety bicycle (1884) with a diamond-shaped frame and wheels of similar size.

== Ownership ==
Humber, Marriott and Cooper

Thomas Marriott joined Thomas Humber as a business partner in 1875 and Fred Cooper joined them two years later. They named their new firm Humber, Marriott & Cooper. Their staff of 80 or so needed more factory space so they built them a new works at Beeston.

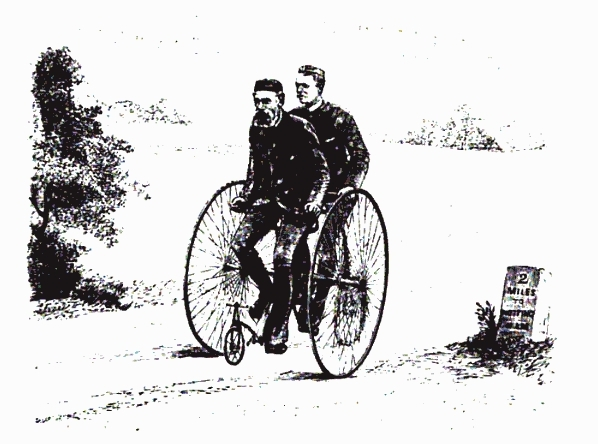
Thomas Humber and T.H.Lambert on a Humber Tandem Tricycle, circa 1885

Cooper and Marriott left the firm in 1885 but Thomas let them have equal rights to the name Humber. He also let them use the old partnership's patents. They set themselves up as cycle wholesalers and later got Rudge of Coventry to make the cycles for them.

Humber and Lambert

Thomas Humber took in a new partner, Nottingham lace bleacher dyer and finisher, T Harrison Lambert, and they took charge of the whole Humber business and its Beeston works. Lambert was a cycle-racing friend building a reputation as a successful company promoter.

Humber & Company Limited, public listed company

The cycle industry was consolidating and Humber and Lambert soon sold the business to speculators: William and Joseph Horton, Edward Alfred Hicks and Christopher Norris Baker, who added a number of other substantial cycle manufacturers (Note: Thomas Humber and T Harrison Lambert trading as Humber & Co, Beeston, Nottingham, 350 men*, established 1868 also in London; Coventry Cycle Company Limited, Whitefriars Lane Coventry, 160 men, established 1871; Joseph Devey's Express Cycle Works, Wolverhampton, 170 men, established 1873; George Townend's Wellington Works, Coventry, which held "a practical monopoly" of machines for juveniles; Details such as production quantities were audited by London chartered accountant John R Ellerman * Humber alone made all the components for its machines instead of buying them " (Humber & Co Limited) . . . at once becomes the most powerful combination in this growing and lucrative industry.") and then floated the new combine on the stock exchange. Such was the public's recognition of Humber products and their high quality and reliability the whole new organisation was named Humber & Co Limited though Humber's was not the largest component.

Production, deliveries and order book just before combination

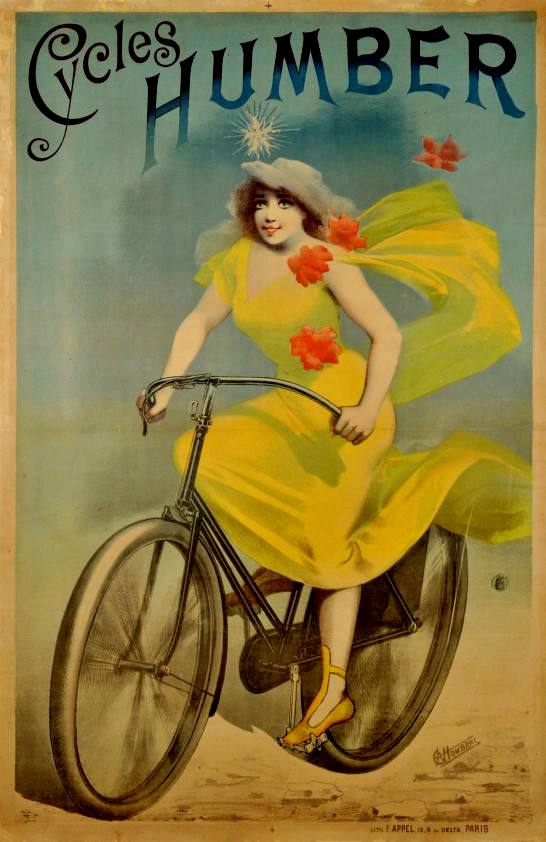
Humber France

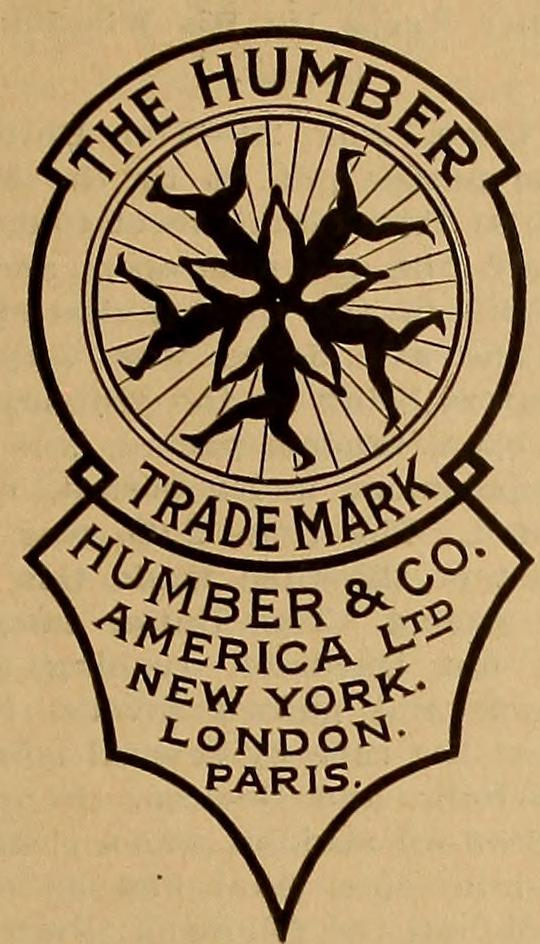
Humber USA

Manufacturer	Production April 1887	Production May 1887	Deliveries April 1887	Deliveries May 1887	Unexec. orders April 1887	Unexec. orders May 1887
Humber & Co Beeston	237	263	242	328	246	284
Coventry Cycle Co Ltd	453	416	435	409	593	535
Express Cycle Works	293	381	483	495	293	278
Wellington Works	120	120	218	254	151	192
Total	1,103	1,180	1,378	1,486	1,283	1,289

Thomas Humber agreed to manage the whole enterprise with its works in Coventry and Wolverhampton as well as Beeston. Aged 51, Thomas Humber retired in 1892 at the end of his 5-year contract.

Humber and Company (America) Limited, Humber and Company (France) Limited, Humber and Company (Extension) Limited etc.

A period of strong overseas expansion began in 1894 followed by an administrative separation of manufacturing from wholesaling and retailing. An 1896 joint venture with major French cycle companies, Clement and Gladiator failed.

There was a cycling boom over 1895-97 —see the enthusiastic move into France— as pneumatic tyres attracted a new class of riders but it was followed by a slump over 1898-99.

Humber Limited

Following these financial difficulties in 1899 Humber & Co Limited's business was transferred to a new incorporation named Humber Limited.

Raleigh

By 1914 Humber had become Britain's second largest motorcar manufacturer and cycles became less important. In February 1932 renewed financial difficulties in part due to the Great Depression and a brief surge in cycle sales saw Humber's cycle trademarks and patents sold to Raleigh. Humber continued as a premium brand made by Raleigh into the 1960s.

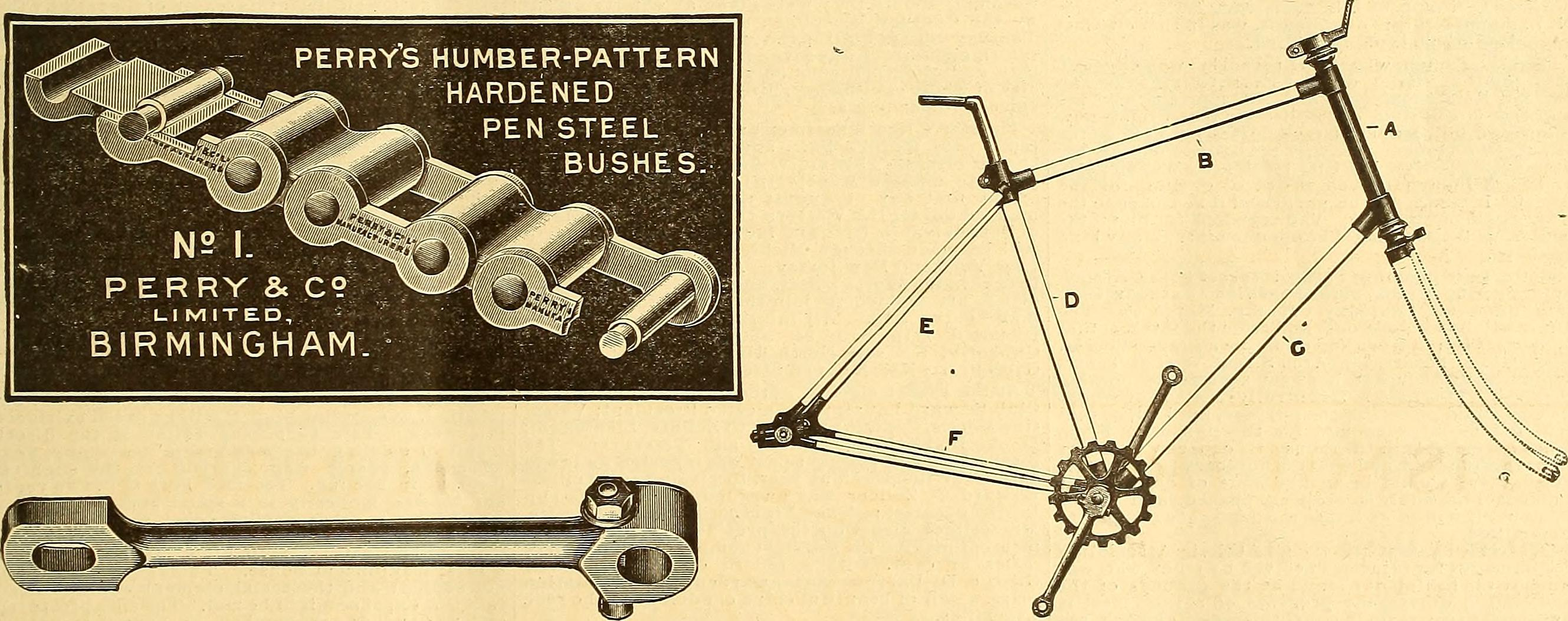
Humber frame 1888

== Frame ==
Humber also manufactured, at one time, an unusual type of bicycle frame known variously as "cross frames", "girder frames", or "truss frames". Their variant was also duplex, consisting in part of smaller side-by-side tubes similar to the duplex fork pictured on this page.

=== Motorcycles ===
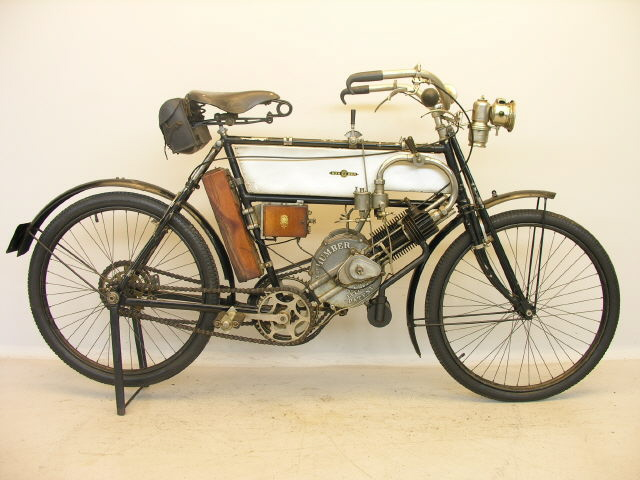
2¾ h.p. motorcycle 1904

In 1896 Humber produced the first practical motorcycle by fitting a bicycle with an E. J. Pennington two-horsepower motor.

== Gallery ==
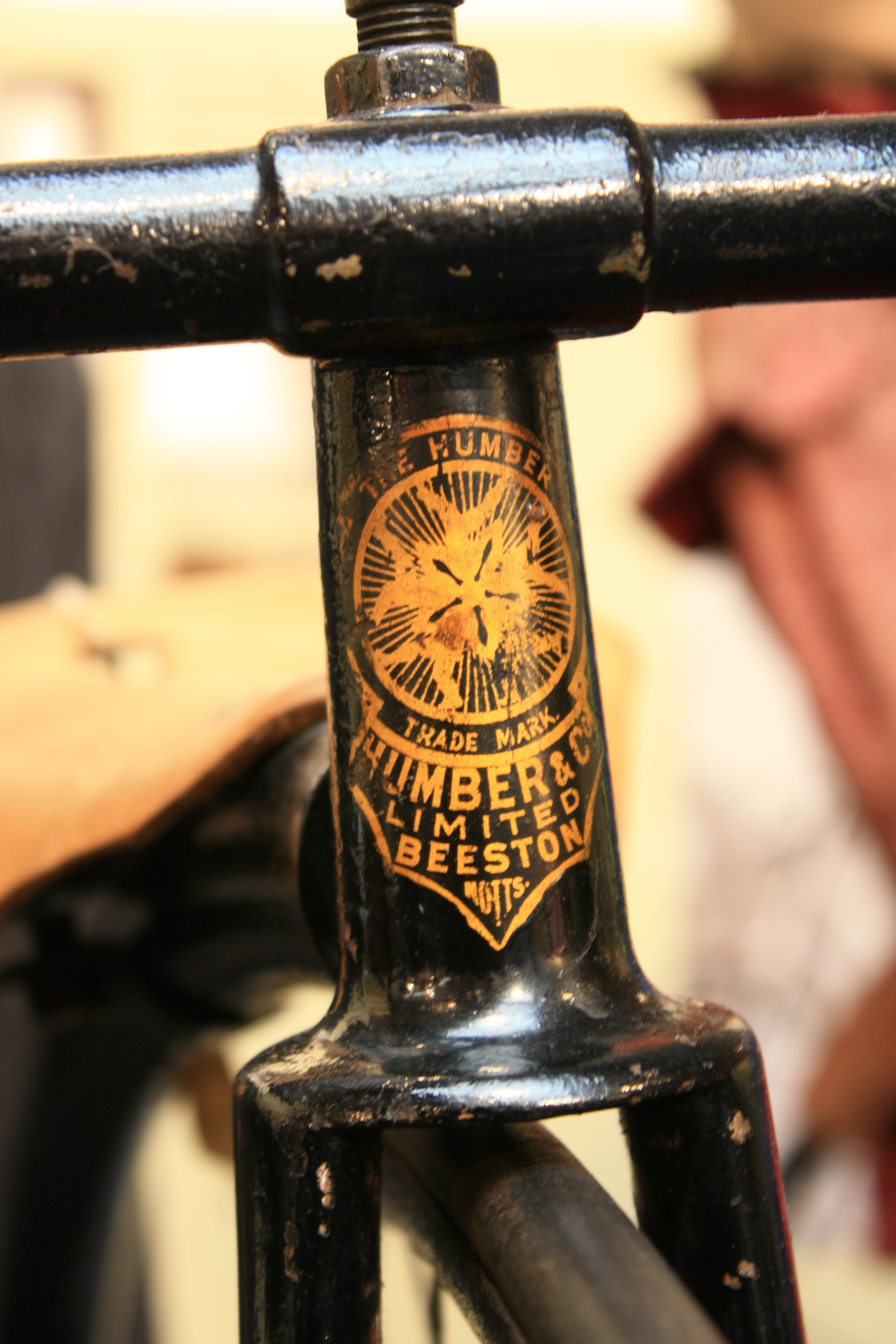
Badge on a Beeston penny farthing

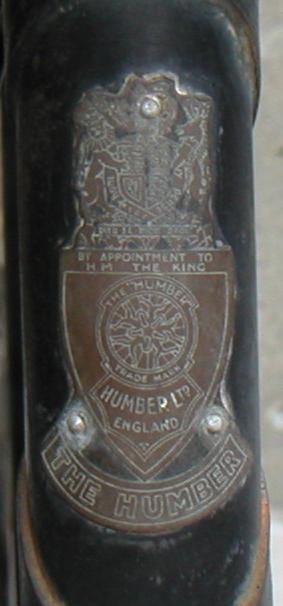
Badge Humber Limited and royal warrant

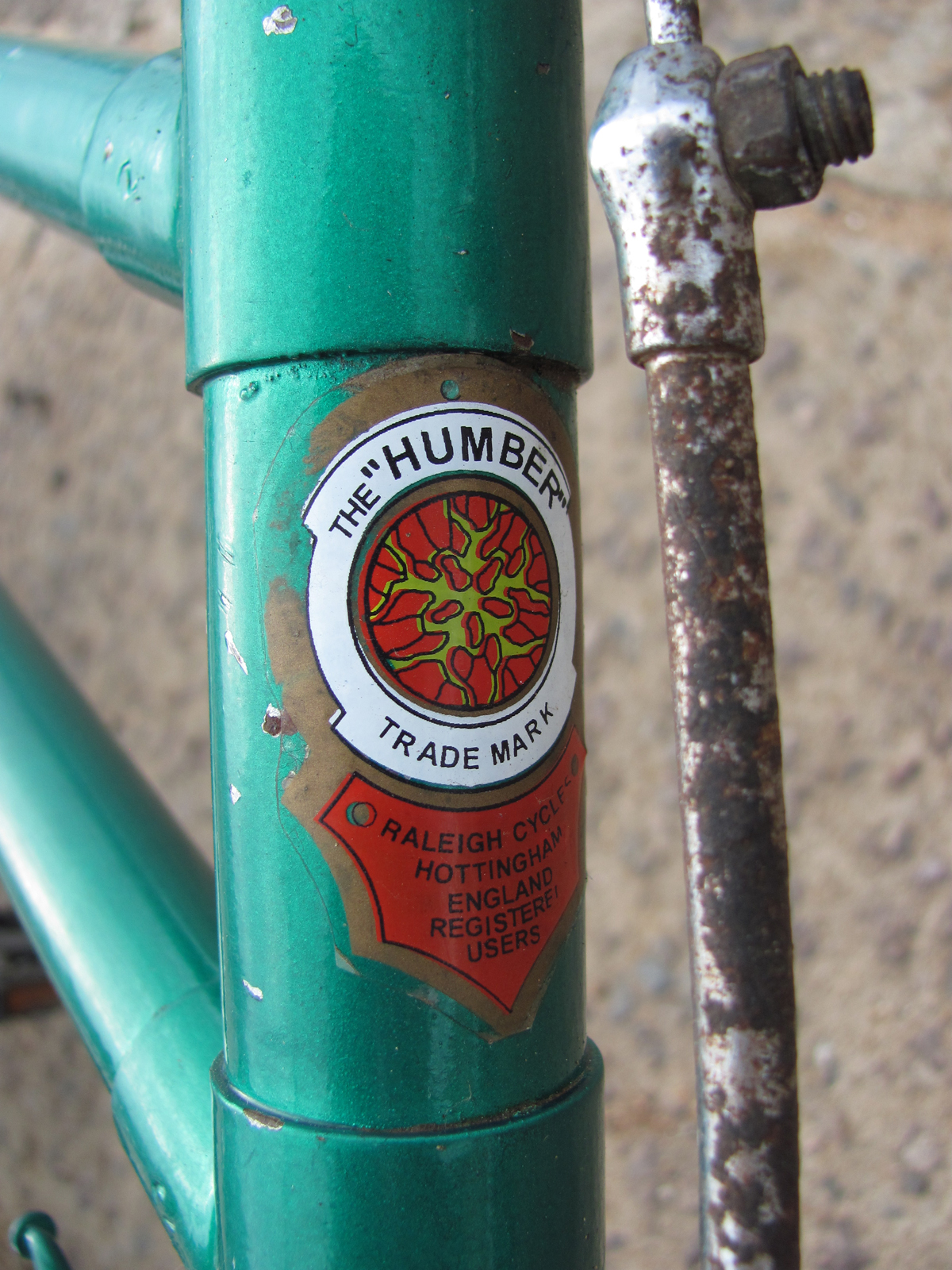
Badge Humber by Raleigh

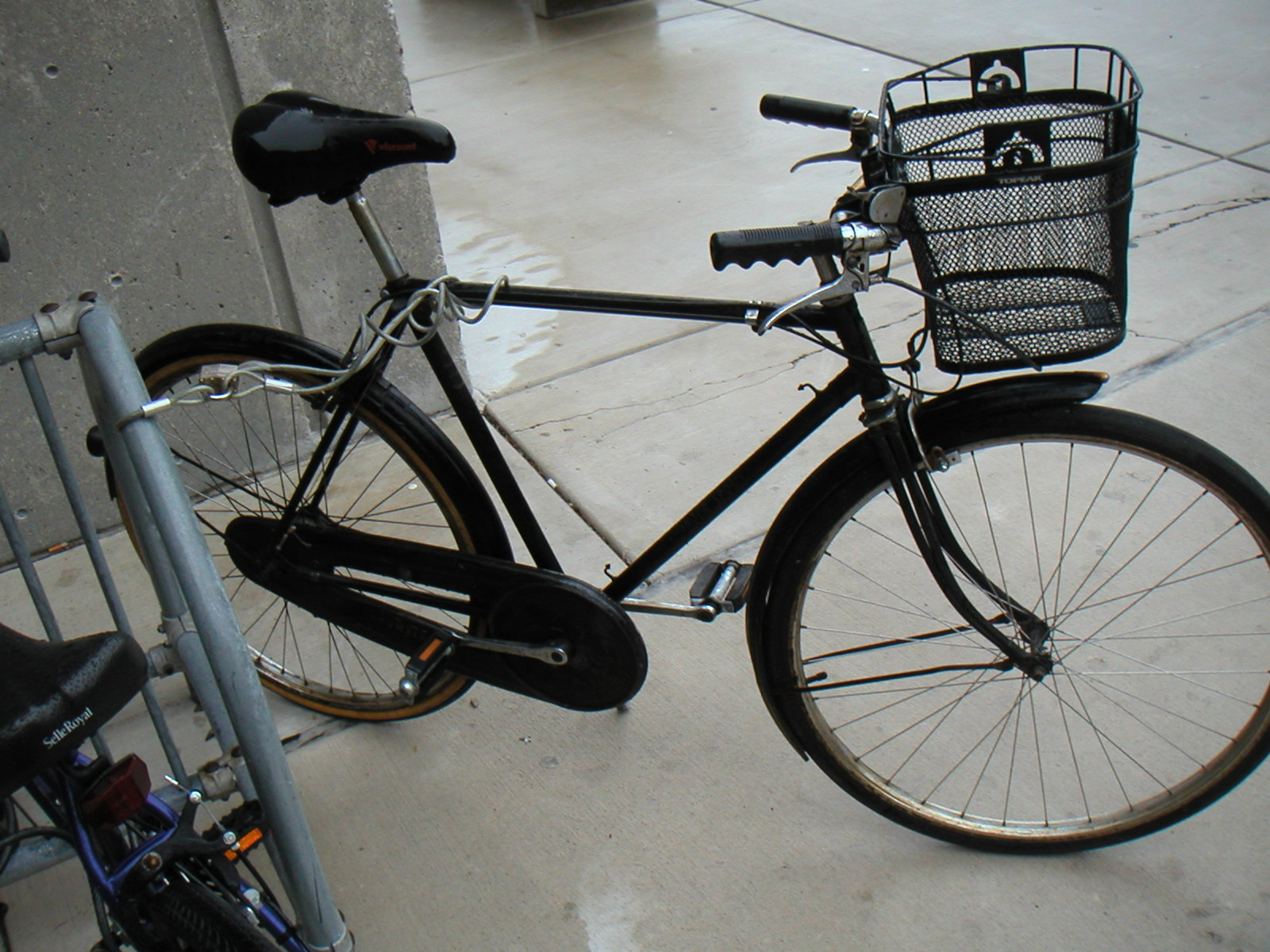
Humber sports Sturmey Archer 3-speed

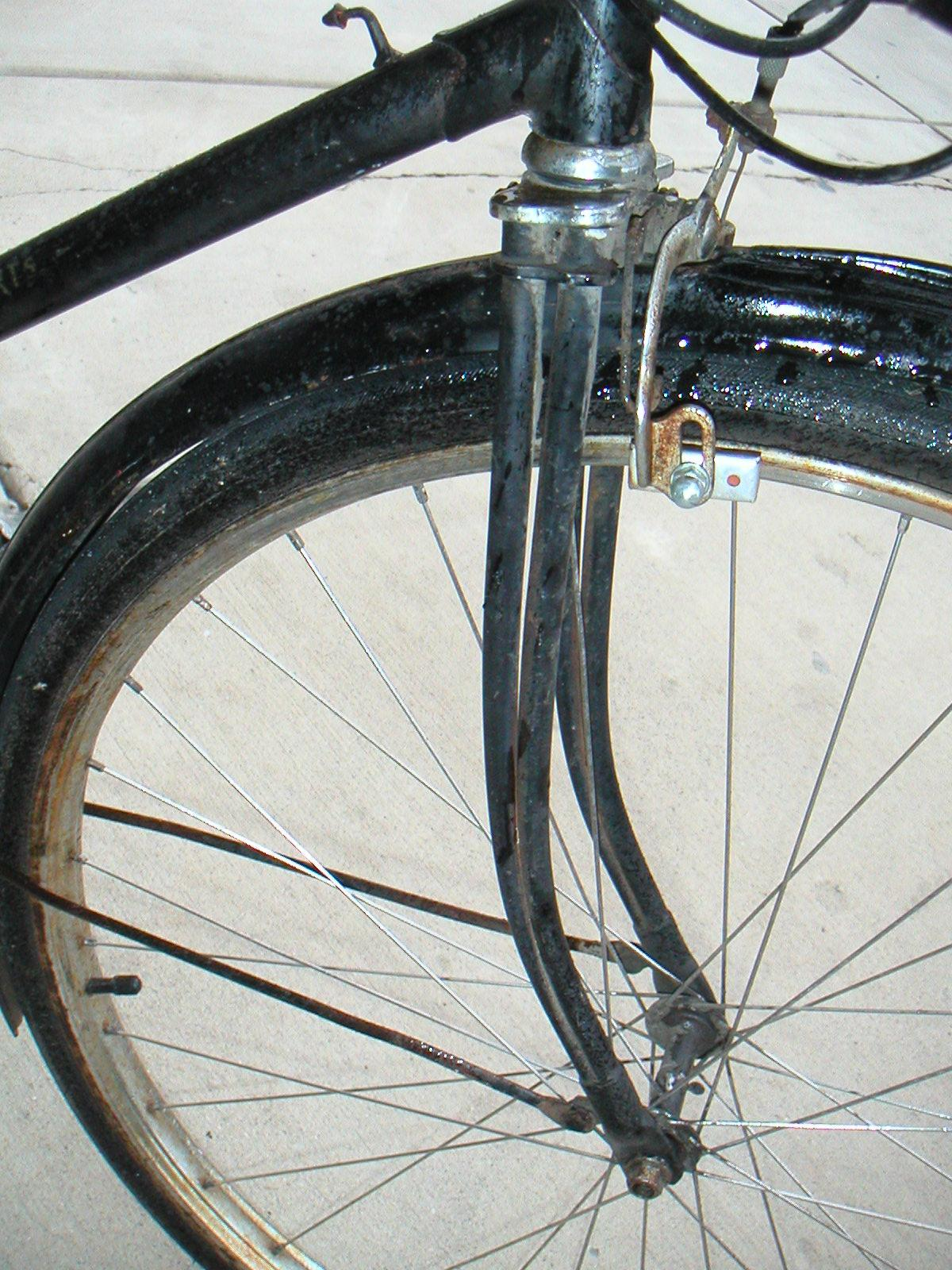
Humber sports duplex forks

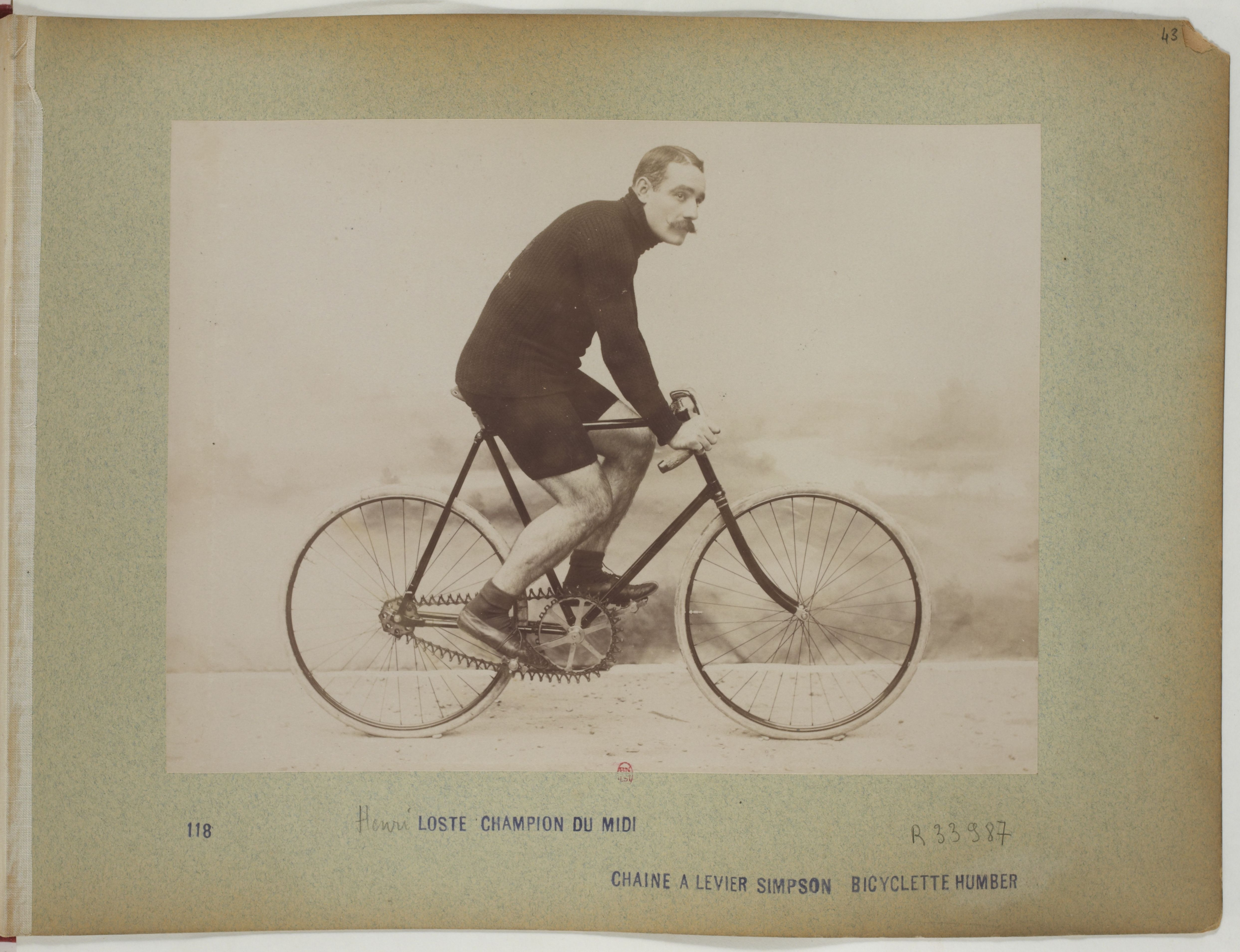
Henri Loste, Champion du Midi, on a Humber bicycle with a Simpson lever chain c. 1894

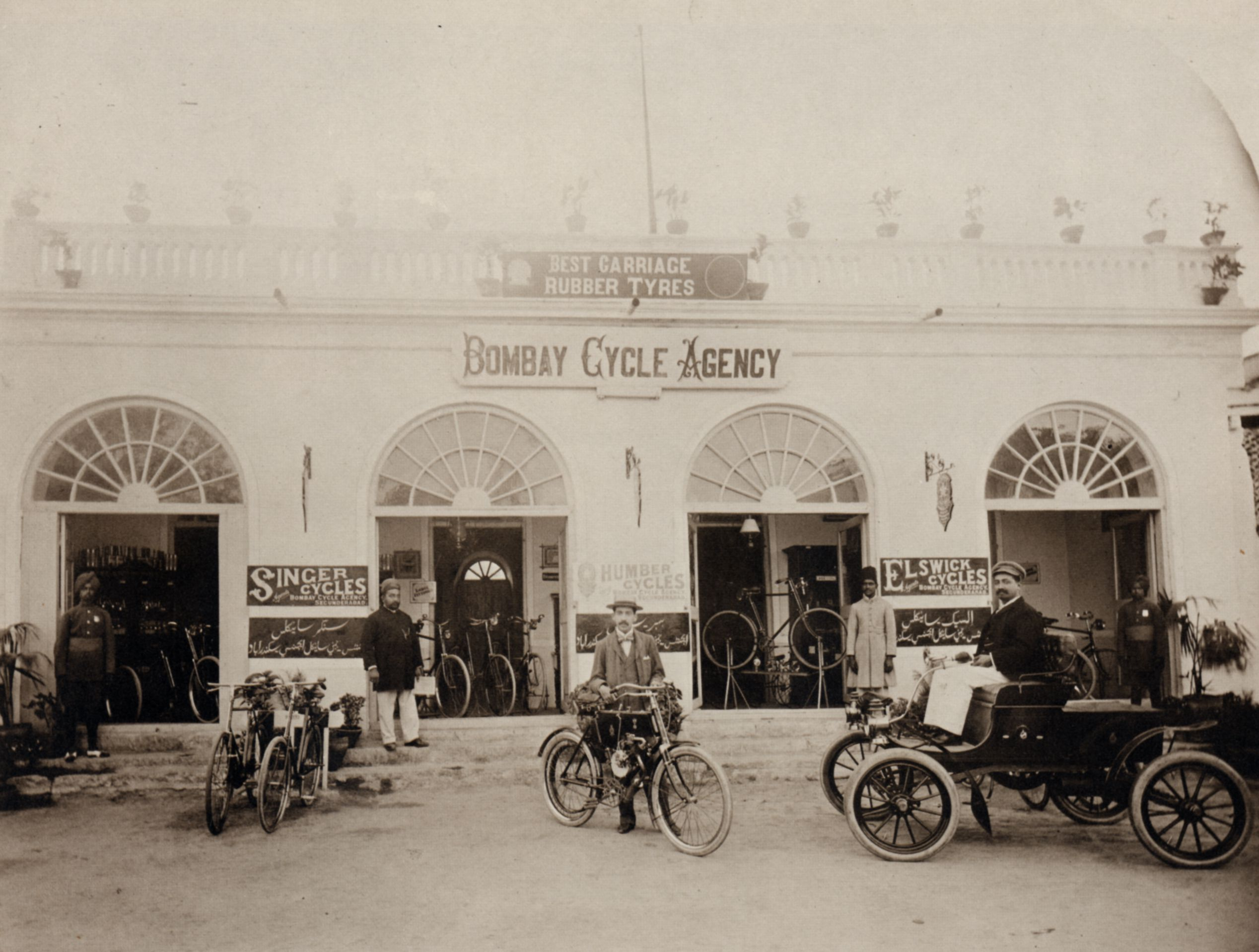
Dealership of Humber cycles in Secunderabad, British India

== See also ==
- Humber motorcycles
- Humber Limited
- Thomas Humber
- List of bicycle manufacturing companies
- Raleigh Cycles - Biggest UK manufacture at one period.
