= Penny-farthing =

Early type of bicycle

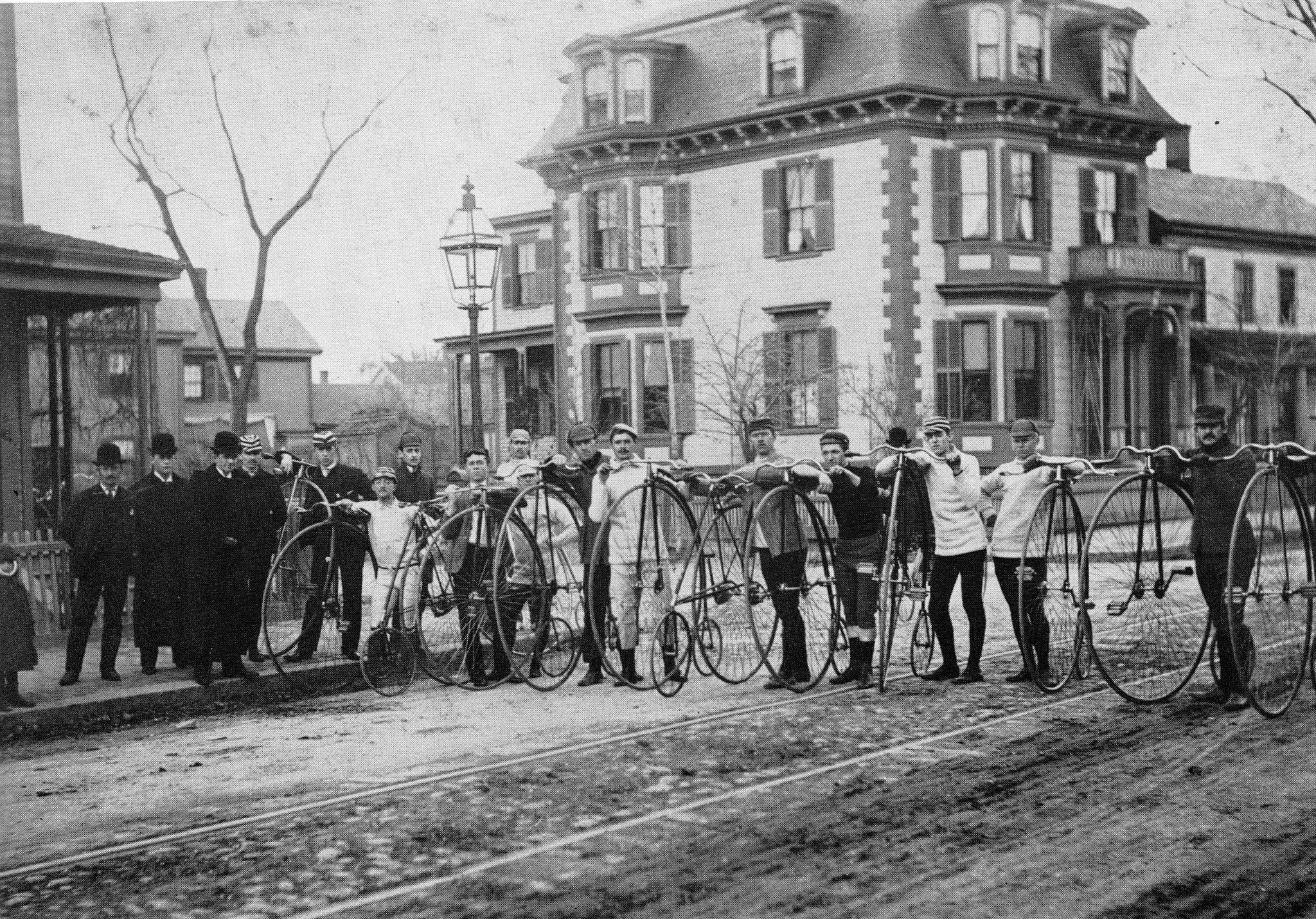
15-mile Penny Farthing Race, Harvard University Cycling Association in 1887

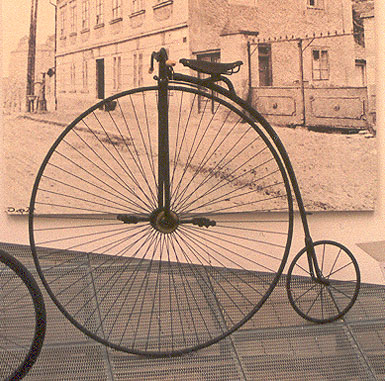
A penny-farthing in the Škoda Auto Museum, Czech Republic

The penny-farthing, also known as a high wheel, high wheeler or ordinary, is an early type of bicycle distinguished by its large front wheel and comparatively small back wheel. It was popular in the 1870s and 1880s, with its large front wheel providing high speeds, owing to its travelling a long distance for every rotation of the wheel. These bicycles had solid rubber tires and as a consequence the only shock absorption was in the saddle.

The penny-farthing became obsolete in the late 1880s with the development of modern bicycles, which provided similar speed, via a chain-driven gear train, and comfort, from the use of pneumatic tires. These later bikes were marketed as "safety bicycles" because of the greater ease of mounting and dismounting, the reduced danger of falling, and the reduced height to fall, in comparison to penny-farthings.

The name came from the British penny and farthing coins, the penny being much larger than the farthing, so that the side view of the bicycle resembles a larger penny (the front wheel) leading a smaller farthing (the rear wheel). Although the name "penny-farthing" is now the most common, it was probably not used until the machines had been almost superseded. The first recorded print reference is from 1891 in Bicycling News. For most of their reign they were simply known as "bicycles" and were the first machines to be so called, although they were not the first two-wheeled, pedalled vehicles. In the late 1890s, the name "ordinary" began to be used, to distinguish them from the emerging safety bicycles, and that term, along with "hi-wheel" and variants, are preferred by many modern enthusiasts.

In 1869, at the height of the popularity of the boneshaker, the Frenchman Eugène Meyer patented a wire-spoke bicycle wheel which led to the development of the high bicycle. The Franco-Prussian war led mass production to switch to Britain, where James Starley, described as the father of the British bicycle industry, and others, made incremental improvements. During the 1870s manufacturers produced bicycles with ever larger front wheels and ever smaller rear wheels, because with direct-drive the larger the front wheel, the further (and so faster) it went. Wheel size was determined by leg length: 60" was the largest standard size. In 1878, Albert Pope began manufacturing the Columbia bicycle outside Boston, starting their two-decade heyday in the United States.

Although the trend was short-lived, the penny-farthing became a symbol of the late Victorian era. Its popularity also coincided with the birth of cycling as a sport.

== History ==
=== Origins and development ===
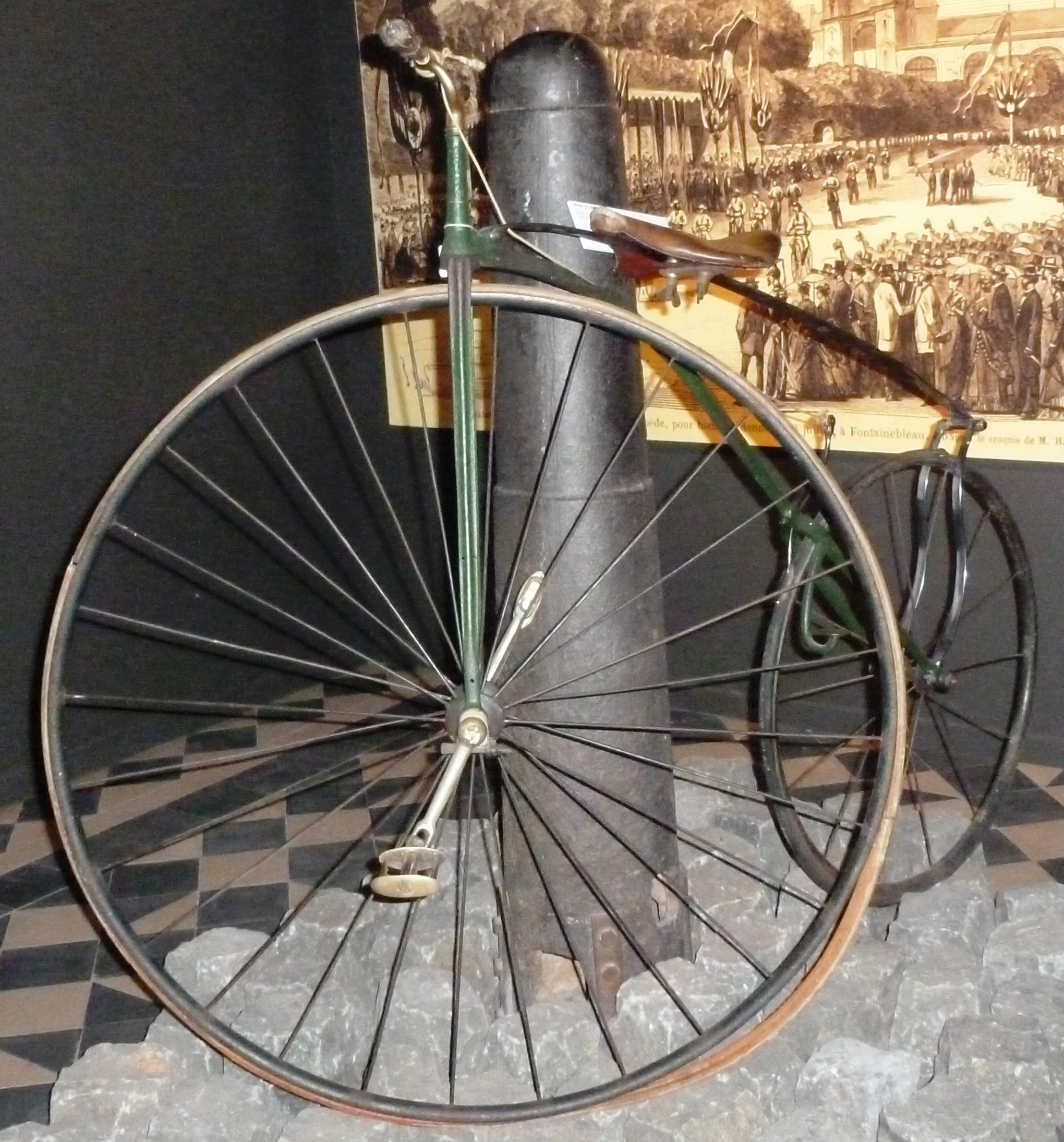
Velocipede c.1870 by Eugène Meyer of Paris, Wielermuseum, Roeselare, Belgium, 2012

The first step towards the penny-farthing was taken by Louis Rives of Toulouse, who in 1868 obtained French patent No. 81635 for a velocipede with the profile of a miniature penny-farthing. Its front wheel was 35" and its rear 16", with wooden rims and metal spokes. The smaller rear wheel placed close to the front wheel reduced the wheelbase, reducing the moment of inertia resisting rotational acceleration.

The second step was taken by the leading Parisian bicycle maker, Eugène Meyer, who is now regarded as the father of the high bicycle. In 1869 he obtained French patent No. 86705 for a wire-spoke tension wheel with individually-adjustable spokes. (Note: Thomas Hewes had used forged T-headed spokes under tension in water wheels in the early nineteenth century. Theodore Jones patented metal-spoked tension wheels in 1826. William Stanley had developed (but not patented) wire wheels in 1849. Meyer's patent was for his method of creating a robust bicycle wheel using individually-tensioned spokes. Other Parisian manufacturers soon produced their own variants.) His all-metal bicycle wheel and the use of hollow tubing took a third off the weight of a velocipede. It also removed the limit of about 48" which wooden construction imposed on the maximum diameter of a wheel. (Note: By the end of the nineteenth century, the rims of large wooden wheels were routinely laminated from bent wood rather than made using cut felloes.) At the bicycle exhibition at the Pré Catalan in November 1869 the unknown maker Alexandre Moyon exhibited what Le Vélocipède illustré called for the first time a "grand bicycle", the French term for a penny-farthing.

In November 1869 James Moore won the Paris - Rouen race on a conventionally-constructed velocipede with a front wheel about 42" in diameter and a rear wheel half the size. By Spring 1870, most French racers had adopted such wheel sizes. In July 1870 Moore rode a 43" Meyer "spider-wheel" grand bicycle at the British championships. His performance was so outstanding that British manufacturers rapidly copied the design. A teenager from Wolverhampton, who had been riding a 36" machine, appeared on a 50" machine and promptly beat the four-minute mile. The penny-farthing had arrived.

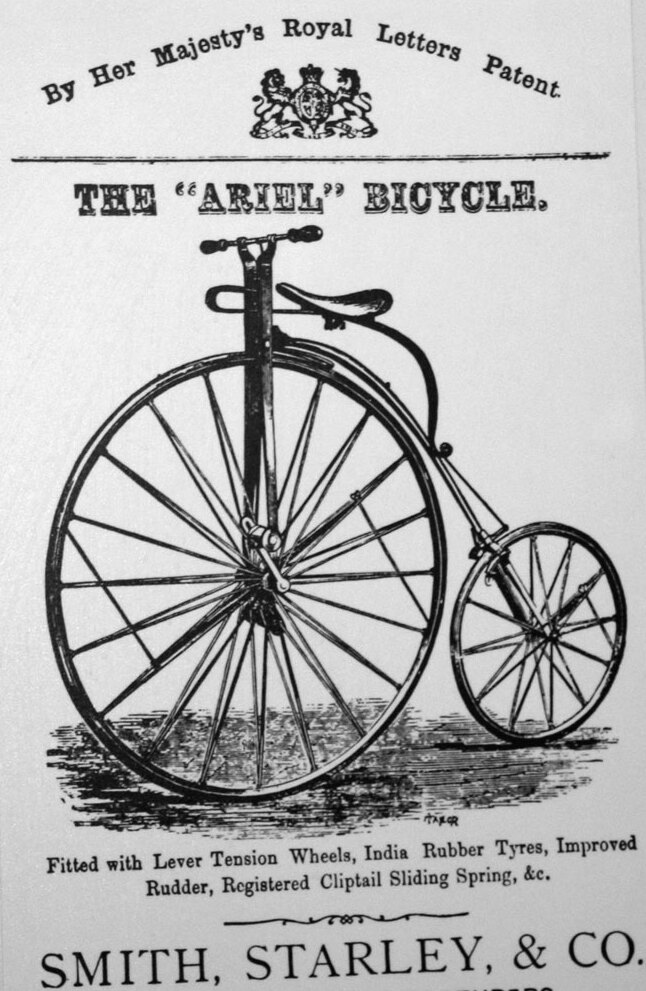
Advertisement for "Ariel" bicycle, c.1873

The Franco-Prussian war brought the French bicycle industry to a halt and mass-production switched to Britain, focused on Coventry, where in 1868 Rowley Turner had placed an order for 300 velocipedes with his uncle's sewing-machine company. (Note: Rowley Turner was at the time a student in Paris, caught up in the velocipede craze. At the 1867 Paris Exhibition he had shown sewing machines produced by the Coventry Sewing Machine Co. Ltd, "for whom he acted as Paris agent" (Bartleet p.28), not "for whom he was the Paris agent", i.e. it was an informal relationship. In a letter which appeared in "Wheeling" 11 March 1891, Rowley Turner wrote "In 1868 I put capital into the velocipede and, with the late M. [Louis] Pascaud, the proprietor of the ... gymnasium in the Rue Vaurigard, and M. Cuissard, established a firm in my name." This is corroborated by the advertisement for "Vélocipèdes Américains de la Maison R.B.Turner et Cie" at "Manège Pascaud, 110 Rue Bonaparte" which appears on p.146 of Herlihy's Bicycle -The History (2004). Finding it impossible to source velocipedes in France, Rowley tried his uncle Josiah. The CSMC's articles did not permit the manufacture of velocipedes, so authorisation was obtained from the shareholders at the AGM on 25 February 1869. In sum, Rowley Turner was not acting as the Paris agent of CSMC, scouting for business. He was acting on behalf of his own company, R.B.Turner et Cie, seeking to place an order with CSMC. Sources: Wheeling 11 March 1891; Herlihy, Bicycle -The History (2004) p.146; Bartleet's Bicycle Book (1931) pp.28,30,Plate 2) James Starley was a foreman at the company and proceeded to make a series of incremental improvements, starting with a mounting step. In 1870 he patented a method to tension simultaneously all the wire spokes in a wheel and then left to found his own business. This mass-produced the all-metal "Ariel" bicycle of 1871, which initially had a 42" front wheel and a 24" rear. Over the next few years, front wheels grew to 60" or more while rear wheels shrank (see James Moore's 1872 bicycle). Ball bearings, solid rubber tires and hollow-section steel frames became standard, reducing weight and improving the ride.

All bicycles pose a risk of "headers" (being precipitated head-first over the front wheel when it comes to a sudden stop, e.g. because it has hit an obstacle). (Note: This editor took one in 1978 when one side of the handlebars broke and fell between the front fork and the front wheel of a modern racing bicycle.) The risk and seriousness of the consequences were much greater with the penny-farthing because the rider was higher and placed almost over the front axle. This was a choice: a larger front wheel and forward riding position provided mechanical advantage, allowing the rider to go faster. That was the attraction of the penny-farthing over the velocipede. Manufacturers of penny-farthings responded to customer demand, producing machines with the seat in various (or variable) positions and with front wheels of varying sizes.

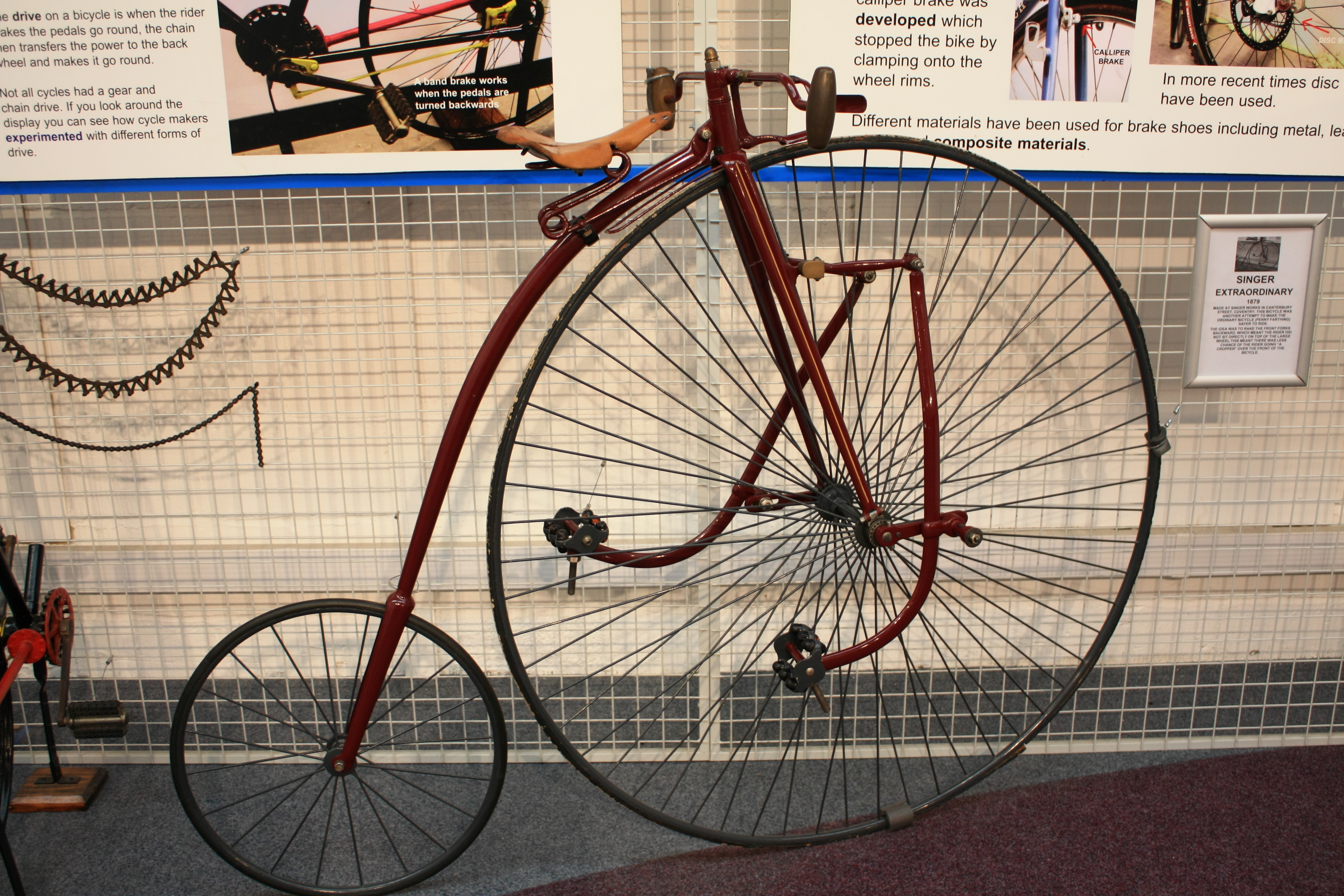
Singer "Xtraordinary", 1879, Coventry Transport Museum, 2009

Some manufacturers adapted the penny-farthing to reduce the risk. In 1878 Ellis & Co. brought out the commercially-successful "Facile", in which the rider sat further back on a relatively small machine, using pedals which drove the front wheel through levers. Also in 1878, Singer & Co. brought out a similar machine, the "Xtraordinary". This included a (patented) feature which maintained the "feel" of the steering and remains in widespread use today: the fork was shaped so the wheel met the ground on the steering axis, despite its rake.

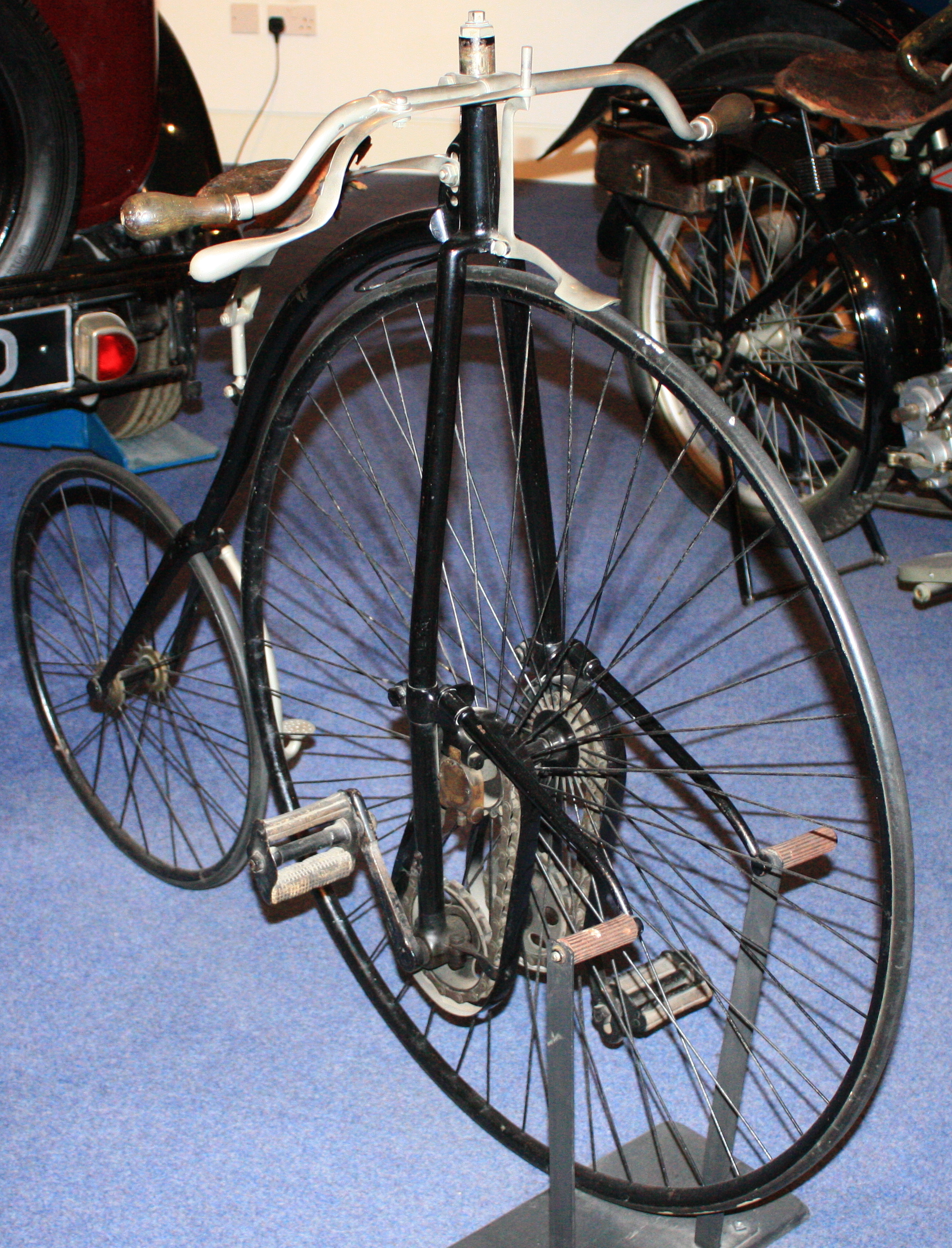
1884 Hillman, Herbert & Cooper "Kangaroo" Safety Bicycle, Coventry Transport Museum, 2009

In 1884 Hillman, Herbert & Cooper introduced the "Kangaroo". in which a chain-drive for each pedal gave a rider the mechanical advantage of a large wheel without its physical size. But by that date, others (e.g. Thomas Humber) were experimenting with chain drive to the rear wheel, separating the steering function (front wheel) from drive (rear wheel). This overcame a problem which only increased as the seat was moved back on a penny-farthing: that the rider's legs had to operate in the plane of the front wheel while the seat lay somewhere between that plane and the plane of the rear wheel.

Although freewheels were patented in several countries in 1869, most bicycles until 1900 were fixed-wheel: the pedals rotated with the wheel when it was turning. This gave the rider the ability to reduce speed by resisting the rotation of the pedals (this was referred to as "back-pedalling", but the term is today more often used for turning the pedals backwards when coasting with a modified freewheel, which applies a brake).

When descending a hill, cyclists took their feet from the pedals, either putting them over the handlebars or on rests provided for them. A separate hand-operated brake operated on the front or back wheel (or both). To save weight, this was omitted from machines for racing, as was the step (a mounting block was used or the rider ran with the bicycle and vaulted on). In his 1887 book, Cycling Viscount Bury gave this advice:

Down hill on a bicycle the safest position is without doubt that in which the legs are placed on the handle-bar, as not only will the sharp application of the brake bring the rider over the front wheel and on to his feet, a somewhat jerky method of dismounting, ... but ... the rider gets at once clear of his machine, and all practical cyclists know that the most painful injuries are caused by the handle-bars striking the front of the legs

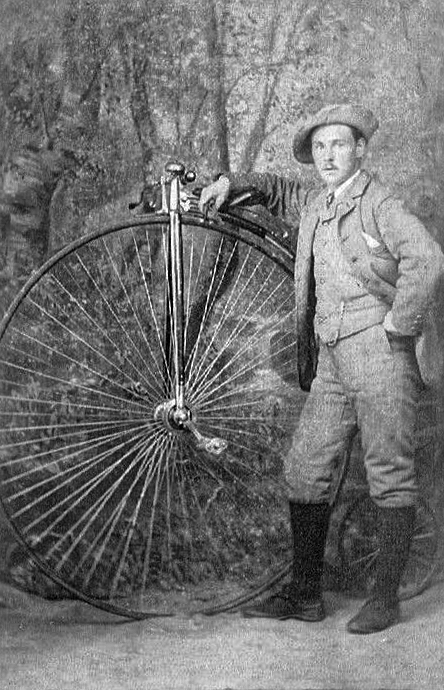
Cabinet card showing a man with his penny-farthing, Fife, Scotland, 1880

Until the 1890s, bicycling remained the province of the well-to-do, mainly men and could be a form of conspicuous consumption.

=== Attributes ===
The penny-farthing used a larger wheel than the velocipede, thus giving higher speeds on all but the hills. In addition, the large wheel gave a smoother ride, important before pneumatic tires.

Penny-farthing bicycles often used similar materials and construction as earlier velocipedes: cast iron frames, solid rubber tires, and plain bearings for pedals, steering, and wheels. They were often quite durable and required little service. For example, when cyclist Thomas Stevens rode around the world in the 1880s, he reported only one significant mechanical problem in over 20,000 kilometres (12,000 miles), caused when the local military confiscated his bicycle and damaged the front wheel.

=== End of an era ===
During the period of its supremacy, the well-known risks of the penny-farthing were outweighed by its strengths. While it was a difficult, dangerous machine, it was simpler, lighter, and faster than the safer velocipedes of the time. Two new developments changed this situation, and led to the adoption of the safety bicycle. The first was the chain drive, originally used on tricycles, which, with a smaller rear sprocket than the chain wheel, allowed a smaller rear wheel to go as far and as fast as a large front wheel. The second (which came after the safety bicycle had been developed) was the pneumatic bicycle tire, which provided a ride as good as that of a penny-farthing with a solid rubber tyre.

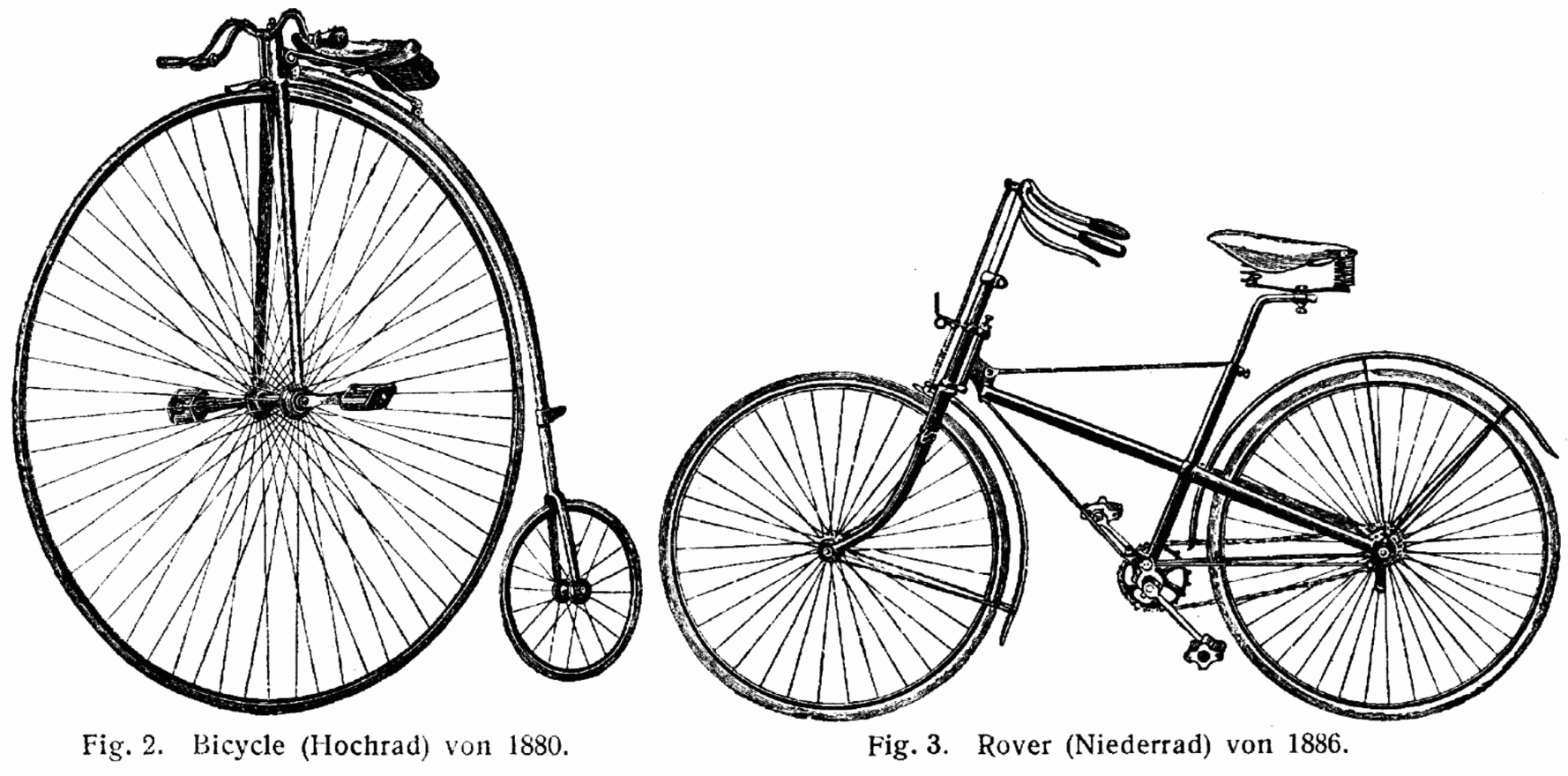
An 1880 penny-farthing (left), and a safety bicycle of 1886 (right)

The nephew of one of the men responsible for popularity of the penny-farthing was largely responsible for its demise. James Starley had built the Ariel (spirit of the air) high-wheeler in 1870, but this was a time of innovation, and when chain drives were upgraded so that each link had a small roller, higher and higher speeds became possible without the need for a large front wheel.

In 1885, Starley's nephew John Kemp Starley took these new developments to launch the modern bicycle, the Rover safety bicycle, so-called because the rider, seated much lower and farther behind the front wheel contact point, was less prone to a header.

In 1888, when John Dunlop re-invented the pneumatic tire for his son's tricycle, the high wheel was made obsolete. The comfortable ride once found only on tall wheels could now be enjoyed on smaller chain-driven bicycles. By 1893, high-wheelers were no longer being produced. Use lingered into the 1920s in track cycling until racing safety bicycles were adequately designed.

=== Modern usage ===
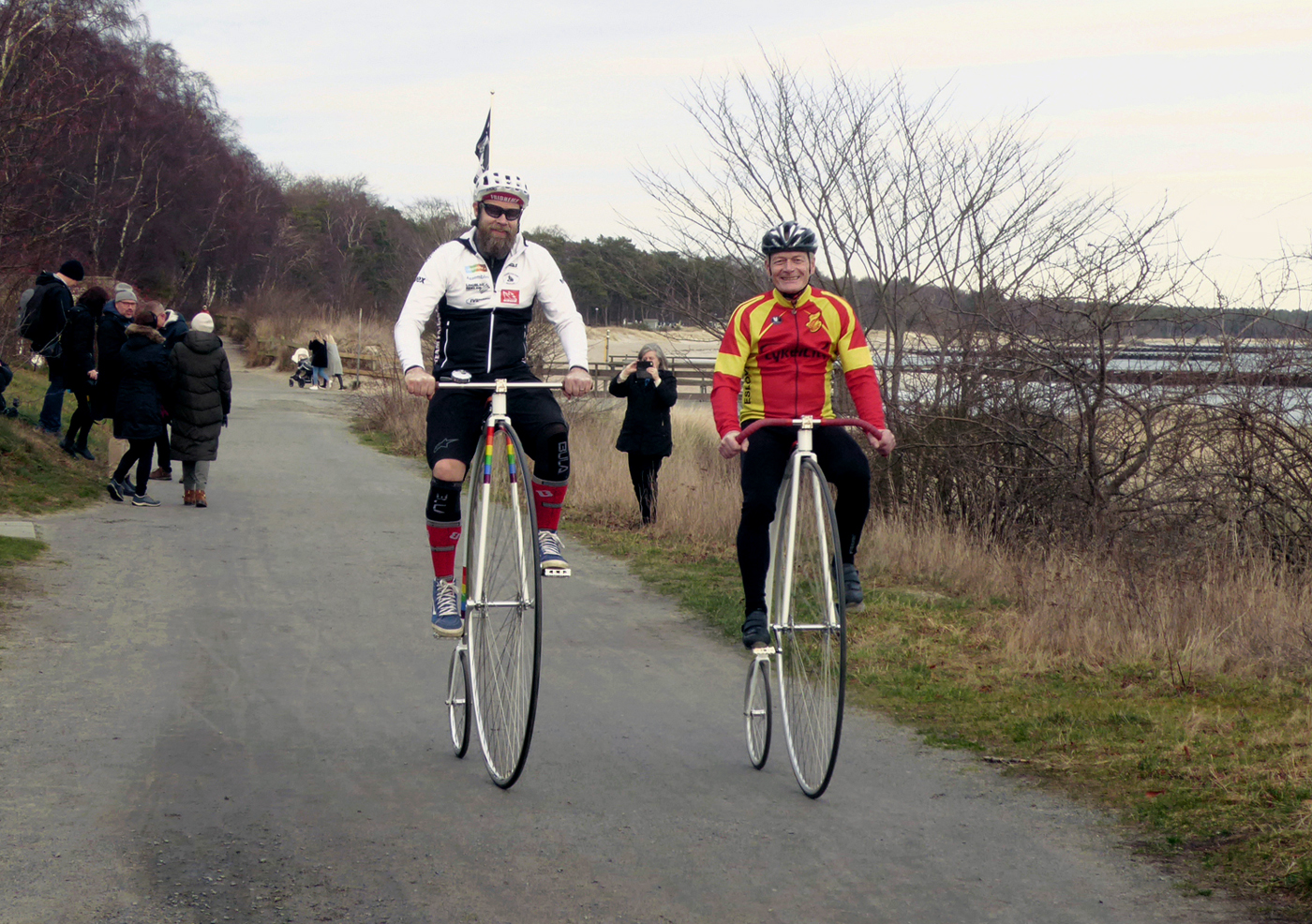
Two highwheel cyclists at a press conference in Ystad ahead of the "Sweden 3 Days Highwheel Race" 2020.

Today, enthusiasts ride restored penny-farthings, and a few manufacturers build new ones with modern materials. Manufacturers include Richards of England (Hull, UK), Rideable Bicycle Replicas (US), Trott & Sons (UK) and UDC (Taiwan). One of these manufacturers, UDC Penny Farthings, the largest penny-farthing retailer in the United Kingdom, recorded record sales of penny-farthings in 2020 during the COVID-19 lockdown.

The Penny Farthing Club is a cycling club that was founded in 2013 by Neil Laughton. The club offers rider training, bike tours of London and other UK cities, and hosts club events such as penny-farthing polo.

== Characteristics ==

The penny-farthing is a direct-drive bicycle, meaning the cranks and pedals are fixed directly to the hub. Instead of using gears to multiply the revolutions of the pedals, the driven wheel is enlarged so the radius from the hub to the outer wheel is comfortable for the rider to reach the pedals fixed to the hub. But the rider needs to be able to both mount the saddle and reach the pedals. If the wheel is too large, this will not be achievable. For instance a 5 feet 9 inches (175 cm) cyclist due to their leg length could at best ride a 50–54 inches (130–140 cm) high wheel depending on the height of the saddle.

=== Construction ===
The frame is a single tube following the circumference of the front wheel, then diverting to a trailing wheel. A mounting peg is above the rear wheel. The front wheel is in a rigid fork with little if any trail. A spoon brake is usually fitted on the fork crown, operated by a lever from one of the handlebars. The bars are usually mustache shaped, dropping from the level of the headset. The saddle mounts on the frame less than 18 inches (46 cm) behind the headset.

One particular model, made by Pope Manufacturing Company in 1886, weighs 36 pounds (16 kg), has a 60-spoke 53-inch (130 cm) front wheel and a 20-spoke 18-inch (46 cm) rear wheel. It is fitted with solid rubber tires. The rims, frame, fork, and handlebars are made from hollow, steel tubing. The steel axles are mounted in adjustable ball bearings. The leather saddle is suspended by springs.

Another model, made by Humber and Co., Ltd., of Beeston, Nottingham, weighs only 24 pounds (11 kg), and has 52-and-18-inch (132 and 46 cm) wheels. It has no step and no brakes, in order to minimize weight.

A third model, also made by Pope Manufacturing Company, weighs 49 pounds (22 kg) and has forged steel forks. A brake lever on the right of a straight handlebar operates a spoon brake against the front wheel.

All three have cranks that can be adjusted for length.

=== Operation ===
It is generally advised to mount a penny-farthing from flat, level ground, since mounting on a slight incline may prevent the cyclist from gaining momentum and possibly result in loss of balance. Similarly, dismounting on an incline is also advised against. Speed moderation, as with all bicycles, is an important safety measure. In particular, taking the feet off the pedals and sudden braking are discouraged due to the increased danger of falling and of being ejected from the vehicle in comparison with a modern bicycle. Changing direction on a penny-farthing also requires caution, due to its more restrictive steering. Generally, riding a penny-farthing is comparable to riding other types of bicycle in respect to anticipating hazards, signalling, and defensive cycling. Penny-farthings remain legal to ride on UK roads.

Operation

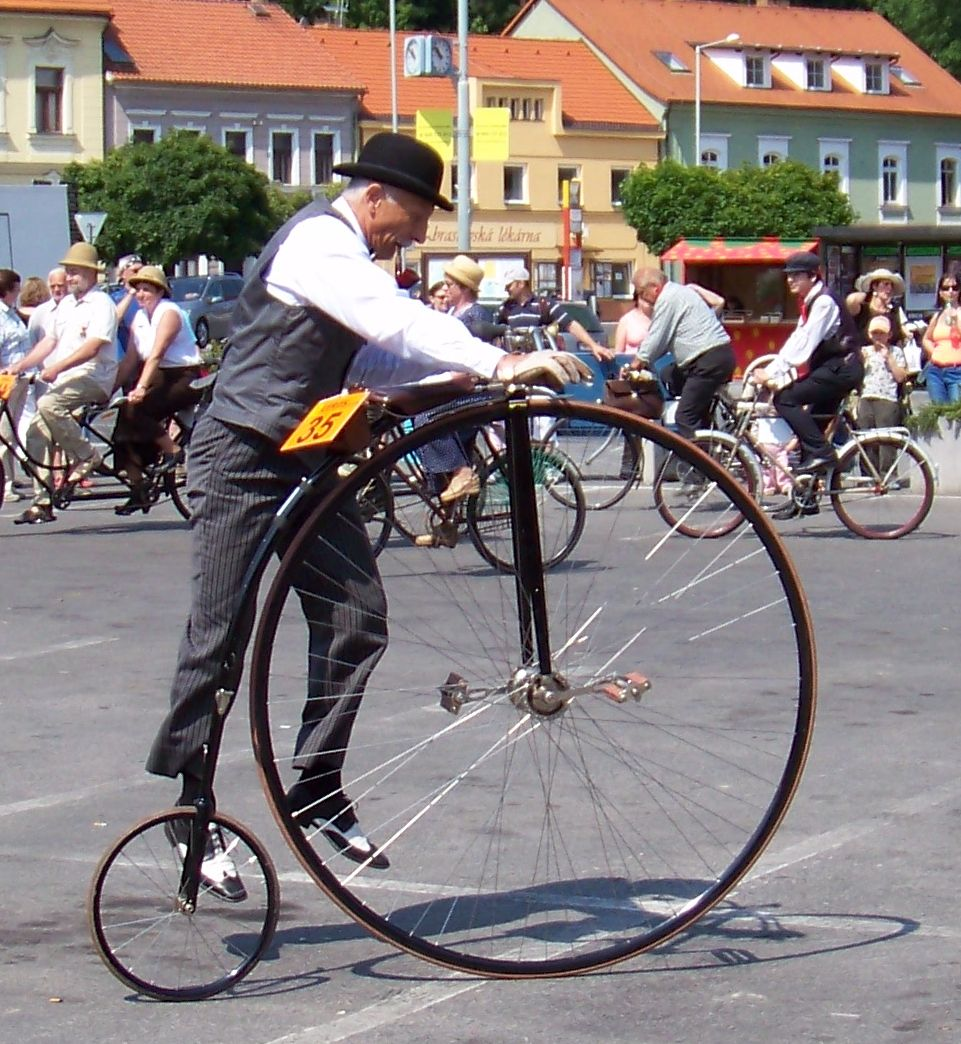
A rider stands on the mounting peg to lift his other leg to a pedal

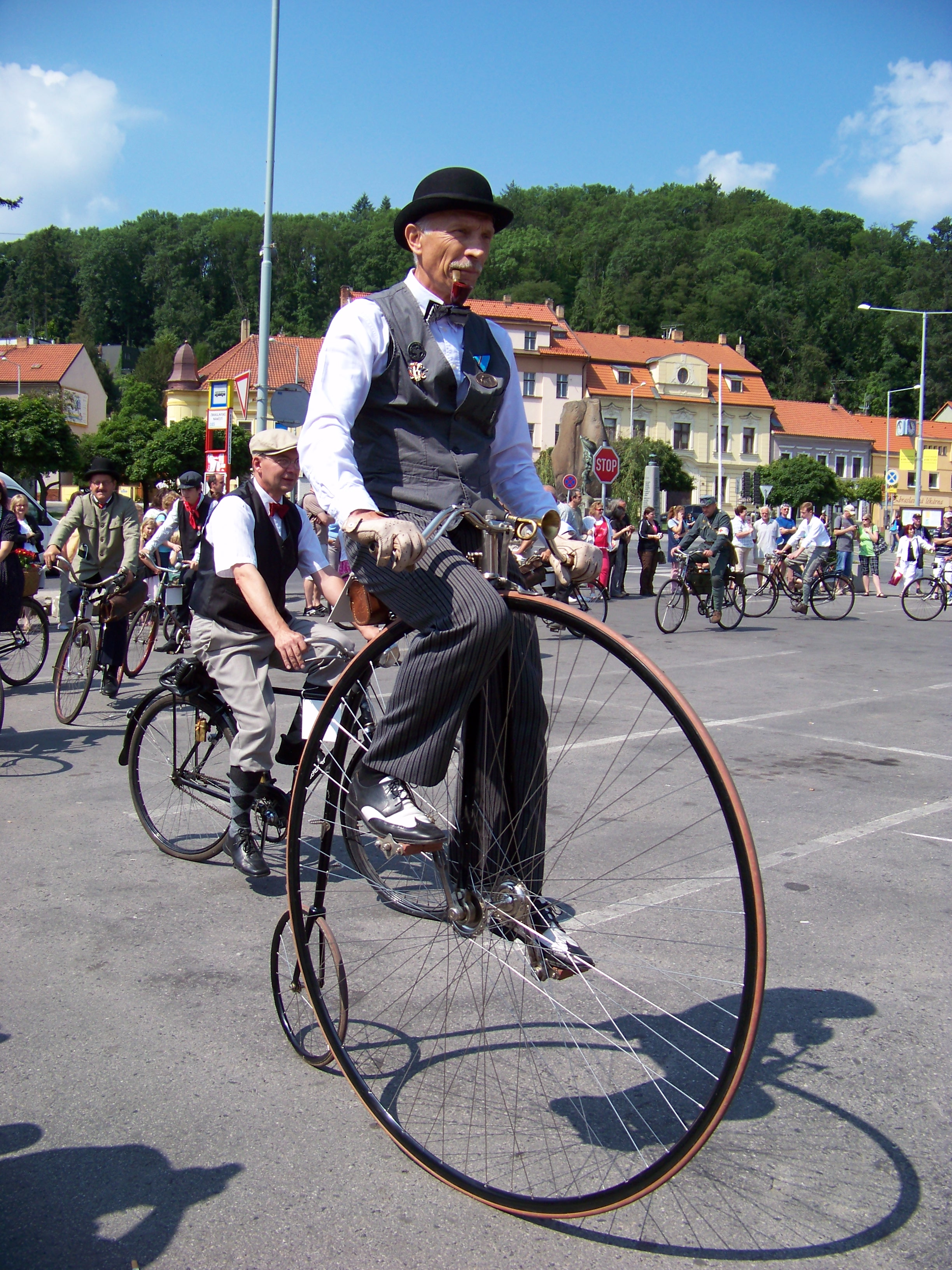
The rider astride the bicycle

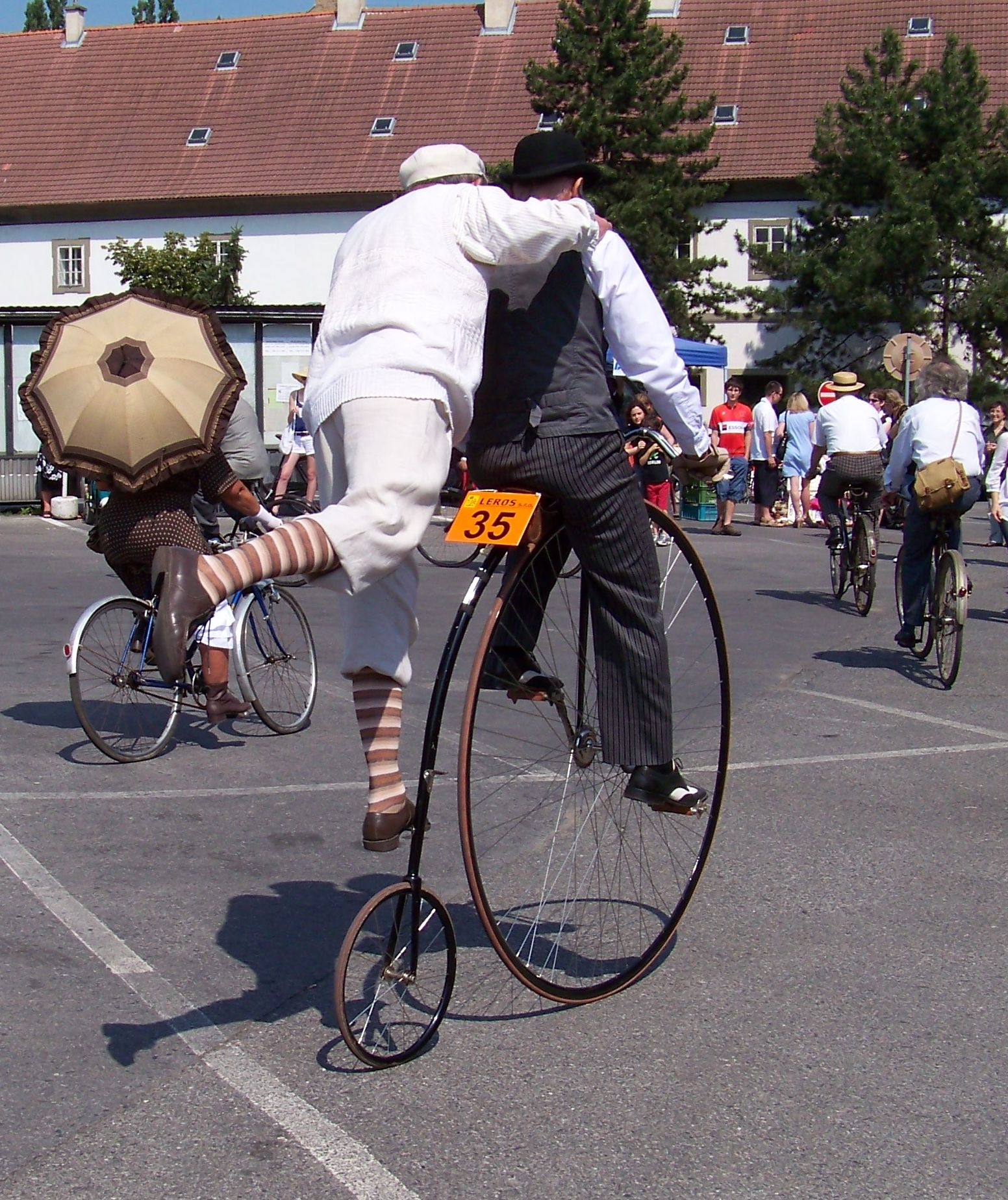
A second person can be carried on the mounting peg

=== Performance ===
Frederick Lindley Dodds, of Stockton-on-Tees, England, is credited with having set the first hour record, covering an estimated distance of 15 miles and 1,480 yards (25.493 kms) on a high-wheeler during a race on the Fenner's Track, Cambridge University on March 25, 1876.

On 27 July 1882 Herbert Cortis became the first man to ride 20 miles in an hour (he covered a further 300 yards in the time). He was more than 6' tall and rode a 62" wheel.

The furthest (paced) hour record ever achieved on a penny-farthing bicycle was 22.09 miles (35.55 km) by William A. Rowe, an American, in 1886.

The record for riding from Land's End to John o' Groats on a penny-farthing was set in 1886 by George Pilkington Mills with a time of five days, one hour, and 45 minutes. This record was broken in 2019 by Richard Thoday with a time of four days, 11 hours and 52 minutes.

Until the 21st century, the last paced hour record to be set on a penny-farthing was probably BW Attlee's 1891 English amateur record of 21.10 miles (33.96 km). This was beaten by Scots cyclist Mark Beaumont at Herne Hill Velodrome on 16 June 2018 when he covered 21.92 miles (35.28 km).

In 1884, Thomas Stevens rode (and walked) a Columbia penny-farthing in 103 days from San Francisco to Boston—the first cyclist to cross the United States. In 1885–86, he continued from London through Europe, the Middle East, China, and Japan, to become the first to ride around the world.

Tremendous feats of balance were reported, including riding across the parapet of the Cabin John Bridge and riding down the U.S. Capitol steps with the American Star Bicycle which has the small wheel in front.

== In popular culture ==
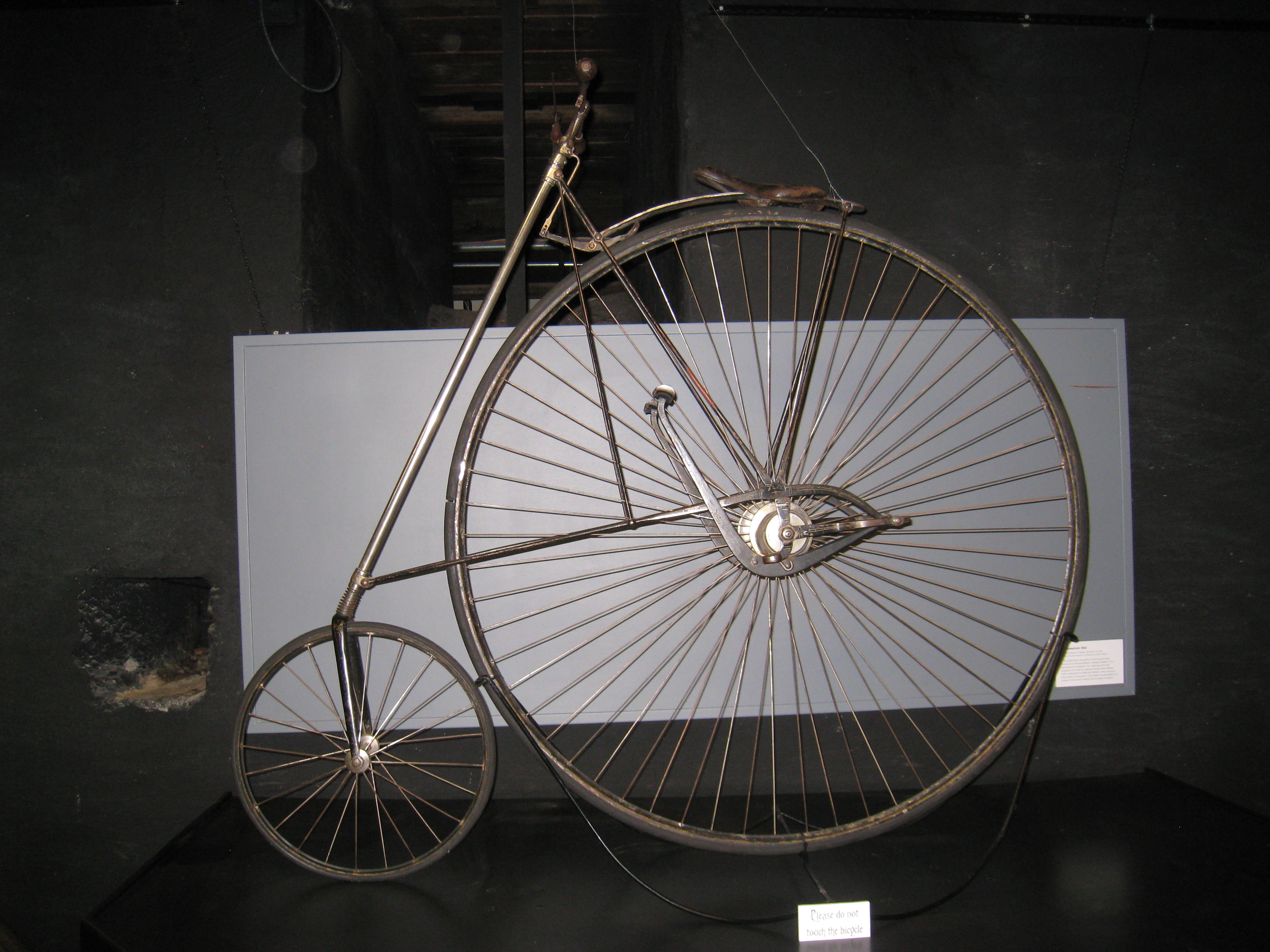
An American Star Bicycle from 1885 with the small wheel in front

The bike, with the one wheel dominating, led to riders being referred to in America as "wheelmen", a name that lived on for nearly a century in the League of American Wheelmen until renamed the League of American Bicyclists in 1994. Clubs of racing cyclists wore uniforms of peaked caps, tight jackets and knee-length breeches, with leather shoes, the caps and jackets displaying the club's colors. In 1967 collectors and restorers of penny-farthings (and other early bicycles) founded the Wheelmen, a non-profit organization "dedicated to keeping alive the heritage of American cycling".

The high-wheeler lives on in the gear inch units used by cyclists in English-speaking countries to describe gear ratios. These are calculated by multiplying the wheel diameter in inches by the number of teeth on the front chain-wheel and dividing by the teeth on the rear sprocket. The result is the equivalent diameter of a penny-farthing wheel. A 60-inch gear, the largest practicable size for a high-wheeler, is nowadays a middle gear of a utility bicycle, while top gears on many exceed 100 inches. There was at least one 64-inch (1.6 m) Columbia made in the mid-1880s, but 60 was the largest in regular production.

A penny-farthing is the logo of The Village in the cult 1960s television series The Prisoner, and is also featured in the show's closing titles. Co-creator and star Patrick McGoohan stated that the bike represented slowing down the wheels of progress.

The penny-farthing is a symbol of the cities of Sparta, Wisconsin; Davis, California; and Redmond, Washington.

== Events ==
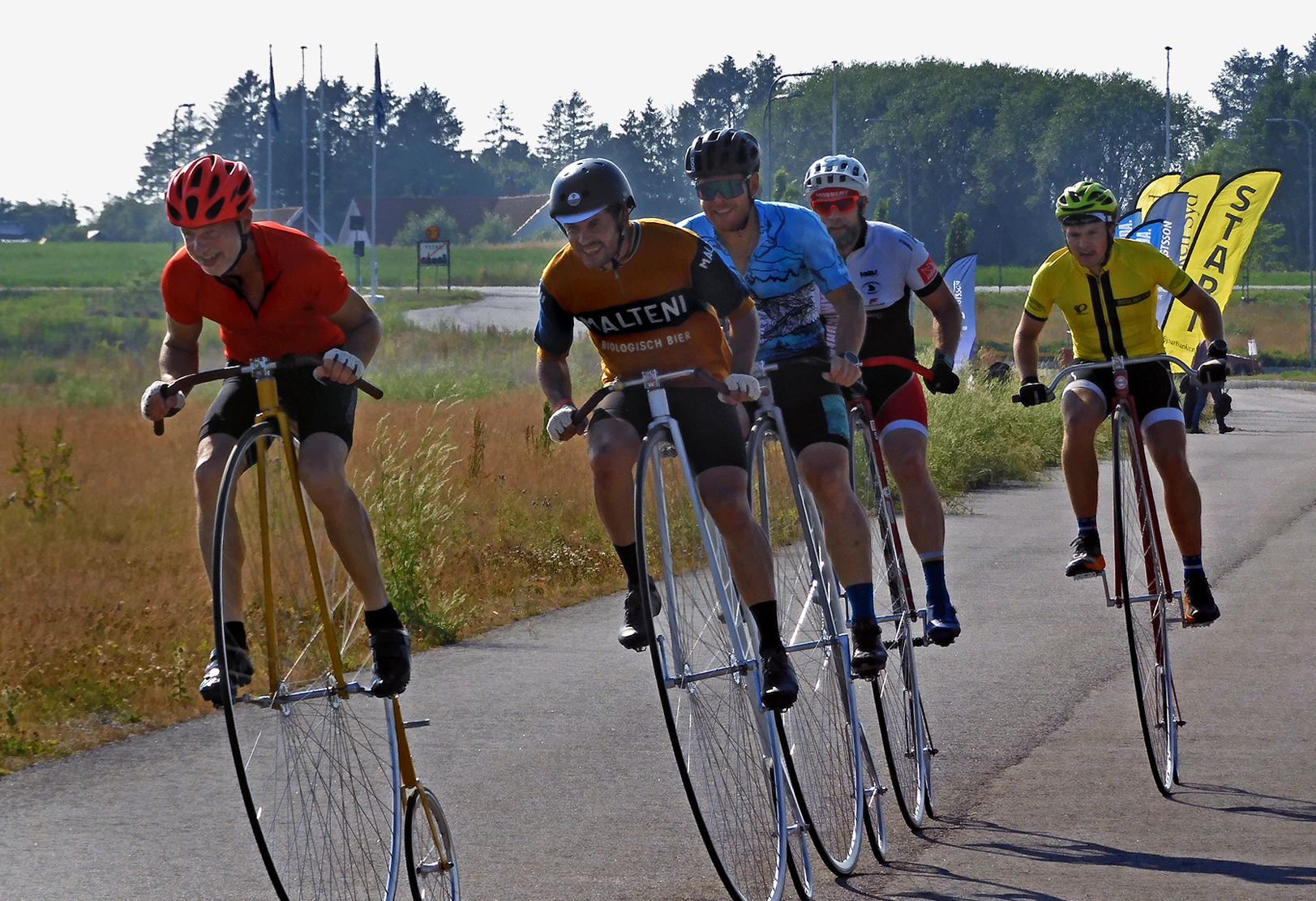
High wheel race 2021

- Each February in Evandale, Tasmania, penny-farthing enthusiasts from around the world converge on the small village for a series of penny-farthing races, including the national championship.
- In October there is a bicycle ride from the 30 feet (9.1 m) statue of an 1890s bicyclist on a penny-farthing in Port Byron, Illinois, named "Will B. Rolling" to a similar statue in Sparta, Wisconsin named "Ben Bikin'".
- In 2004, British leukemia patient and charity fundraiser Lloyd Scott (43) rode a penny-farthing across the Australian outback to raise money for a charitable cause.
- In November 2008, Briton Joff Summerfield completed a 22,000 miles (35,000 km) round-the-world trip on a penny-farthing. Summerfield spent two-and-a-half years cycling through 23 countries, visiting locations including the Taj Mahal, Angkor Wat and Mount Everest.
- Knutsford in England has hosted the Knutsford Great Race every 10 years since 1980. The 1980 race had 15 team entries, and there were 16 in 1990 and 2000. The 2010 race was limited to 50 teams and was in aid of the ShelterBox charity.
- In 2012, the first Clustered Spires High Wheel Race took place in Frederick, Maryland. This is the country's only race of its kind—a one-hour criterium race around a 0.4 miles (644 m) course through the historic downtown district.

== See also ==
- Big Wheel, a tricycle
- High wheeler, an automobile
- Outline of cycling
- Monowheel, a single-wheeled vehicle
- Tall bike, an unusually tall bicycle
- Unicycle, a single-wheeled vehicle
- Velocipede, a predecessor
- Yike Bike, an electric "mini-farthing" design
