= Motorcycle =

Two- or three-wheeled motor vehicle

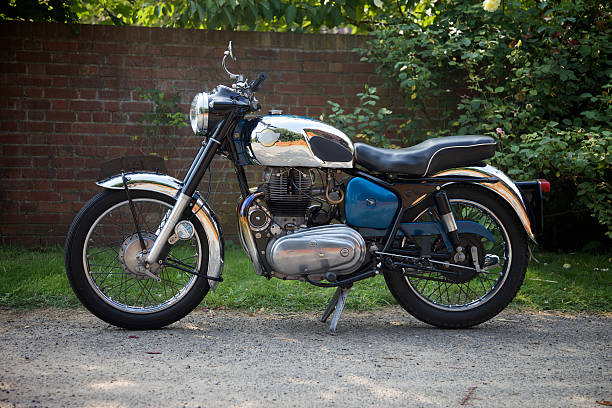
- Royal Enfield meteor minor
- Classification: Vehicle
- Application: Transportation
- Fuel source: Gasoline (most common); Electric battery; Diesel fuel
- Powered: Yes
- Self-propelled: Yes
- Wheels: 2 (rarely 3 or 4)
- Inventor: Gottlieb Daimler
- Invented: 1885

A motorcycle (motorbike, bike, or, if three-wheeled, a trike) is a two or three-wheeled motor vehicle steered by a handlebar from a saddle-style seat.

Motorcycle designs vary greatly to suit a range of different purposes: long-distance travel, commuting, cruising, sport (including racing), and off-road riding. Motorcycling is riding a motorcycle and being involved in other related social activities such as joining a motorcycle club and attending motorcycle rallies.

The 1885 Daimler Reitwagen made by Gottlieb Daimler and Wilhelm Maybach in Germany was the first internal combustion petroleum-fueled motorcycle. In 1894, Hildebrand & Wolfmüller became the first series production motorcycle.

Globally, motorcycles are comparable numerically to cars as a method of transport: in 2021, approximately 58.6 million new motorcycles were sold around the world, while 66.7 million cars were sold over the same period.

In 2022, the top four motorcycle producers by volume and type were Honda, Yamaha, Kawasaki, and Suzuki. According to the US Department of Transportation, per 100 million Vehicle Miles Travelled in 2024 in the U.S., the fatality rate for motorcyclists (28.00) was almost 27 times the passenger car occupant fatality rate (1.05) and over 44 times the fatality rate for light-truck occupants (0.63). The motorcyclist injury rate (391) was nearly 5 times the injury rate of passenger car occupants (86) and over 7 times the injury rate of light-truck occupants (54).

== Types ==
The term motorcycle has different legal definitions depending on jurisdiction (see § Legal definitions and restrictions).

There are three major types of motorcycle: street, off-road, and dual purpose. Within these types, there are many sub-types of motorcycles for different purposes. There is often a racing counterpart to each type, such as road racing and street bikes, or motocross including dirt bikes.

Street bikes include cruisers, sportbikes, scooters and mopeds, and many other types. Off-road motorcycles include many types designed for dirt-oriented racing classes such as motocross and are not street legal in most areas. Dual purpose machines like the dual-sport style are made to go off-road but include features to make them legal and comfortable on the street as well.

Each configuration offers either specialised advantage or broad capability, and each design creates a different riding posture.

In some countries the use of pillions (rear seats) is restricted.

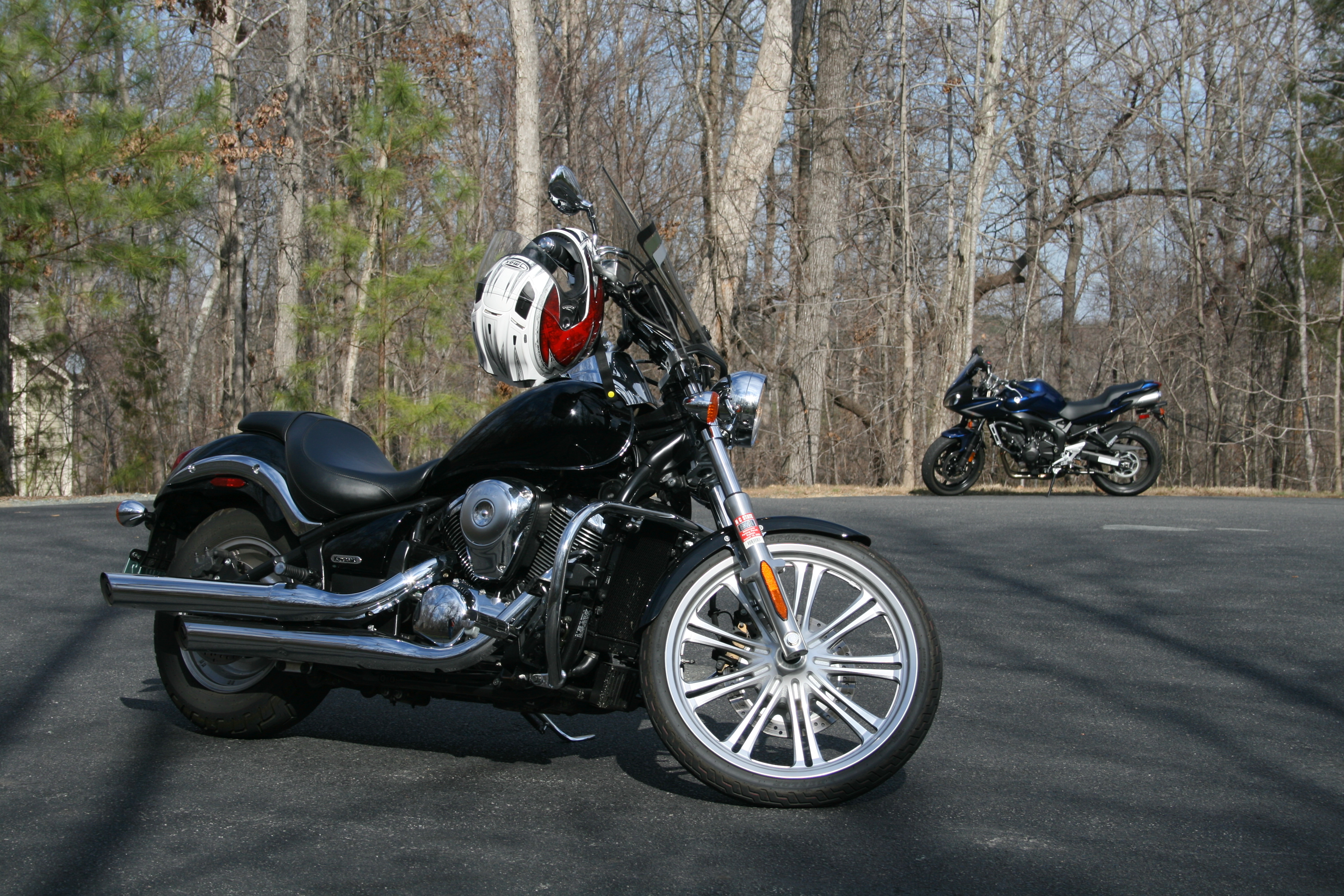
A cruiser (front) and a sportbike (background)

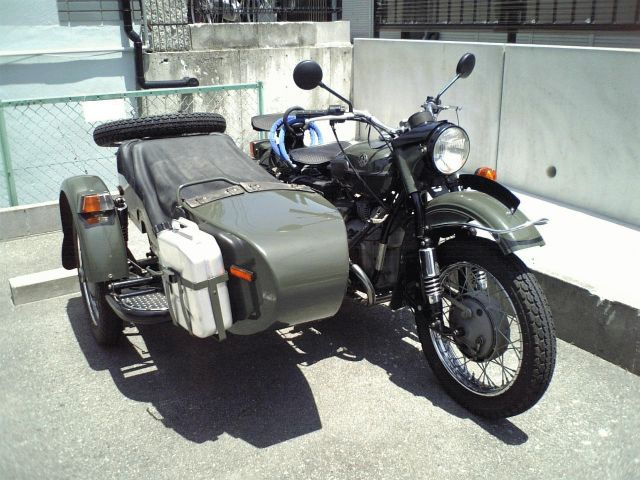
A Ural motorcycle with a sidecar

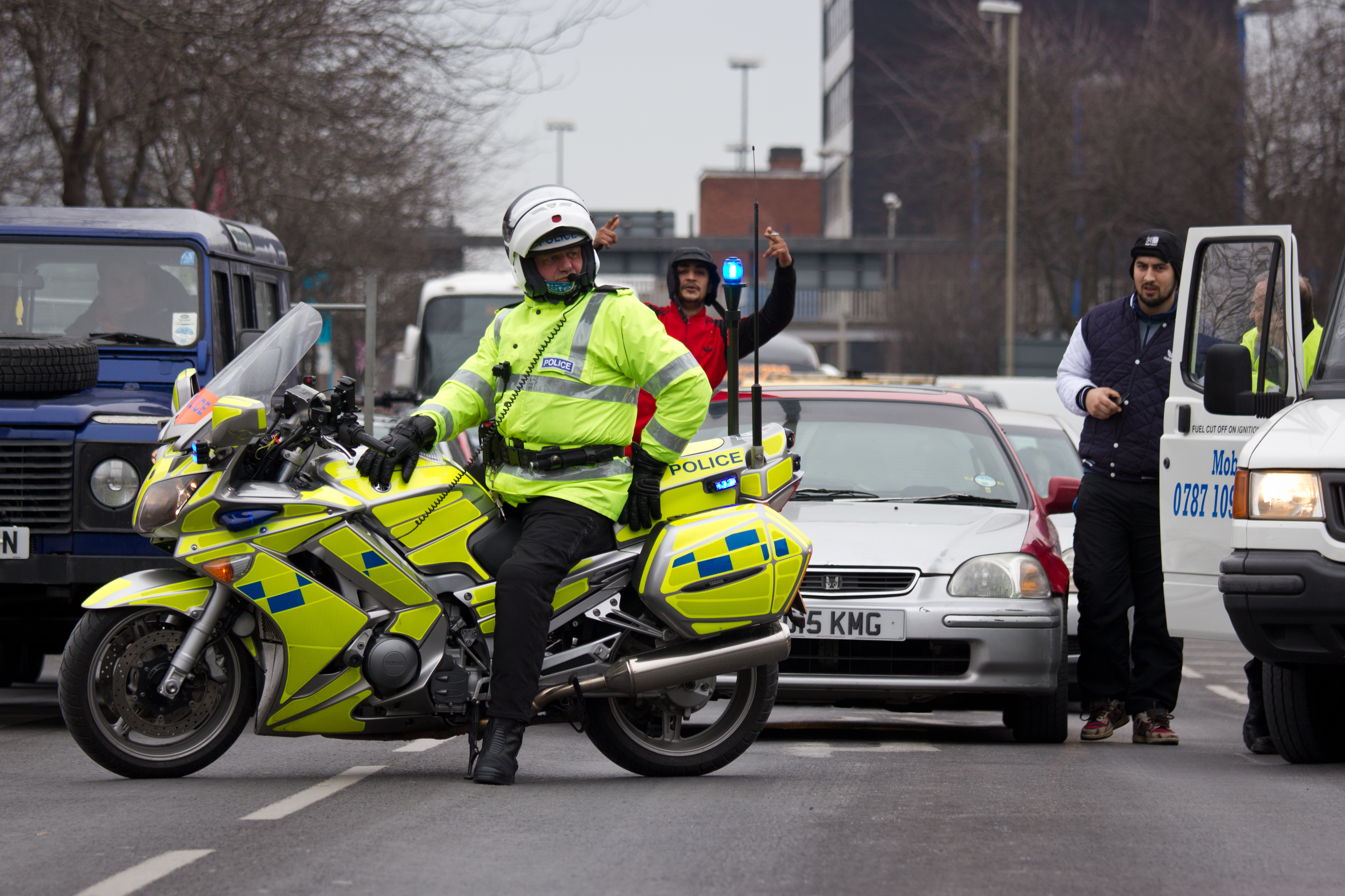
A British police motorcycle

== History ==
=== Experimentation and invention ===
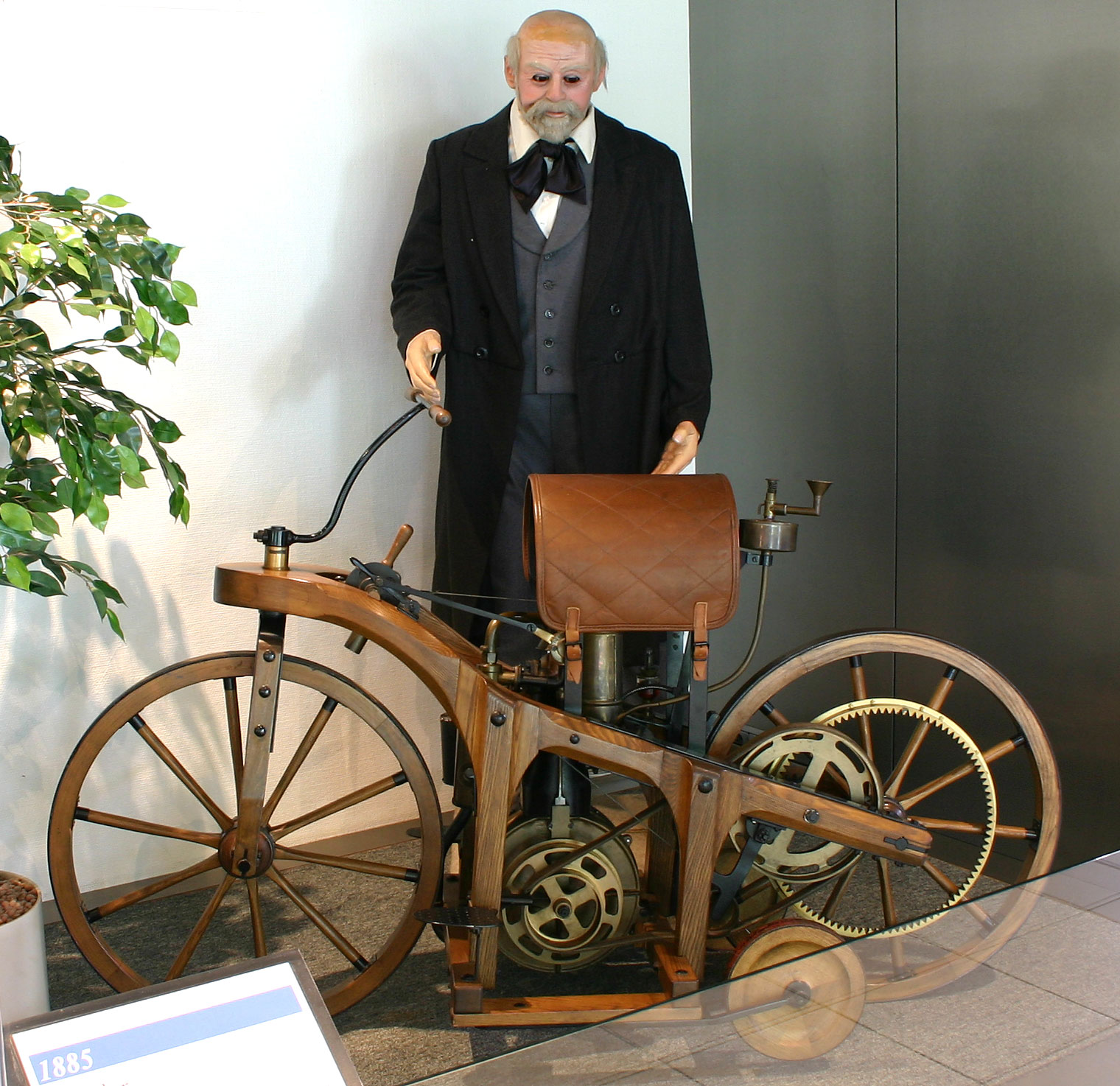
Replica of the Daimler-Maybach Reitwagen

The first internal combustion, petroleum fueled motorcycle was the Daimler Reitwagen. It was designed and built by the German inventors Gottlieb Daimler and Wilhelm Maybach in Bad Cannstatt, Germany, in 1885. This vehicle was unlike either the safety bicycles or the boneshaker bicycles of the era in that it had zero degrees of steering axis angle and no fork offset, and thus did not use the principles of bicycle and motorcycle dynamics developed nearly 70 years earlier. Instead, it relied on two outrigger wheels to remain upright while turning.

The inventors called their invention the Reitwagen ("riding car"). It was designed as an expedient testbed for their new engine, rather than a true prototype vehicle.

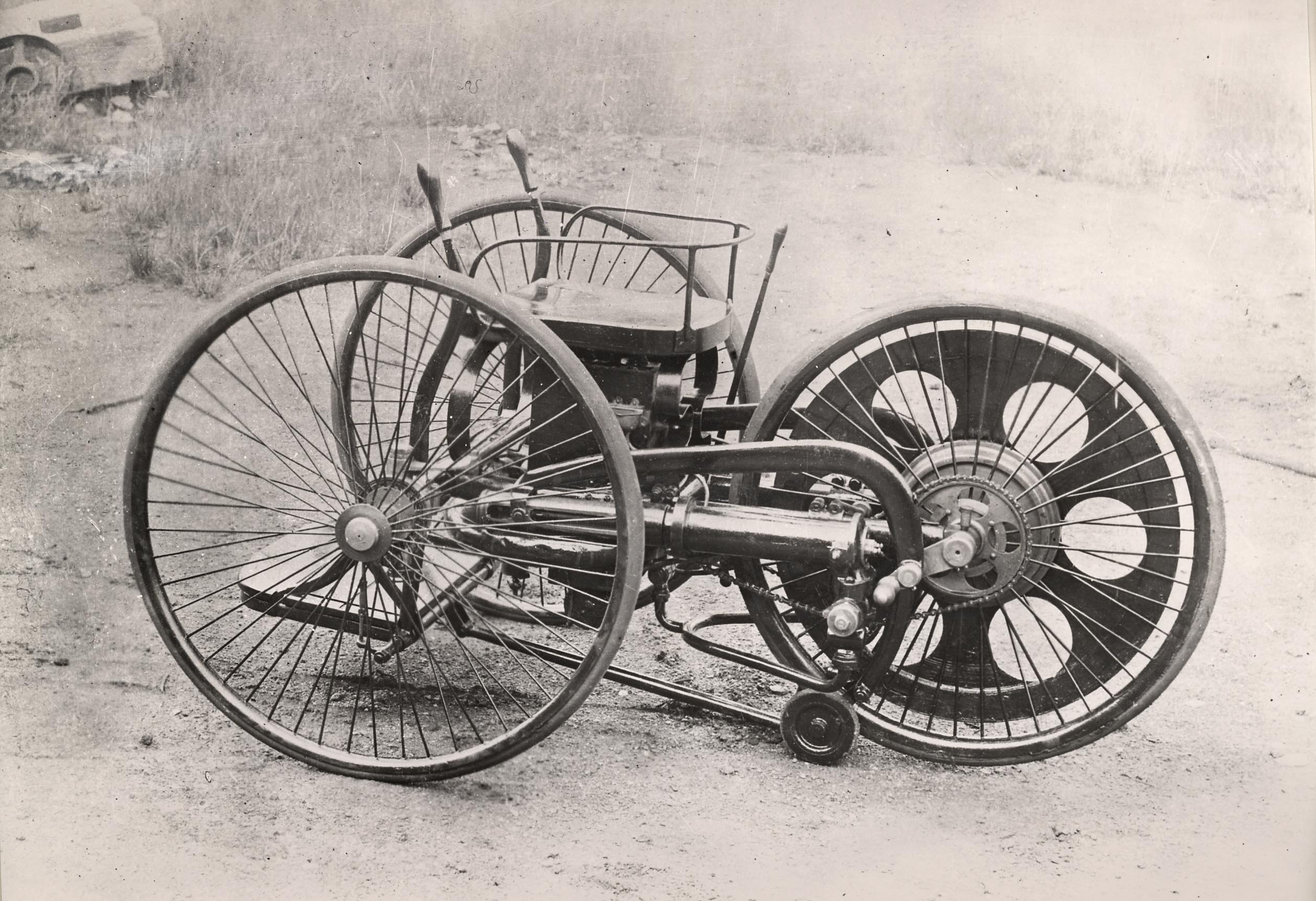
Butler's Patent Velocycle

The first commercial design for a self-propelled cycle was a three-wheel design called the Butler Petrol Cycle, conceived of Edward Butler in England in 1884. He exhibited his plans for the vehicle at the Stanley Cycle Show in London in 1884. The vehicle was built by the Merryweather Fire Engine company in Greenwich, in 1888.

The Butler Petrol Cycle was a three-wheeled vehicle, with the rear wheel directly driven by a 5/8 hp (0.47 kW), 40 cc (2.4 cu in) displacement, 2 1/4 in × 5 in (57 mm × 127 mm) bore × stroke, flat twin four-stroke engine (with magneto ignition replaced by coil and battery) equipped with rotary valves and a float-fed carburettor (five years before Maybach) and Ackermann steering, all of which were state of the art at the time. Starting was by compressed air. The engine was liquid-cooled, with a radiator over the rear driving wheel. Speed was controlled by means of a throttle valve lever. No braking system was fitted; the vehicle was stopped by raising and lowering the rear driving wheel using a foot-operated lever; the weight of the machine was then borne by two small castor wheels. The driver was seated between the front wheels. It was not, however, a success, as Butler failed to find sufficient financial backing.

Many authorities have excluded steam powered, electric motorcycles or diesel-powered two-wheelers from the definition of a 'motorcycle', and credit the Daimler Reitwagen as the world's first motorcycle. Given the rapid rise in use of electric motorcycles worldwide, defining only internal-combustion powered two-wheelers as 'motorcycles' is increasingly problematic. The first (petroleum fueled) internal-combustion motorcycles, like the German Reitwagenwere, however, also the first practical motorcycles.

If a two-wheeled vehicle with steam propulsion is considered a motorcycle, then the first motorcycles built seem to be the French Michaux-Perreaux steam velocipede which patent application was filed in December 1868, constructed around the same time as the American Roper steam velocipede, built by Sylvester H. Roper of Roxbury, Massachusetts, who had been demonstrating his machine at fairs and circuses in the eastern U.S. since 1867. Roper built about 10 steam cars and cycles from the 1860s until his death in 1896.

==== Summary of early inventions ====
| Year | Vehicle | Number of wheels | Inventor | Engine type | Notes |
|---|---|---|---|---|---|
| 1867–1868 | Michaux-Perreaux steam velocipede | 2 | Pierre Michaux; Louis-Guillaume Perreaux | Steam | One made |
| 1867–1868 | Roper steam velocipede | 2 | Sylvester Roper | Steam | One made |
| 1885 | Daimler Reitwagen | 2 (plus 2 outriggers) | Gottlieb Daimler; Wilhelm Maybach | Petroleum internal-combustion | One made |
| 1887 | Butler Petrol Cycle | 3 (plus 2 castors) | Edward Butler | Petroleum internal-combustion | |
| 1894 | Hildebrand & Wolfmüller | 2 | Heinrich Hildebrand; Wilhelm Hildebrand; Alois Wolfmüller | Petroleum internal-combustion | Modern configuration; First mass-produced motorcycle; First machine to be called "motorcycle" |

=== First motorcycle companies ===
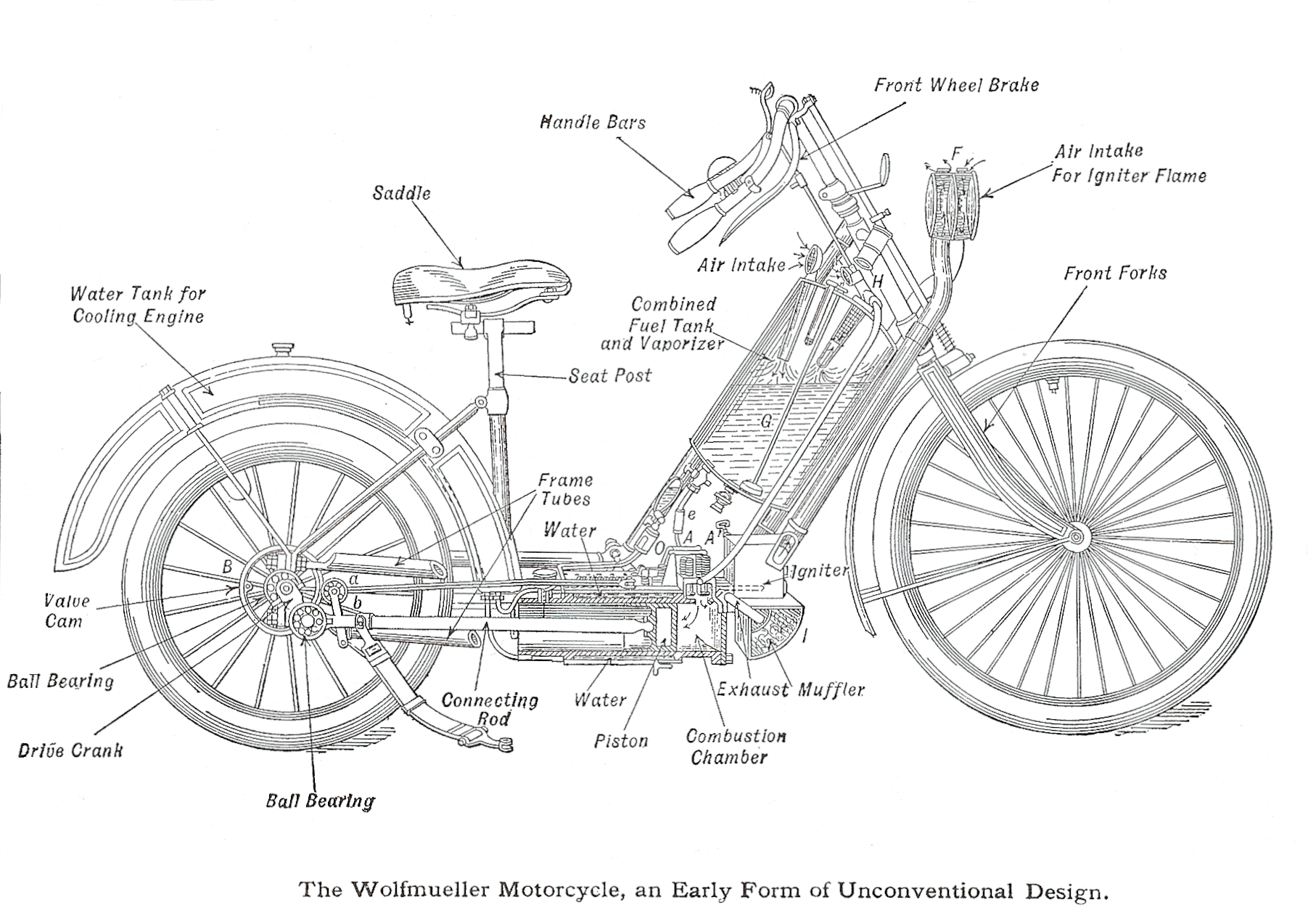
Diagram of 1894 Hildebrand & Wolfmüller

In 1894, Hildebrand & Wolfmüller became the first series production motorcycle, and the first to be called a motorcycle (German: Motorrad). Excelsior Motor Company, originally a bicycle manufacturing company based in Coventry, England, began production of their first motorcycle model in 1896.

The first production motorcycle in the US was the Orient-Aster, built by Charles Metz in 1898 at his factory in Waltham, Massachusetts.

In the early period of motorcycle history, many producers of bicycles adapted their designs to accommodate the new internal combustion engine. As the engines became more powerful and designs outgrew the bicycle origins, the number of motorcycle producers increased. Many of the nineteenth-century inventors who worked on early motorcycles often moved on to other inventions. Daimler and Roper, for example, both went on to develop automobiles.

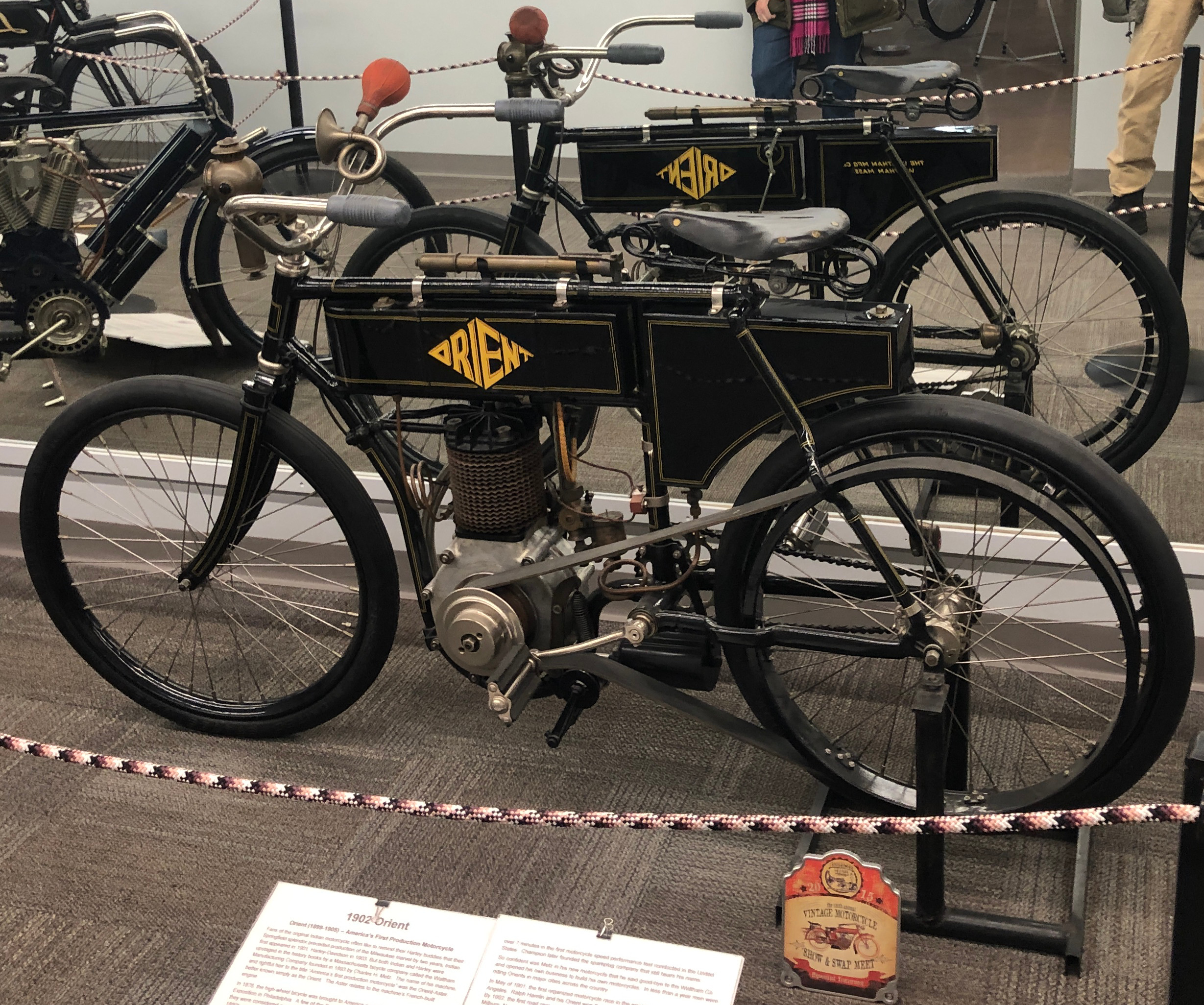
1902 Orient motocycle

At the end of the 19th century the first major mass-production firms were set up. In 1898, Triumph Motorcycles in England began producing motorbikes, and by 1903 it was producing over 500 bikes. Other British firms were Royal Enfield, Norton, Douglas Motorcycles and Birmingham Small Arms Company who began motorbike production in 1899, 1902, 1907 and 1910, respectively. Indian began production in 1901 and Harley-Davidson was established two years later. By the outbreak of World War I, the largest motorcycle manufacturer in the world was Indian, producing over 20,000 bikes per year.

=== First World War ===
During the First World War, motorbike production was greatly ramped up for the war effort to supply effective communications with front line troops. Messengers on horses were replaced with despatch riders on motorcycles carrying messages, performing reconnaissance and acting as a military police. American company Harley-Davidson was devoting over 50% of its factory output toward military contract by the end of the war. The British company Triumph Motorcycles sold more than 30,000 of its Triumph Type H model to allied forces during the war. With the rear wheel driven by a belt, the Model H was fitted with a 499 cc (30.5 cu in) air-cooled four-stroke single-cylinder engine. It was also the first Triumph without pedals.

The Model H in particular, is regarded by many as having been the first "modern motorcycle". Introduced in 1915 it had a 550 cc side-valve four-stroke engine with a three-speed gearbox and belt transmission. It was so popular with its users that it was nicknamed the "Trusty Triumph".

=== Postwar ===
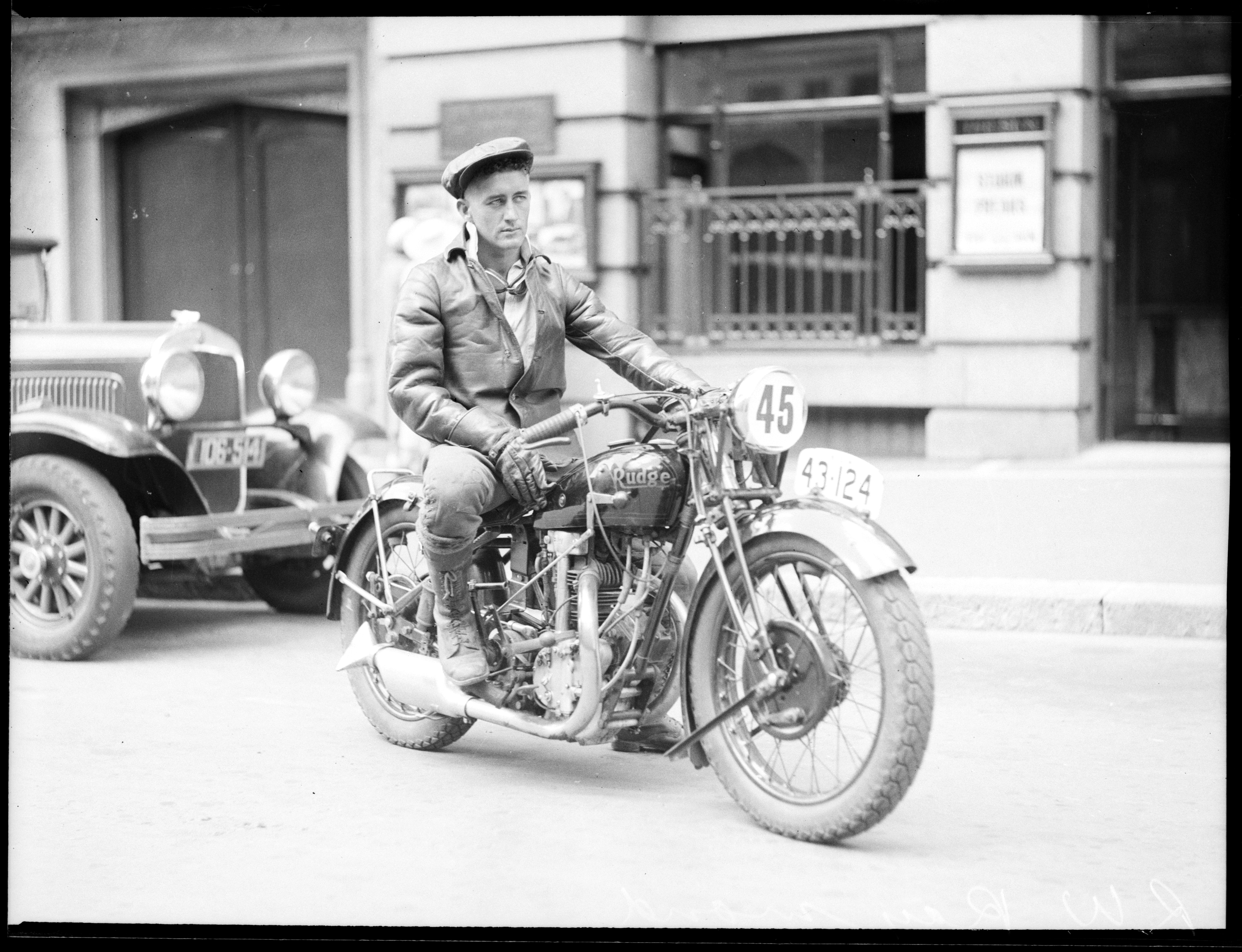
Motorcycle rider on his Rudge-Whitworth motorbike, Australia, c. 1935

By 1920, Harley-Davidson was the largest manufacturer, with their motorcycles being sold by dealers in 67 countries.

Amongst many British motorcycle manufacturers, Chater-Lea with its twin-cylinder models followed by its large singles in the 1920s stood out. Initially, using a converted Woodmann-designed OHV Blackburne engine, it became the first 350 cc to exceed 100 mph (160 km/h), recording 100.81 mph (162.24 km/h) over the flying kilometre during April 1924. Later, Chater-Lea set a world record for the flying kilometre for 350 cc and 500 cc motorcycles at 102.9 mph (165.6 km/h) for the firm. Chater-Lea produced variants of these world-beating sports models and became popular among racers at the Isle of Man TT.

By the late 1920s or early 1930s, DKW in Germany took over as the largest manufacturer.

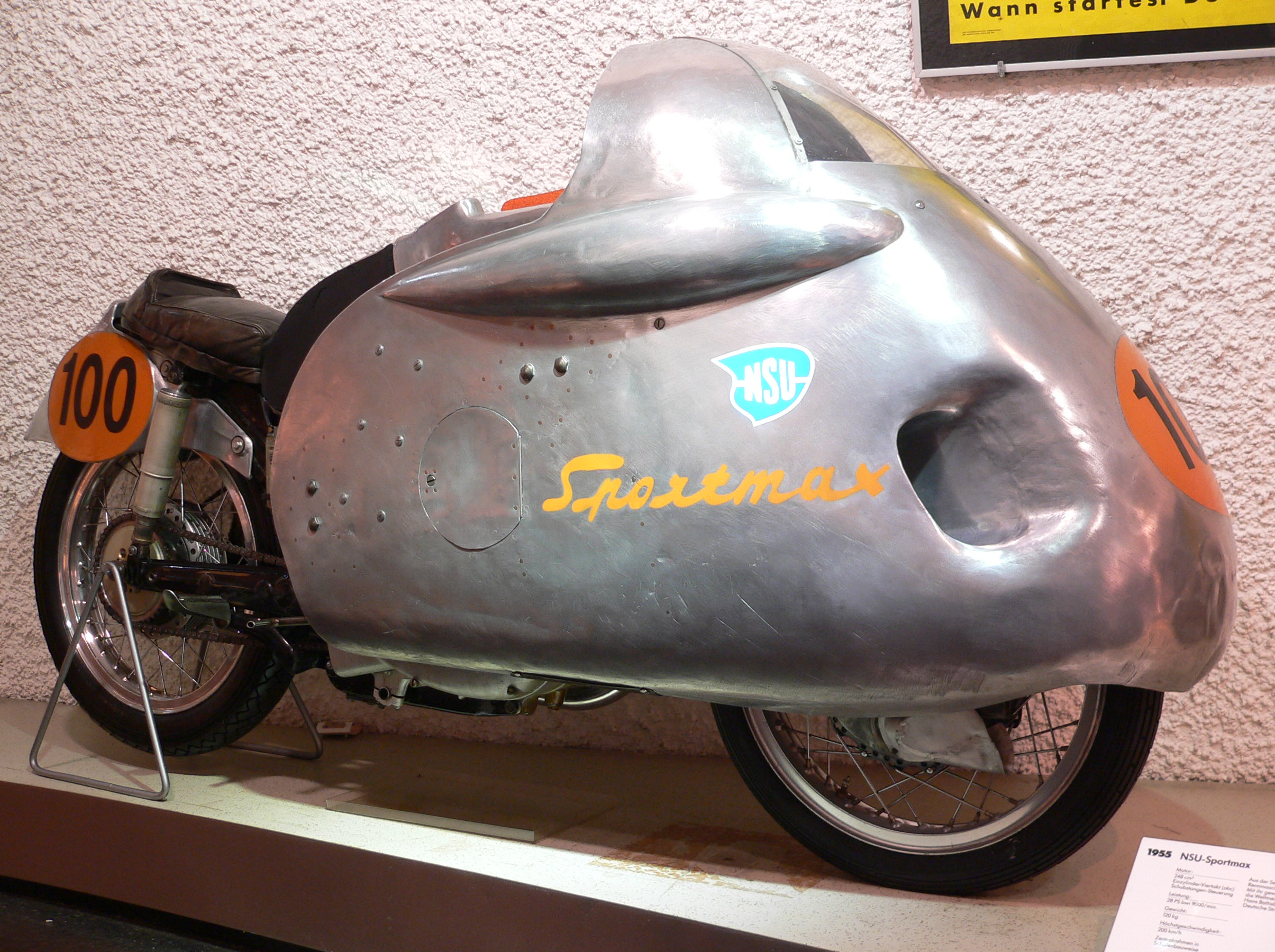
NSU Sportmax streamlined motorcycle, 250 cc class winner of the 1955 Grand Prix season

In the 1950s, streamlining began to play an increasing part in the development of racing motorcycles and the "dustbin fairing" held out the possibility of radical changes to motorcycle design. NSU and Moto Guzzi were in the vanguard of this development, both producing very radical designs well ahead of their time. NSU produced the most advanced design, but after the deaths of four NSU riders in the 1954–1956 seasons, they abandoned further development and quit Grand Prix motorcycle racing.

Moto Guzzi produced competitive race machines, and until the end of 1957 had a succession of victories. The following year, 1958, full enclosure fairings were banned from racing by the FIM in the light of the safety concerns.

From the 1960s through the 1990s, small two-stroke motorcycles were popular worldwide, partly as a result of East German MZs Walter Kaaden's engine work in the 1950s.

=== Today ===
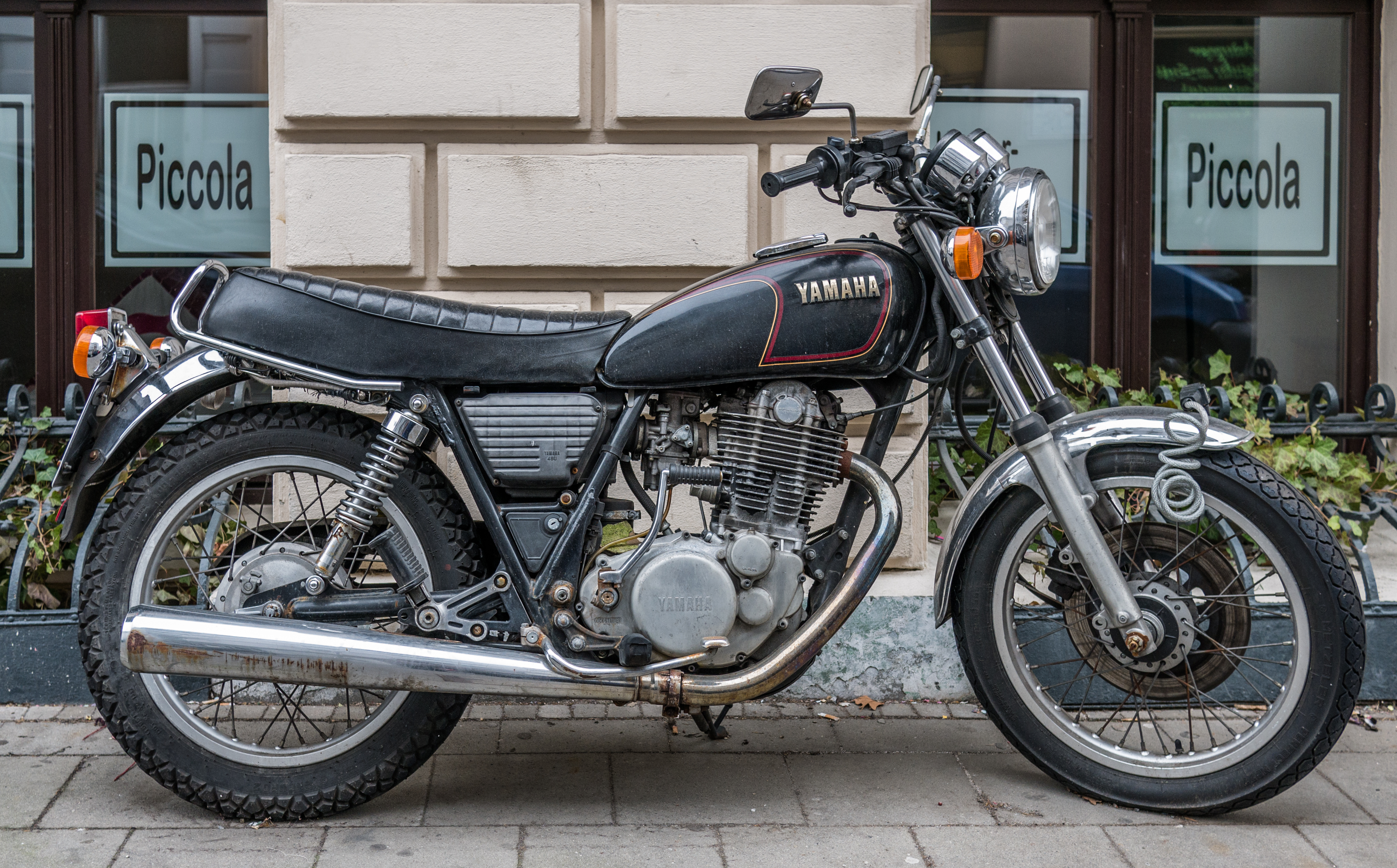
Yamaha SR500

In the 21st century, the motorcycle industry is mainly dominated by Indian and Japanese motorcycle companies. In addition to the large capacity motorcycles, there is a large market in smaller capacity (less than 300 cc) motorcycles, mostly concentrated in Asian and African countries and produced in China and India. A Japanese example is the 1958 Honda Super Cub, which went on to become the biggest selling vehicle of all time, with its 60 millionth unit produced in April 2008. Today, this area is dominated by mostly Indian companies with Hero MotoCorp emerging as the world's largest manufacturer of two wheelers. Its Splendor model has sold more than 8.5 million to date. Other major producers are Bajaj and TVS Motors.

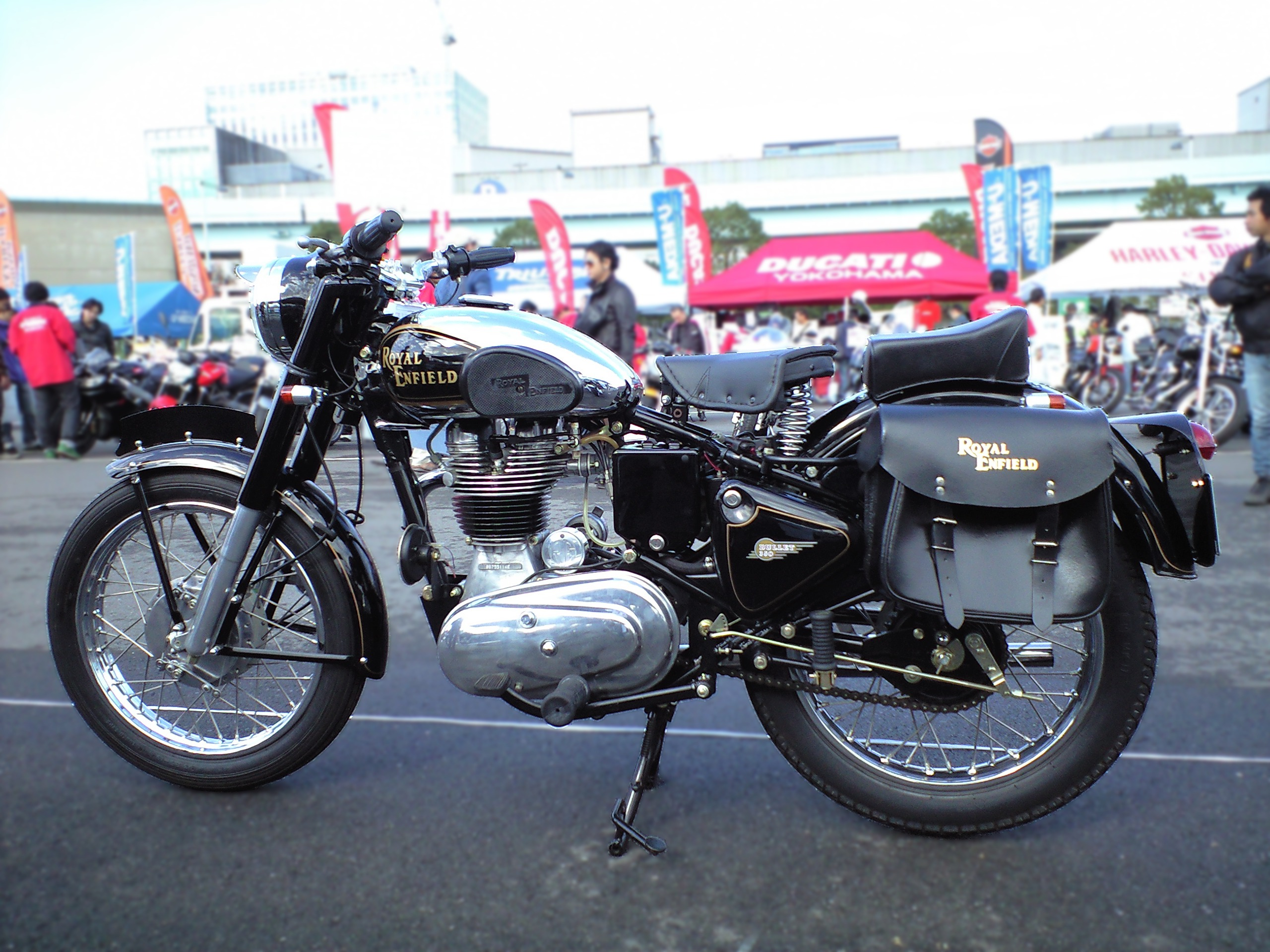
Royal Enfield Bullet

== Technical aspects ==
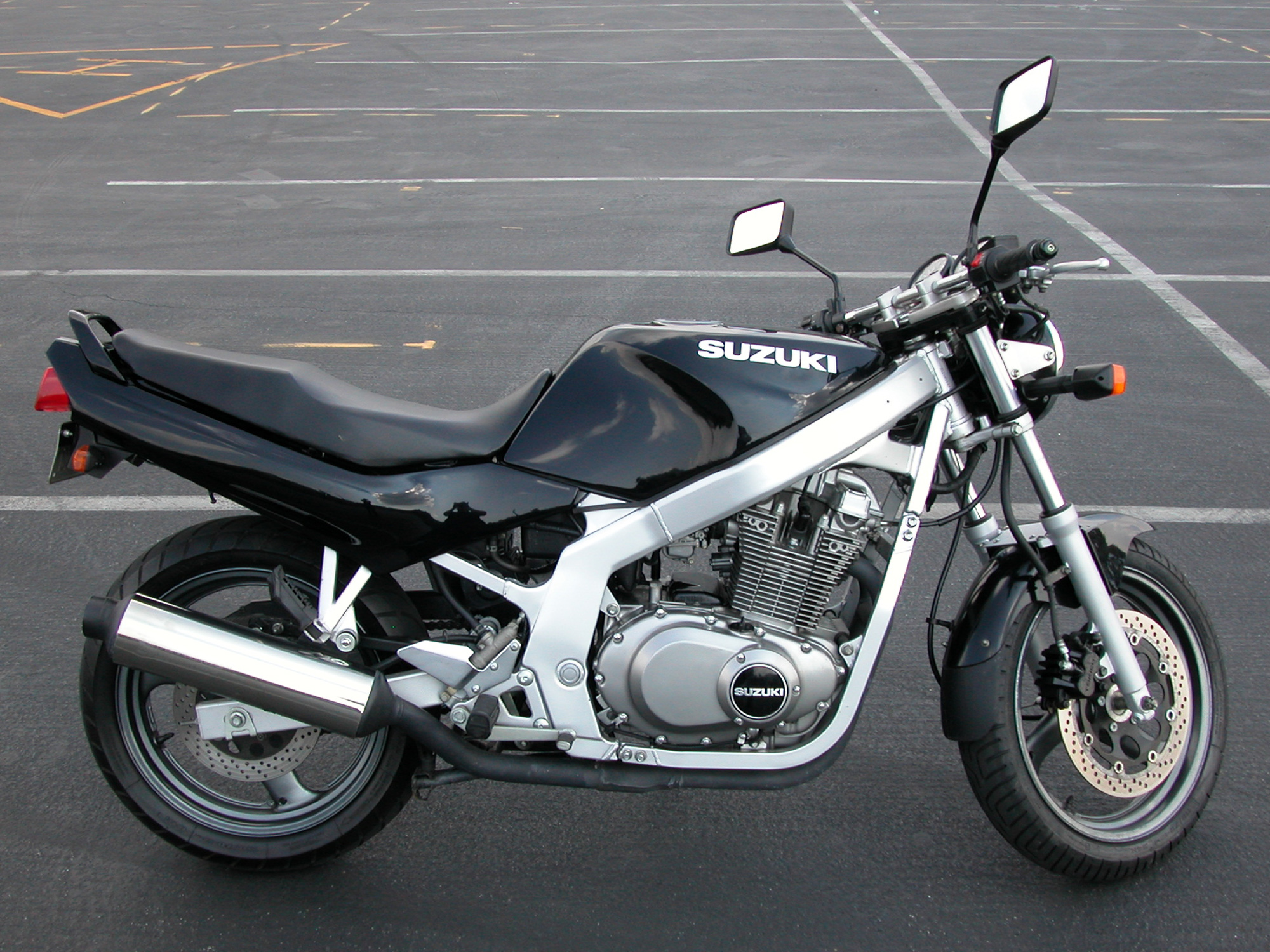
A Suzuki GS500 with a clearly visible frame, painted silver

=== Construction ===
Motorcycle construction is the engineering, manufacturing, and assembly of components and systems for a motorcycle which results in the performance, cost, and aesthetics desired by the designer. With some exceptions, construction of modern mass-produced motorcycles has standardised on a steel or aluminium frame, telescopic forks holding the front wheel, and disc brakes. Some other body parts, designed for either aesthetic or performance reasons may be added. A petrol-powered engine typically consisting of between one and four cylinders (and less commonly, up to eight cylinders) coupled to a manual five- or six-speed sequential transmission drives the swingarm-mounted rear wheel by a chain, driveshaft, or belt. The repair can be done using a motorcycle lift.

=== Fuel economy ===
Motorcycle fuel economy varies greatly with engine displacement and riding style. A streamlined, fully faired Matzu Matsuzawa Honda XL125 achieved 470 mpg_{‑US} (0.50 L/100 km; 560 mpg_{‑imp}) in the Craig Vetter Fuel Economy Challenge "on real highways – in real conditions". Due to low engine displacements (100–200 cc (6.1–12.2 cu in)), and high power-to-mass ratios, motorcycles offer good fuel economy. Under conditions of fuel scarcity like 1950s Britain and modern developing nations, motorcycles claim large shares of the vehicle market. In the United States, the average motorcycle fuel economy is 44 miles per US gallon (19 km per liter).

==== Electric motorcycles ====
Very high fuel economy equivalents are often derived by electric motorcycles. Electric motorcycles are nearly silent, zero-emission electric motor-driven vehicles. Operating range and top speed are limited by battery technology. Fuel cells and petroleum-electric hybrids are also under development to extend the range and improve performance of the electric drive system.

=== Reliability ===
A 2013 survey of 4,424 readers of the US Consumer Reports magazine collected reliability data on 4,680 motorcycles purchased new from 2009 to 2012. The most common problem areas were accessories, brakes, electrical (including starters, charging, ignition), and fuel systems, and the types of motorcycles with the greatest problems were touring, off-road/dual sport, sport-touring, and cruisers. There were not enough sport bikes in the survey for a statistically significant conclusion, though the data hinted at reliability as good as cruisers. These results may be partially explained by accessories including such equipment as fairings, luggage, and auxiliary lighting, which are frequently added to touring, adventure touring/dual sport and sport touring bikes. Trouble with fuel systems is often the result of improper winter storage, and brake problems may also be due to poor maintenance. Of the five brands with enough data to draw conclusions, Honda, Kawasaki and Yamaha were statistically tied, with 11 to 14% of those bikes in the survey experiencing major repairs. Harley-Davidsons had a rate of 24%, while BMWs did worse, with 30% of those needing major repairs. There were not enough Triumph and Suzuki motorcycles surveyed for a statistically sound conclusion, though it appeared Suzukis were as reliable as the other three Japanese brands while Triumphs were comparable to Harley-Davidson and BMW. Three-fourths of the repairs in the survey cost less than US$200 and two-thirds of the motorcycles were repaired in less than two days. In spite of their relatively worse reliability in this survey, Harley-Davidson and BMW owners showed the greatest owner satisfaction, and three-fourths of them said they would buy the same bike again, followed by 72% of Honda owners and 60 to 63% of Kawasaki and Yamaha owners.

=== Dynamics ===
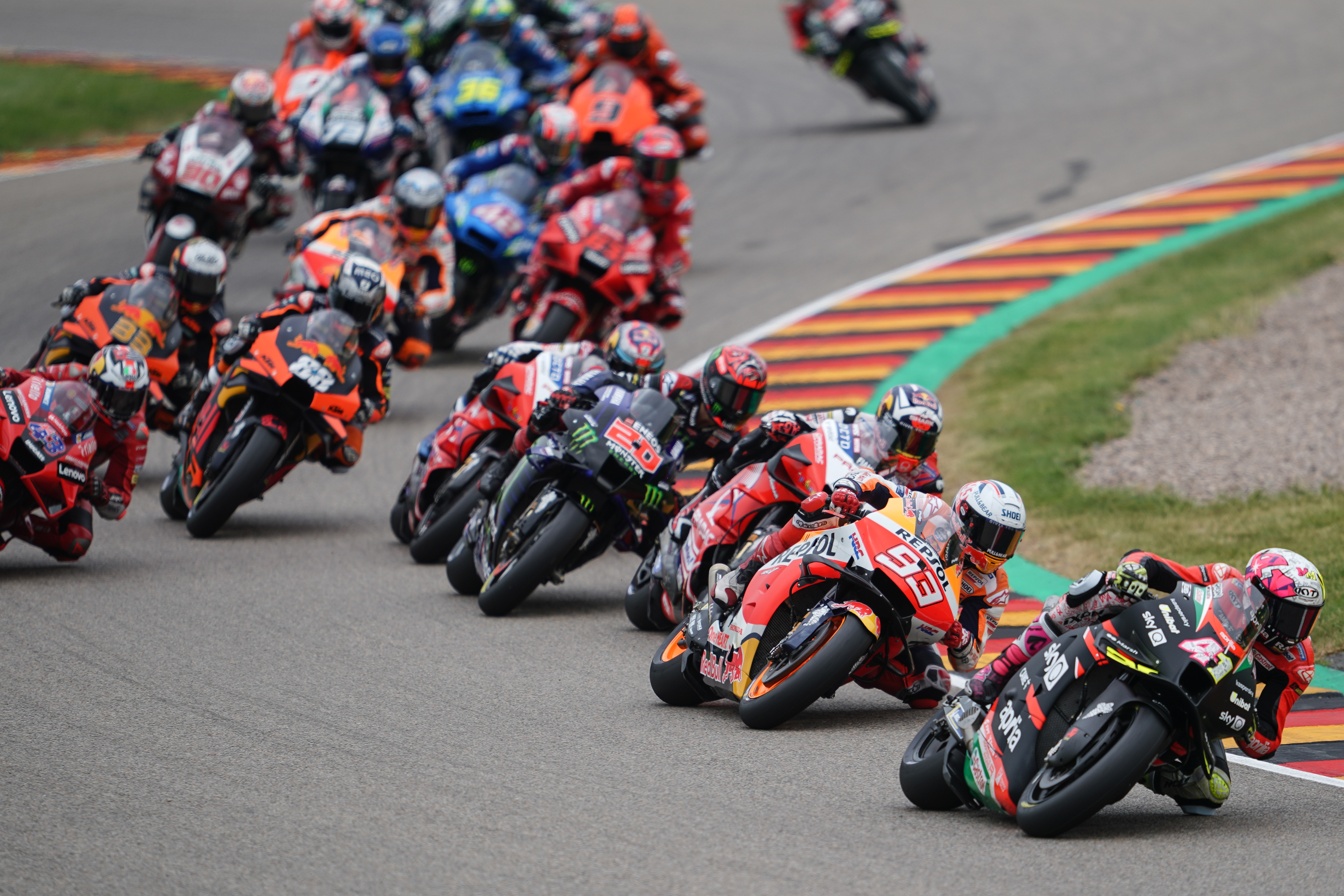
Racing motorcycles leaning in a turn

Two-wheeled motorcycles stay upright while rolling due to a physical property known as conservation of angular momentum in the wheels. Angular momentum points along the axle, and it "wants" to stay pointing in that direction.

Different types of motorcycles have different dynamics and these play a role in how a motorcycle performs in given conditions. For example, one with a longer wheelbase provides the feeling of more stability by responding less to disturbances. Motorcycle tyres have a large influence over handling.

Motorcycles must be leaned in order to make turns. This lean is induced by the method known as countersteering, in which the rider momentarily steers the handlebars in the direction opposite of the desired turn. This practice is counterintuitive and therefore often confusing to novices – and even many experienced motorcyclists.

With such short wheelbase, motorcycles can generate enough torque at the rear wheel, and enough stopping force at the front wheel, to lift the opposite wheel off the road. These actions, if performed on purpose, are known as wheelies and stoppies (or endos) respectively.

=== Accessories ===
Various features and accessories may be attached to a motorcycle either as OEM (factory-fitted) or aftermarket. Such accessories are selected by the owner to enhance the motorcycle's appearance, safety, performance, or comfort, and may include anything from mobile electronics to sidecars and trailers.

== Records ==
- The world record for the longest motorcycle jump was set in 2008 by Robbie Maddison with 107 metres (351 ft).
- Since late 2010, the Ack Attack team has held the motorcycle land-speed record at 376.36 mph (605.69 km/h).

== Safety ==
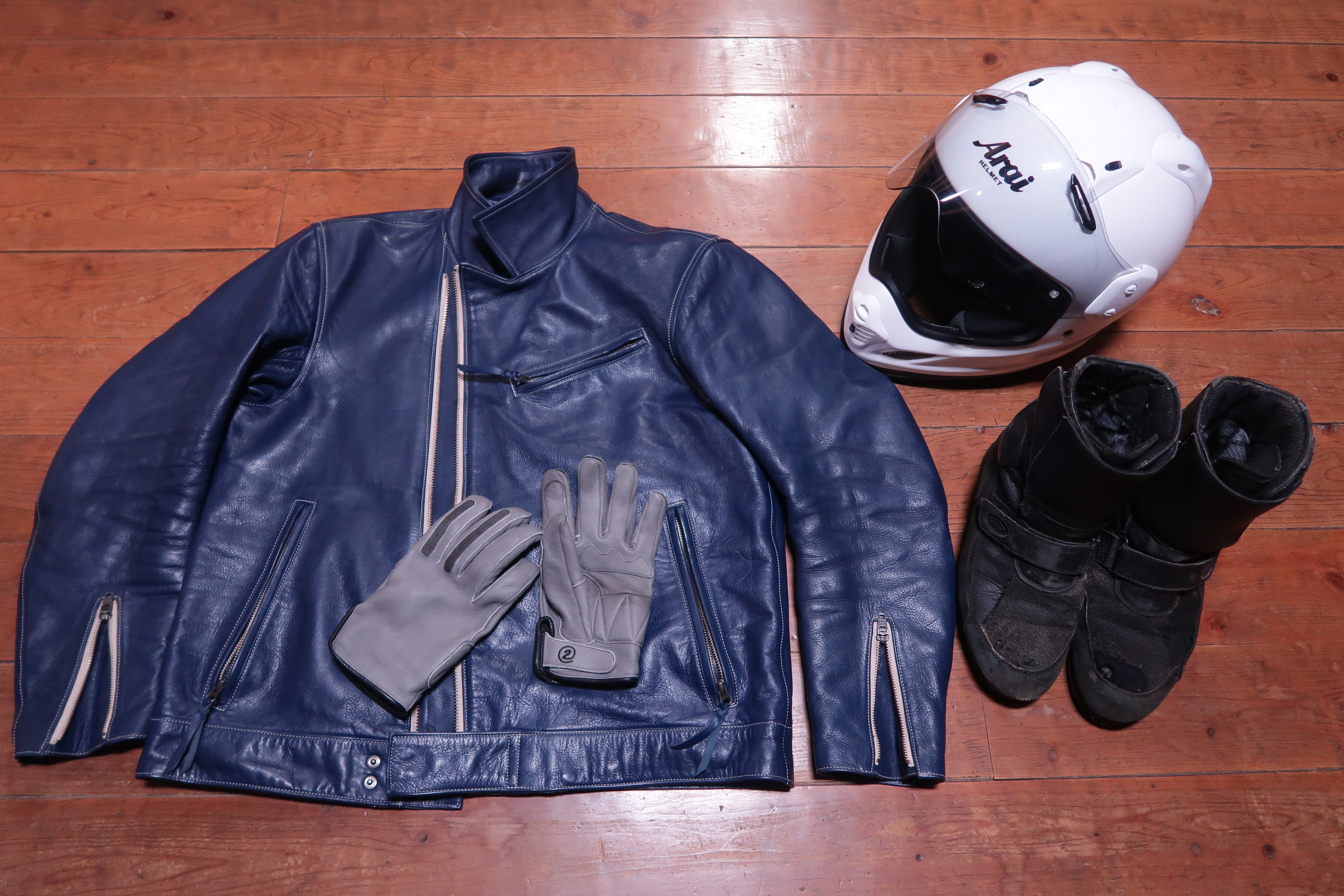
Motorcycle equipment

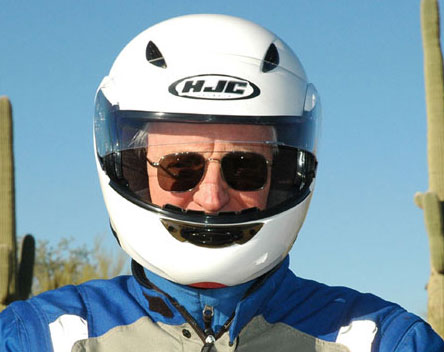
Wearing a motorcycle helmet (which is a legal requirement in many countries) reduces the risks of death or head injury in a motorcycle crash.

Motorcycles have a higher rate of fatal accidents than automobiles or trucks and buses. United States Department of Transportation data for 2005 from the Fatality Analysis Reporting System show that for passenger cars, 18.62 fatal crashes occur per 100,000 registered vehicles. For motorcycles this figure is 75.19 per 100,000 registered vehicles – four times higher than for cars. Per 100 million VMT in 2024 in the U.S., the fatality rate for motorcyclists (28.00) was almost 27 times the passenger car occupant fatality rate (1.05) and over 44 times the fatality rate for light-truck occupants (0.63). The motorcyclist injury rate (391) was nearly 5 times the injury rate of passenger car occupants (86) and over 7 times the injury rate of light-truck occupants (54). Motorcycle accident rates have increased significantly since the end of the 1990s, while the rates have dropped for passenger cars.

The most common scenario for motorcycle accidents in the United States is a motorist pulling out or turning in front of a motorcyclist, violating their right-of-way. This is sometimes called a SMIDSY, an acronym for the motorists' common response of "Sorry mate, I didn't see you". Motorcyclists can anticipate and avoid some of these crashes with proper training, increasing their visibility to other traffic, keeping to the speed limits, and not consuming alcohol or other drugs before riding.

The United Kingdom has several organisations dedicated to improving motorcycle safety by providing advanced rider training beyond what is necessary to pass the basic motorcycle licence test. These include the Institute of Advanced Motorists (IAM) and the Royal Society for the Prevention of Accidents (RoSPA). Along with increased personal safety, riders with these advanced qualifications may benefit from reduced insurance costs.

In South Africa, the Think Bike campaign is dedicated to increasing both motorcycle safety and the awareness of motorcycles on the country's roads. The campaign, while strongest in the Gauteng province, has representation in Western Cape, KwaZulu Natal and the Free State. It has dozens of trained marshals available for various events such as cycle races and is deeply involved in numerous other projects such as the annual Motorcycle Toy Run.

Motorcycle safety education is offered throughout the United States by organisations including state agencies, non-profit organisations, and corporations. Most states use the courses designed by the Motorcycle Safety Foundation (MSF), while Oregon and Idaho developed their own. All of the training programs include a Basic Rider Course, an Intermediate Rider Course and an Advanced Rider Course.

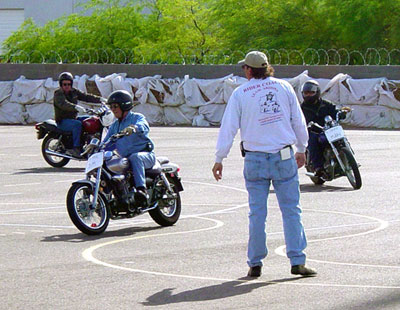
An MSF rider course for novices

In Ireland, since 2010, in the UK and some Australian jurisdictions, such as Victoria, New South Wales, the Australian Capital Territory, Tasmania and the Northern Territory, it is compulsory to complete a basic rider training course before being issued a Learners Licence, after which they can ride on public roads.

In Canada, motorcycle rider training is compulsory in Quebec and Manitoba only, but all provinces and territories have graduated licence programs which place restrictions on new drivers until they have gained experience. Eligibility for a full motorcycle licence or endorsement for completing a Motorcycle Safety course varies by province. Without the Motorcycle Safety Course the chance of getting insurance for the motorcycle is very low. The Canada Safety Council, a non-profit safety organisation, offers the Gearing Up program across Canada and is endorsed by the Motorcycle and Moped Industry Council. Training course graduates may qualify for reduced insurance premiums.

Motorcyclists and motor scooter riders are also exposed to an increased risk of suffering hearing damage such as hearing loss and tinnitus (ringing ears). The noise is caused by wind noise while riding, rolling noise from the tyres and the engine itself. The helmet only provides insufficient protection against high sound pressure levels. Medicine (as of 2024) is not able to cure hearing damage. Wearing hearing protection, such as special earplugs for motorcyclists, can help prevent hearing damage.

== Motorcycle rider postures ==
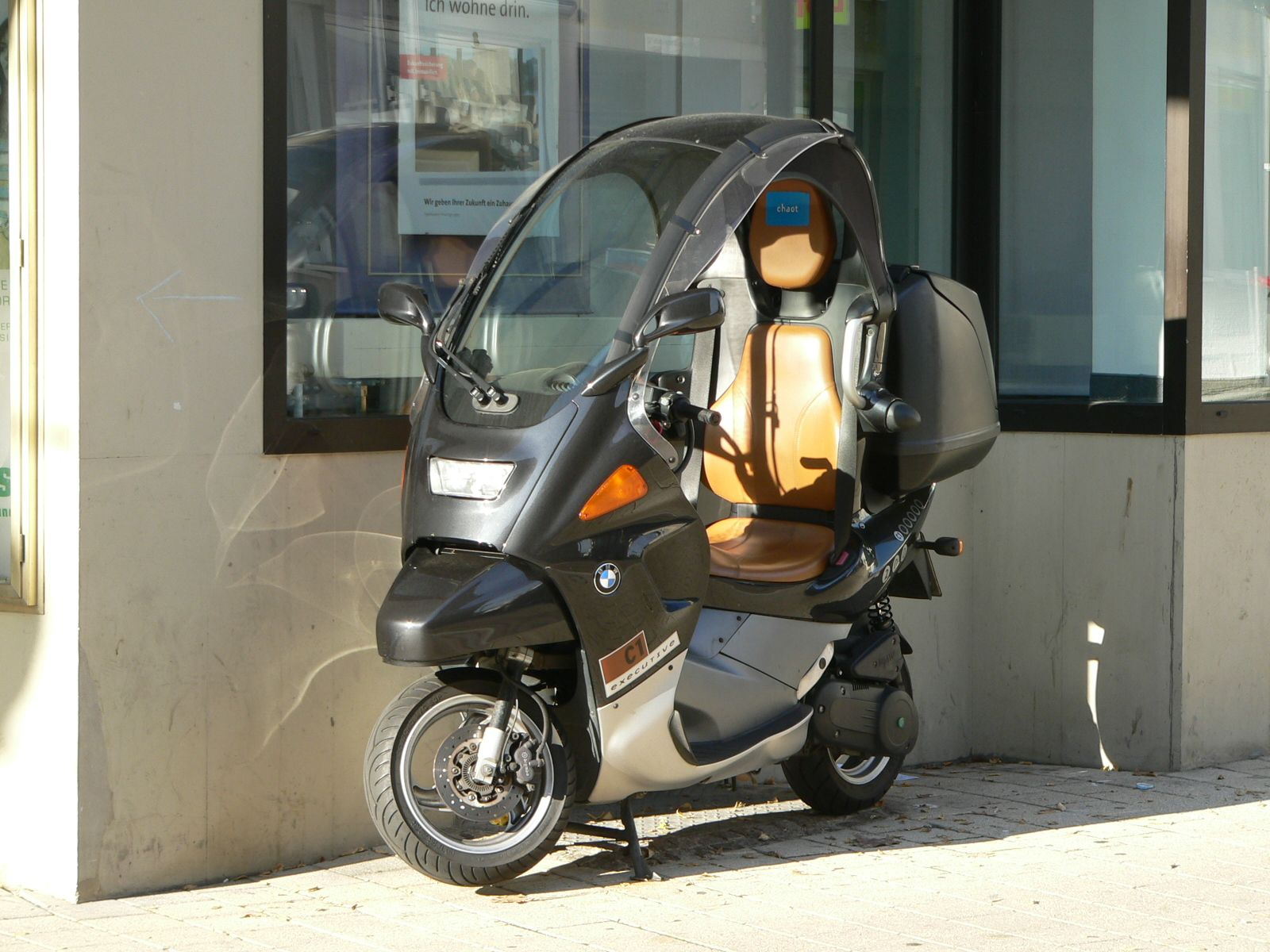
BMW C1, with a more upright seating position

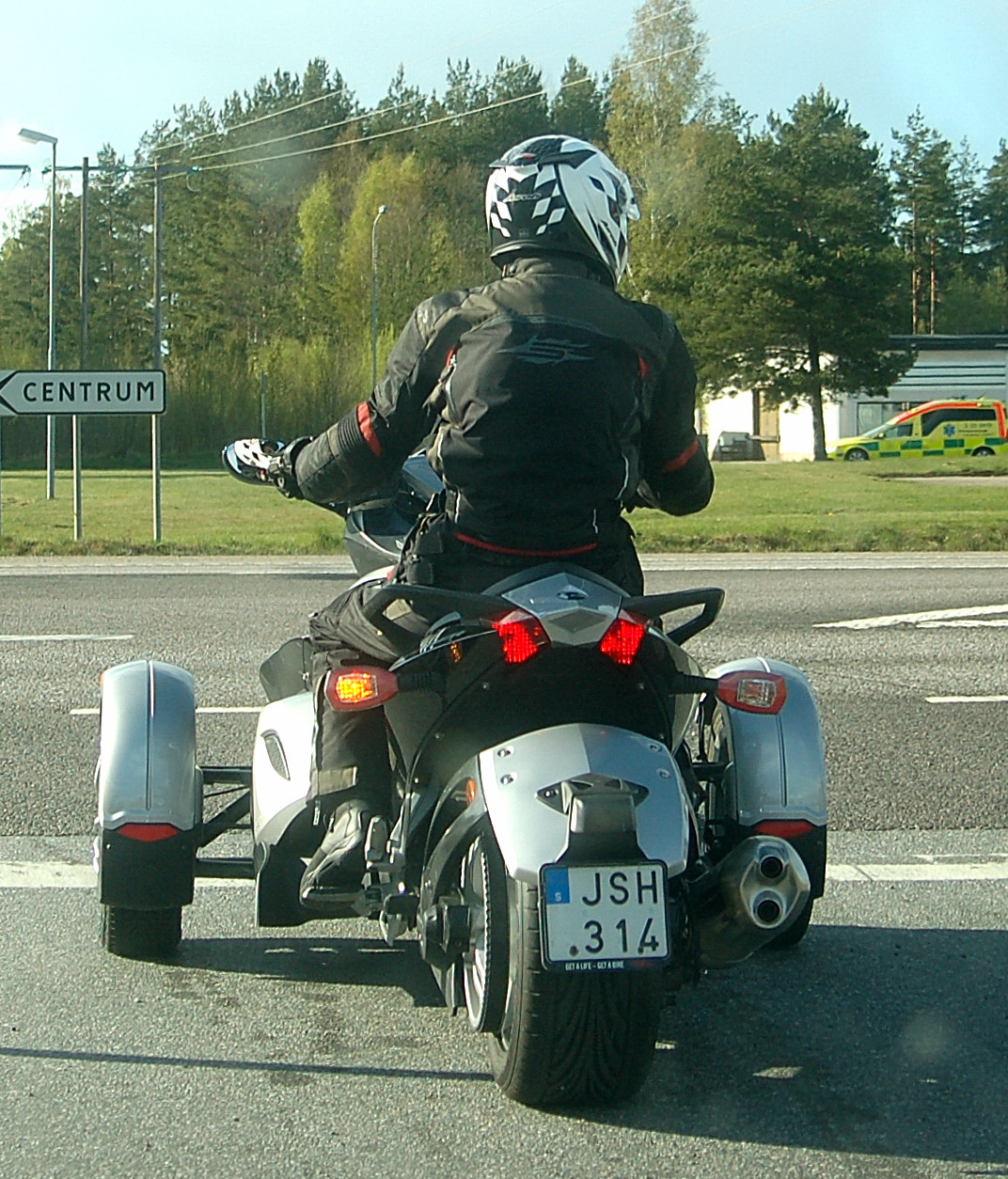
Bombardier Can-Am Spyder, showing location of rider on the trike

The motorcyclist's riding position depends on rider body-geometry (anthropometry) combined with the geometry of the motorcycle itself. These factors create a set of three basic postures.

- Sport – the rider leans forward into the wind and the weight of the upper torso is supported by the rider's core at low speed and air pressure at high speed. The footpegs are below the rider or to the rear. The reduced frontal area cuts wind resistance and allows higher speeds. At low-speed in this position the rider's arms may bear some of the weight of the rider's torso, which can be problematic.
- Standard – the rider sits upright or leans forward slightly. The feet are below the rider. These are motorcycles that are not specialised to one task, so they do not excel in any particular area. The standard posture is used with touring and commuting as well as dirt and dual-sport bikes, and may offer advantages for beginners.
- Cruiser – the rider sits at a lower seat height with the upper torso upright or leaning slightly rearward. Legs are extended forwards, sometimes out of reach of the regular controls on cruiser pegs. The low seat height can be a consideration for new or short riders. Handlebars tend to be high and wide. The emphasis is on comfort while compromising cornering ability because of low ground clearance and the greater likelihood of scraping foot pegs, floor boards, or other parts if turns are taken at the speeds other motorcycles can more readily accomplish.

Factors of a motorcycle's ergonomic geometry that determine the seating posture include the height, angle and location of footpegs, seat and handlebars. Factors in a rider's physical geometry that contribute to seating posture include torso, arm, thigh and leg length, and overall rider height.

== Customized styles and subcultures ==
While motorcycles are manufactured in standard styles (sport, cruiser, enduro, etc...), certain styles of motorcycle sub-genres have been both independently created, or manufactured in accordance with a pre-existing cultural style. Styles of note include: Café racers, Choppers, and Streetfighters.

Cultural influence has directly led to the manufacturing of certain styles of motorcycles such as the Café racer. The stylistic choices and aerodynamic benefits of these custom bikes garnered a tremendous popularity which lead manufacturers to adopt the visual cues, and attempt to mimic the custom builds of these motorcycles. Notably, Harley-Davidson also leaned into a popular custom motorcycle culture (the Chopper), producing the Harley "soft-tail". This design attempted to appear as a hard tail chopper style build, while maintaining rear suspension yet having an aggressive riding angle similar to that of the custom builds.

== Legal definitions and restrictions ==
A motorcycle is broadly defined by law in most countries for the purposes of registration, taxation and rider licensing as a powered two-wheel motor vehicle. Most countries distinguish between mopeds of 49 cc and the more powerful, larger vehicles, including scooter type motorcycles. Many jurisdictions include some forms of three-wheeled cars as motorcycles.

In Nigeria, motorcycles, popularly referred to as Okada have been subject of many controversies with regards to safety and security followed by restriction of movement in many states. In 2020, it was banned in Lagos, Nigeria's most populous city.

In Iran, women are not allowed to ride motorcycles.

== Environmental impact ==
Motorcycles and scooters' low fuel consumption has attracted interest in the United States from environmentalists and those affected by increased fuel prices. Piaggio Group Americas supported this interest with the launch of a "Vespanomics" website and platform, claiming lower per-mile carbon emissions of 0.4 lb/mile (113 g/km) less than the average car, a 65% reduction, and better fuel economy.

However, a motorcycle's exhaust emissions may contain 10–20 times more oxides of nitrogen (NOx), carbon monoxide, and unburned hydrocarbons than exhaust from a similar-year passenger car or SUV. This is because many motorcycles lack a catalytic converter, and the emission standard is much more permissive for motorcycles than for other vehicles. While catalytic converters have been installed in most gasoline-powered cars and trucks since 1975 in the United States, they can present fitment and heat difficulties in motorcycle applications.

United States Environmental Protection Agency 2007 certification result reports for all vehicles versus on highway motorcycles (which also includes scooters), the average certified emissions level for 12,327 vehicles tested was 0.734. The average "Nox+Co End-Of-Useful-Life-Emissions" for 3,863 motorcycles tested was 0.8531. 54% of the tested 2007-model motorcycles were equipped with a catalytic converter.

=== United States emissions limits ===
The following table shows maximum acceptable legal emissions of the combination of hydrocarbons, oxides of nitrogen, and carbon monoxide for new motorcycles sold in the United States with 280 cc or greater piston displacement.

| Tier | Model year | HC+NOx (g/km) | CO (g/km) |
|---|---|---|---|
| Tier 1 | 2006–2009 | 1.4 | 12.0 |
| Tier 2 | 2010 and later | 0.8 | 12.0 |

The maximum acceptable legal emissions of hydrocarbon and carbon monoxide for new Class I and II motorcycles (50 cc–169 cc and 170 cc–279 cc respectively) sold in the United States are as follows:

| Model year | HC (g/km) | CO (g/km) |
|---|---|---|
| 2006 and later | 1.0 | 12.0 |

=== Europe ===
European emission standards for motorcycles are similar to those for cars. New motorcycles must meet Euro 5 standards, while cars must meet Euro 6D-temp standards. Motorcycle emission controls are being updated and it has been proposed to update to Euro 5+ in 2024.

=== Asia ===
In Asia, motorcycles are a common mode of transportation and are putting significant pressure on the region's environment. With a massive number of motorcycles, they contribute significantly to greenhouse gas emissions and urban air pollution. In India, road transport accounts for about 12% of the country's energy-related CO_{2} emissions. In Vietnam, motorcycles contribute up to 87% of the CO emissions and 94% of hydrocarbons (HC) released by vehicles in Hanoi and Ho Chi Minh City. Environmental studies show that motorcycles in Vietnam contribute approximately 29% of NOx, 90% of CO, 65% of NMVOC, and nearly 38% of PM dust in total traffic emissions. In Thailand, gasoline-powered motorcycles are reported to emit significantly higher pollution per kilometer compared to gasoline-powered cars, exacerbating urban smog. In Singapore, the NEA reported that while motorcycles account for only 15 percent of vehicles, they contribute to over 53 percent of carbon monoxide emissions from vehicles.

== See also ==
- Bicycle and motorcycle geometry
- List of motorcycle manufacturers
- List of motor scooter manufacturers and brands
- Motorcycle industry in China
- Motor tricycle
- Scooter (motorcycle)
- Streamlined motorcycle

== General references ==
- de Cet, Mirco (2002), The illustrated directory of motorcycles, MotorBooks/MBI Publishing Company, ISBN 978-0-7603-1417-3
- Davis, James R.; Anthony, Cash (2011), Motorcycle Safety and Dynamics: Vol 1, Houston, Texas: Master Strategy Group, ISBN 978-1257645886
- Falco, Charles M.; Guggenheim Museum Staff (1998), "Issues in the Evolution of the Motorcycle", in Krens, Thomas; Drutt, Matthew (eds.), The Art of the Motorcycle, Harry N. Abrams, pp. 24–31, ISBN 0-89207-207-5
- Gaetano, Cocco (2004), Motorcycle Design and Technology, Minneapolis: MotorBooks/MBI Publishing Company, ISBN 978-0-7603-1990-1
- Georgano, G.N. (2002), Early and Vintage Years, 1885-1930: The Golden Era of Coachbuilding, Mason Crest Publishers
- Kresnak, Bill (2008), Motorcycling for Dummies, Hoboken, New Jersey: For Dummies, Wiley Publishing, ISBN 978-0-470-24587-3
- Lienhard, John H. (2005), Inventing Modern: Growing Up with X-Rays, Skyscrapers, and Tailfins, Oxford University Press US, ISBN 0-19-518951-5
- Maher, Kevin; Greisler, Ben (1998), Chilton's Motorcycle Handbook, Haynes North America, p. 2.2–2.18, ISBN 0-8019-9099-8
- Setright, L.J.K. (1979), The Guinness book of motorcycling facts and feats, Guinness Superlatives, pp. 8–18, ISBN 978-0-85112-200-7
- Stermer, Bill (2006), Streetbikes: Everything You Need to Know, MotorBooks/MBI Publishing Company, ISBN 978-0-7603-2362-5
- Duglin Kennedy, Shirley (2005), The Savvy Guide to Motorcycles, Indy Tech Publishing, ISBN 978-0-7906-1316-1
- Walker, Mick (1999). Mick Walker's German Racing Motorcycles. Redline Books. ISBN 978-0-9531311-2-9.
- Walker, Mick (2006), Motorcycle: Evolution, Design, Passion, JHU Press, ISBN 978-0-8018-8530-3
- Willoughby, Vic (1982), Exotic Motorcycles, London: Osprey Publishing, Ltd, ISBN 0-85045-322-4
