= ComputorEdge Magazine =

US tech publication

ComputorEdge Magazine was first published on May 16, 1983 as The Byte Buyer in San Diego, California. It was one of the first local free distribution magazines in the United States devoted to the microcomputer. In 1988, in a dispute with the now defunct Byte Magazine, the magazine name was changed to ComputorEdge.

In its first years, the magazine published every other week. By the mid-1990s, it was publishing weekly, which led to a situation in which many of the businesses that advertised in ComputorEdge, angered by having to pay more to have their ads in each issue (since there were now twice as many issues per year), encouraged the launch of several competing computer magazines in San Diego. None of them survived.

The first person hired by the publishers to serve as editor was Dan Gookin, who later wrote the best-selling "DOS for Dummies" tutorial books. Another editor was R. Andrew Rathbone, who wrote the "Windows for Dummies" books as Andy Rathbone. Other editors included Ken Layne, later an editor and writer at Gawker Media blogs including Wonkette. Ryan Tate of Wired and Valleywag published his first article in ComputorEdge.

Beginning in the late 1980s, the magazine began printing a list of all the public dial-up computer bulletin-board systems, or BBSs, in San Diego County. As the number of BBSs grew, the list was split so that each week only a portion would run.

In the 1990s, ComputorEdge teamed with the San Diego Computer Society to sponsor the San Diego Computer Exposition, which was renamed the California Computer Expo when it moved from Golden Hall to the larger San Diego Convention Center.

After more than 24 years of publishing in San Diego, the last paper issue of the magazine was printed on December 28, 2007. The magazine continued in electronic form until March 27, 2015, when it ceased weekly activity.
