= The 5th Wave (comic strip) =

American gag cartoon, from 1981, weekly single-panel comic

- Author: Rich Tennant
- Website: the5thwave.com
- Current status/schedule: Current Sunday gag panel
- Launch date: 1981; 45 years ago
- Syndicate(s): Universal Press Syndicate/Universal Uclick/Andrews McMeel Syndication
- Genre(s): Humor, Technology

The 5th Wave is a weekly gag cartoon by Rich Tennant, published on Sundays. Started in 1981, the comic usually deals with computers and technology. Tennant's cartoons regularly appear in the For Dummies book series, and have appeared in PC Magazine and Computerworld, a magazine for which he worked from 1987 to 1999. Like most gag cartoons, Tennant's comics have no continuity, no recurring characters, and no storylines that continue into the next week.

The name of the comic comes from Future Shock by Alvin Toffler. In this book, societies are listed in waves, e.g., the Agricultural Age is the First Wave, the Industrial Age is the Second Wave, and the Information Age is the Third Wave. Tennant wanted to call his comic The Fourth Wave, but "through a series of missteps and miscommunications", it was first published in a newspaper under the title The 5th Wave, and the name stuck.

== See also ==
- User Friendly, a character-oriented comic that also heavily features technical humor
