= SAT Game For Dummies =

SAT Game for Dummies is a board game designed to help students prepare for the SAT. The game is trivia-based, and is intended for use as an alternative to traditional SAT test preparation. The game addresses all SAT-tested categories except for the essay writing component.

== History ==
The SAT Game for Dummies was created in 2007 by BE Innovative Group Inc. in a licensing agreement with John Wiley & Sons Publishing. The game was designed to be a new mechanism of SAT-test preparation, as opposed to more traditional methods such as practice tests. In 2008, it won the National Parenting Center Seal of Approval. Bobbi Jaimet and Elsbeth Vaino of BE Innovative Group started developing the game in 2003.

== Style and gameplay ==
The game is designed as a member of the "...For Dummies" product line, and is stylized in a manner similar to other products in that line. The game offers solutions to SAT-style questions using simple and direct prose and wording.

== Reception ==
Virginia Linn for the Pittsburgh Post-Gazette said that for her daughter, "the game provided a chance for group study and a welcome diversion from the drudgery faced by many who prep for the tests". The National Parenting Center said that "This is an asset that you will want your child to have in his or her studying arsenal." Dipika Mirpuri for About.com said that it was "Overall, an interesting and welcome twist to aid in preparing for the SAT."

The game sold out at Toy Fair '08.
