= Andy Rathbone =

American writer

- Born: c. 1961 (age 64–65); San Diego, California
- Other name: R. Andrew Rathbone
- Education: San Diego State University
- Occupation: Author, journalist
- Years active: 1983–present
- Website: andyrathbone.com

R. Andrew "Andy" Rathbone (born 1961) is the author of For Dummies books about Microsoft Windows as well as other computing books.

== Early life and education ==
Rathbone was born in San Diego, California and attended Clairemont High School, where he was befriended by writer Cameron Crowe who was undercover as a student to research for his book, Fast Times at Ridgemont High, which was published in 1981 and released as a movie in 1982.

Mark "The Rat" Ratner, the shy teenager who has a crush on Jennifer Jason Leigh's character in the movie, was modeled on Rathbone, who was called "A Rat" by peers. The portrayal embarrassed Rathbone, who said "all the nerdy things I did were attributed to me and all the cool things I did attributed to someone else." He considered legal action but dropped it after talking to Crowe. Rathbone later said, "I didn't have too much going for me, and it hit hard". He was later featured in an article called "Geek God" in the March 13, 1995 issue of People magazine.

Rathbone attended San Diego State University, where he majored in comparative literature and was the editor-in-chief of the Daily Aztec newspaper. He took three years off following the release of Fast Times at Ridgemont High, returning in 1984 and graduating in 1986.

== Career ==
Rathbone worked as a reporter for the La Jolla Light newspaper and an editor at ComputorEdge Magazine, as well as freelancing for PC World, Computerworld and CompuServe.

In 1992, Rathbone coauthored PCs for Dummies with Dan Gookin, which became a New York Times bestseller. He went on to write various Windows for Dummies books and other computer guides, writing with humor (such as a "Ten Dumb Things You Can Do with a Laptop" chapter) and writing with his mom in mind, who "doesn't know anything about computers". Rathbone has published about 50 computer books. Several of his For Dummies books have made USA Today's bestseller list. In 1992, Rathbone’s Windows For Dummies became the world’s best-selling computer book and remains so with more than 15 million copies sold by 2019.

== Personal life ==
Andy and Tina Rathbone got married after they met in 1989. Tina went on to write Modems for Dummies, and the couple traveled together to promote their books. They were spokespeople for Compaq computers. In 1995, it was reported that they lived in the Point Loma area of San Diego, California with their cat Laptop. Tina died in 2023.
