= Edward Butler (inventor) =

English inventor

- Born: September 1862; Bickington (Chipley), Newton Abbott, Devon, England
- Died: 1940 (aged 77–78); Wandsworth, London, England
- Education: Sibree's, Bussage House, Stroud, Gloucestershire
- Spouse: Kate Gildersleeves (m. 1886)
- Children: 2
- Engineering career
- Projects: First Petrol powered motor tricycle
- Significant design: Butler Petrol-Cycle
- Significant advance: Petroleum Engine

Edward Butler (1862–1940) was an English inventor who produced an early three-wheeled petrol automobile, marketed as the Butler Petrol Cycle. Butler having applied for a patent, granted as No. GB 15598, in November 1887, for: "Improvement in Hydrocarbon Motors and in the "Method of their Application for the Propulsion of Tricycles and other Light Vehicles", and built a prototype at F.B. Shuttleworth, of Erith, London.

Butler first showed plans for a three-wheeled petrol motor tricycle at the Stanley Cycle Show in London in 1884, and again at the 1885 Inventions Exhibition, also in London. Butler built his first car in 1888.

For comparison, Carl Benz, who is generally recognised as the inventor of the modern automobile, built his first working motorcar in 1885, and unveiled it to the public in 1886.

== Butler Petrol Cycle ==
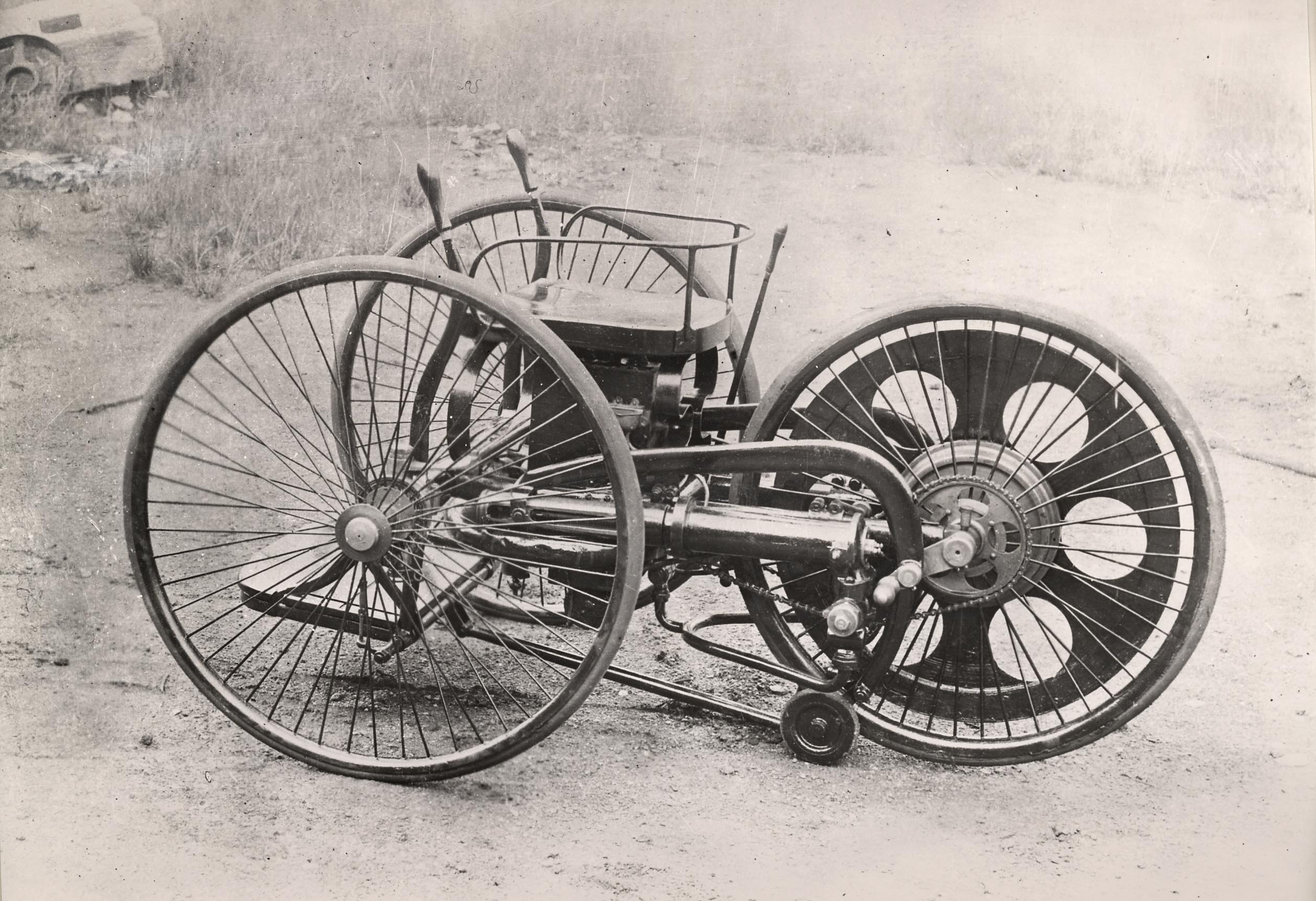
Butler's Patent Velocycle 1887

Built by the Merryweather Fire Engine company in Greenwich, in 1888, the Butler Petrol Cycle (first recorded use of the term) was a three-wheeled petrol vehicle. The rear wheel was directly driven by a ^{5}/_{8}hp (466W) 600 cc (40 in^{3}; 2¼×5-inch {57×127-mm}) flat twin four-stroke engine (with magneto ignition replaced by coil and battery), equipped with rotary valves and a float-fed carburettor (five years before Maybach), and Ackermann steering, all of which were state of the art at the time. The engine was liquid-cooled, with a radiator over the rear driving wheel. Speed was controlled by means of a throttle valve lever. The driver was seated between the front wheels.

In 1889 Butler applied, as Butlers Petrol-Cycle Syndicate Limited, for a parallel US patent, being granted 437,973, on October 7, 1890. The vehicle featured in an article in the 14 February 1891 issue of Scientific American, where it was stated that one gallon of fuel in the form of petroleum or benzolene could propel the vehicle for forty miles (5.9 L/100 km) at a speed of 3–10 mph (4.8–16.1 km/h).

Butler improved the specifications of his vehicle over the years, but was prevented from adequately testing it by the Locomotive Acts, which imposed a maximum speed for self-propelled road vehicles of 2 mph (3.2 km/h) in towns and 4 mph (6.4 km/h) elsewhere. Additionally, the vehicle had to be attended by three people, one of whom had to proceed in front of the vehicle to assist oncoming horse-riders and carriages.

Butler wrote in the magazine The English Mechanic in 1890, "The authorities do not countenance its use on the roads, and I have abandoned in consequence any further development of it."

Due to general lack of interest, Butler broke up his machine for scrap in 1896, and sold the patent rights to Harry J. Lawson who continued manufacture of the engine for use in motorboats.

Instead, Butler turned to making stationary and marine engines. His motor tricycle was in advance of its better-known contemporaries on several points.

== See also ==
- List of car manufacturers of the United Kingdom
- List of motorcycles of the 1890s
