= Dan Gookin =

American politician and author (born 1960)

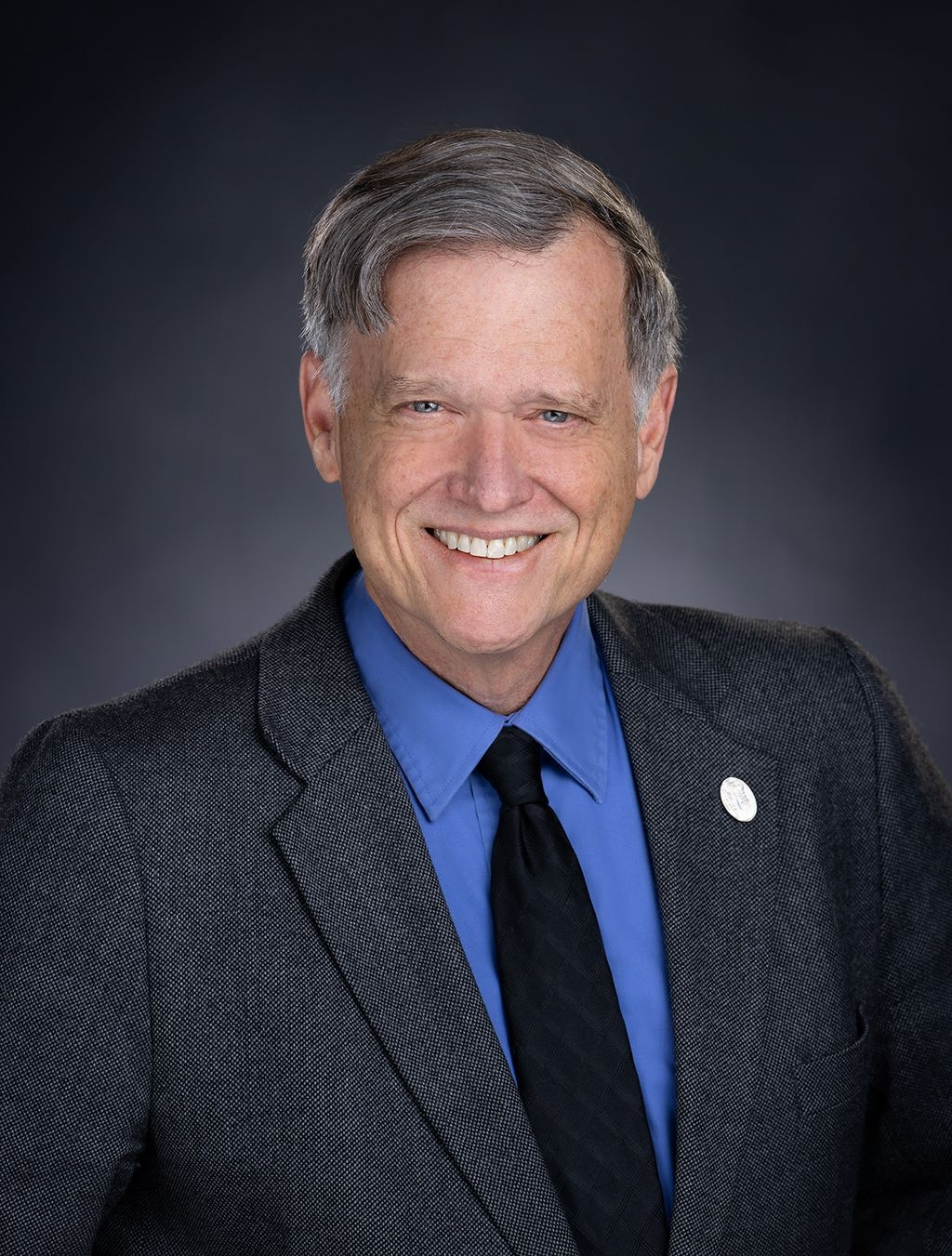
- Gookin in 2026

37th Mayor of Coeur d'Alene
- Incumbent
- Assumed office January 6th, 2026
- Preceded by: Woody McEvers

Member of the Coeur d'Alene City Council for Seat 3
- In office January 2nd, 2012 – January 20th, 2026
- Preceded by: A. J. Hassell III
- Succeeded by: Dan Sheckler

Personal details
- Born: 1960 (age 65–66) San Diego, California, U.S.
- Party: Republican
- Other political affiliations: Libertarian
- Education: University of California, San Diego (BA)
- Occupation: Computer book author; politician
- Website: wambooli.com

Dan Gookin (born 1960) is an American politician and author who is the mayor of Coeur d'Alene, Idaho. He has served as a member on the Coeur d’Alene City Council. He is best known for writing the first For Dummies books including DOS For Dummies and PCs For Dummies, which established the humorous and accessible style of the long-running For Dummies series.

== Background ==
Gookin earned a Bachelor of Arts degree in communications and visual arts from the University of California, San Diego. He has written over 150 computer books. His website provides computer help sections and a blog which is updated several times a week. From 1987 to 1989, he served as editor of ComputorEdge Magazine, a computer periodical in San Diego.

Gookin lives in Coeur d'Alene where he has been active in the local arts community, serving as the artistic director of the Lake City Playhouse. He first ran unsuccessfully for the Idaho Senate in 2004 as a Libertarian. Later, in November 2011, he was elected to a seat on the Coeur d'Alene City Council, defeating former Democratic state representative George Saylor.

During the COVID-19 pandemic, Gookin was a vocal critic of mask mandates in Idaho, voting against a Coeur d’Alene citywide mask requirement that the council approved in October 2020 by a 4–2 vote. He frequently spoke at public meetings and appeared at protests opposing face-covering requirements. Gookin later drew controversy after posting a photo of a blank COVID-19 vaccination card that he said he had purchased from a Facebook friend. He said that he did not use the card and emphasized that his intent was to demonstrate how easily vaccination cards could be forged. Gookin said the requirement to present proof of vaccination is “another injustice in the ongoing COVID-19 saga.”

Gookin is an elected precinct committeeman for the Kootenai County Republican Central Committee (KCRCC), an organization he openly criticizes. In 2023, during a forum hosted by the Kootenai County Republican Women Federated (KCRWF), a subsidiary of the KCRCC, Gookin was questioned by members of both organizations about remarks on his YouTube channel Kootenai Rants which they viewed as "derogatory" toward Christians and Republicans. The exchange grew tense after Gookin defended his comments and accused the committee of refusing to condemn white supremacy and David Reilly, a former KCRCC endorsee who has been accused of antisemitic and white supremacist affiliations, leading to a heated confrontation in which a moderator briefly ripped the microphone from his hand.

Since the 2023 forum and the subsequent defamation lawsuit and 2025 settlement, Gookin has remained publicly critical of the KCRCC and its chairman, Brent Regan, accusing the committee of internal bias and a lack of transparency, while its leadership has maintained that his comments exceed the bounds of "protected" political speech. Gookin appeared as himself on the television series To Tell the Truth, where the panel attempted to determine whether he or another contestant was the author of the first For Dummies book. In November 2025, Gookin was elected mayor of Coeur d'Alene with 34.19% of the vote, with his primary challengers Debbie Loffman and the incumbent mayor Woody McEvers receiving 28% and 26.46% of the vote, respectively.

== Electoral history ==
2025 Coeur d'Alene mayoral election
Party	Candidate	Votes	%
Nonpartisan	Dan Gookin	3,265	34.19%
Nonpartisan	Debbie Loffman	2,674	28.00%
Nonpartisan	Woody McEvers	2,527	26.46%
Nonpartisan	John Pulsipher	1,084	11.35%
Total votes		9,550	100.00%

2019 Coeur d'Alene City Council election, seat #3
Party	Candidate	Votes	%
Nonpartisan	Dan Gookin (incumbent)	3,157	62.44%
Nonpartisan	Michael Pereira	1,899	37.56%
Total votes		5,056	100.00%

2015 Coeur d’Alene City Council election, seat #3
Party	Candidate	Votes	%
Nonpartisan	Dan Gookin (incumbent)	3,559	100.00%

Gookin was re-elected unopposed in 2015, increasing his share of the vote from 54.12% in 2011 to 100%.

2011 Coeur d'Alene City Council election, seat #3
Party	Candidate	Votes	%
Nonpartisan	Dan Gookin	3,409	54.12%
Nonpartisan	George C. Sayler	2,435	38.66%
Nonpartisan	Patrick "Mitch" Mitchell	239	3.79%
Nonpartisan	Annastasia Somontes	170	2.70%
Nonpartisan	Derec Aujay	46	0.73%
Total votes		6,299	100.00%

2002 Idaho Senate election, district 4
Party	Candidate	Votes	%
Republican	John Goedde (incumbent)	6,022	59.18%
Democratic	David James Hunt	3,443	33.83%
Libertarian	Dan Gookin	615	6.04%
Write-in	Barbara Harris	96	0.94%
Total votes		10,176	100.00%

== Bibliography ==
- C Programming For Dummies (For Dummies, 2020) ISBN 978-1119740247
- Android For Dummies (For Dummies, 2020) ISBN 978-1119711353
- Dan Gookin's Guide to Curl Programming (Kindle, 2019) ASIN B07ZS294W6
- Running For Local Office For Dummies (For Dummies, 2019) ISBN 978-1119588177
- Dan Gookin's Guide to Ncurses Programming (Kindle, 2017) ASIN B075FGJJCS
- Android Tablets For Dummies (For Dummies, 2014) ISBN 1-118-54319-X
- Android Phones For Dummies (For Dummies, 2014) ISBN 1-118-72030-X
- Samsung Galaxy Tabs For Dummies (For Dummies, 2013) ISBN 1-118-77294-6
- Beginning Programming with C For Dummies (For Dummies, 2013) ISBN 1-118-73763-6
- Word 2013 For Dummies (For Dummies, 2013) ISBN 1-118-49123-8
- PCs For Dummies (For Dummies, 2013) ISBN 1-118-19734-8
- Laptops For Dummies (For Dummies, 2012) ISBN 1-118-11533-3
- More DOS For Dummies (For Dummies, 1994) ISBN 1-568-84046-2
- DOS For Dummies (For Dummies, 1991) ISBN 0-764-50361-8
- Advanced MS-DOS Batch File Programming (Windcrest, 1989) ISBN 978-0830631971
