= Think Bike =

Motorcycle safety organization in South Africa

The Think Bike Campaign was started by biking enthusiasts in South Africa, and is run by bikers, in the interests of road safety and public awareness. Many motorcycle accidents happen because of a lack of awareness of the issues among the general motoring public. The aim of the campaign is to correct that through the use of stickers, leaflets, and information distributed in other ways.

== History ==
During 2005, a number of bikers were using an online forum to discuss the alarming number of unnecessary motorcycle accidents; avoidable accidents caused by inattentiveness, ignorance, incompetence, and failure to exercise due care. The Think Bike sticker campaign was started by Tony Day of Cape Town in the 1980s, and its short life was discussed, and it was decided then and there to revive the campaign and expand on its goals and methods.

== Background ==
The campaign, while strongest in the Gauteng province, has representation in Western Cape, (South African province). It has dozens of trained marshals available for various events such as cycle races and is deeply involved in numerous other projects, such as the annual Toy Run.

A number of studies have been done in the past, most notably in the United States and United Kingdom, that show that an alarming number of motorcycle accidents are directly caused by other vehicles. Being as vulnerable as they are, bikers very often emerge from these avoidable accidents seriously injured, maimed or dead.

The campaign is also aimed at the biking community, to educate about safety issues and encourage the use of protective clothing.

The Hurt Report, published in the United States in 1981, showed some alarming trends. More than 900 motorcycle accidents were investigated in the Los Angeles area, and the results showed that:

1. Approximately three-fourths of motorcycle accidents involve a collision with another vehicle, usually a passenger automobile.
2. In these accidents, the driver of the other vehicle violated the motorcycle's right of way and caused the accident in two-thirds of cases.
3. The failure of motorists to detect and recognise motorcycles in traffic is the predominant cause of motorcycle accidents. The driver of the other vehicle involved in the collision with the motorcycle did not see the motorcycle before the collision or did not see the motorcycle until too late to avoid the collision.
