= For Dummies =

Series of instructional/reference books

- Author: Various
- Illustrator: Rich Tennant (UK editions use Ed McLachlan)
- Country: United States
- Language: English
- Genre: Instructional/reference
- Publisher: IDG Books/Hungry Minds (1991–2001); Wiley (2001–present)
- Published: 1991–present
- Website: dummies.com

For Dummies is an extensive series of instructional reference books that aim to present non-intimidating guides for readers new to the various topics covered. The series has been a worldwide success, with editions in numerous languages.

The books are an example of a media franchise, consistently sporting a distinctive cover—usually yellow and black with a triangular-headed cartoon figure known as the "Dummies Man", and an informal, blackboard-style logo. Prose is simple and direct. Bold icons—such as a piece of string tied around an index finger—indicate particularly important passages.

== History ==
The first "...for Dummies" titled book was Plumbing for Dummies by Don Fredriksson, published by the Bobbs-Merrill Company in 1983. The first book in the on-going series was DOS For Dummies, written by Dan Gookin and published by IDG Books in November 1991. DOS For Dummies became popular due to the rarity of beginner-friendly materials for learning to use the MS-DOS operating system. The publisher soon released a Windows title written by Andy Rathbone. Initially, the series focused solely on software and technology, but later branched out to more general-interest titles—with topics as diverse as Acne For Dummies, Chess For Dummies, Fishing For Dummies and many other topics. The series is now published by John Wiley & Sons, Inc., which acquired Hungry Minds (the new name for IDG Books as of 2000) in early 2001. Previously, in 1976, the book The Big Dummy's Guide to CB Radio was a non-fiction bestseller.

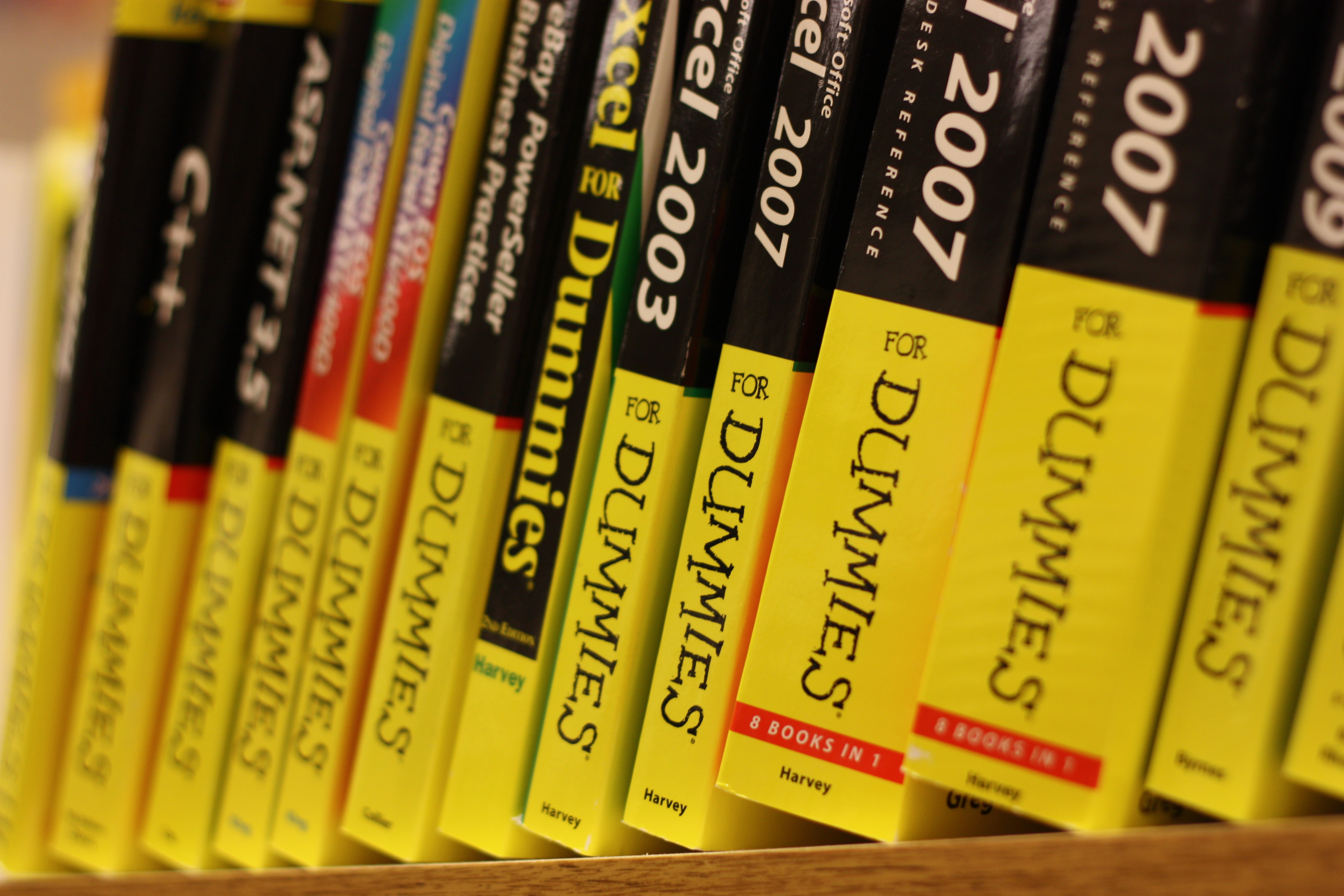
Various books in the series

Notable For Dummies books include:

- DOS For Dummies, the first, published in 1991, whose first printing was just 7,500 copies
- Windows 95 for Dummies, the top-selling For Dummies title with 3 million English-language copies sold
- L'Histoire de France pour les nuls (The History of France for Dummies), the top-selling non-English For Dummies title, with more than 400,000 sold

== Parts ==
Almost all Dummies books are organized around sections called "parts", which are groups of related chapters. Parts are almost always preceded by a Rich Tennant comic that refers to some part of the subject under discussion, though the comics were discontinued in 2012. Sometimes the same Tennant drawing reappears in another Dummies book with a new caption.

Another constant in the Dummies series is The Part of Tens, a section at the end of the books where lists of 10 items are included. They are usually resources for further study, and sometimes also include amusing bits of information that do not fit readily elsewhere.

== Examples ==
Annuals For Dummies	ISBN 9780764550560
Art History for Dummies	ISBN 9780470099100
Auto Repair for Dummies	ISBN 9780764550898
Baby Names For Dummies	ISBN 9780764543401
Catholic Mass for Dummies	ISBN 9780470767863
Catholism for Dummies	ISBN 9780764553912
Chronic Pain For Dummies	ISBN 9780471751403
Classical Music For Dummies	ISBN 9780764550096
Classical Piano Music for Dummies	ISBN 9781423428589
College Planning for Dummies	ISBN 9780764550485
Cooking Basics For Dummies	ISBN 9780764552502
Dating After 50 For Dummies	ISBN 9781118441329
Disaster Prepping For Dummies	ISBN 9781394388745
Dream Dictionary For Dummies	ISBN 9781394376438
Economics For Dummies	ISBN 9780764557262
Fishing for Dummies	ISBN 9780764550287
Free $ For College For Dummies	ISBN 9780764554674
French for Dummies	ISBN 9780764551932
Gardening For Dummies	ISBN 9781568846446
German For Dummies	ISBN 9780764551956
Getting Your Book Published For Dummies	ISBN 9780764552571
Guitar For Dummies	ISBN 9780764551062
Herb Gardening for Dummies	ISBN 9780764552007
Hobby Farming For Dummies	ISBN 9780470281727
Italian Cooking for Dummies	ISBN 9780764550980
Italian Phrases For Dummies	ISBN 9780764572036
Jewelry Making and Beading For Dummies	ISBN 9780764525711
Judaism for Dummies	ISBN 9780764552991
Knitting for Dummies	ISBN 9780764553950
Las Vegas For Dummies	ISBN 9780764561627
Linear Algebra For Dummies	ISBN 9780470430903
Linguistics for Dummies	ISBN 9781118091692
macOS Golden Gate For Dummies	ISBN 9781394457526
Making Friends as an Adult For Dummies	ISBN 9781394288458
Managerial Economics For Dummies	ISBN 9781118412046
Microeconomics For Dummies, UK Edition	ISBN 9781119026693
Mormonism For Dummies	ISBN 9781592573875
Music Theory for Dummies	ISBN 9780764578380
Parenting For Dummies	ISBN 9780764554186
Philosophy For Dummies	ISBN 9780764571954
Photoshop Elements For Dummies	ISBN 9780764516368
Physics I For Dummies	ISBN 9781119872221
Piano for Dummies	ISBN 9780764551055
Pottery Making For Dummies	ISBN 9781394417438
QuickBooks 2012 For Dummies	ISBN 9781118091203
Raising Chickens For Dummies	ISBN 9780470465448
Raising Goats for Dummies	ISBN 9780470568996
Robot Building For Dummies	ISBN 9780764540691
Sailing for Dummies	ISBN 9780764550393
Saints For Dummies	ISBN 9780470533581
Scuba Diving & Snorkeling for Dummies	ISBN 9780764551512
Spanish For Dummies	ISBN 9780764551949
Stoicism For Dummies	ISBN 9781394206278
The Bible For Dummies	ISBN 9780764552960
The Book of Revelation For Dummies	ISBN 9780470045213
Vegetable Gardening for Dummies	ISBN 9780764551291
Video Game Design For Dummies	ISBN 9781394308170
Vocabulary For Dummies	ISBN 9780764553936
Welding for Dummies	ISBN 9780470455968
Women In The Bible For Dummies	ISBN 9780764584756
"Woodworking For Dummies	ISBN 9780764539770

== Expansions and alternative versions ==
Several related series have been published, including Dummies 101, with step-by-step tutorials in a large-format book (now discontinued); More ... for Dummies, which are essentially sequels to the first ... For Dummies book on the subject; and For Dummies Quick Reference, which is a condensed alphabetical reference to the subject. A larger All-in-One Desk Reference format offers more comprehensive coverage of the subject, normally running about 750 pages. Also, some books in the series are smaller and do not follow the same formatting style as the others.

Wiley has also launched an interactive online course with Learnstreet based on its popular book, Java for Dummies, 5th edition.

A spin-off board game, Crosswords for Dummies, was produced in the late 1990s. The game is similar to Scrabble, but instead of letter tiles, players draw short strips of cardboard containing pre-built English words. The words vary in length from three to seven letters, with more points acquired for playing longer words. Another board game, SAT Game For Dummies, is used in SAT preparation. A Chess for Dummies was made, a black-and-yellow chessboard with a picture of a piece, along with a summary of how the piece moves, printed its starting positions, although there is a book with the same name.

In 2004, French publisher Anuman Interactive obtained the digital exploitation rights and launched many applications based on the For Dummies collection, such as Home Design 3D For Dummies and History For Dummies.

== See also ==
- Complete Idiot's Guides – a similar series of how-to books from Alpha Books
- FabJob – a similar series of how-to-books for starting a business or dream career
- Introducing... (book series)
- Teach Yourself – another similar series published by Hodder Headline
- Very Short Introductions, a series of introductory books on scholarly subjects published by the Oxford University Press
