= Team Oregon =

Motorcycle safety program of Oregon

Team Oregon Motorcycle Safety Program
- Founded: 1984
- Founder: Steve Garets
- Location: Corvallis, Oregon
- Product: Motorcycle safety
- Key people: Aria Minu-Sepehr, Director
- Employees: 160
- Website: team-oregon.org

Team Oregon Motorcycle Safety Program, known as Team Oregon, is an American, Oregon-based motorcycle safety partnership between the Oregon Department of Transportation (ODOT) and Oregon State University. Headed by Aria Minu-Sepehr, it is funded by ODOT through motorcycle endorsement (license) fees and student tuition. Team Oregon's training materials have been used in other states, including Idaho and Illinois, and it is the only official motorcycle safety program in Oregon. The program began in 1984.

== Overview ==
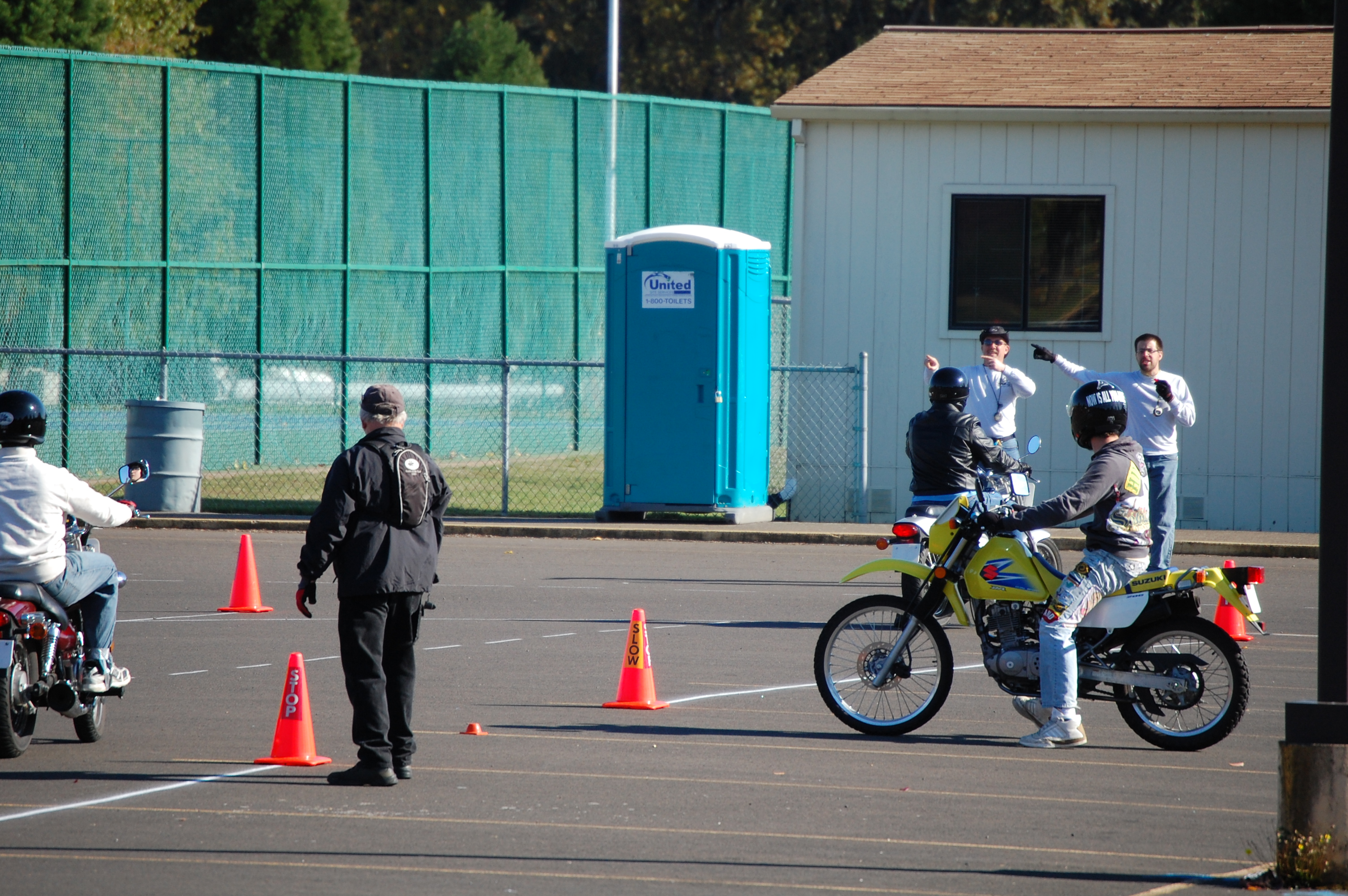
Instructors and students at McMinnville, Oregon

Since Oregon implemented the Team Oregon Motorcycle Safety Program, motorcycle fatalities have been reduced by 50%. However, motorcycle fatality rates are rising in both Oregon and nationally. Team Oregon's position, as well as that of the Oregon Department of Transportation's Traffic Safety Division, is that rider judgment and skill are critical in avoiding motorcycle accidents and fatalities. Approximately 70% of Oregon's riders receive training through Team Oregon.

Team Oregon was nationally recognized through the Motorcycle Safety Foundation (MSF) and sponsored by the Oregon Traffic Safety Commission. In December 2006, Team Oregon and Oregon State University were sued by the Motorcycle Safety Foundation for copyright infringement in the United States District Court for the Central District of California. MSF alleged Team Oregon used their materials to develop their own program. Team Oregon and MSF settled the lawsuit out of court in December 2008.

Some training programs are sponsored through local colleges, including Lane Community College, Chemeketa Community College, and Portland Community College.

Team Oregon supported 2009 Oregon Senate Bill 546, introduced by Senator Vicki Walker, which requires mandatory rider education before endorsement. The bill was signed into law on July 23, 2009 by Oregon governor Ted Kulongoski and was fully phased in by January 1, 2015. Walker is an avid motorcyclist who sponsored the bill to stem the rise in Oregon motorcycle fatalities.

== Student profile ==
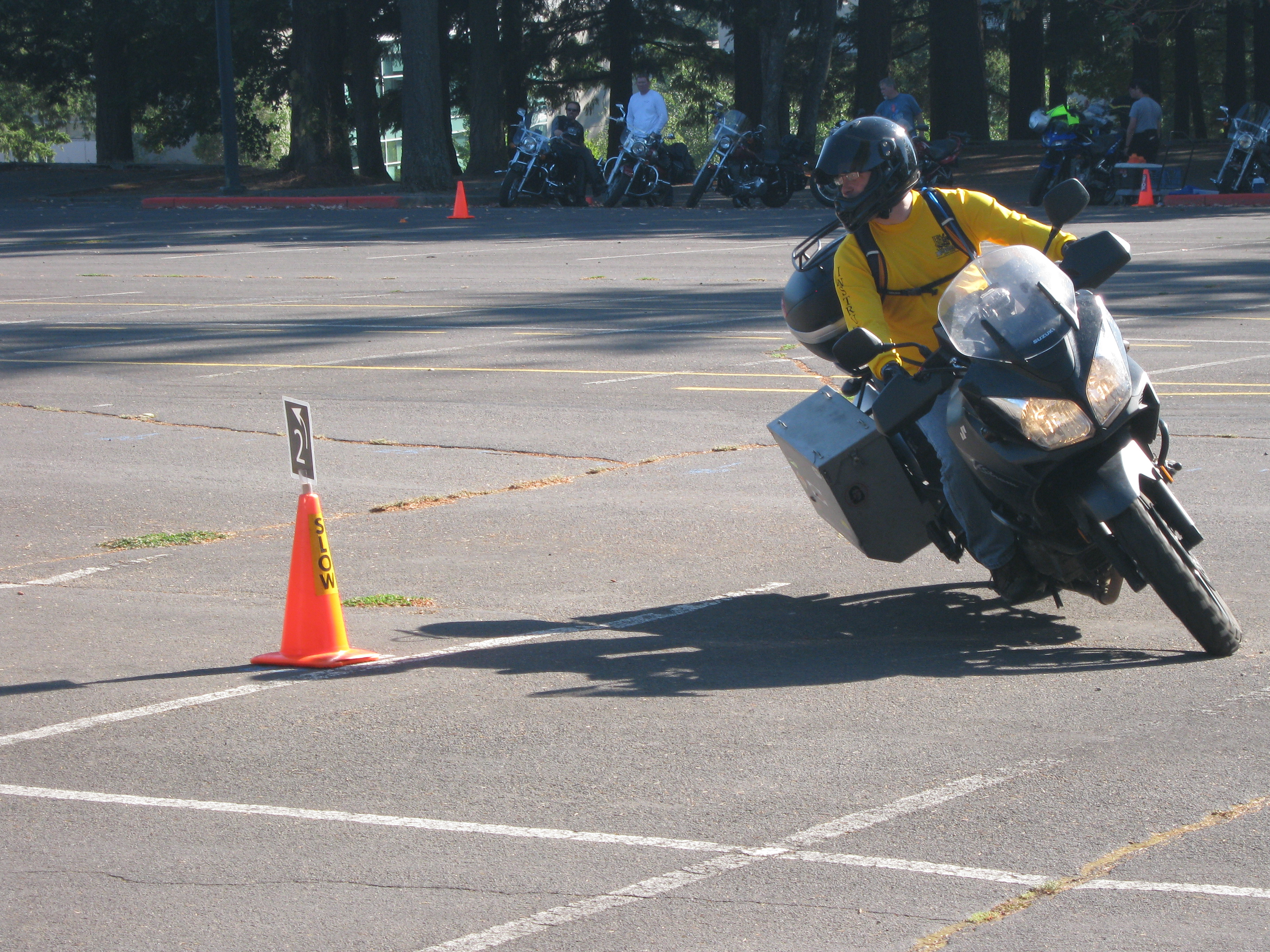
Instructor performing demo in RSP at PCC Sylvania in Portland, Oregon

As of 1993, approximately 1800 students were receiving motorcycle training per year. In 2001, 89% of 5044 students were enrolled in the 16-hour basic riding skills course. Of these students, 70% were male (versus 87% of endorsed motorcyclists), and 85% of students completed the program. Student tuition was $95, and the cost for Team Oregon to train one student was $135. As of 2008, Team Oregon was teaching 8000 students per year. In 2011, student tuition for the BRT is $179.

== Programs ==
Classes often take place in parking lots, such as those at community colleges and schools, except for the most advanced classes, which use go-kart tracks.

The Basic Rider Training (BRT) is a 15-hour course for novice riders. The course takes place over three days and provides seven hours of classroom instruction and eight hours of range (on-cycle) instruction. Training motorcycles and helmets are provided. For individuals with no riding experience, BRT is the recommended course, with 89% of all students enrolling into the BRT. It is required by law for all new riders.

The Intermediate Rider Training, known as the IRT, is a full-day training program for students 21 and over who are familiar with a motorcycle, but who need more practice, evaluation, and guidance to become comfortable and safe on the road. It consists of four hours of classroom instruction, and four hours of range (on-cycle) instruction.

As of January 1, 2013, Oregon law requires any new motorcycle endorsement applicant under age 51 to successfully complete a Team Oregon IRT or BRT class. On January 1, 2014 the age will go up to 61; and on January 1, 2015, all new endorsement applicants will need to meet the requirement. Persons moving to Oregon from out of state that already hold a motorcycle endorsement will not need to meet this requirement.

The Rider Skills Practice, known as RSP, is a half-day (5 hours) of exercises on the range to tune up rider skills. It is recommended a student have 3000 miles of recent on-road motorcycle experience.

The Advanced Rider Training, known as ART, is aimed at riders who have at least 12,000 miles of on-street riding experience. It consists of a two-hour classroom session and 4–5 hours of on-track education. Since the ART takes place on go-kart tracks in order to teach riding proficiency at higher speeds, it is only taught at Pat's Acres in Canby and in Medford.

== Results ==
Team Oregon was recognized as the "best in the nation" in a 2004 American Institutes for Research study sponsored by the National Highway Traffic Safety Administration. The study identified three "best practices" areas of program administration, rider education, and licensing. Oregon received a score of 24, versus a mean score of 14.6 with a standard deviation of 4.9.
