= Stanley Cycle Show =

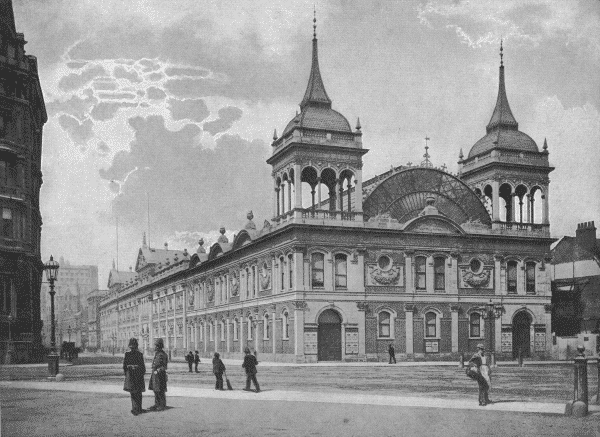
The Royal Aquarium Hall, Westminster about 1876

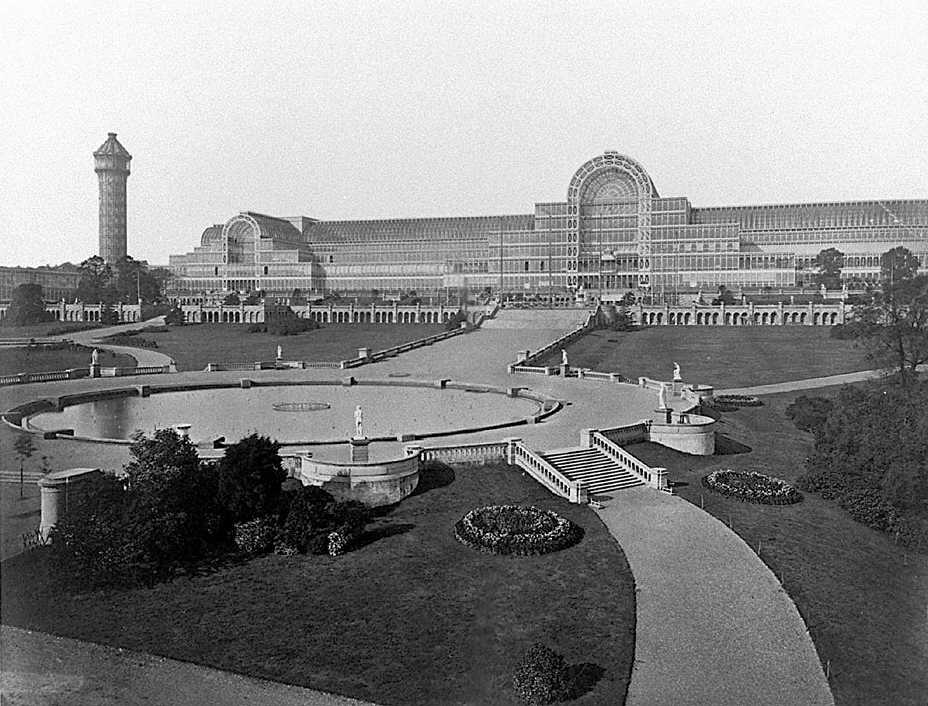
The Crystal Palace, Sydenham 1854

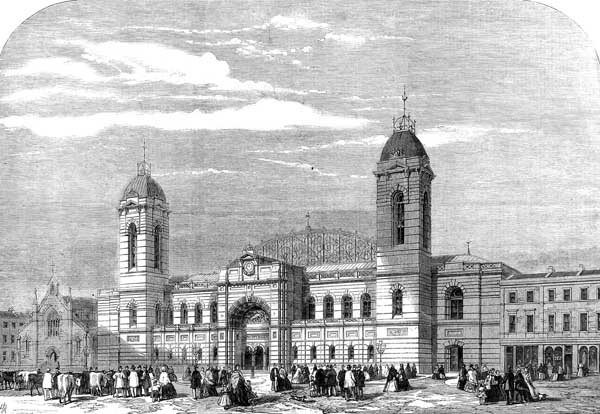
The Royal Agricultural Hall 1861, view from Liverpool Road. Now the rear entrance to the Business Design Centre

The Stanley Cycle Show or Stanley Show was an exhibition of bicycles and tricycles first mounted by the Stanley Cycling Club in 1878 at The Athenaeum in London's Camden Road. Britain's first series production cars were displayed at this show in November 1896. The 34th and last exhibition was held in the Royal Agricultural Hall, Islington in November 1910. It was supplanted by the 1911 Olympia Motor Cycle Show and, a few weeks before that, Olympia's International Motor Exhibition.

== Stanley Show Committee ==
In its first decade it was organised by the Stanley Cycling Club and held at the Royal Aquarium, Westminster specially for "the votaries of wheeling". From the 1886 exhibition it was arranged not by the Stanley Club but by a committee of manufacturers and Stanley Club members. This 1886 exhibition displayed a strong emphasis on dwarf or safety bicycles. There were signs that tandems were replacing the wider and more unwieldy sociables.

1888's display included a prominent exhibit by Coventry Machinists Company, styled a Hansom Cab Coolie Cycle. Built for the Sultan of Morocco with a full-size cab body in front, where His Majesty would be able to sit in comfort and control the steering and braking, this machine was propelled by four cyclists at the back. There were other notable displays by: Hillman Herbert & Cooper of Premier Cycles, Rudge Cycles – a bicycle for military purposes, Marriott & Cooper – a tandem, Eureka racing bicycles by Bayliss Thomas & Co. and many others including an electric tricycle and "roadscullers" using a rowing motion for propulsion.

The Stanley was always a winter show. In the summer of 1896 Harry Lawson ran a competing International Motor Exhibition at the Imperial Institute, Kensington.

== The Stanley Automobile Exhibition January 1905 ==
The Stanley Show Committee's first automobile exhibition was held at Earls Court. Opened on 15 January 1905 in very cold weather Earls Court's unheated buildings drew the comment from newspapers that it was well-attended considering the weather conditions. A month later an automobile exhibition at Olympia (the third International Exhibition of the Society of Motor Manufacturers and Traders under the auspices of the Automobile Association of Great Britain and Ireland) drew crowds that were "enormous and interested".

The Stanley Committee's last show was in November 1910.

== Olympia's International Motor Show and Motor Cycle Show ==
The Olympia Motor Cycle Show held in November 1911 supplanted the old-established Stanley Cycle Show. The new Motorcycle Show pushed forward by two weeks to the beginning of November the great International Motor Show also to be held at Olympia that month.

== Venues ==
- 1st at The Athenaeum Camden Road, 1878, 60 cycles
- 6th the Royal Albert Hall. February 1883
- 7th the Royal Floral Hall, Covent Garden, above 80 exhibitors, over 400 machines. February 1884 illuminated by Jablochkoff electric arc lights.
- 8th The Wheeleries, Thames Embankment (close to Blackfriars Bridge), February 1885
- 9th the Royal Aquarium, Westminster, February 1886
- 10th the Royal Aquarium, Westminster, 118 exhibitors, 600 machines. February 1887
- 11th the Royal Aquarium, Westminster, 160 exhibitors, 800 machines, "The Wheeleries". January 1888
- 12th the Crystal Palace Sydenham, February 1889
- 13th the Crystal Palace [Sydenham, 230 exhibitors, 1500 machines, January 1890
- 14th Crystal Palace Sydenham, 225 exhibitors, 1125 machines, January 1891. Boycott by leading manufacturers
- 15th Crystal Palace Sydenham, 312 exhibitors, 1500 machines, November 1891. Boycott by about 70 leading manufacturers
- 16th Royal Agricultural Hall Islington. November 1892
- 17th Royal Agricultural Hall Islington. November 1893
- 18th Royal Agricultural Hall Islington, November 1894
- 19th Royal Agricultural Hall Islington, November 1895
- 28th Royal Agricultural Hall Islington 300 exhibitors, 376 stands, November 1904
- 32nd Royal Agricultural Hall Islington 250 exhibitors, November 1908
- 34th Royal Agricultural Hall Islington 250 exhibitors, November 1910
