= Grand Prix de l'UVF =

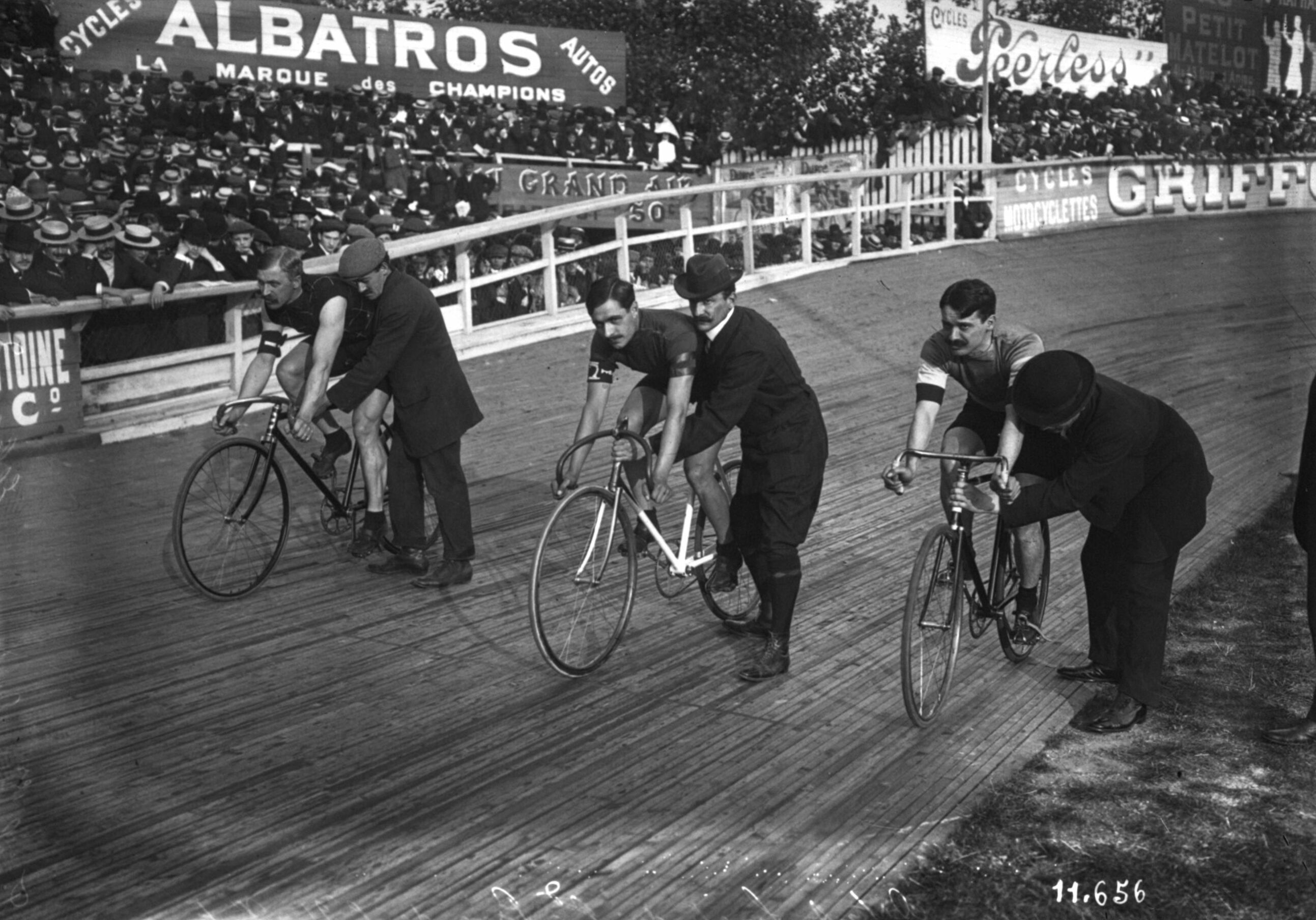
- The final of the UVF Grand Prix on October 9, 1910

Race details
- Discipline: Track
- Type: Sprint race
- Organiser: Union Vélocipédique de France

History
- First edition: 1894
- Final edition: 1945
- First winner: Arthur Augustus Zimmerman (USA)
- Most wins: Lucien Michard (FRA) (6 wins)
- Final winner: Emile Gosselin (BEL)

The Grand Prix de l'UVF was a track cycling sprint race held annually from 1894 until 1945. During this time, it was the most important competition for track sprinters alongside the UCI Track Cycling World Championships and the Grand Prix de Paris.

== Winners ==
| Year | Winner | Second | Third |
| 1894 | (United States) Arthur Augustus Zimmerman | (United States) George August Banker | (United Kingdom) Arthur Edwards |
| 1895 | (United States) George August Banker | (France) Ludovic Morin | (France) Paul Bourillon |
| 1896 | No race | | |
| 1897 | (France) Ludovic Morin | (France) Paul Masson | (France) Paul Bourillon |
| 1898 | (France) Georges Deschamps | (Belgium) Louis Grogna | (United Kingdom) David Parlby |
| 1899 | (Italy) Gian Ferdinando Tomaselli | (Belgium) Louis Grogna | (France) Jean-Baptiste Louvet |
| 1900 | (France) Jean-Pierre Domain | (United Kingdom) Tom Gascoyne | (France) Jean Mathieu |
| 1901 | (Italy) Diego Conelli | (France) Edmond Jacquelin | (Belgium) Charles-Louis Van den Born |
| 1902 | (France) Paul Bourotte | (Belgium) Louis Grogna | (Netherlands) Harrie Meyers |
| 1903 | (Denmark) Thorvald Ellegaard | (Netherlands) Harrie Meyers | (France) Charles Piard |
| 1904 | (Germany) Walter Rütt | (France) Charles Piard | (Germany) Henri Mayer |
| 1905 | (Germany) Henri Mayer | (France) Gabriel Poulain | (United States) Frank Kramer |
| 1906 | (France) Gabriel Poulain | (United States) Frank Kramer | (Germany) Henri Mayer |
| 1907 | (Denmark) Thorvald Ellegaard | (Germany) Henri Mayer | (Germany) Walter Rütt |
| 1908 | (France) Émile Friol | (Denmark) Thorvald Ellegaard | (Germany) Walter Rütt |
| 1909 | (Germany) Walter Rütt | (Denmark) Thorvald Ellegaard | (France) Victor Dupré |
| 1910 | (France) Émile Friol | (Denmark) Thorvald Ellegaard | (France) Marcel Dupuy |
| 1911 | (France) Émile Friol | (Denmark) Thorvald Ellegaard | (France) Léon Hourlier |
| 1912 (1) | (Denmark) Thorvald Ellegaard | (Italy) Cesare Moretti | (France) Victor Dupré |
| 1912 (2) | (France) Julien Pouchois | (France) Émile Friol | (France) Victor Dupré |
| 1913 | (Italy) Cesare Moretti | (France) Émile Friol | (Denmark) Thorvald Ellegaard |
| 1914–1918 | No race | | |
| 1919 | (France) Marcel Dupuy | (France) Gabriel Poulain | (France) Bertrand Casas |
| 1920 | (United Kingdom) William Bailey | (Belgium) Emile Otto | (France) Marcel Dupuy |
| 1921 | (Australia) Harris Horder | (France) Lucien Louet | (France) Fernand Fournous |
| 1922 | (Australia) Robert Spears | (Italy) Cesare Moretti | (Netherlands) Piet Moeskops |
| 1923 | (Netherlands) Piet Moeskops | (France) Lucien Michard | (Italy) Cesare Moretti |
| 1924 | (France) Lucien Michard | (Switzerland) Charles Guyot | (France) Jean Cugnot |
| 1925 | (France) Lucien Michard | (Belgium) Aloïs Degraeve | (Belgium) Emile Otto |
| 1926 | (France) Lucien Michard | (France) Maurice Schilles | (France) Lucien Faucheux |
| 1927 | (France) Lucien Faucheux | (Netherlands) Piet Moeskops | (France) Maurice Schilles |
| 1928 | (France) Lucien Michard | (France) Lucien Faucheux | (Australia) Robert Spears |
| 1929 | (Italy) Mario Bergamini | (Italy) Cesare Moretti | (Belgium) Aloïs Degraeve |
| 1930 | (Netherlands) Piet Moeskops | (France) Lucien Michard | (France) Lucien Faucheux |
| 1931 | (France) Lucien Michard | (France) Lucien Faucheux | (France) Louis Gérardin |
| 1932 | (France) Lucien Michard | (France) Louis Gérardin | (Belgium) Jef Scherens |
| 1933 | (Belgium) Jef Scherens | (France) Louis Gérardin | (France) Lucien Michard |
| 1934 | (Belgium) Jef Scherens | (France) Louis Gérardin | (France) Lucien Michard |
| 1935 | (Germany) Albert Richter | (France) Lucien Michard | (Belgium) Jef Scherens |
| 1936 | (France) Louis Gérardin | (Belgium) Jef Scherens | (Germany) Albert Richter |
| 1937 | (France) Louis Gérardin | (Germany) Albert Richter | (Belgium) Jef Scherens |
| 1938 | (Germany) Albert Richter | (Belgium) Jef Scherens | (France) Louis Chaillot |
| 1941 | (France) Louis Gérardin | — | — |
| 1942 | (Belgium) Jef Scherens | — | — |
| 1943 | (Belgium) Emile Gosselin | — | — |
| 1945 | (Belgium) Emile Gosselin | — | — |
