= UCI Track Cycling World Championships – Men's sprint =

The UCI Track Cycling World Championships – Men's sprint is the world championship sprint event held annually at the UCI Track Cycling World Championships. Between its inception and 1992, the sprint was separated into two events; one for professionals and one for amateurs. From 1993, all competitors competed in one open event. It was first held at the 1995 championships, two years after the first amateur sprint world championship. As of 2020, Koichi Nakano from Japan has won the most titles with ten consecutive professional wins between 1977 and 1986.

== Medalists ==
Championships	Winner	Runner-up	Third
1893 Chicago	Arthur Zimmerman (USA)	John S. Johnson (USA)	Julian Perrin Bliss (USA)
1894 Antwerp	August Lehr (GER)	Jaap Eden (NED)	William Broadbridge (GBR)
1895 Cologne	Robert Protin (BEL)	George A. Banker (USA)	Emile Huet (BEL)
1896 Copenhagen	Paul Bourillon (FRA)	Charley Barden (GBR)	Edmond Jacquelin (FRA)
1897 Glasgow	Willy Arend (GER)	Charley Barden (GBR)	Paul Masson (FRA)
1898 Vienna	George A. Banker (USA)	Franz Verheyen (GER)	Edmond Jacquelin (FRA)
1899 Montreal	Major Taylor (USA)	Tom Butler (USA)	Gaston Courbe D'outrelon (FRA)
1900 Paris	Edmond Jacquelin (FRA)	Harie Meyers (NED)	Willy Arend (GER)
1901 Berlin	Thorvald Ellegaard (DEN)	Edmond Jacquelin (FRA)	Guus Schilling (NED)
1902 Rome	Thorvald Ellegaard (DEN)	Harie Meyers (NED)	Pietro Bixio (ITA)
1903 Copenhagen	Thorvald Ellegaard (DEN)	Willi Arend (GER)	Harie Meyers (NED)
1904 London	Iver Lawson (USA)	Thorvald Ellegaard (DEN)	Henri Mayer (GER)
1905 Antwerp	Gabriel Poulain (FRA)	Thorvald Ellegaard (DEN)	Henri Mayer (GER)
1906 Genève	Thorvald Ellegaard (DEN)	Gabriel Poulain (FRA)	Émile Friol (FRA)
1907 Paris	Émile Friol (FRA)	Henri Mayer (GER)	Walter Rütt (GER)
1908 Berlin	Thorvald Ellegaard (DEN)	Gabriel Poulain (FRA)	Charles Louis Van Den Born (BEL)
1909 Copenhagen	Victor Dupré (FRA)	Gabriel Poulain (FRA)	Walter Rütt (GER)
1910 Brussels	Émile Friol (FRA)	Thorvald Ellegaard (DEN)	Walter Rütt (GER)
1911 Rome	Thorvald Ellegaard (DEN)	Léon Hourlier (FRA)	Julien Pouchois (FRA)
1912 Newark	Frank L. Kramer (USA)	Alfred Grenda (AUS)	André Perchicot (FRA)
1913 Leipzig	Walter Rütt (GER)	Thorvald Ellegaard (DEN)	André Perchicot (FRA)
1920 Antwerp	Bob Spears (AUS)	Ernst Kaufmann (SUI)	William Bailey (GBR)
1921 Copenhagen	Piet Moeskops (NED)	Bob Spears (AUS)	Pierre Sergent (FRA)
1922 Paris	Piet Moeskops (NED)	Bob Spears (AUS)	Alois Degraeve (BEL)
1923 Zürich	Piet Moeskops (NED)	Gabriel Poulain (FRA)	Ernst Kaufmann (SUI)
1924 Paris	Piet Moeskops (NED)	Ernst Kaufmann (SUI)	Maurice Schilles (FRA)
1925 Amsterdam	Ernst Kaufmann (SUI)	Maurice Schilles (FRA)	Lucien Michard (FRA)
1926 Milan	Piet Moeskops (NED)	César Moretti (ITA)	Lucien Michard (FRA)
1927 Cologne	Lucien Michard (FRA)	Ernst Kaufmann (SUI)	Lucien Faucheux (FRA)
1928 Budapest	Lucien Michard (FRA)	Lucien Faucheux (FRA)	Ernst Kaufmann (FRA)
1929 Zürich	Lucien Michard (FRA)	Piet Moeskops (NED)	Ernst Kaufmann (SUI)
1930 Brussels	Lucien Michard (FRA)	Piet Moeskops (NED)	Orlando Piani (ITA)
1931 Copenhagen	Willy Falck Hansen (DEN)	Lucien Michard (FRA)	Jef Scherens (BEL)
1932 Rome	Jef Scherens (BEL)	Lucien Michard (FRA)	Mathias Engel (GER)
1933 Paris	Jef Scherens (BEL)	Lucien Michard (FRA)	Albert Richter (GER)
1934 Leipzig	Jef Scherens (BEL)	Albert Richter (GER)	Louis Gérardin (FRA)
1935 Brussels	Jef Scherens (BEL)	Albert Richter (GER)	Louis Gérardin (FRA)
1936 Zürich	Jef Scherens (BEL)	Louis Gérardin (FRA)	Albert Richter (GER)
1937 Copenhagen	Jef Scherens (BEL)	Arie Van Vliet (NED)	Albert Richter (GER)
1938 Amsterdam	Arie Van Vliet (NED)	Jef Scherens (BEL)	Albert Richter (GER)
1939 Milan	Not awarded	Not awarded	Albert Richter (GER)
1946 Zürich	Jan Derksen (NED)	Georges Senfftleben (FRA)	Arie Van Vliet (NED)
1947 Paris	Jef Scherens (BEL)	Louis Gérardin (FRA)	Georges Senfftleben (FRA)
1948 Amsterdam	Arie Van Vliet (NED)	Louis Gérardin (FRA)	Georges Senfftleben (FRA)
1949 Copenhagen	Reg Harris (GBR)	Jan Derksen (NED)	Arie Van Vliet (NED)
1950 Rocourt	Reg Harris (GBR)	Arie Van Vliet (NED)	Jan Derksen (NED)
1951 Milan	Reg Harris (GBR)	Jacques Bellenger (FRA)	Sid Patterson (AUS)
1952 Paris	Oscar Plattner (SUI)	Georges Senfftleben (FRA)	Jan Derksen (NED)
1953 Zürich	Arie Van Vliet (NED)	Enzo Sacchi (ITA)	Reg Harris (GBR)
1954 Cologne	Reg Harris (GBR)	Arie Van Vliet (NED)	Enzo Sacchi (ITA)
1955 Milan	Antonio Maspes (ITA)	Oscar Plattner (SUI)	Arie Van Vliet (NED)
1956 Copenhagen	Antonio Maspes (ITA)	Reg Harris (GBR)	Oscar Plattner (SUI)
1957 Rocourt	Jan Derksen (NED)	Arie Van Vliet (NED)	Roger Gaignard (FRA)
1958 Paris	Michel Rousseau (FRA)	Enzo Sacchi (ITA)	Antonio Maspes (ITA)
1959 Amsterdam	Antonio Maspes (ITA)	Michel Rousseau (FRA)	Jan Derksen (NED)
1960 Leipzig	Antonio Maspes (ITA)	Oscar Plattner (SUI)	Jos De Bakker (BEL)
1961 Zürich	Antonio Maspes (ITA)	Michel Rousseau (FRA)	Jos De Bakker (BEL)
1962 Milan	Antonio Maspes (ITA)	Sante Gaiardoni (ITA)	Oscar Plattner (SUI)
1963 Rocourt	Sante Gaiardoni (ITA)	Antonio Maspes (ITA)	Jos De Bakker (BEL)
1964 Paris	Antonio Maspes (ITA)	Ron Baensch (AUS)	Jos De Bakker (BEL)
1965 San Sebastián	Giuseppe Beghetto (ITA)	Patrick Sercu (BEL)	Ron Baensch (AUS)
1966 Frankfurt	Giuseppe Beghetto (ITA)	Ron Baensch (AUS)	Sante Gaiardoni (ITA)
1967 Amsterdam	Patrick Sercu (BEL)	Giuseppe Beghetto (ITA)	Angelo Damiano (ITA)
1968 Rome	Giuseppe Beghetto (ITA)	Patrick Sercu (BEL)	Giovanni Pettenella (ITA)
1969 Antwerp	Patrick Sercu (BEL)	Robert Van Lancker (BEL)	Sante Gaiardoni (ITA)
1970 Leicester	Gordon Johnson (AUS)	Sante Gaiardoni (ITA)	Leijn Loevesijn (NED)
1971 Varese	Leijn Loevesijn (NED)	Robert Van Lancker (BEL)	Giordano Turrini (ITA)
1972 Marseille	Robert Van Lancker (BEL)	Gordon Johnson (AUS)	Giordano Turrini (ITA)
1973 San Sebastián	Robert Van Lancker (BEL)	Giordano Turrini (ITA)	Ezio Cardi (ITA)
1974 Montreal	Peder Pedersen (DEN)	John Nicholson (AUS)	Robert Van Lancker (BEL)
1975 Rocourt	John Nicholson (AUS)	Peder Pedersen (DEN)	Ryoij Abe (阿部良二) (JPN)
1976 Monteroni di Lecce	John Nicholson (AUS)	Giordano Turrini (ITA)	Yoshikazu Sugata (菅田順和) (JPN)
1977 San Cristóbal	Koichi Nakano (JPN)	Yoshikazu Sugata (菅田順和) (JPN)	John Nicholson (AUS)
1978 Munich	Koichi Nakano (JPN)	Dieter Berkmann (FRG)	Yoshikazu Sugata (菅田順和) (JPN)
1979 Amsterdam	Koichi Nakano (JPN)	Dieter Berkmann (FRG)	Michel Vaarten (BEL)
1980 Besançon	Koichi Nakano (JPN)	Masahiko Ozaki (尾崎雅彦) (JPN)	Daniel Morelon (FRA)
1981 Brno	Koichi Nakano (JPN)	Gordon Singleton (CAN)	Kenji Takahashi (高橋健二) (JPN)
1982 Leicester	Koichi Nakano (JPN)	Gordon Singleton (CAN)	Yavé Cahard (FRA)
1983 Zürich	Koichi Nakano (JPN)	Yavé Cahard (FRA)	Ottavio Dazzan (ITA)
1984 Barcelona	Koichi Nakano (JPN)	Ottavio Dazzan (ITA)	Yavé Cahard (FRA)
1985 Bassano del Grappa	Koichi Nakano (JPN)	Yoshiyuki Matsueda (松枝義幸) (JPN)	Ottavio Dazzan (ITA)
1986 Colorado Springs	Koichi Nakano (JPN)	Hideyuki Matsui (松井英幸) (JPN)	Nobuyuki Tawara (JPN)
1987 Vienna	Nobuyuki Tawara (JPN)	Hideyuki Matsui (松井英幸) (JPN)	Claudio Golinelli (ITA)
1988 Ghent	Stephen Pate (AUS)	Medal not awarded	Nobuyuki Tawara (JPN)
1989 Lyon	Claudio Golinelli (ITA)	Yuichiro Kamiyama (JPN)	Hideyuki Matsui (松井英幸) (JPN)
1990 Maebashi	Michael Hübner (GER)	Claudio Golinelli (ITA)	Stephen Pate (AUS)
1991 Stuttgart	Medal not awarded	Fabrice Colas (FRA)	Medal not awarded
1992 Valencia	Michael Hübner (GER)	Frédéric Magné (FRA)	Eric Schoefs (BEL)
1993 Hamar	Gary Neiwand (AUS)	Michael Hübner (GER)	Eyk Pokorny (GER)
1994 Palermo	Marty Nothstein (USA)	Darryn Hill (AUS)	Michael Hübner (GER)
1995 Bogotá	Darryn Hill (AUS)	Curt Harnett (CAN)	Frédéric Magné (FRA)
1996 Manchester	Florian Rousseau (FRA)	Marty Nothstein (USA)	Darryn Hill (AUS)
1997 Perth	Florian Rousseau (FRA)	Jens Fiedler (GER)	Darryn Hill (AUS)
1998 Bordeaux	Florian Rousseau (FRA)	Jens Fiedler (GER)	Laurent Gané (FRA)
1999 Berlin	Laurent Gané (FRA)	Jens Fiedler (GER)	Florian Rousseau (FRA)
2000 Manchester	Jan van Eijden (GER)	Laurent Gané (FRA)	Medal not awarded
2001 Antwerp	Arnaud Tournant (FRA)	Laurent Gané (FRA)	Florian Rousseau (FRA)
2002 Ballerup	Sean Eadie (AUS)	Jobie Dajka (AUS)	Florian Rousseau (FRA)
2003 Stuttgart	Laurent Gané (FRA)	Jobie Dajka (AUS)	René Wolff (GER)
2004 Melbourne	Theo Bos (NED)	Laurent Gané (FRA)	Ryan Bayley (AUS)
2005 Los Angeles	René Wolff (GER)	Mickaël Bourgain (FRA)	Jobie Dajka (AUS)
2006 Bordeaux	Theo Bos (NED)	Craig MacLean (GBR)	Stefan Nimke (GER)
2007 Palma de Mallorca	Theo Bos (NED)	Grégory Baugé (FRA)	Mickaël Bourgain (FRA)
2008 Manchester	Chris Hoy (GBR)	Kévin Sireau (FRA)	Mickaël Bourgain (FRA)
2009 Pruszków	Grégory Baugé (FRA)	Azizul Hasni Awang (MAS)	Kévin Sireau (FRA)
2010 Ballerup	Grégory Baugé (FRA)	Shane Perkins (AUS)	Kévin Sireau (FRA)
2011 Apeldoorn (Note: France's Grégory Baugé originally won the gold medal, but was stripped of that title in January 2012, with the other riders in the final round promoted to the respective medal positions.)	Jason Kenny (GBR)	Chris Hoy (GBR)	Mickaël Bourgain (FRA)
2012 Melbourne	Grégory Baugé (FRA)	Jason Kenny (GBR)	Chris Hoy (GBR)
2013 Minsk	Stefan Bötticher (GER)	Denis Dmitriev (RUS)	François Pervis (FRA)
2014 Cali	François Pervis (FRA)	Stefan Bötticher (GER)	Denis Dmitriev (RUS)
2015 Yvelines	Grégory Baugé (FRA)	Denis Dmitriev (RUS)	Quentin Lafargue (FRA)
2016 London	Jason Kenny (GBR)	Matthew Glaetzer (AUS)	Denis Dmitriev (RUS)
2017 Hong Kong	Denis Dmitriev (RUS)	Harrie Lavreysen (NED)	Ethan Mitchell (NZL)
2018 Apeldoorn	Matthew Glaetzer (AUS)	Jack Carlin (GBR)	Sebastien Vigier (FRA)
2019 Pruszków	Harrie Lavreysen (NED)	Jeffrey Hoogland (NED)	Mateusz Rudyk (POL)
2020 Berlin	Harrie Lavreysen (NED)	Jeffrey Hoogland (NED)	Azizulhasni Awang (MAS)
2021 Roubaix	Harrie Lavreysen (NED)	Jeffrey Hoogland (NED)	Sébastien Vigier (FRA)
2022 Saint-Quentin-en-Yvelines	Harrie Lavreysen (NED)	Matthew Richardson (AUS)	Matthew Glaetzer (AUS)
2023 Glasgow	Harrie Lavreysen (NED)	Nicholas Paul (TTO)	Jack Carlin (GBR)
2024 Ballerup	Harrie Lavreysen (NED)	Jeffrey Hoogland (NED)	Kaiya Ota (JPN)
2025 Santiago	Harrie Lavreysen (NED)	Matthew Richardson (GBR)	Leigh Hoffman (AUS)
2026 Shanghai	Harrie Lavreysen (NED)	Leigh Hoffman (AUS)	Kaiya Ota (JPN)

== Medal table ==
Rank	Nation	Gold	Silver	Bronze	Total
1	France	22	28	35	85
2	Netherlands	22	14	9	45
3	Italy	12	11	14	37
4	Belgium	12	5	11	28
5	Japan	11	6	9	26
6	Australia	9	14	10	33
7	Denmark	8	5	0	13
8	Germany	7	10	15	32
9	Great Britain	7	8	4	19
10	United States	5	3	0	8
11	Switzerland	2	5	4	11
12	Russia	1	2	2	5
13	Canada	0	3	0	3
14	West Germany	0	2	0	2
15	Malaysia	0	1	1	2
16	Trinidad and Tobago	0	1	0	1
17	New Zealand	0	0	1	1
17	Poland	0	0	1	1
Totals (18 entries)		118	118	116	352

== See also ==
- Keirin
- UCI Track Cycling World Championships – Women's sprint
- Track cycling at the Summer Olympics – Men's sprint
