= Grand Prix de Paris (cycling) =

Former cycling event

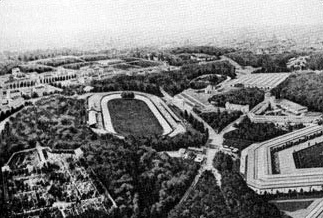
- The Bois de Vincennes velodrome hosted the Paris Grand Prix for nearly a hundred years.

Race details
- Discipline: Track
- Type: Sprint race

History
- First edition: 1894
- Final edition: 1993
- First winner: George A. Banker (USA)
- Final winner: Michael Hübner (GER)

The Grand Prix de Paris was a track cycling sprint race held annually from 1894 until 1993. It was the most important competition for track sprinters alongside the UCI Track Cycling World Championships and the Grand Prix de l'UVF.

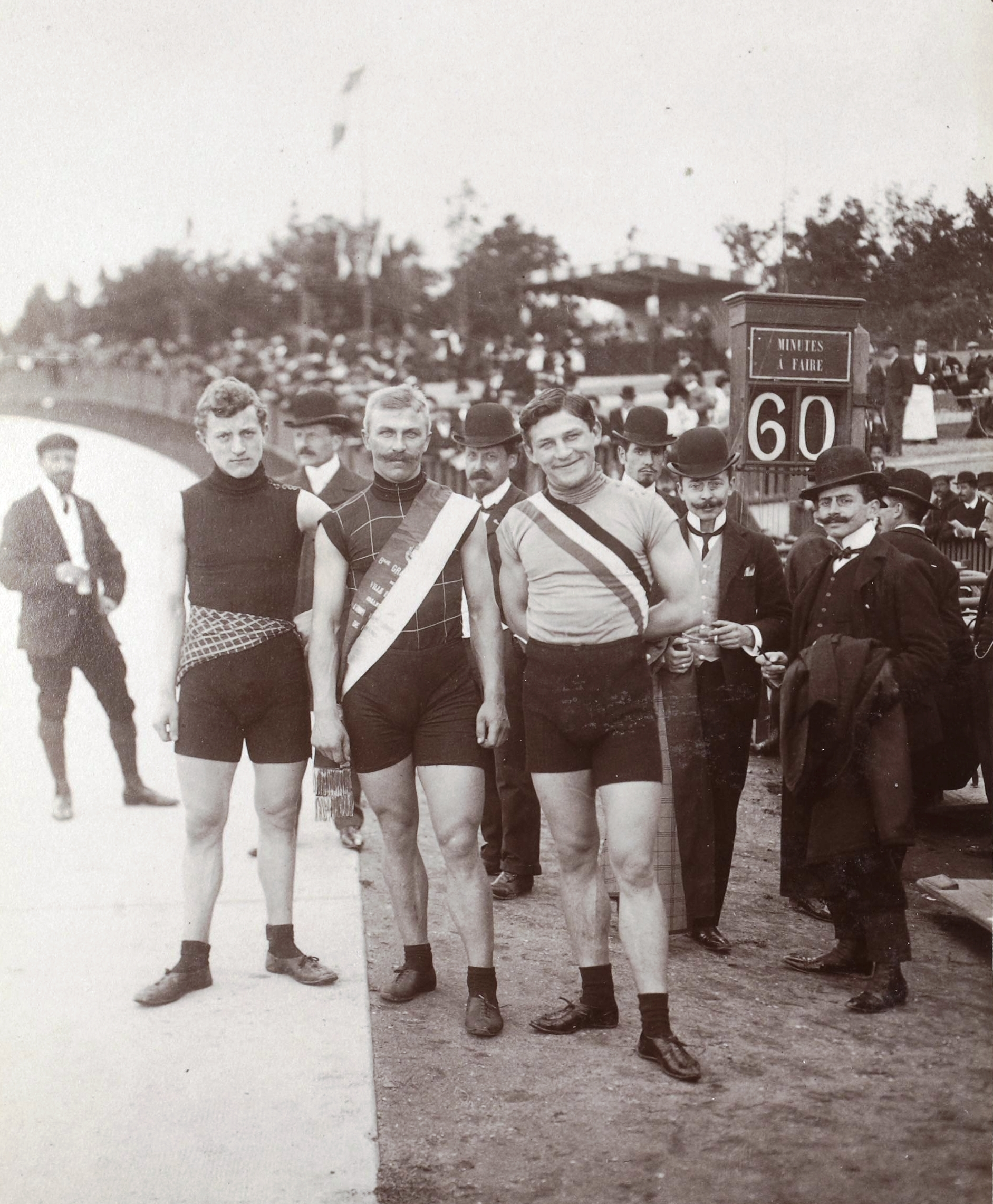
The podium of the 1901 edition. From left to right: Walter Rütt, Thorvald Ellegaard and Willy Arend.

== Winners ==
=== Men ===
==== Professional ====
- 1894: (United States) George A. Banker
- 1895: (France) Ludovic Morin
- 1896: (France) Ludovic Morin
- 1897: (France) Ludovic Morin
- 1898: (France) Paul Bourrillon
- 1899: (Italy) Gian Ferdinando Tomaselli
- 1900: (France) Edmond Jacquelin
- 1901: (Denmark) Thorvald Ellegaard
- 1902: (Netherlands) Harie Meyers
- 1903: (Netherlands) Harie Meyers
- 1904: (Germany) Henri Mayer
- 1905: (United States) Frank Kramer
- 1906: (United States) Frank Kramer
- 1907: (France) Émile Friol
- 1908: (France) Julien Pouchois
- 1909: (France) Émile Friol
- 1910: (France) Émile Friol
- 1911: (Denmark) Thorvald Ellegaard
- 1912: (France) Léon Hourlier
- 1913: (Germany) Walter Rütt
- 1914: (France) Léon Hourlier
- 1920: (Australia) Robert Spears
- 1921: (Australia) Robert Spears
- 1922: (Australia) Robert Spears
- 1923: (Switzerland) Ernest Kauffmann
- 1924: (France) Maurice Schilles
- 1925: (France) Maurice Schilles
- 1926: (France) Lucien Faucheux
- 1927: (Switzerland) Ernest Kauffmann
- 1928: (France) Lucien Faucheux
- 1929: (France) Lucien Faucheux
- 1930: (France) Lucien Michard
- 1931: (France) Lucien Michard
- 1932: (Belgium) Jef Scherens
- 1933: (Belgium) Jef Scherens
- 1934: (Germany) Albert Richter
- 1935: (France) Lucien Michard
- 1936: (France) Lucien Michard
- 1937: (Belgium) Jef Scherens
- 1938: (Germany) Albert Richter
- 1939: (France) Louis Gérardin
- 1941: (France) Louis Gérardin
- 1942: (Netherlands) Arie van Vliet
- 1943: (France) Louis Gérardin
- 1944: (France) Georges Senfftleben
- 1945: (France) Marc Cautenet
- 1946: (Netherlands) Arie van Vliet
- 1947: (Netherlands) Arie van Vliet
- 1948: (Netherlands) Arie van Vliet
- 1949: (Netherlands) Arie van Vliet
- 1950: (Netherlands) Jan Derksen
- 1951: (United Kingdom) Reginald Harris
- 1952: (Australia) Russell Mockridge
- 1953: (Switzerland) Oscar Plattner
- 1954: (Italy) Enzo Sacchi
- 1956: (United Kingdom) Reginald Harris
- 1957: (Belgium) Jos De Bakker
- 1958: (Netherlands) Jan Derksen
- 1959: (Italy) Enzo Sacchi
- 1960: (Italy) Antonio Maspes
- 1961: (Italy) Antonio Maspes
- 1962: (Italy) Antonio Maspes
- 1963: (Italy) Antonio Maspes
- 1964: (Italy) Antonio Maspes
- 1965: (France) Daniel Morelon
- 1967: (France) Daniel Morelon
- 1968: (Italy) Giuseppe Beghetto
- 1969: (France) Pierre Trentin
- 1975: (Italy) Giorgio Rossi
- 1976: (France) Alex Pontet
- 1977: (France) Daniel Morelon
- 1978: (East Germany) Lutz Heßlich
- 1979: (East Germany) Lutz Heßlich
- 1980: (France) Yvon Cloarec
- 1981: (Soviet Union) Sergey Kopylov
- 1982: (East Germany) Michael Hübner
- 1983: (East Germany) Lutz Heßlich
- 1984: (Soviet Union) Sergey Kopylov
- 1985: (East Germany) Lutz Heßlich
- 1986: (East Germany) Bill Huck
- 1987: (East Germany) Lutz Heßlich
- 1988: (East Germany) Lutz Heßlich
- 1989: (East Germany) Michael Hübner
- 1990: (East Germany) Michael Hübner
- 1991: (Germany) Bill Huck
- 1993: (Germany) Michael Hübner

==== Amateur ====
- 1898: (United Kingdom) Mille
- 1899: (France) Grognet
- 1900: (France) Georges Taillandier
- 1901: (France) Charles Piard
- 1902: (France) Charles Piard
- 1903: (Italy) Agostino Granaglia
- 1904: (United Kingdom) Arthur L. Reed
- 1905: (United Kingdom) Jimmy S. Benyon
- 1906: (Italy) Francesco Verri
- 1907: (France) André Auffray
- 1908: (France) Émile Demangel
- 1909: (France) Maurice Schilles
- 1910: (United Kingdom) William Bailey
- 1911: (United Kingdom) William Bailey
- 1912: (United Kingdom) William Bailey
- 1913: (United Kingdom) William Bailey
- 1914: (France) Henri Bellivier
- 1920: (Netherlands) Maurice Peeters
- 1921: (France) Henri Bellivier
- 1922: (France) Lucien Michard
- 1923: (France) Jean Cugnot
- 1924: (France) Lucien Michard
- 1925: (France) L. Revelly
- 1926: (Germany) Mathias Engel
- 1927: (Germany) Mathias Engel
- 1928: (France) Roger Beaufrand
- 1929: (United Kingdom) Sydney Cozens
- 1930: (United Kingdom) Sydney Cozens
- 1931: (United Kingdom) Sydney Cozens
- 1932: (Germany) Albert Richter
- 1933: (France) Marcel Jezo
- 1934: (Germany) Toni Merkens
- 1935: (Germany) Toni Merkens
- 1936: (France) Jacques Avram
- 1937: (Italy) Benedetto Pola
- 1938: (France) Guy Renaudin
- 1939: (Netherlands) Jan Derksen
- 1943: (France) Marcel Etienne
- 1944: (France) Jacques Lohmuller
- 1945: (France) Marcel Etienne
- 1946: (United Kingdom) Reginald Harris
- 1947: (France) René Faye
- 1948: (France) Émile Lognay
- 1949: (France) Émile Lognay
- 1950: (France) Maurice Verdeun
- 1951: (Italy) Enzo Sacchi
- 1952: (Australia) Russell Mockridge
- 1953: (Australia) Russell Mockridge
- 1954: (United Kingdom) Cyril Peacock
- 1955: (Australia) John Tressider
- 1956: (France) Michel Rousseau
- 1957: (Italy) Guglielmo Pesenti
- 1958: (Italy) Valentino Gasparella
- 1959: (Italy) Valentino Gasparella
- 1960: (Italy) Sante Gaiardoni
- 1961: (Italy) Giuseppe Beghetto
- 1962: (France) André Gruchet
- 1963: (France) Pierre Trentin
- 1964: (France) Pierre Trentin
- 1965: (France) Pierre Trentin
- 1966: (Italy) Angelo Bruno
- 1967: (France) Pierre Trentin
- 1968: (Italy) Giuseppe Beghetto
- 1969: (France) Pierre Trentin
- 1970: (France) Daniel Morelon
- 1971: (France) Daniel Morelon
- 1974: (France) Pierre Trentin

=== Women ===
- 1982: (France) Isabelle Gautheron
- 1983: (West Germany) Claudia Lommatzsch
- 1984: (France) Sandrine Lestrade
- 1985: (France) Isabelle Gautheron
- 1986: (France) Isabelle Nicoloso
- 1987: (Soviet Union) Nathalia Krushelnitskaya
- 1988: (Soviet Union) Erika Salumäe
- 1989: (Soviet Union) Galina Tsareva
- 1990: (East Germany) Annett Neumann
- 1991: (France) Félicia Ballanger
- 1993: (Canada) Tanya Dubnicoff
