= 1907 UCI Track Cycling World Championships =

Bike contest

- Venue: Paris, France
- Date: 4–7 July 1907
- Velodrome: Parc des Princes
- Events: 4

The 1907 UCI Track Cycling World Championships were the World Championship for track cycling. They took place in Paris, France from 4 to 7 July 1907. Four events for men were contested, two of which were professionals and the other two for the amateurs.

== Medal summary ==
Event	Gold	Silver	Bronze
Men's Professional Events
Men's sprint	Émile Friol; France	Henri Mayer; Germany	Walter Rütt; Germany
Men's motor-paced	Louis Darragon; France	Karel Verbist; Belgium	Georges Parent; France
Men's Amateur Events
Men's sprint	Jean Devoissoux; France	André Auffray; France	Camille Avrillon; France
Men's motor-paced	Leon Meredith; Great Britain	Victor Tubbax; Belgium	Maurice Brocco; France

== Participants ==
Netherlands
Dorus Nijland (amateur sprint)
Jan Tulleken

== Medal table ==
Rank	Nation	Gold	Silver	Bronze	Total
1	France (FRA)	3	1	3	7
2	Great Britain (GBR)	1	0	0	1
3	Belgium (BEL)	0	2	0	2
4	Germany (GER)	0	1	1	2
Totals (4 entries)		4	4	4	12
