= 1929 UCI Road World Championships =

- Venue: Zürich, Switzerland
- Date: 16 August 1929
- Coordinates: 47°22′28″N 08°32′28″E
- Events: 2

The 1929 UCI Road World Championships, organized on Friday 16 August 1929, was the ninth edition of the UCI Road World Championships.

It was the second time the championships took place in Zürich, Switzerland after the 1923 edition.

The course, with Zürich as both start and finish place, was around 200km. All 16 professional cyclists finished, with Georges Ronsse -succeeding himself as world champion- reaching an average speed of 29.405 km/h.

In the same period, the 1929 UCI Track Cycling World Championships was organized in the Oerlikon Velodrome in Zürich.

== Events summary ==
Event	Gold		Silver		Bronze	
Men's Events
Professional Road Race	Georges Ronsse; Belgium	6h 48' 05"	Nicolas Frantz; Luxembourg	s.t.	Alfredo Binda; Italy	s.t.
Amateur Road Race	Piero Bertolazzo; Italy	-	Remo Bertoni; Italy	-	René Brossy; France	-

== See also ==
- 1929 UCI Track Cycling World Championships
