= 1924 UCI Track Cycling World Championships =

- Venue: Paris, France
- Date: 3–10 August 1924
- Velodrome: Parc des Princes
- Events: 3

The 1924 UCI Track Cycling World Championships were the World Championship for track cycling. They took place in Paris, France from 3 to 10 August 1924. Three events for men were contested, two for professionals and one for amateurs.

== Medal summary ==
Event	Gold	Silver	Bronze
Men's Professional Events
Men's sprint	Piet Moeskops; Netherlands	Ernest Kauffmann; Switzerland	Maurice Schilles; France
Men's motor-paced	Victor Linart; Belgium	Georges Sérès; France	Leopoldo Torricelli; Italy
Men's Amateur Events
Men's sprint	Lucien Michard; France	Lucien Faucheux; France	Henry F. Fuller; Great Britain

== Medal table ==
Rank	Nation	Gold	Silver	Bronze	Total
1	France (FRA)	1	2	1	4
2	Belgium (BEL)	1	0	0	1
2	Netherlands (NED)	1	0	0	1
4	Switzerland (SUI)	0	1	0	1
5	Great Britain (GBR)	0	0	1	1
5	Italy (ITA)	0	0	1	1
Totals (6 entries)		3	3	3	9

== See also ==
- 1924 UCI Road World Championships
