= 1906 UCI Track Cycling World Championships =

Cycling competition

- Venue: Geneva, Switzerland
- Date: 29 July - 5 August 1906
- Velodrome: Velodrome de La Jonction
- Events: 4

The 1906 UCI Track Cycling World Championships were the World Championship for track cycling. They took place in Geneva, Switzerland from 29 July to 5 August 1906. Four events for men were contested, two for professionals and two for amateurs.

== Medal summary ==
Event	Gold	Silver	Bronze
Men's Professional Events
Men's sprint	Thorvald Ellegaard; Denmark	Gabriel Poulain; France	Émile Friol; France
Men's motor-paced	Louis Darragon; France	Arthur Vanderstuyft; Belgium	Jules Schwitzgubel; Switzerland
Men's Amateur Events
Men's sprint	Francesco Verri; Italy	Émile Delage; France	Dario Rondelli; France
Men's motor-paced	Maurice Bardonneau; France	Victor Tubbax; Belgium	Émile Eigeldinger; France

== Medal table ==
Rank	Nation	Gold	Silver	Bronze	Total
1	France (FRA)	2	2	3	7
2	Denmark (DEN)	1	0	0	1
2	Italy (ITA)	1	0	0	1
4	Belgium (BEL)	0	2	0	2
5	Switzerland (SUI)	0	0	1	1
Totals (5 entries)		4	4	4	12

== See also ==
- Cycling at the 1906 Intercalated Games
