= 1927 UCI Track Cycling World Championships =

- Venue: Cologne and Elberfeld, Germany
- Date: 17–24 July 1927
- Velodrome: Müngersdorf velodrome Stadion am Zoo
- Events: 3

The 1927 UCI Track Cycling World Championships were the World Championship for track cycling. They took place in Cologne and Elberfeld, Germany from 17–24 July 1927. Three events for men were contested, two for professionals and one for amateurs.

== Medal summary ==
Event	Gold	Silver	Bronze
Men's Professional Events
Men's sprint	Lucien Michard; France	Ernest Kauffmann; Switzerland	Lucien Faucheux; France
Men's motor-paced	Victor Linart; Belgium	Paul Krewer; Germany	Walter Sawall; Germany
Men's Amateur Events
Men's sprint	Mathias Engel; Germany	Willy Falck Hansen; Denmark	Peter Steffes; Germany

== Medal table ==
Rank	Nation	Gold	Silver	Bronze	Total
1	Germany (GER)	1	1	2	4
2	France (FRA)	1	0	1	2
3	Belgium (BEL)	1	0	0	1
4	Denmark (DEN)	0	1	0	1
4	Switzerland (SUI)	0	1	0	1
Totals (5 entries)		3	3	3	9

== See also ==
- 1927 UCI Road World Championships
