= 1928 UCI Track Cycling World Championships =

- Venue: Budapest, Hungary
- Date: 11–18 August 1928
- Velodrome: Millenáris Sporttelep
- Events: 3

The 1928 UCI Track Cycling World Championships were the World Championship for track cycling. They took place in Budapest, Hungary from 11 to 18 August 1928. Three events for men were contested, two for professionals and one for amateurs.

== Medal summary ==
Event	Gold	Silver	Bronze
Men's Professional Events
Men's sprint	Lucien Michard; France	Lucien Faucheux; France	Ernest Kauffmann; Switzerland
Men's motor-paced	Walter Sawall; Germany	Henri Bréau; France	Victor Linart; Belgium
Men's Amateur Events
Men's sprint	Willy Falck Hansen; Denmark	Roger Beaufrand; France	Jack Standen; Australia

== Medal table ==
Rank	Nation	Gold	Silver	Bronze	Total
1	France (FRA)	1	3	0	4
2	Denmark (DEN)	1	0	0	1
2	Germany (GER)	1	0	0	1
4	Australia (AUS)	0	0	1	1
4	Belgium (BEL)	0	0	1	1
4	Switzerland (SUI)	0	0	1	1
Totals (6 entries)		3	3	3	9

== See also ==
- 1928 UCI Road World Championships
