= 1925 UCI Track Cycling World Championships =

- Venue: Amsterdam, Netherlands
- Date: 3–10 August 1925
- Velodrome: Olympisch Stadion
- Events: 3

The 1925 UCI Track Cycling World Championships were the World Championship for track cycling. They took place in Amsterdam, Netherlands from 3 to 10 August 1925. Three events for men were contested, two for professionals and one for amateurs.

== Medal summary ==
Event	Gold	Silver	Bronze
Men's Professional Events
Men's sprint	Ernest Kauffmann; Switzerland	Maurice Schilles; France	Lucien Michard; France
Men's motor-paced	Robert Grassin; France	Jan Snoek; Netherlands	Georges Sérès; France
Men's Amateur Events
Men's sprint	Jaap Meijer; Netherlands	Antoine Mazairac; Netherlands	Bernard Leene; Netherlands

== Medal table ==
Rank	Nation	Gold	Silver	Bronze	Total
1	Netherlands (NED)	1	2	1	4
2	France (FRA)	1	1	2	4
3	Switzerland (SUI)	1	0	0	1
Totals (3 entries)		3	3	3	9

== See also ==
- 1925 UCI Road World Championships
