= 1921 UCI Track Cycling World Championships =

Cycling competition

- Venue: Copenhagen, Denmark
- Date: 30 July - 8 August 1921
- Velodrome: Ordrupbanen
- Events: 3

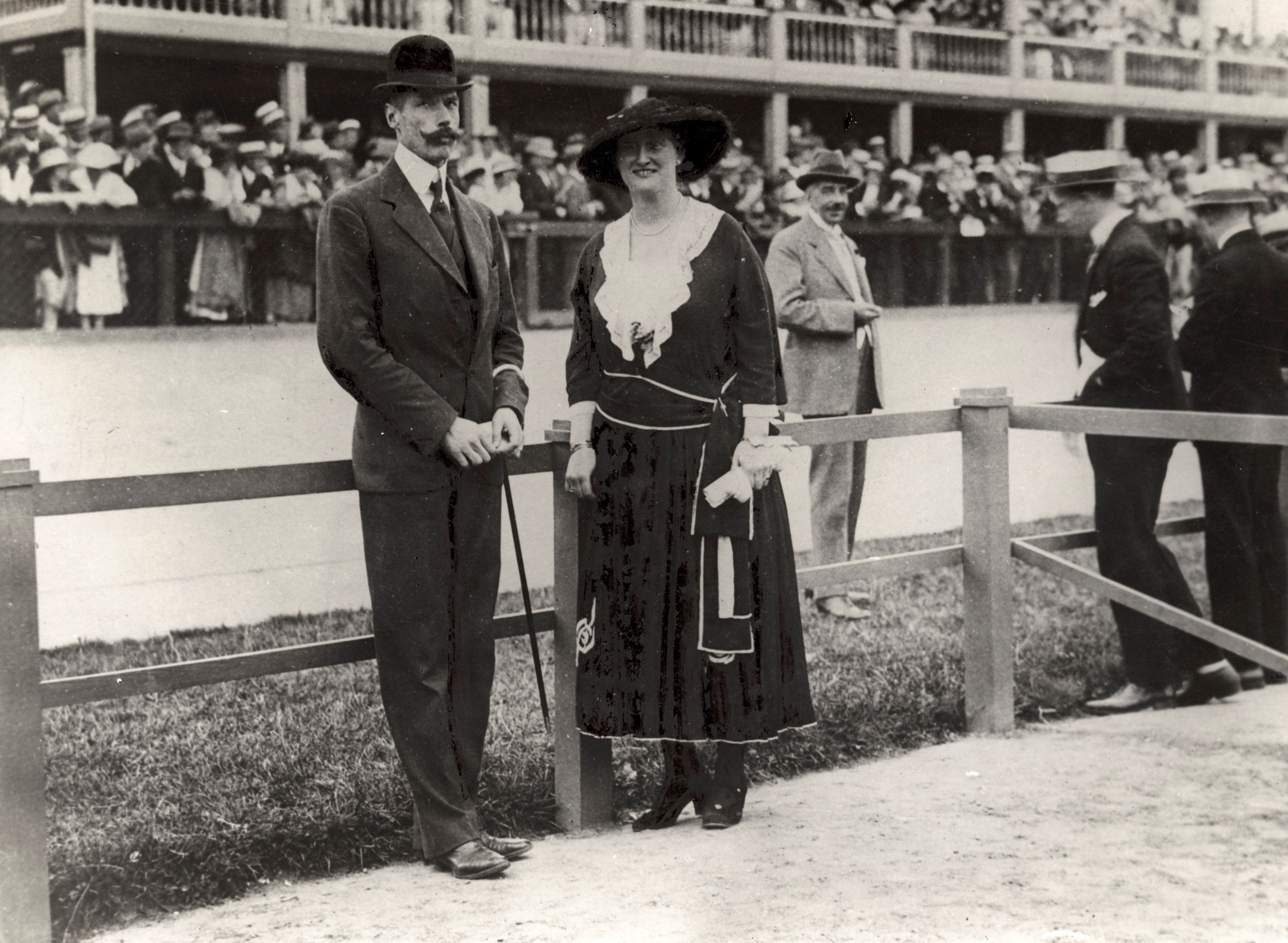
Prince Harald and Princess Helena of Denmark attending the 1921 world track cycling championships at the Ordrup velodrome in Copenhagen.

The 1921 UCI Track Cycling World Championships were the World Championship for track cycling. They took place in Copenhagen, Denmark from 30 July to 8 August 1921. Three events for men were contested, two for professionals and one for amateurs.

== Medal summary ==
Event	Gold	Silver	Bronze
Men's Professional Events
Men's sprint	Piet Moeskops; Netherlands	Robert Spears; Australia	Pierre Sergent; France
Men's motor-paced	Victor Linart; Belgium	Paul Suter; Switzerland	Paul Guignard; France
Men's Amateur Events
Men's sprint	Brask Andersen; Denmark	Erik Kjeldsen; Denmark	Johan Normann; Denmark

== Medal table ==
Rank	Nation	Gold	Silver	Bronze	Total
1	Denmark (DEN)	1	1	1	3
2	Belgium (BEL)	1	0	0	1
2	Netherlands (NED)	1	0	0	1
4	Australia (AUS)	0	1	0	1
4	Switzerland (SUI)	0	1	0	1
6	France (FRA)	0	0	2	2
Totals (6 entries)		3	3	3	9

== See also ==
- 1921 UCI Road World Championships
