= 1922 UCI Track Cycling World Championships =

- Venue: New Brighton, Merseyside, United Kingdom (United Kingdom) (qualifications); Paris, France (finals)
- Date: 19 July – 17 September 1922
- Velodrome: Tower Athletic Ground, Wallasey; Parc des Princes
- Events: 3

The 1922 UCI Track Cycling World Championships were the World Championship for track cycling. The qualifications took place in New Brighton, Merseyside, United Kingdom and, due to persistent rain, the finals in Paris, France from 19 July to 17 September 1922.

Three events for men were contested, two for professionals and one for amateurs.

== Medal summary ==
Event	Gold	Silver	Bronze
Men's Professional Events
Men's sprint	Piet Moeskops; Netherlands	Robert Spears; Australia	Aloïs De Graeve; Belgium
Men's motor-paced	Léon Vanderstuyft; Belgium	Paul Suter; Switzerland	Gustave Ganay; France
Men's Amateur Events
Men's sprint	Thomas Johnson; Great Britain	Maurice Peeters; Netherlands	William Ormston; Great Britain

== Medal table ==
Rank	Nation	Gold	Silver	Bronze	Total
1	Netherlands (NED)	1	1	0	2
2	Belgium (BEL)	1	0	1	2
2	Great Britain (GBR)	1	0	1	2
4	Australia (AUS)	0	1	0	1
4	Switzerland (SUI)	0	1	0	1
6	France (FRA)	0	0	1	1
Totals (6 entries)		3	3	3	9

== See also ==
- 1922 UCI Road World Championships
