= 1909 UCI Track Cycling World Championships =

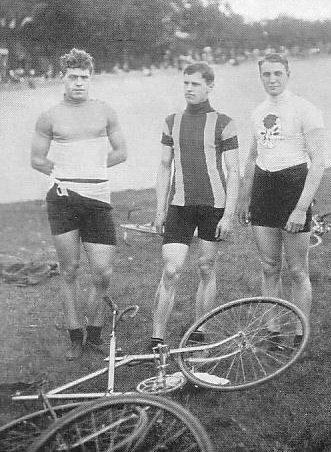
- Maurice Schilles, Karl Neumer, and William Bailey at the 1909 World Championships
- Venue: Copenhagen, Denmark
- Date: 14–23 August 1909
- Velodrome: Ordrup velodrome
- Events: 4

The 1909 UCI Track Cycling World Championships were the World Championship for track cycling. They took place in Copenhagen, Denmark from 14 to 23 August 1909. Four events for men were contested, two for professionals and two for amateurs.

== Medal summary ==
Event	Gold	Silver	Bronze
Men's Professional Events
Men's sprint	Victor Dupré; France	Gabriel Poulain; France	Walter Rütt; Germany
Men's motor-paced	Georges Parent; France	Louis Darragon; France	Nat Butler; United States
Men's Amateur Events
Men's sprint	William Bailey; Great Britain	Karl Neumer; Germany	Maurice Schilles; France
Men's motor-paced	Leon Meredith; Great Britain	Maurice Cuzin; France	Georges Patou; Belgium

== Medal table ==
Rank	Nation	Gold	Silver	Bronze	Total
1	France (FRA)	2	3	1	6
2	Great Britain (GBR)	2	0	0	2
3	Germany (GER)	0	1	1	2
4	Belgium (BEL)	0	0	1	1
4	United States (USA)	0	0	1	1
Totals (5 entries)		4	4	4	12
