= 1929 UCI Track Cycling World Championships =

Cycling championship

- Venue: Zurich, Switzerland
- Date: 11–18 August 1929
- Velodrome: Oerlikon Velodrome
- Events: 3

The 1929 UCI Track Cycling World Championships were the World Championship for track cycling. They took place in Zurich, Switzerland from 11 to 18 August 1929. Three events for men were contested, two for professionals and one for amateurs.

== Medal summary ==
Event	Gold	Silver	Bronze
Men's Professional Events
Men's sprint	Lucien Michard; France	Piet Moeskops; Netherlands	Ernest Kauffmann; Switzerland
Men's motor-paced	Georges Paillard; France	Victor Linart; Belgium	Paul Krewer; Germany
Men's Amateur Events
Men's sprint	Antoine Mazairac; Netherlands	Sydney Cozens; Great Britain	Willy Gervin; Denmark

== Medal table ==
Rank	Nation	Gold	Silver	Bronze	Total
1	France (FRA)	2	0	0	2
2	Netherlands (NED)	1	1	0	2
3	Belgium (BEL)	0	1	0	1
3	Great Britain (GBR)	0	1	0	1
5	Denmark (DEN)	0	0	1	1
5	Germany (GER)	0	0	1	1
5	Switzerland (SUI)	0	0	1	1
Totals (7 entries)		3	3	3	9

== See also ==
- 1929 UCI Road World Championships
