= 1920 UCI Track Cycling World Championships =

- Venue: Antwerp, Belgium
- Date: 6–8 August 1920
- Velodrome: The Garden City Velodrome
- Events: 3

The 1920 UCI Track Cycling World Championships were the World Championship for track cycling. They took place in Antwerp, Belgium from 6 to 8 August 1920. Three events for men were contested, two for professionals and one for amateurs.

== Medal summary ==
Event	Gold	Silver	Bronze
Men's Professional Events
Men's sprint	Robert Spears; Australia	Ernest Kauffmann; Switzerland	William Bailey; Great Britain
Men's motor-paced	Georges Sérès; France	Victor Linart; Belgium	Paul Suter; Switzerland
Men's Amateur Events
Men's sprint	Maurice Peeters; Netherlands	Thomas Johnson; Great Britain	Gerald Halpin; Australia

== Medal table ==
Rank	Nation	Gold	Silver	Bronze	Total
1	Australia (AUS)	1	0	1	2
2	France (FRA)	1	0	0	1
2	Netherlands (NED)	1	0	0	1
4	Great Britain (GBR)	0	1	1	2
4	Switzerland (SUI)	0	1	1	2
6	Belgium (BEL)	0	1	0	1
Totals (6 entries)		3	3	3	9

== See also ==
- Cycling at the 1920 Summer Olympics
