= 1930 UCI Track Cycling World Championships =

1930 World Championship for track cycling

- Venue: Brussels, Belgium
- Date: 24–30 August 1930
- Velodrome: Stade du Centenaire
- Events: 3

The 1930 UCI Track Cycling World Championships were the World Championship for track cycling. They took place in Brussels, Belgium from 24 to 30 August 1930. Three events for men were contested, two for professionals and one for amateurs.

== Medal summary ==
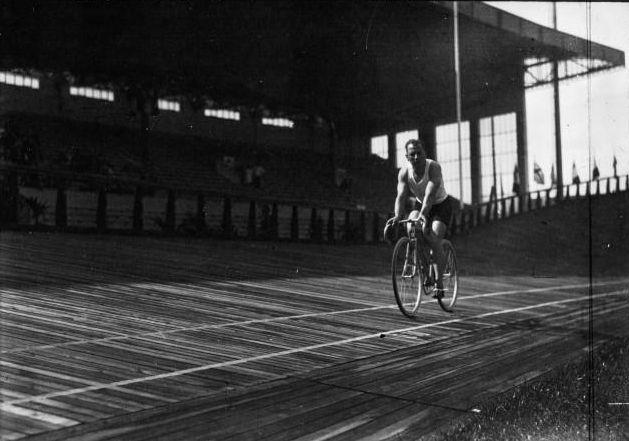
Lucien Michard during the professional men's sprint.

| Event | Gold | Silver | Bronze |
|---|---|---|---|
Men's Professional Events
| Men's sprint | Lucien Michard; France | Piet Moeskops; Netherlands | Orlando Piani; Italy |
| Men's motor-paced | Erich Möller; Germany | Georges Paillard; France | Robert Grassin; France |
Men's Amateur Events
| Men's sprint | Louis Gérardin; France | Sydney Cozens; Great Britain | Bruno Pellizzari; Italy |

== Medal table ==
| Rank | Nation | Gold | Silver | Bronze | Total |
|---|---|---|---|---|---|
| 1 | France (FRA) | 2 | 1 | 1 | 4 |
| 2 | Germany (GER) | 1 | 0 | 0 | 1 |
| 3 | Great Britain (GBR) | 0 | 1 | 0 | 1 |
| 3 | Netherlands (NED) | 0 | 1 | 0 | 1 |
| 5 | Italy (ITA) | 0 | 0 | 2 | 2 |
| Totals (5 entries) | | 3 | 3 | 3 | 9 |

== See also ==
- 1930 UCI Road World Championships
