= 1923 UCI Track Cycling World Championships =

- Venue: Zürich, Switzerland
- Date: 18–26 August 1923
- Velodrome: Oerlikon Velodrome
- Events: 3

The 1923 UCI Track Cycling World Championships were the World Championship for track cycling. They took place in Zürich, Switzerland from 18 to 26 August 1923. Three events for men were contested, two for professionals and one for amateurs.

== Medal summary ==
Event	Gold	Silver	Bronze
Men's Professional Events
Men's sprint	Piet Moeskops; Netherlands	Gabriel Poulain; France	Ernest Kauffmann; Switzerland
Men's motor-paced	Paul Suter; Switzerland	Léon Parisot; France	Karl Wittig; Germany
Men's Amateur Events
Men's sprint	Lucien Michard; France	Antoine Mazairac; Netherlands	Gerard Bosch van Drakestein; Netherlands

== Medal table ==
Rank	Nation	Gold	Silver	Bronze	Total
1	France (FRA)	1	2	0	3
2	Netherlands (NED)	1	1	1	3
3	Switzerland (SUI)	1	0	1	2
4	Germany (GER)	0	0	1	1
Totals (4 entries)		3	3	3	9

== See also ==
- 1923 UCI Road World Championships
