= 1911 UCI Track Cycling World Championships =

- Venue: Rome, Italy
- Date: 1911
- Velodrome: Motovelodromo Appio
- Events: 4

The 1911 UCI Track Cycling World Championships were the World Championship for track cycling. They took place in Rome, Italy in 1911. Four events for men were contested, two for professionals and two for amateurs.

== Medal summary ==
Event	Gold	Silver	Bronze
Men's Professional Events
Men's sprint	Thorvald Ellegaard; Denmark	Léon Hourlier; France	Julien Pouchois; France
Men's motor-paced	Georges Parent; France	Louis Darragon; France	James-Henri Moran; United States
Men's Amateur Events
Men's sprint	William Bailey; Great Britain	Angelo Feroci; Italy	Guido Gasparinetti; Italy
Men's motor-paced	Leon Meredith; Great Britain	Bertus Mulckhijze; Netherlands	Pietro Lori; Italy

== Medal table ==
Rank	Nation	Gold	Silver	Bronze	Total
1	Great Britain (GBR)	2	0	0	2
2	France (FRA)	1	2	1	4
3	Denmark (DEN)	1	0	0	1
4	Italy (ITA)	0	1	2	3
5	Netherlands (NED)	0	1	0	1
6	United States (USA)	0	0	1	1
Totals (6 entries)		4	4	4	12
