= 1926 UCI Track Cycling World Championships =

- Venue: Milan and Turin, Italy
- Date: 24 July – 1 August 1926
- Velodrome: Velódromo Sempione; Motovelodromo di Corso Casale
- Events: 3

The 1926 UCI Track Cycling World Championships were the World Championship for track cycling. They took place in Milan and Turin in Italy from 24 July to 1 August 1926. Three events for men were contested, two for professionals and one for amateurs.

== Medal summary ==
Event	Gold	Silver	Bronze
Men's Professional Events
Men's sprint	Piet Moeskops; Netherlands	Cesare Moretti; Italy	Lucien Michard; France
Men's motor-paced	Victor Linart; Belgium	Gustave Ganay; France	Paul Suter; Switzerland
Men's Amateur Events
Men's sprint	Avanti Martinetti; Italy	Léon Galvaing; France	Antoine Mazairac; Netherlands

== Medal table ==
Rank	Nation	Gold	Silver	Bronze	Total
1	Italy (ITA)	1	1	0	2
2	Netherlands (NED)	1	0	1	2
3	Belgium (BEL)	1	0	0	1
4	France (FRA)	0	2	1	3
5	Switzerland (SUI)	0	0	1	1
Totals (5 entries)		3	3	3	9

== See also ==
- 1926 UCI Road World Championships
