= 1913 UCI Track Cycling World Championships =

- Venue: Berlin (amateurs); Leipzig (professionals), Germany
- Date: 23–31 August 1913
- Velodrome: Deutschen Stadion; Alfred-Rosch-Kampfbahn
- Events: 4

The 1913 UCI Track Cycling World Championships were the World Championship for track cycling. They took place for amateurs in Berlin, Germany and for professionals in Leipzig, Germany from 23 to 31 August 1913. In total four events for men were contested, two for professionals and two for amateurs.

== Medal summary ==
| Event | Gold | Silver | Bronze |
|---|---|---|---|
Men's Professional Events
| Men's sprint | Walter Rütt; Germany | Thorvald Ellegaard; Denmark | André Perchicot; France |
| Men's motor-paced | Paul Guignard; France | Jules Miquel; France | Richard Scheuermann; Germany |
Men's Amateur Events
| Men's sprint | William Bailey; Great Britain | Harry Ryan; Great Britain | Christel Rode; Germany |
| Men's motor-paced | Leon Meredith; Great Britain | Alex Beyer; Germany | Cor Blekemolen; Netherlands |

== Medal table ==
| Rank | Nation | Gold | Silver | Bronze | Total |
|---|---|---|---|---|---|
| 1 | Great Britain (GBR) | 2 | 1 | 0 | 3 |
| 2 | Germany (GER) | 1 | 1 | 2 | 4 |
| 3 | France (FRA) | 1 | 1 | 1 | 3 |
| 4 | Denmark (DEN) | 0 | 1 | 0 | 1 |
| 5 | Netherlands (NED) | 0 | 0 | 1 | 1 |
| Totals (5 entries) | | 4 | 4 | 4 | 12 |
