= Joseph De Bakker =

Belgian cyclist (born 1935)

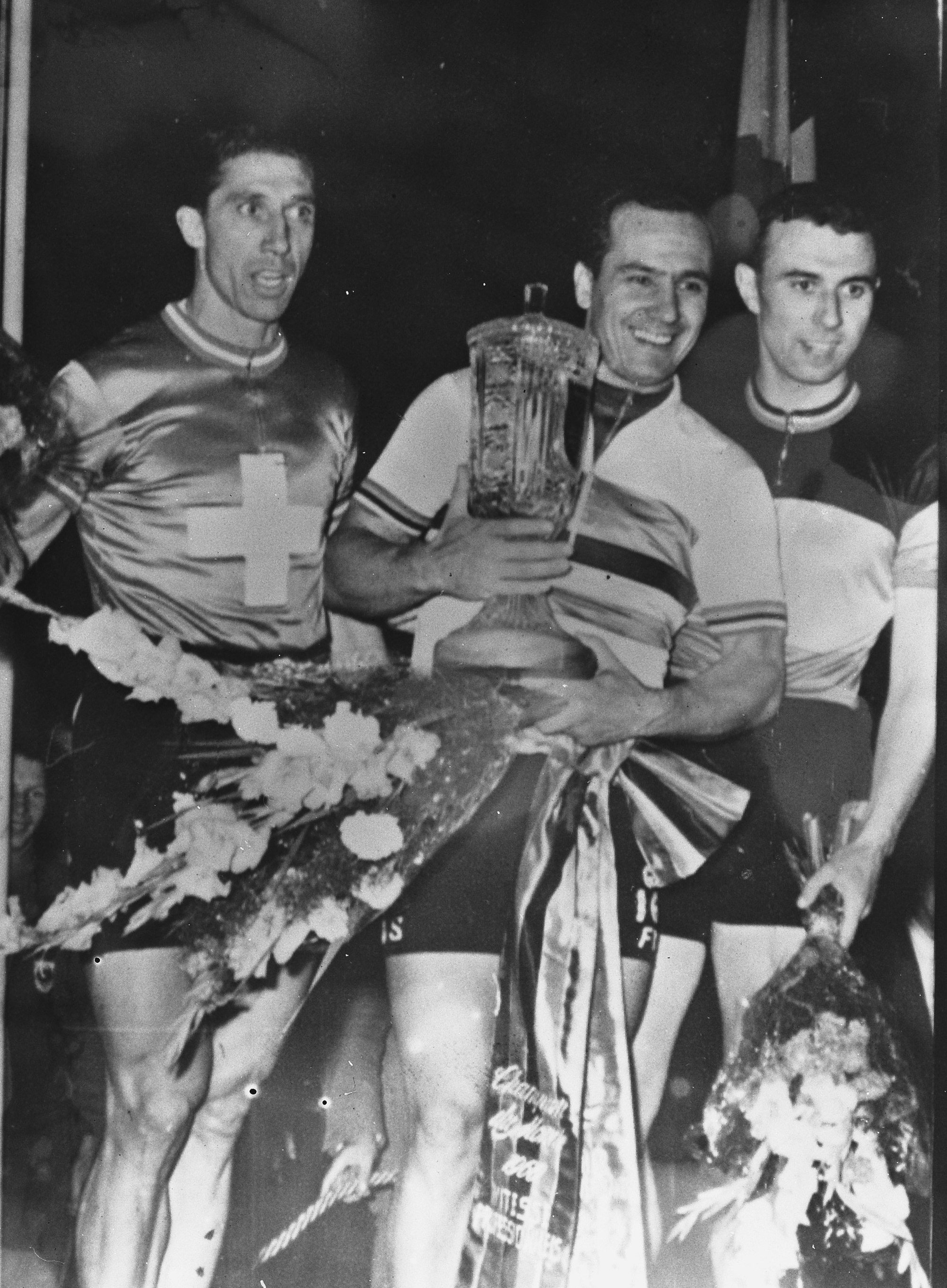
- Joseph De Bakker in Leipzig in 1963

Personal information
- Born: 27 May 1934 Borgerhout, Belgium

Cycling career
- Sport: Cycling
- Discipline: Track
- Role: Rider
- Rider type: Sprinter
Medal record
Representing Belgium
Men's track cycling
World Championships
Bronze medal – third place	1960 Leipzig	Sprint
Bronze medal – third place	1961 Zürich	Sprint
Bronze medal – third place	1963 Rocourt	Sprint
Bronze medal – third place	1964 Paris	Sprint

Joseph De Bakker (born 27 May 1934) is a Belgian former track cyclist. He competed in the 1,000 metres time trial event at the 1952 Summer Olympics. He also won four bronze medals in the sprint event at the UCI Track Cycling World Championships, and was an eight time national sprint champion, winning the event every year from 1957 to 1963 and again in 1966. He also won the Grand Prix de Paris in 1957 and the Six Days of Madrid with Rik Van Steenbergen in 1963.
