= Henri Mayer =

German track cyclist

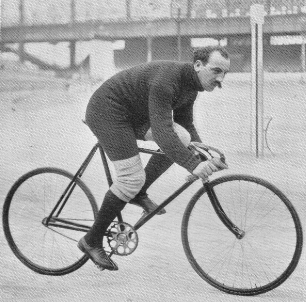

Personal information
- Nickname: Ya-Ya
- Born: 16 January 1878 Hanover, Germany
- Died: 1953 or 1955 Hildesheim, Germany
- Height: 1.78 m (5 ft 10 in)
- Weight: 79 kg (174 lb)

Cycling career
- Sport: Cycling
- Discipline: Track
- Role: Rider
- Rider type: Sprinter
Medal record
Men's track cycling
Representing Germany
World Championships
Silver medal – second place	1907 Paris	Sprint
Bronze medal – third place	1904 London	Sprint
Bronze medal – third place	1905 Antwerp	Sprint

Henri Mayer (16 January 1878 – 1953 or 1955) was a German track cyclist. He most notably won a silver medal in the sprint event at the 1907 UCI Track Cycling World Championships, as well as bronze medals in 1904 and 1905. He also won the Grand Prix de Paris in 1904, the Grand Prix de l'UVF in 1905 and the Grand Prix d'Angers in 1904 and 1907.

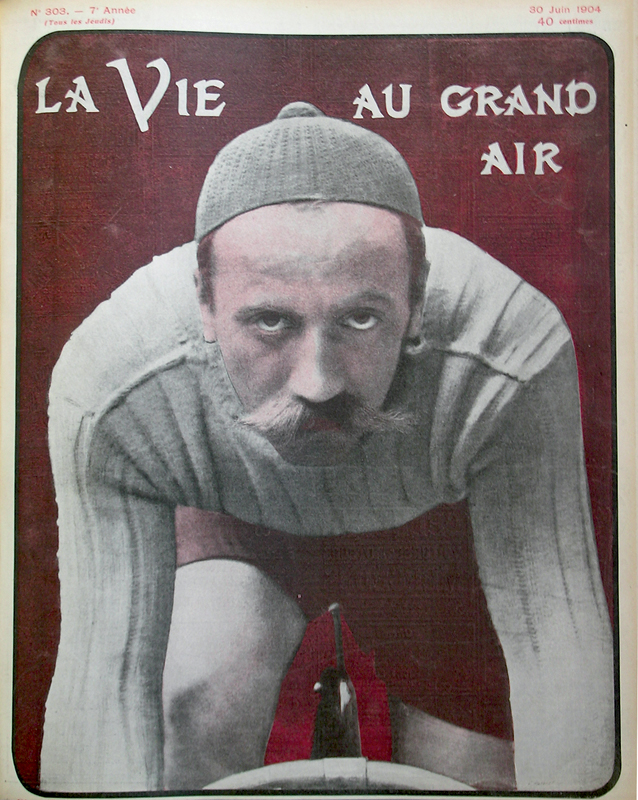
Mayer on the cover of La Vie au grand air, released on 30 June 1904
