= 1948 UCI Track Cycling World Championships =

45th cycling competition

- Venue: Amsterdam, Netherlands
- Date: 23–29 August 1948
- Velodrome: Olympisch Stadion
- Events: 5

The 1948 UCI Track Cycling World Championships were the World Championship for track cycling. They took place in Amsterdam, Netherlands from 23 to 29 August 1948. Five events for men were contested, 3 for professionals and 2 for amateurs.

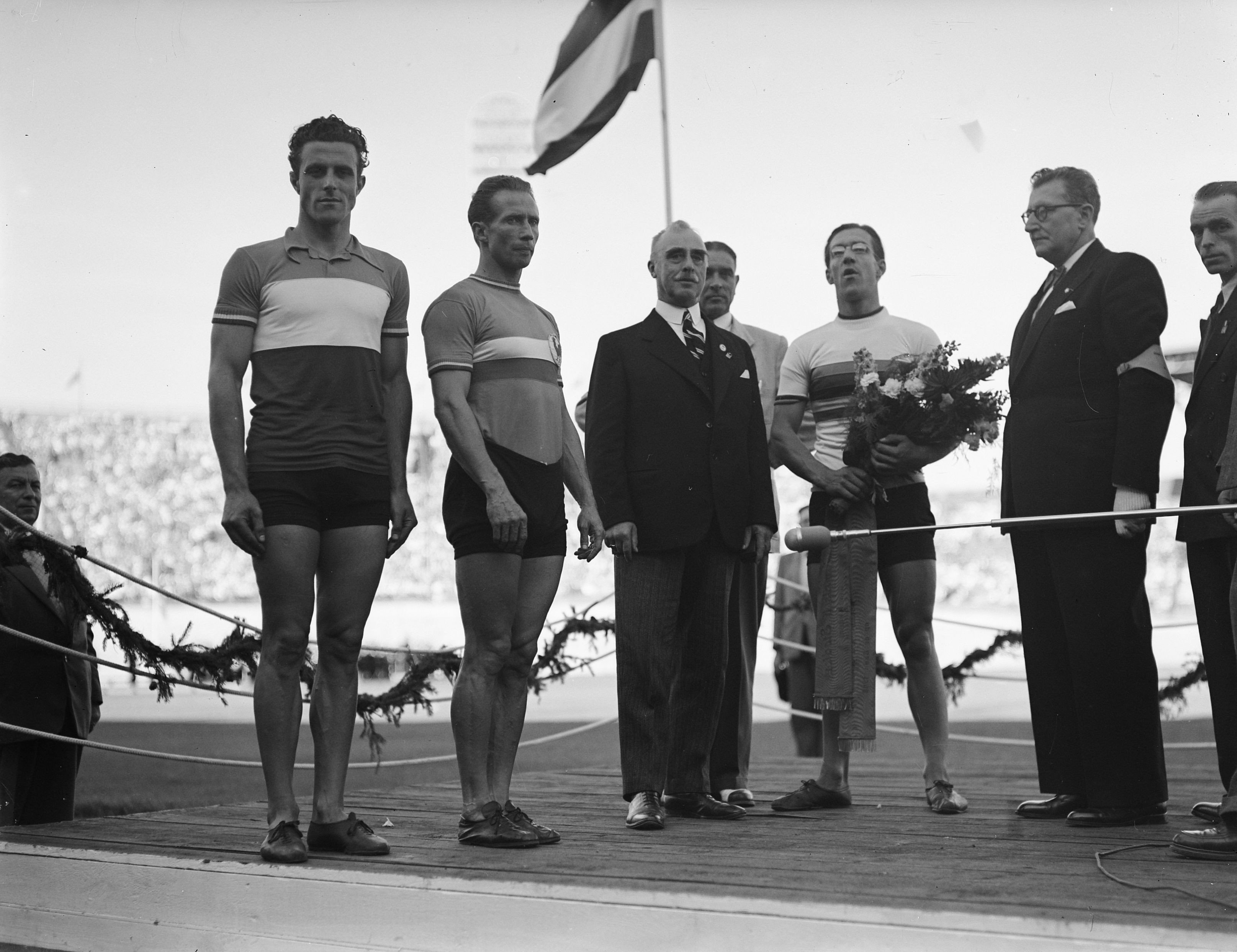
Men's sprint podium: Georges Senfftleben, Louis Gérardin and Arie van Vliet

== Medal summary ==
Event	Gold	Silver	Bronze
Men's Professional Events
Men's sprint	Arie van Vliet; Netherlands	Louis Gérardin; France	Georges Senfftleben; France
Men's individual pursuit	Gerrit Schulte; Netherlands	Fausto Coppi; Italy	Antonio Bevilacqua; Italy
Men's motor-paced	Jean-Jacques Lamboley; France	Elio Frosio; Italy	August Meuleman; Belgium
Men's Amateur Events
Men's sprint	Mario Ghella; Italy	Axel Schandorff; Denmark	Reg Harris; Great Britain
Men's individual pursuit	Guido Messina; Italy	Jacques Dupont; France	Charles Coste; France

== Medal table ==
Rank	Nation	Gold	Silver	Bronze	Total
1	Italy (ITA)	2	2	1	5
2	Netherlands (NED)	2	0	0	2
3	France (FRA)	1	2	2	5
4	Denmark (DEN)	0	1	0	1
5	Belgium (BEL)	0	0	1	1
5	Great Britain (GBR)	0	0	1	1
Totals (6 entries)		5	5	5	15

== See also ==
- 1948 UCI Road World Championships
