= 1901 UCI Track Cycling World Championships =

- Venue: Berlin, German Empire (Germany)
- Date: 7–14 July 1901
- Velodrome: Radrennbahn Friedenau
- Events: 4

The 1901 UCI Track Cycling World Championships were the World Championship for track cycling. They took place in Berlin, Germany from 7 to 14 July 1901. Four events for men were contested, two for professionals and two for amateurs.

== Medal summary ==
Event	Gold	Silver	Bronze
Men's Professional Events
Men's sprint	Thorvald Ellegaard; Denmark	Edmond Jacquelin; France	Gustav Schilling; Netherlands
Men's motor-paced	Thaddäus Robl; Germany	Piet Dickentman; Netherlands	Fritz Ryser; Switzerland
Men's Amateur Events
Men's sprint	Émile Maitrot; France	Léon Veljtruba; Bohemia	Heinrich Struth; Germany
Men's motor-paced	Heinrich Sievers; Germany	Bruno Salzmann; Germany	Alfred Görnemann; Germany

== Medal table ==
Rank	Nation	Gold	Silver	Bronze	Total
1	Germany (GER)	2	1	2	5
2	France (FRA)	1	1	0	2
3	Denmark (DEN)	1	0	0	1
4	Netherlands (NED)	0	1	1	2
5	Bohemia (BOH)	0	1	0	1
6	Switzerland (SUI)	0	0	1	1
Totals (6 entries)		4	4	4	12
