= 1905 UCI Track Cycling World Championships =

Coordinates: 51°12′17.1″N 4°26′7″E

- Venue: Antwerp, Belgium
- Date: 16–23 July 1905
- Velodrome: Velodroom van Zurenborg
- Events: 4

The 1905 UCI Track Cycling World Championships were the World Championship for track cycling. They took place in Antwerp, Belgium from 16 to 23 July 1905. Four events for men were contested, two for professionals and two for amateurs.

== Medal summary ==
Event	Gold	Silver	Bronze
Men's Professional Events
Men's sprint	Gabriel Poulain; France	Thorvald Ellegaard; Denmark	Henri Mayer; Germany
Men's motor-paced	Robert Walthour; United States	Paul Guignard; France	Piet Dickentman; Netherlands
Men's Amateur Events
Men's sprint	Jimmy Benyon; Great Britain	H. D. Buck; Great Britain	Eugène Debognies; France
Men's motor-paced	Leon Meredith; Great Britain	Willy Mest; Germany	Auguste Carremans; Belgium

== Medal table ==
Rank	Nation	Gold	Silver	Bronze	Total
1	Great Britain (GBR)	2	1	0	3
2	France (FRA)	1	1	1	3
3	United States (USA)	1	0	0	1
4	Germany (GER)	0	1	1	2
5	Denmark (DEN)	0	1	0	1
6	Belgium (BEL)	0	0	1	1
6	Netherlands (NED)	0	0	1	1
Totals (7 entries)		4	4	4	12
