= Émile Friol =

French track cyclist

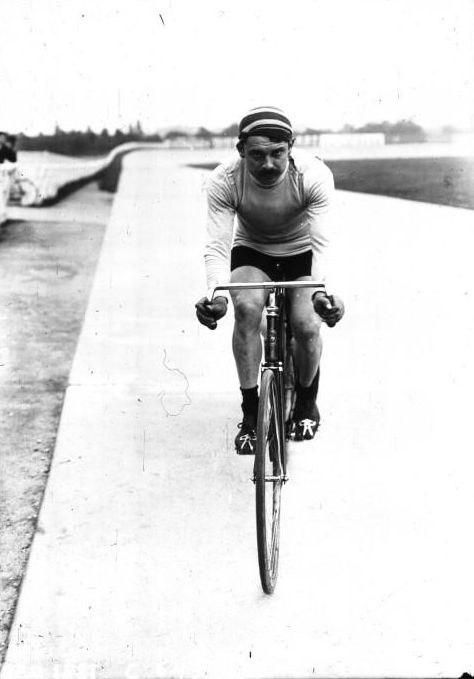
- Friol in 1909

Personal information
- Full name: Émile Louis Friol
- Born: 9 March 1881 Lyon, France
- Died: 16 November 1916 (aged 35) Amiens, France

Cycling career
- Sport: Cycling
- Discipline: Track
- Role: Rider
- Rider type: Sprinter
Medal record
Men's track cycling
Representing France
World Championships
Gold medal – first place	1907 Paris	Sprint
Gold medal – first place	1910 Brussels	Sprint
Bronze medal – third place	1906 Geneva	Sprint

Émile Louis Friol (9 March 1881 – 16 November 1916) was a French track cyclist. He won the sprint event in 1907 and the 1910 UCI Track Cycling World Championships and to a bronze medal in 1906. He also won the European sprint championships in 1907 and 1910 and the French national sprint championships five times: in 1904, 1906, 1907, 1910 and 1913. Other notable victories of his include the Grand Prix de Paris in 1905, 1907, 1909 and 1910, the Grand Prix de Reims in 1907 and 1910, the Grand Prix de l'UVF in 1908, 1910 and 1911 and the 1910 Grand Prix de Buffalo.

In 1916 Friol died during his service as a soldier in the First World War on the Western Front after being hit by a bomb while driving a motorcycle.
