= Ernst Kaufmann =

Swiss cyclist

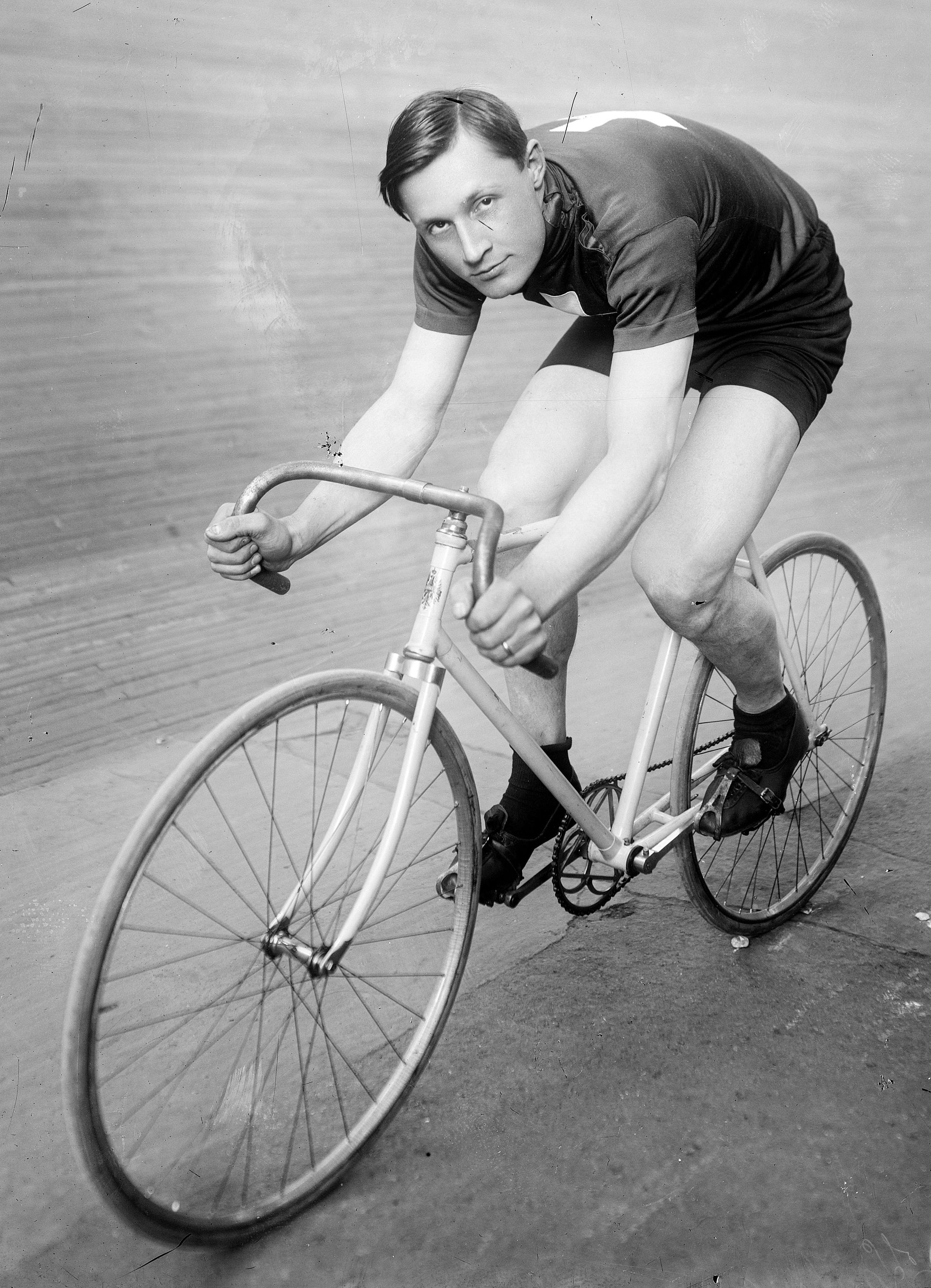
- Ernest Kauffmann in 1919

Personal information
- Born: 9 June 1895 Bellikon, Switzerland
- Died: 20 December 1943 (aged 48) Bellikon, Switzerland

Cycling career
- Sport: Cycling
- Disciplines: Track; Road
- Role: Rider
- Rider type: Sprinter
Medal record
Men's track cycling
Representing Switzerland
World Championships
Gold medal – first place	1925 Amsterdam	Sprint
Silver medal – second place	1920 Antwerp	Sprint
Silver medal – second place	1924 Paris	Sprint
Silver medal – second place	1927 Cologne	Sprint
Bronze medal – third place	1923 Zürich	Sprint
Bronze medal – third place	1928 Budapest	Sprint
Bronze medal – third place	1929 Zürich	Sprint

Ernst Kaufmann (9 June 1895 – 20 December 1943) was a Swiss racing cyclist. He won the sprint event at the 1925 UCI Track Cycling World Championships and the Grand Prix de Paris in 1923 and 1927. He was the Swiss National Road Race champion in 1917 and 1918, and was an 18-time national sprint champion.
