= Gabriel Poulain =

French track cyclist

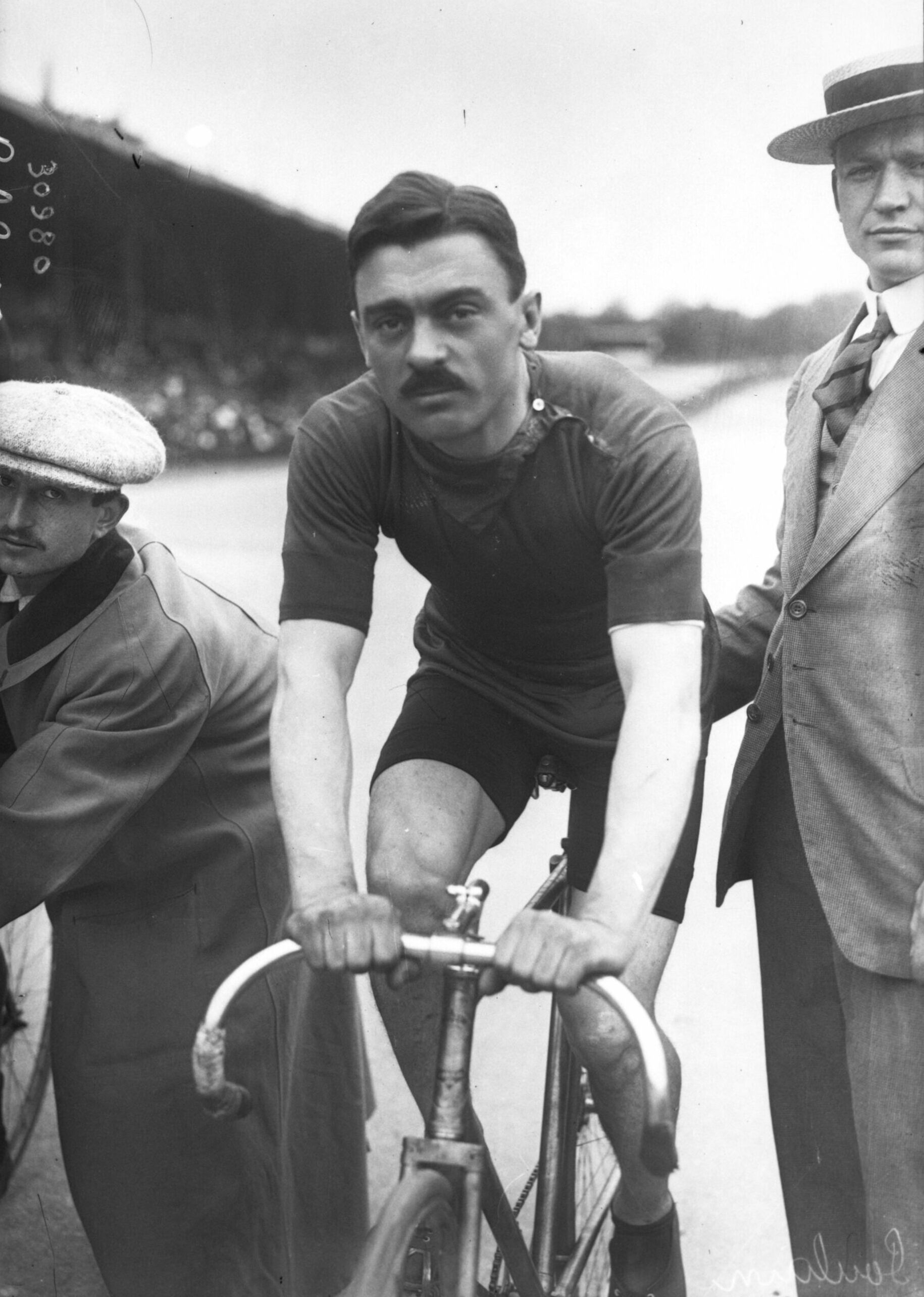
- Gabriel Poulain in 1913

Personal information
- Born: 14 February 1884 St Helier, Jersey
- Died: 9 January 1953 (aged 68) Amiens, France

Cycling career
- Sport: Cycling
- Discipline: Track
- Role: Rider
- Rider type: Sprinter

Professional team
- 1906: Peugeot–Wolber
Medal record
Men's track cycling
Representing France
World Championships
Gold medal – first place	1905 Antwerp	Sprint
Silver medal – second place	1906 Geneva	Sprint
Silver medal – second place	1908 Geneva	Sprint
Silver medal – second place	1909 Copenhagen	Sprint
Silver medal – second place	1923 Zürich	Sprint

Gabriel Poulain (14 February 1884 – 9 January 1953) was a French champion cyclist. He won the sprint event at the 1905 UCI Track Cycling World Championships in addition to four silver medals in the same event. He also won the Grand Prix de l'UVF in 1906.

He made several attempts to achieve human-powered flight. In July 1921, he won a prize of 10,000 francs awarded by Peugeot for a flight of ten metres at a height of one metre, using a bicycle with two wing planes in the Bois de Boulogne in Paris.
