= 1908 UCI Track Cycling World Championships =

- Venue: Berlin (professionals) and Leipzig (amateurs), Germany
- Date: 26 July - 2 August 1908
- Velodrome: Radrennbahn Steglitz; Leipzig-Lindenau Radrennbahn
- Events: 4

The 1908 UCI Track Cycling World Championships were the World Championship for track cycling. They took place in Berlin for professionals and in Leipzig for amateurs in Germany from 26 July to 2 August 1908. Four events for men were contested, two for professionals and two for amateurs.

== Medal summary ==
Event	Gold	Silver	Bronze
Men's Professional Events
Men's sprint	Thorvald Ellegaard; Denmark	Gabriel Poulain; France	Charles-Louis Vanden Born; Belgium
Men's motor-paced	Fritz Ryser; Switzerland	Eugenio Bruni; Italy	Arthur Vanderstuyft; Belgium
Men's Amateur Events
Men's sprint	Victor Johnson; Great Britain	Benjamin Jones; Great Britain	Emile Demangel; France
Men's motor-paced	Leon Meredith; Great Britain	Gustav Janke; Denmark	Léon Vanderstuyft; Belgium

== Medal table ==
Rank	Nation	Gold	Silver	Bronze	Total
1	Great Britain (GBR)	2	1	0	3
2	Denmark (DEN)	1	1	0	2
3	Switzerland (SUI)	1	0	0	1
4	France (FRA)	0	1	1	2
5	Italy (ITA)	0	1	0	1
6	Belgium (BEL)	0	0	3	3
Totals (6 entries)		4	4	4	12

== See also ==
- Cycling at the 1908 Summer Olympics
