= 1910 UCI Track Cycling World Championships =

- Venue: Brussels, Belgium
- Date: 17–25 July 1910
- Velodrome: Velodroom van Karreveld
- Events: 4

The 1910 UCI Track Cycling World Championships were the World Championship for track cycling. They took place in Brussels, Belgium from 17 to 25 July 1910. Four events for men were contested, two for professionals and two for amateurs.

== Medal summary ==
Event	Gold	Silver	Bronze
Men's Professional Events
Men's sprint	Émile Friol; France	Thorvald Ellegaard; Denmark	Walter Rütt; Germany
Men's motor-paced	Georges Parent; France	Léon Vanderstuyft; Belgium	Robert Walthour; United States
Men's Amateur Events
Men's sprint	William Bailey; Great Britain	Karl Neumer; Germany	Paul Texier; France
Men's motor-paced	Henri Hens; Belgium	Louis Delbor; France	Sydney F. Bailey; Great Britain

== Events ==
=== Amateur sprint ===
In the heats of the amateur sprint, the Dutch Dorus Nijland would have won his heat of Frenchman Paul Texier (who later won the bronze medal) by more than 20 centimeters, but the neutral official named Texier as the winner.

== Medal table ==
Rank	Nation	Gold	Silver	Bronze	Total
1	France (FRA)	2	1	1	4
2	Belgium (BEL)	1	1	0	2
3	Great Britain (GBR)	1	0	1	2
4	Germany (GER)	0	1	1	2
5	Denmark (DEN)	0	1	0	1
6	United States (USA)	0	0	1	1
Totals (6 entries)		4	4	4	12
