= Piet Moeskops =

Dutch cyclist (1893–1964)

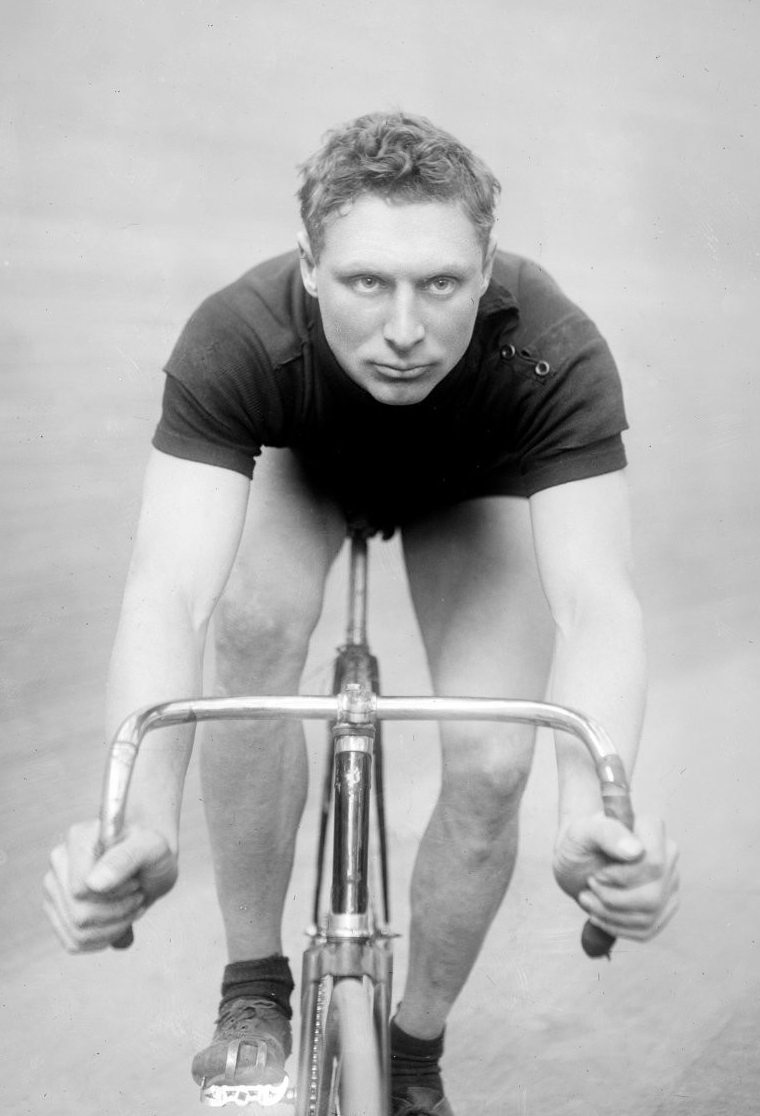
- Piet Moeskops in 1919

Personal information
- Full name: Pieter Daniel Moeskops
- Nicknames: 'Big Pete', 'Big Piet'
- Born: 13 November 1893 Loosduinen, the Netherlands
- Died: 16 November 1964 (aged 71) The Hague, the Netherlands

Cycling career
- Sport: Cycling
- Discipline: Track
- Role: Sprinter

Major wins
- 1921-1924, 1926 UCI World Champion - Sprint; 192x-1932 8× Dutch Professional Champion; 1933 - Grand Prix of Alis
Medal record
Representing the Netherlands
UCI Track Cycling World Championships (professionals)
Gold medal – first place	1921 Copenhagen	Sprint
Gold medal – first place	1922 Paris	Sprint
Gold medal – first place	1923 Zürich	Sprint
Gold medal – first place	1924 Paris	Sprint
Gold medal – first place	1926 Milan	Sprint
Silver medal – second place	1929 Zürich	Sprint
Silver medal – second place	1930 Brussels	Sprint

Pieter Daniel Moeskops (13 November 1893 – 16 November 1964) was a Dutch cyclist, who won the UCI Track Cycling World Championships - Men's Sprint in 1921-1924 and 1926.

Born in Loosduinen, as a boy he rode a delivery bike for his father's business. By 1914 he became the first Netherlands sprint champion, but the outbreak of the First World War meant that no international matches were organised. Only after the war could Moeskops turn professional.

In 1921 he won his first UCI World Title, beating the reigning world champion from Australia, Bob Spears. He retained the world title again for the next three years, and won it again in 1926. In 1925, in Amsterdam, he was beaten in the semi-finals. In 1929 and 1930 he reached the finals but was defeated by the Frenchman Lucien Michard. He was eight times Dutch professional champion, the last time in 1932.

Moeskops was a good tactician, studying opponents carefully so that he could predict where someone would attack him. For a cyclist he was very tall and was known as "Big Pete".

In 1930 Moeskops underwent major surgery which accelerated the end of his cycling career. His last major victory was in the Grand Prix of Alis (France) in 1933. In retirement he became the owner of a café. He was a national hero, and in 1963 he appeared on the television programme Voor de vuist weg with Willem Duys. A year later he died in The Hague, at 71 years of age.

Moeskops is buried at the 'Old Oak' cemetery in the Den Haag Dunes. The municipalities of Krugersdorp and Nijmegen, and the Loosduinen district of The Hague, have streets named after him.
