= Walter Rütt =

German track cyclist

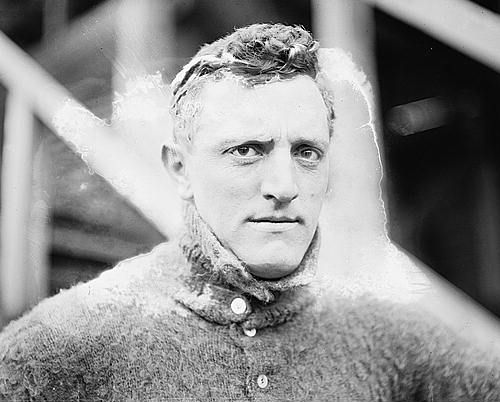
- Rütt in 1912

Personal information
- Full name: Walter Oscar Rütt
- Born: 12 September 1883 Morsbach, Würselen, Germany
- Died: 23 June 1964 (aged 80) Berlin, Germany

Cycling career
- Sport: Cycling
- Discipline: Track
- Role: Rider
- Rider type: Sprinter
Medal record
Men's track cycling
Representing Germany
World Championships
| Gold medal – first place | 1913 Leipzig | Sprint |
| Bronze medal – third place | 1907 Paris | Sprint |
| Bronze medal – third place | 1909 Copenhagen | Sprint |
| Bronze medal – third place | 1910 Brussels | Sprint |

Walter Oscar Rütt (12 September 1883 – 23 June 1964) was a German track cyclist.

A professional from 1900 to 1926, Rütt recorded 933 victories in 25 years, including nine victories in six-day races. He most notably won the sprint event at the 1913 UCI Track Cycling World Championships. He also won three bronze medals in the same event prior to his victory. He also won the European sprint championships in 1911 and the German national sprint championships in 1910, 1919, 1920 and 1923. Other notable non-championship victories of his include the Grand Prix de Paris in 1913, the Grand Prix de l'UVF in 1904 and 1909 and the Grand Prix de l'UCI in 1907.

He won the Six Days of New York three times, the Six Days of Berlin four times and the Six Days of Frankfurt in 1911.
