= 1923 UCI Road World Championships =

- Venue: Zürich, Switzerland
- Date(s): 25 August 1923
- Coordinates: 47°22′28″N 08°32′28″E
- Nations participating: 11
- Events: 1

The 1923 UCI Road World Championships was the third edition of the UCI Road World Championships. It took place on Saturday 23 August 1923 in Zürich, Switzerland and consisted of 1 race for amateur cyclists.

In the same period, the 1923 UCI Track Cycling World Championships was organized in the Oerlikon Velodrome of Zürich.

== Events summary ==
Event	Gold		Silver		Bronze	
Men's events
Men's amateur road race	Liberio Ferrario; Italy	5h 25 sec.	Othmar Eichenberger; Switzerland	s.t.	Georges Antenen; Switzerland	s.t.

== Medal table ==
Rank	Nation	Gold	Silver	Bronze	Total
1	Italy (ITA)	1	0	0	1
2	Switzerland (SUI)	0	1	1	2
Totals (2 entries)		1	1	1	3

== Results ==
The course was 164 km.

Place	Rider	Country	Time
1	Libero Ferrario	Italy	5h 0 min. 25 sec.
2	Othmar Eichenberger	Switzerland	s.t.
3	Georges Antenen	Switzerland	s.t.
4	Luigi Magnotti	Italy	s.t.
5	Achille Souchard	France	s.t.
6	André Leducq	France	s.t.
7	Ermanno Vallazza	Italy	s.t.
8	Georges Wambst	France	+1'35
9	Nello Ciaccheri	Italy	+2'53
10	Karl Senn	Switzerland	+2'53
11	Ragnar Malm	Sweden	+2'53
12	Bruno Masoni	Switzerland	+5'48
13	Valdemar Christoffer Nielsen	Denmark	+5'48
14	Alois Schneidewind	Germany	+6'39
15	Maurice Bonney	France	+10'06
16	Henry-Peter Hansen	Denmark	+10'06
17	Henri Hoevenaers	Belgium	+10'06
18	Andy Wilson	United States	+10'06
19	Alfons De Cat	Belgium	+10'44
20	Paul Kroll	Germany	+12'03
21	Jan Maas	Netherlands	+12'04
22	Fernand Saive	Belgium	+16'16
23	Mathias Stollenwerk	Germany	+19'49
24	Leonard Daghelinckx	Belgium	+27'30
25	Dave Marsh	United Kingdom	+32:52
26	Joris Van Dijk	Netherlands	+37:03
27	Karl Kohl	Germany	+37'03
28	William Burkill	United Kingdom	+37'11
29	Samuel Hunter	United Kingdom	+37'11
30	Alexander Magiar	Hungary	+46'12
31	Sepp Hellensteiner	Austria	+46'44
32	Georg Frederik Ahrensborg Clausen	Denmark	+50'00

== See also ==
- 1923 UCI Track Cycling World Championships
