= 1904 UCI Track Cycling World Championships =

- Venue: London, United Kingdom
- Date(s): 3–10 September 1904
- Velodrome: Crystal Palace velodrome
- Events: 4

The 1904 UCI Track Cycling World Championships were the World Championship for track cycling. They took place in London, United Kingdom from 3 to 10 September 1904. Four events for men were contested, two for professionals and two for amateurs.

== Medal summary ==
Event	Gold	Silver	Bronze
Men's Professional Events
Men's sprint	Iver Lawson; United States	Thorvald Ellegaard; Denmark	Henri Mayer; Germany
Men's motor-paced	Robert Walthour; United States	César Simar; France	Arthur Vanderstuyft; Belgium
Men's Amateur Events
Men's sprint	Marcus Hurley; United States	Arthur Reed; Great Britain	Jimmy Benyon; Great Britain
Men's motor-paced	Leon Meredith; Great Britain	W.J. Pett; Great Britain	George A. Olley; Great Britain

== Medal table ==
Rank	Nation	Gold	Silver	Bronze	Total
1	United States (USA)	3	0	0	3
2	Great Britain (GBR)	1	2	2	5
3	Denmark (DEN)	0	1	0	1
3	France (FRA)	0	1	0	1
5	Belgium (BEL)	0	0	1	1
5	Germany (GER)	0	0	1	1
Totals (6 entries)		4	4	4	12

== See also ==
- Cycling at the 1904 Summer Olympics
