= 1895 ICA Track Cycling World Championships =

- Venue: Cologne, Germany
- Date: 17–19 August 1895
- Velodrome: Riehler Radrennbahn
- Events: 4

The 1895 ICA Track Cycling World Championships were the World Championship for track cycling. They took place in Cologne, Germany from 17 to 19 August 1895. Four events for men were contested, two for professionals and two for amateurs.

== Medal summary ==
Event	Gold	Silver	Bronze
Men's Professional Events
Men's sprint	Robert Protin; Belgium	George A. Banker; United States	Émile Huet; Belgium
Men's motor-paced	Jimmy Michael; United Kingdom	Henri Luyten; Belgium	Hans Hofmann; Germany
Men's Amateur Events
Men's sprint	Jaap Eden; Netherlands	Christian Ingemann; Denmark	Jean Schaaf; Germany
Men's motor-paced	Mathieu Cordang; Netherlands	Kees Witteveen; Netherlands	Wilhelm Henie; Norway

== Medal table ==
Rank	Nation	Gold	Silver	Bronze	Total
1	Netherlands (NED)	2	1	0	3
2	Belgium (BEL)	1	1	1	3
3	Great Britain (GBR)	1	0	0	1
4	Denmark (DEN)	0	1	0	1
4	United States (USA)	0	1	0	1
6	Germany (GER)	0	0	2	2
7	Norway (NOR)	0	0	1	1
Totals (7 entries)		4	4	4	12
