= 1926 UCI Road World Championships =

- Venue: Milan, Italy
- Date: 29 July 1926
- Coordinates: 45°28′01″N 09°11′24″E
- Events: 1

The 1926 UCI Road World Championships was the sixth edition of the UCI Road World Championships. The championship took place in Milan, Italy on Thursday 29 July 1926 and consisted of 1 race for amateur cyclists.

In the same period, the 1926 UCI Track Cycling World Championships was organized in the Velódromo Sempione in Milan and in the Motovelodromo di Corso Casale in Turin.

== Events summary ==
Event	Gold		Silver		Bronze	
Men's events
Men's amateur road race	Octave Dayen; France	6h 15min	Jules Merviel; France	s.t.	Pierre Polano; Italy	s.t.

== Medal table ==
Rank	Nation	Gold	Silver	Bronze	Total
1	France (FRA)	1	1	0	2
2	Italy (ITA)	0	0	1	1
Totals (2 entries)		1	1	1	3

== Results ==
The course was 183 km from Milan to Turin. There were 44 participants.

Place	Rider	Country	Time
1	Octave Dayen	France	6 u. 15 min.
2	Jules Merviel	France	same time
3	Piero Polano	Italy	s.t.
4	Karl Bohrer	Czechoslovakia	s.t.
5	Allegro Grandi	Italy	s.t.
6	René Brossy	France	s.t.
7	Hans Hang	Netherlands	s.t.
8	Otto Gugau	Germany	s.t.
9	Giovanni Balla	Italy	s.t.
10	Max Gunther	Germany	s.t.
11	Frank Southall	United Kingdom	s.t.
12	Fritz Koblassa	Australia	s.t.
13	Renato Zanone	Italy	s.t.
14	Eugene Schlegel	Switzerland	3:00 min.
15	Otto Cap	Australia	s.t.
16	Piet Van der Horst	Netherlands	s.t.
17	Frederick-Henry Wyld	United Kingdom	s.t.
18	Marcel Clocquet	Belgium	s.t.
19	Elemer Holzl	Hungary	s.t.
20	Henry Hansen	Denmark	s.t.
21	André Aumerlé	France	s.t.
22	Rezo Bouska	Hungary	s.t.
23	Antonín Honig	Czechoslovakia	s.t.
24	Karel Červenka	Czechoslovakia	s.t.
25	Erik Andersen	Denmark	s.t.
26	Blob Harbour	United Kingdom	s.t.
27	Nandor Velvart	Hungary	s.t.
28	Henry Jorgensen	Denmark	s.t.
29	Koloman Sović	Yugoslavia	s.t.
30	Autun Banek	Yugoslavia	s.t.
31	Willi Meyer	Germany	s.t.
32	László Vida	Hungary	s.t.

== See also ==
- 1926 UCI Track Cycling World Championships
