= Thorvald Ellegaard =

Danish cyclist (1877–1954)

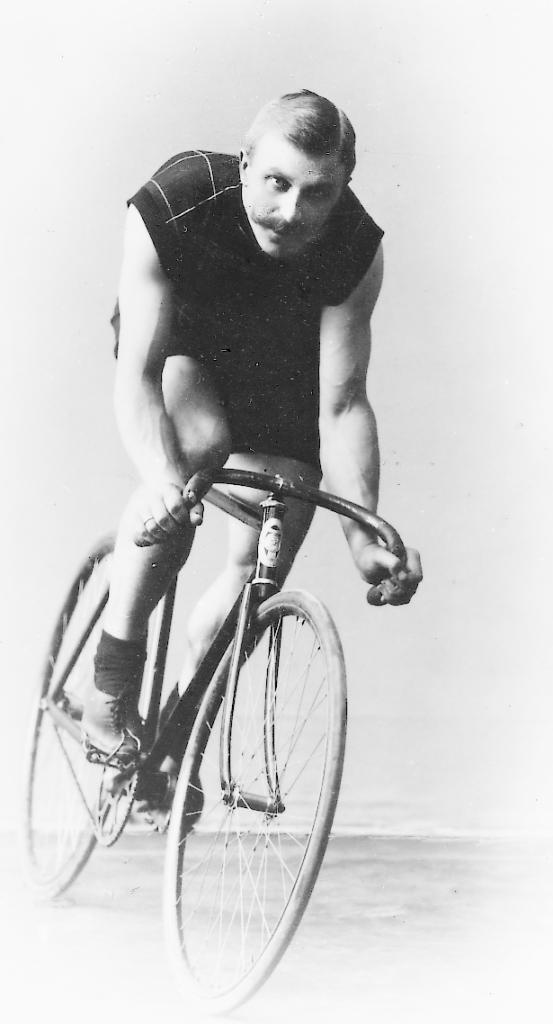

Personal information
- Full name: Thorvald Kristian Ellegaard (born Kristensen)
- Born: 7 March 1877 Fangel, Denmark
- Died: 27 July 1954 (aged 77) Copenhagen, Denmark

Cycling career
- Sport: Cycling
- Discipline: Track
- Role: Rider
Medal record
Men's track cycling
Representing Denmark
World Championships
Gold medal – first place	1901 Berlin	Sprint
Gold medal – first place	1902 Rome	Sprint
Gold medal – first place	1903 Copenhagen	Sprint
Gold medal – first place	1906 Geneva	Sprint
Gold medal – first place	1908 Berlin	Sprint
Gold medal – first place	1911 Rome	Sprint
Silver medal – second place	1904 London	Sprint
Silver medal – second place	1905 Antwerp	Sprint
Silver medal – second place	1910 Brussels	Sprint
Silver medal – second place	1913 Leipzig	Sprint

Thorvald Ellegaard (7 March 1877 - 27 April 1954) was a leading Danish track racing cyclist in the 1900s and 1910s. He won the world professional sprint title six times, three European titles, and 24 Danish titles. He also won the Grand Prix de Paris in 1901 and 1911. Over the course of his long career, which spanned 31 years, he competed in 1,560 significant races, winning 925 of them. He was Denmark's first sports idol.

== Biography ==
Thorvald Kristian Kristensen was born on 7 March 1877 in Fangel, a village 12 km south-west of Odense on the Danish island of Funen. He had his debut on 23 May 1895 in Slagelse. Like his brother, Peter, he changed his name to Ellegård after the farm where they were born. He completed a mason's apprenticeship in 1896.

In 1898 he became professional as the first Danish racing cyclist from the provinces. By 1899, the international community had become aware of his talent and started speculating that he could become the next big star. In 1901 he won both the world championship in sprint and the prestigious Grand Prix de la Ville de Paris. Over the following decade, Ellegård remained the world's leading racing cyclist.

From 1912 Ellegård took up permanent residence with his family in Paris so that his daughter, France Ellegård, could complete her training as a pianist. He participated in his last race on 26 September 1926 at the age of 49. He died on 27 April 1954 and is interred at Søllerød cemetery.

== See also ==
- UCI Track Cycling World Championships – Men's sprint
- Sports in Denmark
