= Sydney Cozens =

British cyclist

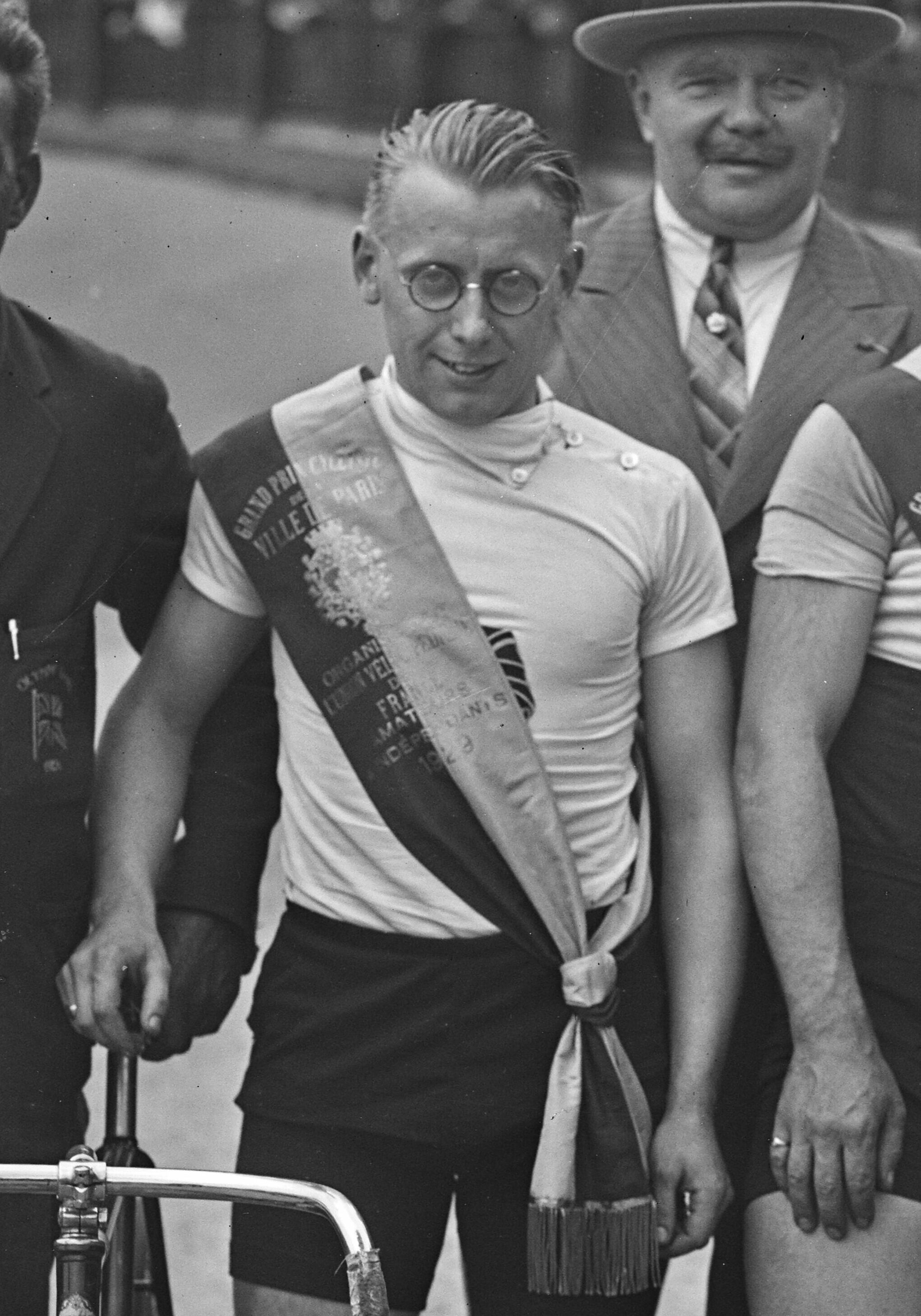
- Cozens in 1929

Personal information
- Born: 17 July 1908 Manchester, England
- Died: 5 February 1985 (aged 76) New Brunswick, Canada

Cycling career
- Sport: Cycling
- Discipline: Track

Amateur team
- 1924–1931: Manchester Wheelers
Medal record
Representing United Kingdom
Men's track cycling
World Championships
Silver medal – second place	1929 Zürich	Amateur sprint
Silver medal – second place	1930 Brussels	Amateur sprint
British National Individual Sprint Championships
Gold medal – first place	1930 Herne Hill	1,000m sprint

Sydney Turner Cozens (17 July 1908 – 5 February 1985) was a British cyclist. He competed in the sprint event at the 1928 Summer Olympics.

Sydney was the British champion in track cycling at the inaugural British National Individual Sprint Championships in 1930.
