= George A. Banker =

American cyclist (1874–1917)

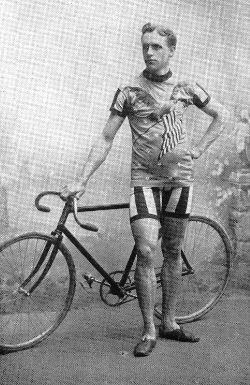
- Banker in 1907

Personal information
- Full name: George August Banker
- Born: August 8, 1874 Pittsburgh, Pennsylvania, U.S.
- Died: December 1, 1917 (aged 43) Pittsburgh, Pennsylvania, U.S.

Cycling career
- Sport: Cycling
- Discipline: Track
- Role: Rider
- Rider type: Sprinter
Medal record
Men's track cycling
Representing United States
World Championships
Silver medal – second place	1895 Cologne	Sprint
Gold medal – first place	1898 Vienna	Sprint

George A. Banker (August 8, 1874 – December 1, 1917) was an American track cyclist.

== Major results ==
1894
1st Grand Prix de Paris
2nd World Sprint Championships
2nd Grand Prix de l'UVF
1895
1st Grand Prix de l'UVF
3rd Grand Prix de Paris
1898
1st World Sprint Championships
