= Victor Dupré (cyclist) =

French track cyclist

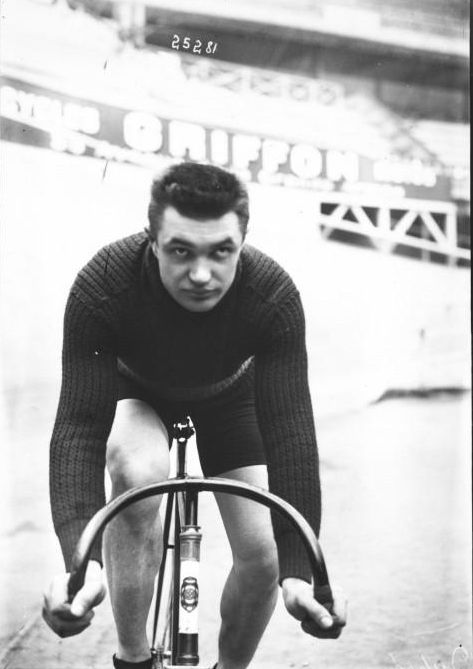
- Dupré in 1912

Personal information
- Born: 11 March 1884 Roanne, France
- Died: 7 June 1938 (aged 54) Vernay, Rhône, France

Cycling career
- Sport: Cycling
- Discipline: Track
- Role: Rider
- Rider type: Sprinter
Medal record
Men's track cycling
Representing France
World Championships
Gold medal – first place	1909 Copenhagen	Sprint

Victor Dupré (11 March 1884 – 7 June 1938) was a French track cyclist. He won the sprint event at the 1909 UCI Track Cycling World Championships. He also won the French national sprint championships in 1909, the Grand Prix de Reims in 1909 and the Grand Prix de Buffalo in 1909 and 1914.

On the road, he competed in the 1903 Tour de France, but dropped out on the first stage.
