= Yoshikazu Sugata =

Japanese cyclist

Personal information
- Born: 14 February 1964 (age 62) Miyagi Prefecture, Japan

Cycling career
- Sport: Cycling
- Discipline: Track
- Role: Rider
- Rider type: Sprinter
Medal record
Men's track cycling
Representing Japan
World Championships
Silver medal – second place	1977 San Cristóbal	Sprint
Bronze medal – third place	1976 Monteroni di Lecce	Sprint

Yoshikazu Sugata (菅田 順和, Sugata Yoshikazu; 4 December 1953) is a Japanese former track cyclist who won a silver medal in the sprint competition at the 1977 UCI Track Cycling World Championships and a bronze medal in the same event in 1976. He was also a professional keirin cyclist with over 500 wins.
