= Louis Gérardin =

French cyclist (1912–1982)

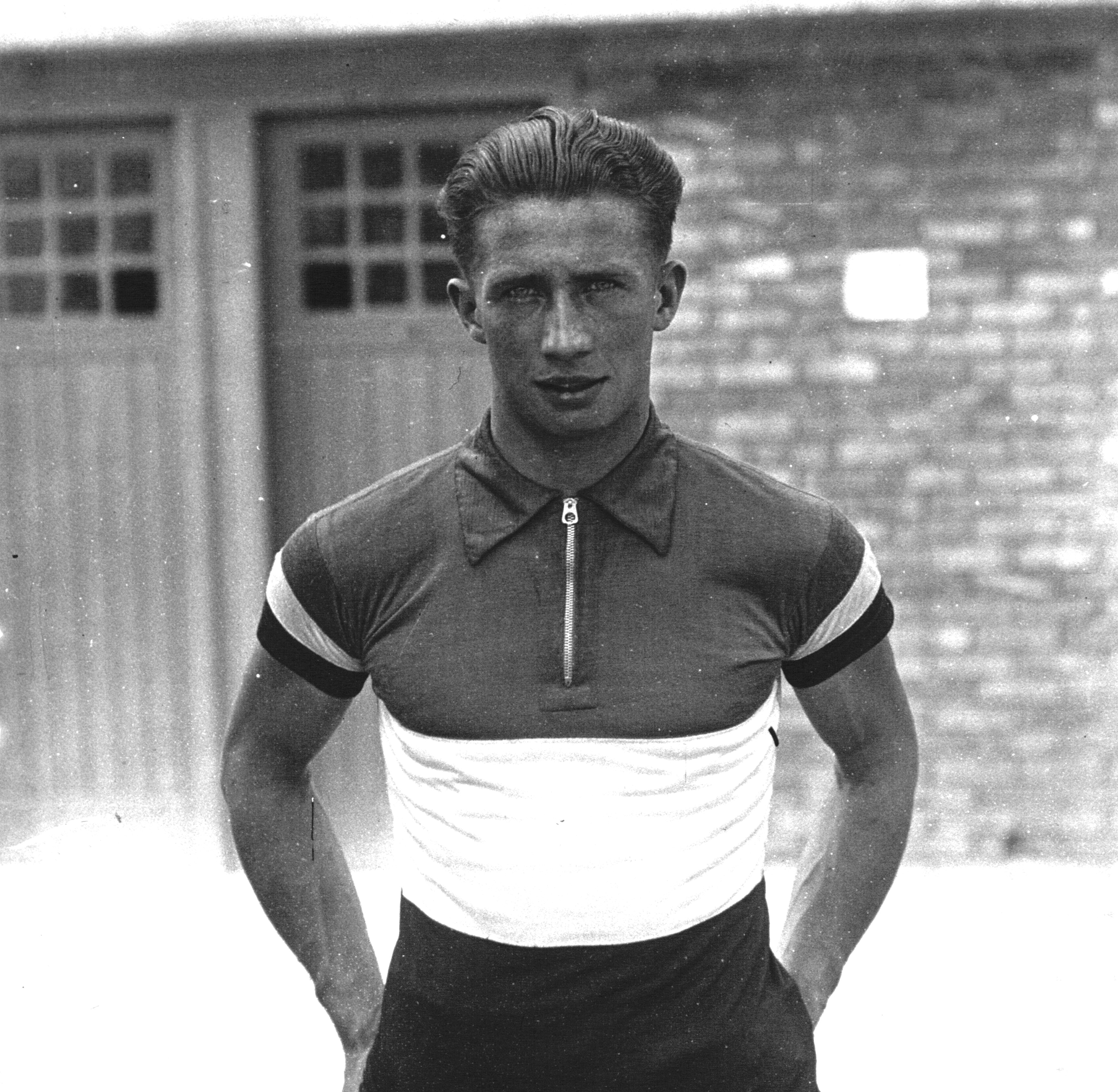
- Gérardin in 1932

Personal information
- Nickname: Toto
- Born: 12 August 1912 Boulogne-Billancourt, France
- Died: 23 May 1982 (aged 69) Paris, France

Cycling career
- Sport: Cycling
- Discipline: Track
- Role: rider
- Rider type: Sprinter

Professional teams
- 1946: La Gazelle
- 1948: Peugeot–Dunlop
- 1949: Follis–Dunlop
Medal record
Men's track cycling
Representing France
World Championships
Gold medal – first place	1930 Brussels	Amateur Sprint
Bronze medal – third place	1934 Leipzig	Sprint
Bronze medal – third place	1935 Brussels	Sprint
Silver medal – second place	1936 Zurich	Sprint
Silver medal – second place	1947 Paris	Sprint
Silver medal – second place	1948 Amsterdam	Sprint

Louis Gérardin (12 August 1912 in Boulogne-Billancourt – 23 May 1982 in Paris) was a French track cyclist.

During his career, he won the World Amateur Sprint Championships in 1930, and was a 12 time national sprint champion.

== Major results ==
1930
1st Amateur World Sprint Championships
1st Grand Prix de Copenhagen
1931
1st National Winter Sprint Championships
1932
1st National Sprint Championships
1935
1st National Sprint Championships
1936
1st National Sprint Championships
1st Grand Prix de l'UVF
1937
1st Grand Prix de l'UVF
1938
1st National Sprint Championships
1938
1st Grand Prix de Paris
1941
1st National Sprint Championships
1st Grand Prix de Paris
1st Grand Prix de l'UVF
1942
1st National Sprint Championships
1943
1st National Sprint Championships
1st Grand Prix de Paris
1945
1st National Sprint Championships
1946
1st National Sprint Championships
1949
1st National Sprint Championships
1950
1st National Sprint Championships
1953
1st National Sprint Championships
