= William Bailey (cyclist) =

British cyclist

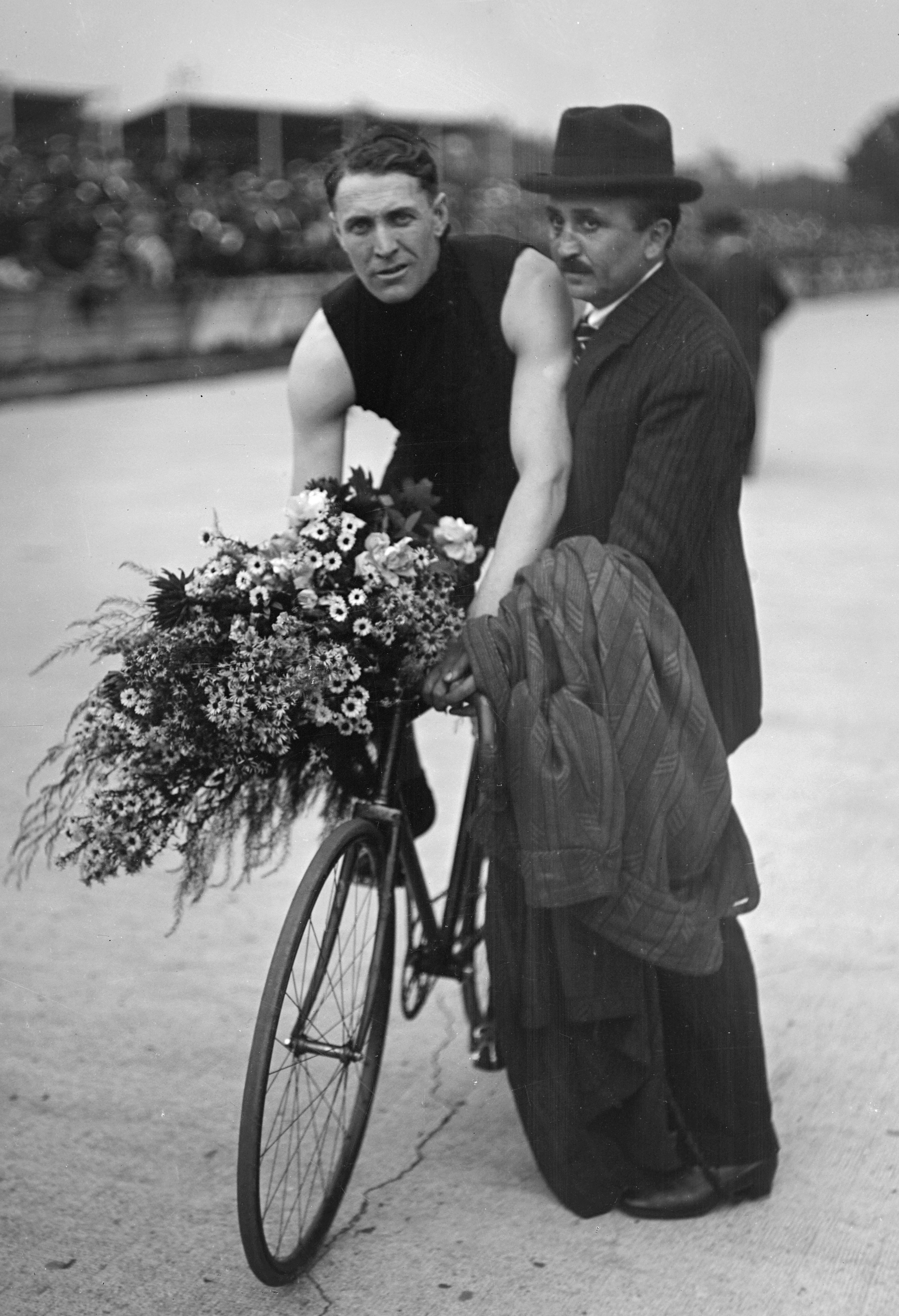
- Bailey at the 1920 Grand Prix de l'UVF, which he won

Personal information
- Born: 6 April 1888 London, England
- Died: 21 February 1971 (aged 82) Chiswick, England

Cycling career
- Sport: Cycling

Amateur team
- Polytechnic Cycling Club, Westminster
Medal record
Representing United Kingdom
UCI Track Cycling World Championships
| Gold medal – first place | 1909 Copenhagen | Sprint, amateur |
| Gold medal – first place | 1910 Brussels | Sprint, amateur |
| Gold medal – first place | 1911 Rome | Sprint, amateur |
| Gold medal – first place | 1913 Berlin | Sprint, amateur |
| Bronze medal – third place | 1920 Antwerp | Sprint, professional |

William James Bailey (6 April 1888 – 21 February 1971) was a British cyclist. He competed in three track sprint events at the 1908 Summer Olympics, but failed to reach the finals.

Bailey competed in cycling for more than 20 years, beyond the age of 40. He then won the national sprint title in 1909, 1912 and 1913, and the world sprint title in 1909–1911 and 1913 (he did not compete in 1912). Bailey turned professional in March 1914, but could not compete due to World War I. In 1920, he won a bronze medal in the sprint at the world championships, and in 1928, aged 40, he set a British sanding start half-mile record at 58 seconds. After retiring from racing he organised competitions and trained cyclists. He prepared the UK team for the 1928 Olympics.
