= Victor Tubbax =

Belgian cyclist

Personal information
- Born: 11 February 1882 Deurne, Belgium
- Died: 24 October 1974 (aged 92) 's-Gravenwezel, Belgium

Sport
- Sport: Cycling
Medal record
Representing Belgium
Motor-paced World Championships
| Silver medal – second place | 1906 Geneva | Amateurs |
| Silver medal – second place | 1907 Paris | Amateurs |

Victor Tubbax (11 February 1882 – 24 October 1974) was a Belgian cyclist. Competing as amateur he won the national championships and finished in second place in the UCI Motor-paced World Championships in 1906 and 1907. He turned professional in 1910.
