= Oerlikon Velodrome =

Velodrome in Zurich, Switzerland

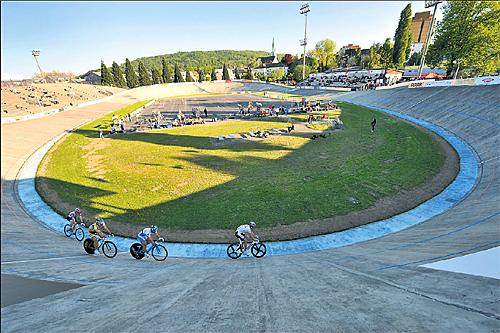
- Interactive map of Oerlikon Velodrome
- Location: Oerlikon, Zürich, Switzerland
- Coordinates: 47.409547°N 8.551279°E
- Capacity: 3000
- Surface: Prestressed concrete

Construction
- Built: 1912

Oerlikon Velodrome is an uncovered velodrome in the Oerlikon district of Zürich, Switzerland. It was built in 1912. The track is 333 m in length and is made of concrete. The velodrome holds 3000 spectators. It held the UCI Track Cycling World Championships in 1923, 1929, 1936, 1946, 1953, 1961 and 1983.

== See also ==
- List of cycling tracks and velodromes
