= Louis Darragon =

French cyclist (1883–1918)

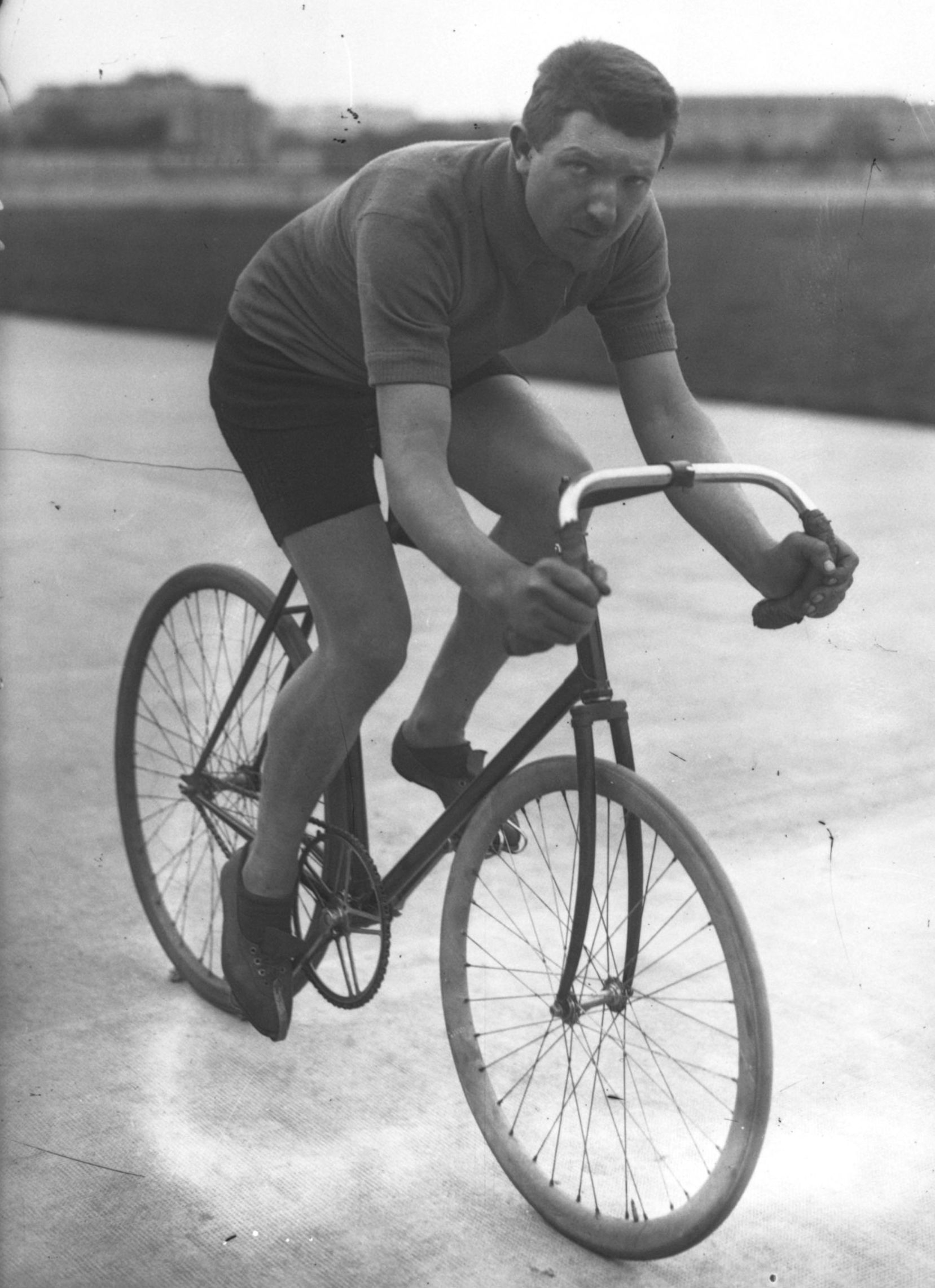
- Louis Darragon in 1913

Personal information
- Born: 6 February 1883 Vichy, France
- Died: 28 April 1918 (aged 35) Paris, France

Sport
- Sport: Cycling
Medal record
Representing France
UCI Motor-paced World Championships
Gold medal – first place	1906 Geneva	Professionals
Gold medal – first place	1907 Paris	Professionals
Silver medal – second place	1909 Copenhagen	Professionals
Silver medal – second place	1911 Rome	Professionals

Louis Darragon (6 February 1883 – 28 April 1918) was a French professional cyclist who won the UCI Motor-paced World Championships in 1906 and 1907 and finished in second place in 1909 and 1911. He died in 1918 during a race at the Vélodrome d'hiver in Paris. The city stadium in his native Vichy is named after him.
