= Robert Spears (cyclist) =

Australian cyclist (1893–1950)

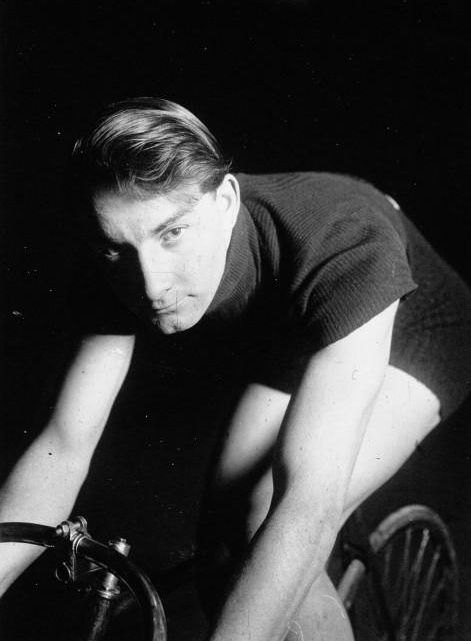
- Robert Spears in 1913

Personal information
- Born: 8 August 1893 Dubbo, Australia
- Died: 5 July 1950 (aged 56) Neuilly-sur-Seine, France

Sport
- Sport: Cycling
Medal record
Representing Australia
Track World Championships
Gold medal – first place	1920 Antwerp	Sprint
Silver medal – second place	1921 Copenhagen	Sprint
Silver medal – second place	1922 Paris	Sprint

Robert Spears (8 August 1893 – 5 July 1950) was an Australian cyclist who was active on the track between 1913 and 1928. He was born in Dubbo, New South Wales and won his first race in the city at the age of fourteen. He won one gold and two silver medals in the sprint at the world championships of 1920–1922. He won six-day races in Melbourne (1913), Newark Velodrome (1915) and Chicago (1916), as well as the Grand Prix de Paris (1920, 1921, 1922) and Grand Prix of Copenhagen (1922, 1925).

In 1985, he was inducted to the Sport Australia Hall of Fame.
