= Lucien Faucheux =

French cyclist

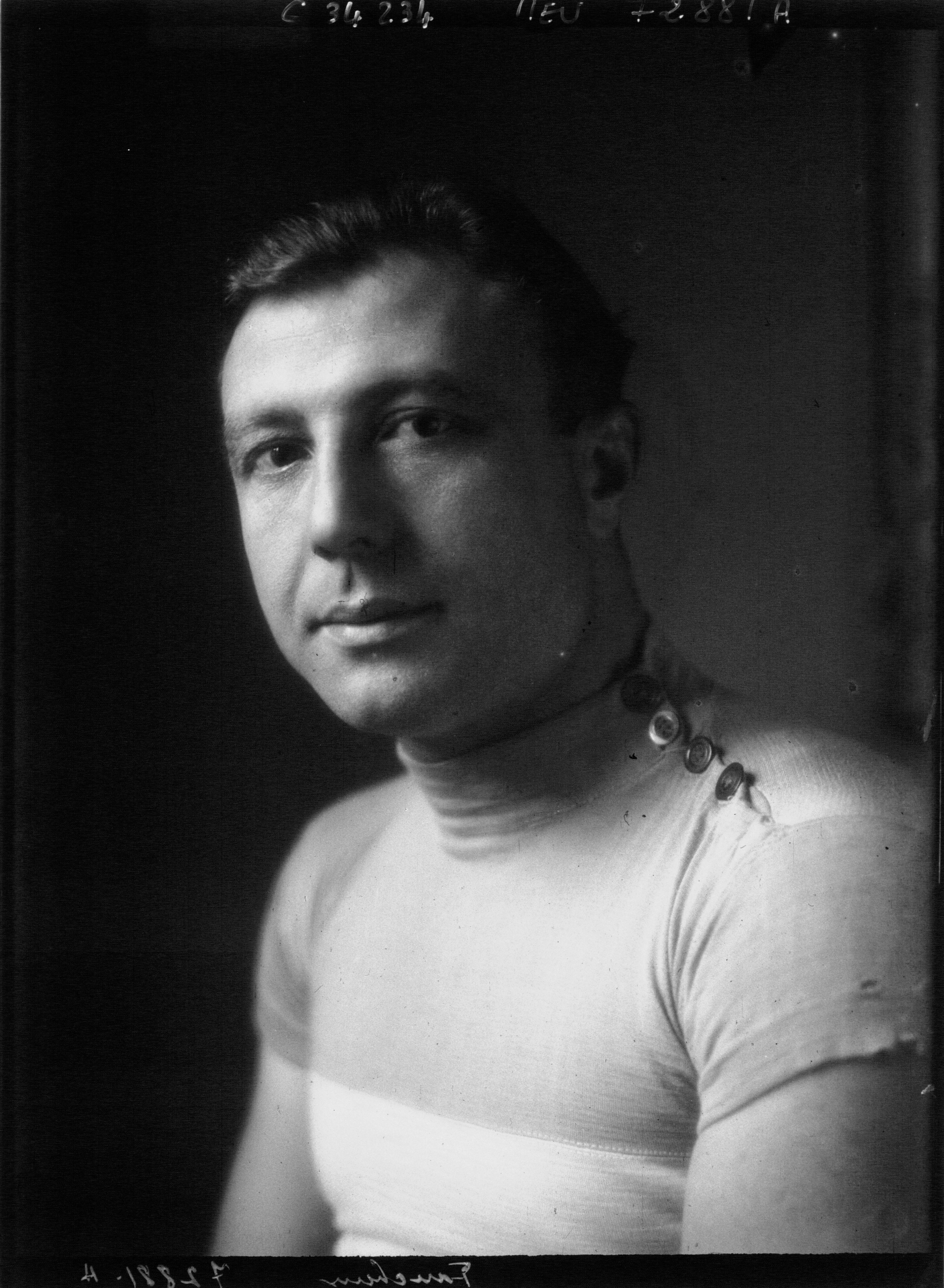
- Faucheux in 1929

Personal information
- Born: 26 August 1899 Le Kremlin-Bicêtre, France
- Died: 22 July 1980 (aged 80) Bordeaux, France

Cycling career
- Sport: Cycling

Lucien Faucheux (26 August 1899 – 22 July 1980) was a French cyclist. He competed in the men's team pursuit event at the 1920 Summer Olympics.
