= Lucien Michard =

French cyclist (1903–1985)

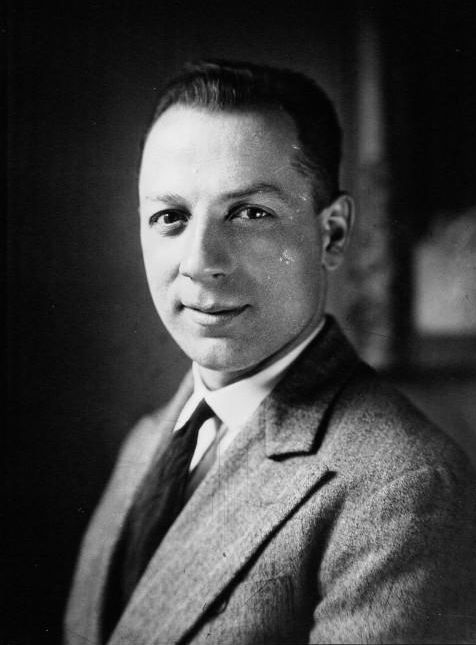
- Michard in 1930

Medal record

Men's track cycling

Representing France

Olympic Games
Gold medal – first place	1924 Paris	Sprint

World Championships
Gold medal – first place	Cologne 1927	Sprint
Gold medal – first place	Budapest 1928	Sprint
Gold medal – first place	Zürich 1929	Sprint
Gold medal – first place	Brussels 1930	Sprint
Silver medal – second place	Copenhagen 1931	Sprint
Silver medal – second place	Rome 1932	Sprint
Silver medal – second place	Paris 1933	Sprint

Lucien Michard (born Épinay-sur-Seine, France, 17 November 1903, died 1 November 1985) was a French racing cyclist and Olympic track champion. He won four successive world championships and lost a fifth even though he crossed the line first. He won a gold medal in the sprint at the 1924 Summer Olympics in Paris.

== Origins ==
Lucien Michard was the son of a garage owner—"a stocky, severe-looking man whose bowler hat could be spotted a mile away"—in the northern Paris suburb of Saint-Denis He worked for his father but spent much of his time training at the Parc des Princes or the Cipale velodrome in Vincennes. He started racing in 1921, winning the Médaille competition for novices at the Vélodrome d'Hiver, "a frail and timid lad of 17...who would dominate the world scene for many years", as René de Latour described him.

He became national sprint champion at 19. In 1924 he won the Olympic sprint, beating Jaap Meijer of the Netherlands, and the world amateur championship, beating Lucien Faucheux of France. He turned professional in 1925. René de Latour wrote in Sporting Cyclist:

I do not think I ever saw a sprinter ride as close as Michard did. By 'close', I mean not losing a bit of shelter provided by opponents much heavier than himself. It was always a beautiful show for connoisseurs to see Michard following the giant Piet Moeskops – big enough to have been a super-heavyweight wrestler – elbow against hip, not losing an inch of protection.

== World championship upset ==
Michard won the world professional championship in four successive years, starting at Cologne in 1927. In fact he won five, but amid unusual circumstances. Michard beat Jef Scherens in the semi-final of the championship at Copenhagen in 1931 and reached the final against the local rider, Willy Falk Hansen. Hansen had, like Michard, won the world sprint championship and Olympic kilometre in 1928, but he was not seen as a contender against Michard.

Michard finished half a metre ahead of Hansen and appeared to have become world champion for a record fifth year. He and Hansen circled the track together and Hansen raised Michard's arm in acknowledgement of victory. Moments later, the announcer said it was Hansen who had won. There was immediate commotion around the chief judge, Alban Collignon, who was president of the Belgian Cycling Association. He quickly realised his mistake.

He had watched the riders start the run to the line and had seen Hansen on the inside of the track and Michard outside him. The winner crossed the line on the inside of the track and Collignon announced him as Hansen. The two riders had, however, changed position and it was Michard who won.

Collignon was willing to change his decision but the rules prevented it. The rule was that the judge's decision, once announced, was final. It was intended to stop riders disputing a result. That was what it prevented for both Hansen and Michard, but the Union Cycliste Internationale hadn't foreseen that a judge might wish to change his mind.

Michard challenged the UCI but the court ruled the event was out of its authority and the UCI did not reverse the decision and Hansen wore the rainbow jersey of world champion for the rest of the year. He wore it in the many revenge matches that he and Michard were contracted to ride around Europe. Michard wore a jersey of his own, showing not rainbow stripes but globes of the world.

The episode ended Michard's career at the top. He was displaced by another little sprinter, Jef Scherens of Belgium, to whom Michard finished second in 1931 and 1933. He did, however, win national championships in 1933, 1934 and 1935, before a strike with other riders against what they saw as poor payments at the Parc des Princes and Vélodrome d'Hiver led to a newspaper campaign which prompted his retirement. He began selling bicycles made under his name and sponsored a professional team in 1939 along with the tyre maker, Hutchinson.

A road is named after him in Aiguillon, where he lived most of his life.

== Achievements ==
- Record 500m flying start: 29" 800, 1932
- Record kilometre flying start: 1' 07" 200, 1931
- Record ½m: 56" 200, 1931
- Record ¾m: 1' 29" 200, 1931
- Record tandem 500m (with Louis Chaillot): 34" 800, 1938
- Record tandem ½m (Chaillot): 52" 800, 1938
- Record tandem ¾m (Chaillot): 1' 08", 1938
- Olympic sprint: 1924
- World championship sprint: 1923 (amateur), 1924 (amateur), 1927, 1928, 1929, 1930
- Coupe d'Europe: 1935
- National sprint champion: 1922, 1924, 1925, 1927, 1928, 1929, 1930, 1933, 1934, 1935
- National sprint champion juniors: 1923, 1924
- National sprint champion military: 1924
- Critérium International: 1936
- Critérium National: 1934, 1936
- Critérium National d'hiver: 1937
- Challenge Victor Goddet: 1932, 1935
- GP Riguelle: 1922
- GP Paris: 1922, 1924, 1930, 1931, 1932, 1935, 1936
- GP UVF: 1924, 1925, 1926, 1928, 1931, 1932
- GP de la République: 1925, 1927, 1929, 1932
- GP de la Toussaint: 1926
- GP Copenhagen: 1927, 1929, 1930
- GP Angoulême: 1928
- GP Clermont: 1928, 1932
- GP UCI: 1929, 1930, 1933, 1937
- GP Brest: 1934
- GP Amiens: 1934, 1935
- GP Reims: 1934
- GP Algiers: 1935
- GP Cologne: 1935
- GP Cognac: 1936
