= Cycling at the 1900 Summer Olympics – Men's sprint (professionals) =

Cycling event during the 1900 Summer Olympics

Men's sprint (professionals) at the Games of the II Olympiad
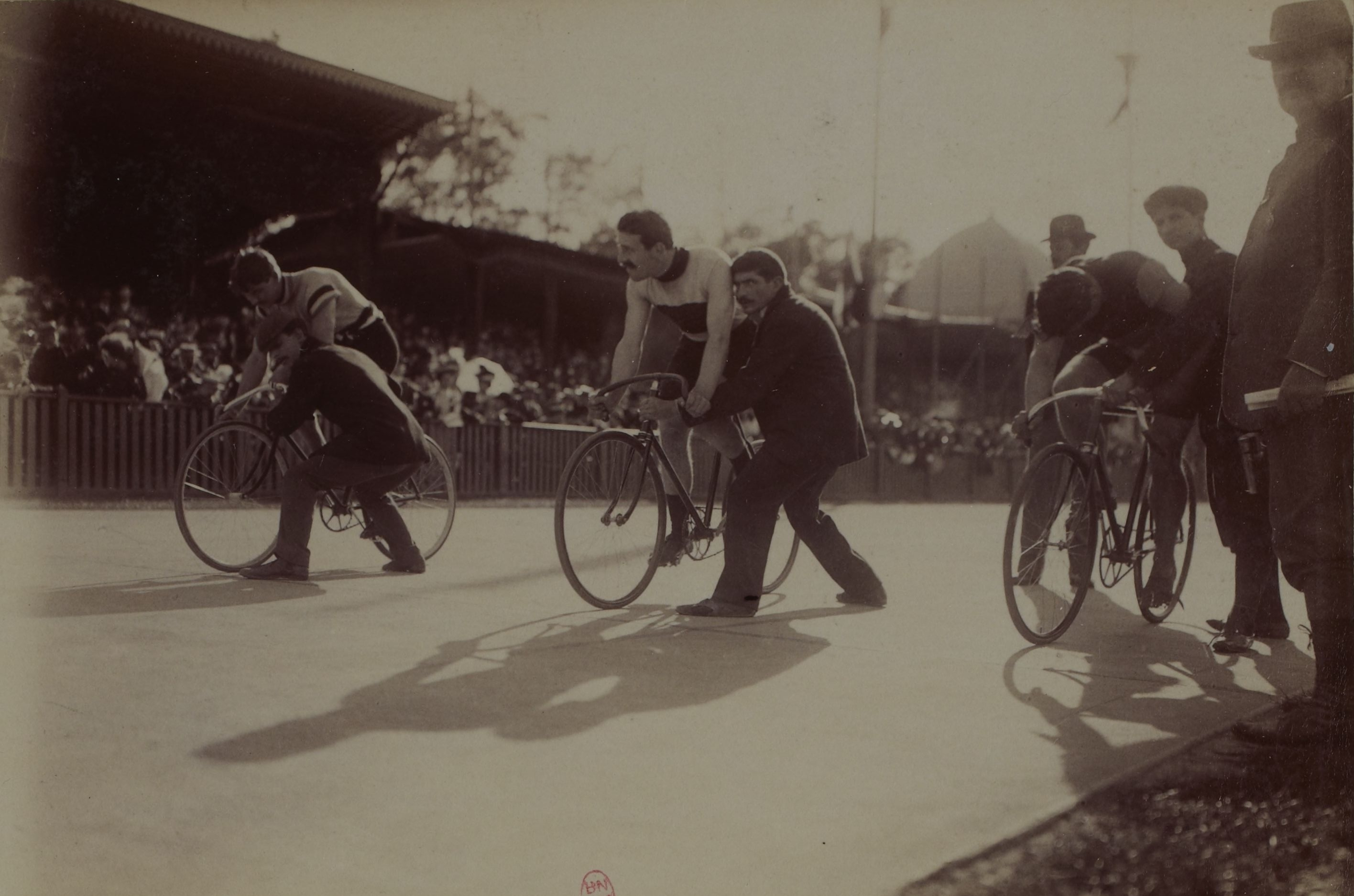
- Start of the final with Harrie Meyers, Tom Cooper and Edmond Jacquelin
- Venue: Vélodrome de Vincennes
- Dates: 9–13 September 1900
- Competitors: 55 from 14 nations

The men's professional sprint was a track cycling event contested at the 1900 Summer Olympics in Paris. It was an event during the 1900 Summer Olympics, but is classified as a non-medal event. The competition was held from 9 to 13 September 1900 at the Vélodrome de Vincennes. The event was contested by 55 professional cyclists from 14 countries.

The first prize was 15,000 francs, with 6,000 francs awarded for second place and 3,000 francs for third. The unusually large prize purse attracted considerable attention in the French sporting press, while a large crowd attended the competition. Edmond Jacquelin and Harry Meijers were among the pre-race favorites, with Anton Huber, Tom Cooper, and Charles Van den Born also highly regarded.

Nowadays, the professional events are not recognized by the International Olympic Committee as official Olympic medal competitions, as only amateur events are classified as medal events. Before July 2021 the IOC has never officially decided which events were "Olympic" and which were not.

== Competition format ==
The large field required seven rounds of competition. The first round consisted of 12 heats, generally containing four or five riders. The first two finishers in each heat advanced to the quarter-finals.

The quarter-finals consisted of eight heats over 1,500 metres. The winner of each heat advanced directly to the semi-finals. Riders who did not qualify through the quarter-finals could continue through a series of repêchage races. The repêchage system eventually produced Paul Bourillon as the additional semi-finalist.

The semi-finals were held on 13 September over 2,000 metres. The winners of the three semi-final heats advanced to the final.

== Results ==
=== Round One ===
Date	9 September 1900
Format	First two finishers in each heat advanced to the quarter-finals. Distance: 1,000 metres.

==== Heat 1 ====
Pos	Competitor	Nation	Time	200 m sprint time	Result
1	Harrie Meyers	Netherlands	2:50.0	13.0	Q
2	Pietro Bixio	Italy	at 2 lengths	–	Q
3	Charles Jue	France	–	–	

==== Heat 2 ====
Pos	Competitor	Nation	Time	200 m sprint time	Result
1	Edmond Jacquelin	France	1:38.8	12.0	Q
2	Charles Brécy	France	at 3 lengths	–	Q
AC	Sydney Jenkins	United Kingdom	–	–	
AC	Umberto Ferrari	Italy	–	–	

==== Heat 3 ====
Pos	Competitor	Nation	Time	200 m sprint time	Result
1	Willy Arend	Germany	1:58.4	12.6	Q
2	Giuseppe Singrossi	Italy	at 1 length	–	Q
AC	Lucien Grognet	France	–	–	
AC	Antonio Oliveira	Brazil	–	–	

==== Heat 4 ====
Pos	Competitor	Nation	Time	200 m sprint time	Result
1	Henri Mayer	Germany	1:57.6	12.6	Q
2	Gian Ferdinando Tommaselli	Italy	at 10 cm	–	Q
AC	Aleksey Butylkin	Russia	–	–	
AC	Virginio Minozzi	Italy	–	–	
AC	Etienne Balajat	France	–	–	

==== Heat 5 ====
Pos	Competitor	Nation	Time	200 m sprint time	Result
1	Floyd McFarland	United States	2:12.4	13.0	Q
2	Jean-Baptiste Louvet	France	-	–	Q
AC	Leclercq	Belgium	–	–	
AC	Léonce Ehrmann	France	–	–	

==== Heat 6 ====
Pos	Competitor	Nation	Time	200 m sprint time	Result
1	Jack Green	United Kingdom	1:41.4	12.6	Q
2	Robert Protin	Belgium	-	–	Q
AC	Gentel	France	–	–	
AC	Van Vught	Belgium	–	–	
AC	Eugène Dirheimer	France	–	–	

==== Heat 7 ====
Pos	Competitor	Nation	Time	200 m sprint time	Result
1	Franz Seidl	Austria	2:04.4	13.0	Q
2	Guus Schilling	Netherlands	–	–	Q
3	Jean Gougoltz	Switzerland	–	–	
4	Bonnevie	France	–	–	

==== Heat 8 ====
Pos	Competitor	Nation	Time	200 m sprint time	Result
1	Anton Huber	Germany	1:58.2	12.8	Q
2	Mathieu Cordang	Netherlands	-	–	Q
AC	Jaap Eden	Netherlands	–	–	
AC	Max Lurion	Austria	–	–	
AC	Van Ackert	Belgium	–	–	

==== Heat 9 ====
Pos	Competitor	Nation	Time	200 m sprint time	Result
1	Paul Bourillon	France	1:45.6	12.2	Q
2	N. Otterbein	Belgium	at 1 length	–	Q
3	Karl Käser	Germany	at 20 metres	–	
4	Arthur Deleu	Belgium	–	–	

==== Heat 10 ====
Pos	Competitor	Nation	Time	200 m sprint time	Result
1	Tom Cooper	United States	1:45.0	12.8	Q
2	Jean Broka	Belgium	-	–	Q
AC	Diego Conelli	Italy	–	–	
AC	Emanuel Kudella	Bohemia	–	–	
AC	Joseph Collomb	France	–	–	

==== Heat 11 ====
Pos	Competitor	Nation	Time	200 m sprint time	Result
1	Charles Van den Born	Belgium	1:51.0	12.6	Q
2	Charles Vanoni	United States	-	–	Q
AC	Gaston Prévost	France	–	–	
AC	Paul Bourotte	France	–	–	
AC	George Sutherland	New Zealand	–	–	

==== Heat 12 ====
Pos	Competitor	Nation	Time	200 m sprint time	Result
1	Louis Grogna	Belgium	1:43.4	12.2	Q
2	Richard Heller	Austria	–	–	Q
AC	Fritz Althof	France	–	–	
AC	Henri Henneberg	Switzerland	–	–	
AC	George Banker	United States	–	–	

=== Quarter-finals ===
Date	9 September 1900
Format	Winners of each heat advanced to the semi-finals. Second-place finishers received 200 FFr. Third-place finishers received 100 FFr. Distance: 1,500 metres.

==== Heat 1 ====
Pos	Competitor	Nation	Time	200 m sprint time	Result
1	Edmond Jacquelin	France	3:07.6	12.6	Q
2	Guus Schilling	Netherlands	at 2 lengths	–	
3	N. Otterbein	Belgium	–	–	

==== Heat 2 ====
Pos	Competitor	Nation	Time	200 m sprint time	Result
1	Harry Meijers	Netherlands	2:57.8	12.8	Q
2	Richard Heller	Austria	–	–	
3	Charles Brécy	France	at 1 length	–	

==== Heat 3 ====
Pos	Competitor	Nation	Time	200 m sprint time	Result
1	Robert Protin	Belgium	3:58.0	12.4	Q
2	Charles Vanoni	United States	-	–	
3	Willy Arend	Germany	at 2 cm	–	

==== Heat 4 ====
Pos	Competitor	Nation	Time	200 m sprint time	Result
1	Floyd McFarland	United States	3:17.0	12.8	Q
2	Jack Green	United Kingdom	–	–	
3	Henri Mayer	Germany	–	–	

==== Heat 5 ====
Pos	Competitor	Nation	Time	200 m sprint time	Result
1	Charles Van den Born	Belgium	3:28.0	12.0	Q
2	Giuseppe Singrossi	Italy	at 2 lengths	–	
3	Jean-Baptiste Louvet	France	–	–	

==== Heat 6 ====
Pos	Competitor	Nation	Time	200 m sprint time	Result
1	Pietro Bixio	Italy	3:51.0	12.2	Q
2	Franz Seidl	Austria	at 3 lengths	–	
3	Jean Broka	Belgium	–	–	

==== Heat 7 ====
Pos	Competitor	Nation	Time	200 m sprint time	Result
1	Anton Huber	Germany	5:24.0	12.2	Q
2	Paul Bourillon	France	at 1 length	–	
3	Gian Ferdinando Tommaselli	Italy	–	–	

==== Heat 8 ====
Pos	Competitor	Nation	Time	200 m sprint time	Result
1	Tom Cooper	United States	3:08.0	12.6	Q
2	Louis Grogna	Belgium	at 1 length	–	
3	Matthieu Cordang	Netherlands	–	–	

=== Repêchage, Preliminary ===
Date	11 September 1900
Format	Winners of each heat advanced to the repêchage semi-finals. Distance: 1,000 metres.

==== Heat 1 ====
Pos	Competitor	Nation	Time	200 m sprint time	Result
1	Willy Arend	Germany	1:32.0	13.0	Q
2	George Sutherland	New Zealand	–	–	
3	Manolo Cervera	Argentina	–	–	
AC	Charles Vanoni	United States	–	–	
AC	Gentel	France	–	–	
AC	Van Vught	Belgium	–	–	

==== Heat 2 ====
Pos	Competitor	Nation	Time	200 m sprint time	Result
1	Franz Seidl	Austria	2:02.2	13.6	Q
2	Lucien Grognet	France	–	–	
3	Paul Bourotte	France	–	–	
4	Guus Schilling	Netherlands	–	–	

==== Heat 3 ====
Pos	Competitor	Nation	Time	200 m sprint time	Result
1	Jack Green	United Kingdom	2:14.6	13.6	Q
2	Richard Heller	Austria	–	–	
3	Umberto Ferrari	Italy	–	–	
AC	Charles Jue	France	–	–	
AC	Leclercq	Belgium	–	–	

==== Heat 4 ====
Pos	Competitor	Nation	Time	200 m sprint time	Result
1	Henri Mayer	Germany	1:37.0	13.2	Q
2	Diego Conelli	Italy	–	–	
3	Jean Gougoltz	Switzerland	–	–	
AC	Victor Thuau	France	–	–	
AC	Henri Henneberg	Switzerland	–	–	

==== Heat 5 ====
Pos	Competitor	Nation	Time	200 m sprint time	Result
1	Gian Ferdinando Tommaselli	Italy	2:27.0	14.0	Q
2	Aleksey Butylkin	Russia	–	–	
3	Antonio Oliveira	Brazil	–	–	

==== Heat 6 ====
Pos	Competitor	Nation	Time	200 m sprint time	Result
1	Jean-Baptiste Louvet	France	1:39.4	13.0	Q
2	Jean Broka	Belgium	–	–	
3	Charles Brécy	France	–	–	
AC	Carl Käser	Germany	–	–	

==== Heat 7 ====
Pos	Competitor	Nation	Time	200 m sprint time	Result
1	George Banker	United States	1:36.0	13.6	Q
2	Arthur Deleu	Belgium	–	–	
3	Gaston Prévost	France	–	–	
AC	Emanuel Kudella	Bohemia	–	–	
AC	Giuseppe Singrossi	Italy	–	–	

==== Heat 8 ====
Pos	Competitor	Nation	Time	200 m sprint time	Result
1	Louis Grogna	Belgium	1:35.0	13.0	Q
2	Matthieu Cordang	Netherlands	–	–	
3	Max Lurion	Austria	–	–	
AC	Joseph Collomb	France	–	–	
AC	N. Otterbein	Belgium	–	–	

==== Heat 9 ====
Pos	Competitor	Nation	Time	200 m sprint time	Result
1	Paul Bourillon	France	1:24.0	13.0	Q
2	Sydney Jenkins	United Kingdom	–	–	
3	Léonce Ehrmann	France	–	–	
4	Bonnevie	France	–	–	

=== Repêchage, Semi-finals ===
Date	11 September 1900
Format	Winners of each heat advanced to the repêchage final. Distance: 1,000 metres.

==== Heat 1 ====
Pos	Competitor	Nation	Time	200 m sprint time	Result
1	Willy Arend	Germany	2:07.6	12.0	Q
2	Gian Ferdinando Tommaselli	Italy	-	–	
3	Jean-Baptiste Louvet	France	–	–	

==== Heat 2 ====
Pos	Competitor	Nation	Time	200 m sprint time	Result
1	Jack Green	United Kingdom	2:28.2	14.0	Q
2	Louis Grogna	Belgium	-	–	
3	Franz Seidl	Austria	–	–	

==== Heat 3 ====
Pos	Competitor	Nation	Time	200 m sprint time	Result
1	Paul Bourillon	France	1:43.8	13.8	Q
2	Henri Mayer	Germany	-	–	
3	George Banker	United States	–	–	

=== Repêchage, Final ===
Date	11 September 1900

==== Heat 1 ====
Pos	Competitor	Nation	Time	200 m sprint time	Result
1	Paul Bourillon	France	1:41.4	12.6	Q
2	Jack Green	United Kingdom	at one wheel	–	
DQ	Willy Arend	Germany	–	–	Disqualified

=== Semi-finals ===
Cooper's victory over Van den Born in the third semi-final was an upset, with Cooper defeating the Belgian by half a length. In the first semi-final, Jacquelin defeated American Floyd McFarland, while Meijers won the second semi-final against Bourillon.

Date	13 September 1900
Format	Winners of each heat advanced to the final. Distance: 2,000 metres.

==== Heat 1 ====
Pos	Competitor	Nation	Time	200 m sprint time	Purse	Result
1	Edmond Jacquelin	France	4:26.4	12.2	–	Q
2	Floyd McFarland	United States	at 5 lengths	–	500 FFr.	
3	Pietro Bixio	Italy	at 1 length	–	300 FFr.	

==== Heat 2 ====
Pos	Competitor	Nation	Time	200 m sprint time	Purse	Result
1	Harrie Meyers	Netherlands	4:17.2	12.2	–	Q
2	Paul Bourillon	France	at 3 lengths	–	500 FFr.	
3	Robert Protin	Belgium	–	–	300 FFr.	

==== Heat 3 ====
Pos	Competitor	Nation	Time	200 m sprint time	Purse	Result
1	Tom Cooper	United States	4:20.0	12.0	–	Q
2	Charles Van den Born	Belgium	at ½ length	–	500 FFr.	
3	Anton Huber	Germany	at 1 length	–	300 FFr.	

=== Final ===
Finish of the final with Harrie Meyers outsprinting Tom Cooper and Edmond Jacquelin

In the final, Cooper led during the strategic run-up to the final sprint. Meijers passed him as the sprint began and won comfortably. Jacquelin followed Cooper but was unable to overtake him. Jacquelin later attributed his defeat to the wind. He said that he had changed his transmission from 8 to 7½ because of the conditions, which he believed prevented him from winning.

Date	13 September 1900

Pos	Competitor	Nation	Time / Margin	Purse
1	Harrie Meyers	Netherlands	4:32.4	15,000 FFr.
2	Tom Cooper	United States	at ½ length	6,000 FFr.
3	Edmond Jacquelin	France	at ½ length	3,000 FFr.
