= Cycling at the 1900 Summer Olympics – Men's tandem sprint =

Cycling event during the 1900 Summer Olympics

Men's tandem sprint (professionals) at the Games of the II Olympiad
- Venue: Vélodrome de Vincennes
- Dates: 10 September 1900
- Competitors: 54 from 14 nations

The men's professional tandem sprint was a track cycling event contested at the 1900 Summer Olympics in Paris. It was an event during the 1900 Summer Olympics, but is classified as a non-medal event. The competition was held on 10 September 1900 at the Vélodrome de Vincennes. The event was contested by 54 professional cyclists from 14 countries.

The competition featured 27 tandems from 13 countries. The heats and semi-finals were raced over 1,000 metres, while the final was held over 2,000 metres.

The American tandem of Tom Cooper and Floyd McFarland was regarded as one of the strongest teams, but they were eliminated in the third semi-final. The semi-final was won by the mixed Dutch-Italian tandem of Harrie Meyers and Gian Ferdinando Tommaselli.

In the final, Meijers and Tommaselli defeated the mixed German-Austrian tandem of Anton Huber and Franz Seidl. The French tandem of Edmond Jacquelin and Jean-Baptiste Louvet finished third.

Nowadays, the professional events are not recognized by the International Olympic Committee as official Olympic medal competitions, as only amateur events are classified as medal events. Before July 2021 the IOC has never officially decided which events were "Olympic" and which were not.

== Competition format ==
The large field required nine heats in the first round, with three tandems in each heat. The winner of each heat advanced to one of the three semi-finals. The heats and semi-finals were contested over 1,000 metres, while the final was raced over 2,000 metres.

The three semi-final winners advanced directly to the final.

== Results ==
=== Round One ===
Date	10 September 1900
Format	Winners of each heat advanced to the semi-finals. Distance: 1,000 metres.

==== Heat 1 ====
Pos	Tandem	Nation	200 m sprint time	Time	Result
1	Etienne Balajat / Andrea Chiozza	Mixed team	12.8	1:40.0	Q
2	Antonio Oliveira / Manolo Cervera	Mixed team	–	at 1 length	
DNF	Charles Vanoni / Robert Protin	Mixed team	–	–	DNF

==== Heat 2 ====
Pos	Tandem	Nation	200 m sprint time	Time	Result
1	Pietro Bixio / Giuseppe Singrossi	Italy	11.6	1:34.8	Q
2	Charles Albert Brécy / Gentel	France	–	at ¼ wheel	
3	Depege / Arthur Deleu	Belgium	–	–	

==== Heat 3 ====
Pos	Tandem	Nation	200 m sprint time	Time	Result
1	Willy Arend / George Banker	Mixed team	11.0	1:23.6	Q
2	Jean Gougoltz / Mathieu Cordang	Mixed team	–	–	
DNF	Rollin / Longé	France	–	–	DNF

==== Heat 4 ====
Pos	Tandem	Nation	200 m sprint time	Time	Result
1	Harrie Meyers / Gian Ferdinando Tomaselli	Mixed team	11.6	1:31.8	Q
2	Paul Ruinart / Henri Henneberg	Mixed team	–	at 1 wheel	
3	Gaston Prévost / Joseph Collomb	France	–	–	

==== Heat 5 ====
Pos	Tandem	Nation	200 m sprint time	Time	Result
1	Edmond Jacquelin / Jean-Baptiste Louvet	France	11.8	1:32.4	Q
2	Richard Heller / Max Lurion	Austria	–	–	
3	Divet / Bernard	France	–	–	

==== Heat 6 ====
Pos	Tandem	Nation	200 m sprint time	Time	Result
1	Virginio Minozzi / Diego Conelli	Italy	11.6	1:29.6	Q
2	Jean Broka / Louis Grogna	Belgium	–	at ½ length	
3	Léonce Ehrmann / Victor Thuau	France	–	bad third	

==== Heat 7 ====
Pos	Tandem	Nation	200 m sprint time	Time	Result
1	Anton Huber / Franz Seidl	Mixed team	12.2	1:24.2	Q
2	José Soler / Ségur	Mixed team	–	–	
3	Jack Robertson / Paul Rugère	Mixed team	–	–	

==== Heat 8 ====
Pos	Tandem	Nation	200 m sprint time	Time	Result
1	Jack Green / Sydney Jenkins	United Kingdom	11.8	1:23.2	Q
2	Carl Käser / Emanuel Kudela	Mixed team	–	at 1 wheel	
3	Lucien Grognet / Aleksey Butylkin	Mixed team	–	–	

==== Heat 9 ====
Pos	Tandem	Nation	200 m sprint time	Time	Result
1	Tom Cooper / Floyd McFarland	United States	12.6	1:27.4	Q
2	Paul Bourotte / Honoré Fossier	France	–	–	
3	Henri Mayer / Umberto Ferrari	Mixed team	–	–	

=== Semi-finals ===
Date	10 September 1900
Format	Winners of each heat advanced to the final. Distance: 1,000 metres.

==== Heat 1 ====
Pos	Tandem	Nation	200 m sprint time	Time	Result
1	Edmond Jacquelin / Jean-Baptiste Louvet	France	11.8	1:38.8	Q
2	Pietro Bixio / Giuseppe Singrossi	Italy	–	at 10 centimetres	
3	Jack Green / Sydney Jenkins	United Kingdom	–	–	

==== Heat 2 ====
Pos	Tandem	Nation	200 m sprint time	Time	Result
1	Anton Huber / Franz Seidl	Mixed team	12.2	1:37.6	Q
2	Virginio Minozzi / Diego Conelli	Italy	–	–	
3	Etienne Balajat / Andrea Chiozza	Mixed team	–	–	

==== Heat 3 ====
Pos	Tandem	Nation	200 m sprint time	Time	Result
1	Harrie Meyers / Gian Ferdinando Tommaselli	Mixed team	11.2	1:34.2	Q
2	Willy Arend / George Banker	Mixed team	–	at 1 wheel	
3	Tom Cooper / Floyd McFarland	United States	–	at ½ wheel	

=== Final ===
Date	10 September 1900

Pos	Tandem	Nation	200 m sprint time	Time
1	Harrie Meyers / Gian Ferdinando Tommaselli	Mixed team	11.4	3:16.0
2	Anton Huber / Franz Seidl	Mixed team	–	–
3	Edmond Jacquelin / Jean-Baptiste Louvet	France	–	–
