= Cycling at the 1900 Summer Olympics – Men's 3,000 metres handicap =

Professional cycling event during the 1900 Summer Olympics

Men's 3,000 metres (handicap, professionals) at the Games of the II Olympiad
- Venue: Vélodrome de Vincennes
- Dates: 10–14 September 1900
- Competitors: 67 from 14 nations

The men's professional 3,000 metres handicap was a track cycling event contested at the 1900 Summer Olympics in Paris. It was an event during the 1900 Summer Olympics, but is classified as a non-medal event. The competition was held from 10 to 14 September 1900 at the Vélodrome de Vincennes. The event was contested by 67 professional cyclists from 14 countries.

The 67 starters were divided into three heats, with the top four finishers in each heat advancing to the final on the last day of the professional programme. The highest-ranked rider was Dutchman Harrie Meyers, who started from the 5-metre mark. Handicaps ranged up to 300 metres. The final was won by Pierre Chevalier, who started with a 235-metre handicap, the third-largest handicap among the finalists. Chevalier received 600 francs for the victory, while runner-up Moussier received 400 francs.

Nowadays, the professional events are not recognized by the International Olympic Committee as official Olympic medal competitions, as only amateur events are classified as medal events. Before July 2021 the IOC has never officially decided which events were "Olympic" and which were not.

== Competition format ==
The first round consisted of three heats. The top four finishers in each heat advanced to the final round.

== Results ==
=== Round One ===
Date	10 September 1900
Format	Four top finishers in each heat advanced to the final round.

==== Heat 1 ====
Pos	Competitor	Nation	Time	Handicap	Result
1	Paul Dangla	France	3:50.4	190 m	Q
2	Pierre Chevalier	France	–	235 m	Q
3	Charles Jue	France	–	225 m	Q
4	André	France	–	280 m	Q
AC	Edmond Jacquelin	France	–	scratch	
AC	Jack Green	United Kingdom	–	10 m	
AC	Floyd McFarland	United States	–	15 m	
AC	Giuseppe Singrossi	Italy	–	20 m	
AC	Jean Broka	Belgium	–	25 m	
AC	Sydney Jenkins	United Kingdom	–	25 m	
AC	Carl Käser	Germany	–	30 m	
AC	Jean Gougoltz	Switzerland	–	40 m	
AC	Emanuel Kudela	Bohemia	–	50 m	
AC	Jan Mulder	Netherlands	–	55 m	
AC	Charles Vanoni	United States	–	65 m	
AC	Paul Bourotte	France	–	75 m	
AC	Leclercq	Belgium	–	90 m	
AC	Van Ackert	Belgium	–	95 m	
AC	Van Vught	Belgium	–	100 m	
AC	Paul Ruinart	France	–	100 m	
AC	N. Otterbein	Belgium	–	150 m	
AC	Léonce Ehrmann	France	–	160 m	
AC	Andrea Chiozza	Italy	–	175 m	

==== Heat 2 ====
Pos	Competitor	Nation	Time	Handicap	Result
1	José Soler	Spain	3:50.6	300 m	Q
2	Ségur	France	at 1 length	200 m	Q
3	Merle	France	very near	215 m	Q
4	Charles Brécy	France	very near	150 m	Q
AC	Willy Arend	Germany	–	5 m	
AC	Tom Cooper	United States	–	10 m	
AC	Charles Van den Born	Belgium	–	10 m	
AC	Gian Ferdinando Tommaselli	Italy	–	15 m	
AC	Jaap Eden	Netherlands	–	15 m	
AC	Jean-Baptiste Louvet	France	–	–	
AC	Joseph Collomb	France	–	100 m	
AC	Etienne Balajat	France	–	120 m	
AC	Bonnevie	France	–	160 m	
AC	Honoré Fossier	France	–	175 m	
AC	Cintray	UNK	–	225 m	
AC	Manolo Cervera	Argentina	–	240 m	
AC	Boyer	France	–	265 m	
AC	Simmoneau	UNK	–	280 m	

==== Heat 3 ====
Pos	Competitor	Nation	Time	Handicap	Result
1	Moussier	France	3:58.6	220 m	Q
2	Gaston Prévost	France	–	50 m	Q
3	Harrie Meyers	Netherlands	–	5 m	Q
4	Victor Thuau	France	–	110 m	Q
AC	Anton Huber	Germany	–	10 m	
AC	Louis Grogna	Belgium	–	20 m	
AC	Robert Protin	Belgium	–	25 m	
AC	George Banker	United States	–	30 m	
AC	Mathieu Cordang	Netherlands	–	35 m	
AC	Guus Schilling	Netherlands	–	40 m	
AC	Eugène Dirheimer	France	–	55 m	
AC	Henri Henneberg	Switzerland	–	65 m	
AC	George Sutherland	New Zealand	–	70 m	
AC	Umberto Ferrari	Italy	–	80 m	
AC	Antonio Oliveira	Brazil	–	100 m	
AC	Gentel	France	–	135 m	
AC	Rollin	France	–	160 m	
AC	Paul Rugère	France	–	170 m	
AC	Charlier	France	–	180 m	
AC	Lucien Grognet	France	–	200 m	
AC	Charnay	France	–	215 m	
AC	Leymarie	France	–	230 m	
AC	Paquette	France	–	250 m	
AC	Leroy	UNK	–	270 m	
AC	Albert Champion	France	–	290 m	
AC	Marcel Goven	France	–	300 m	

=== Final ===
Date	14 September 1900

Pos	Competitor	Nation	Time	Handicap	Purse
1	Pierre Chevalier	France	3:47.2	235 m	600 FFr.
2	Moussier	France	–	220 m	400 FFr.
3	Charles Jue	France	–	225 m	200 FFr.
4	Paul Dangla	France	–	190 m	100 FFr.
5	Charles Brécy	France	–	150 m	50 FFr.
AC	Harrie Meyers	Netherlands	–	5 m	50 FFr.
AC	Gaston Prévost	France	–	50 m	50 FFr.
AC	Victor Thuau	France	–	110 m	50 FFr.
AC	Ségur	France	–	200 m	50 FFr.
AC	Merle	France	–	215 m	50 FFr.
AC	André	France	–	280 m	50 FFr.
AC	José Soler	Spain	–	300 m	50 FFr.
