= Cycling at the 1900 Summer Olympics =

Cycling at the Games of the II Olympiad
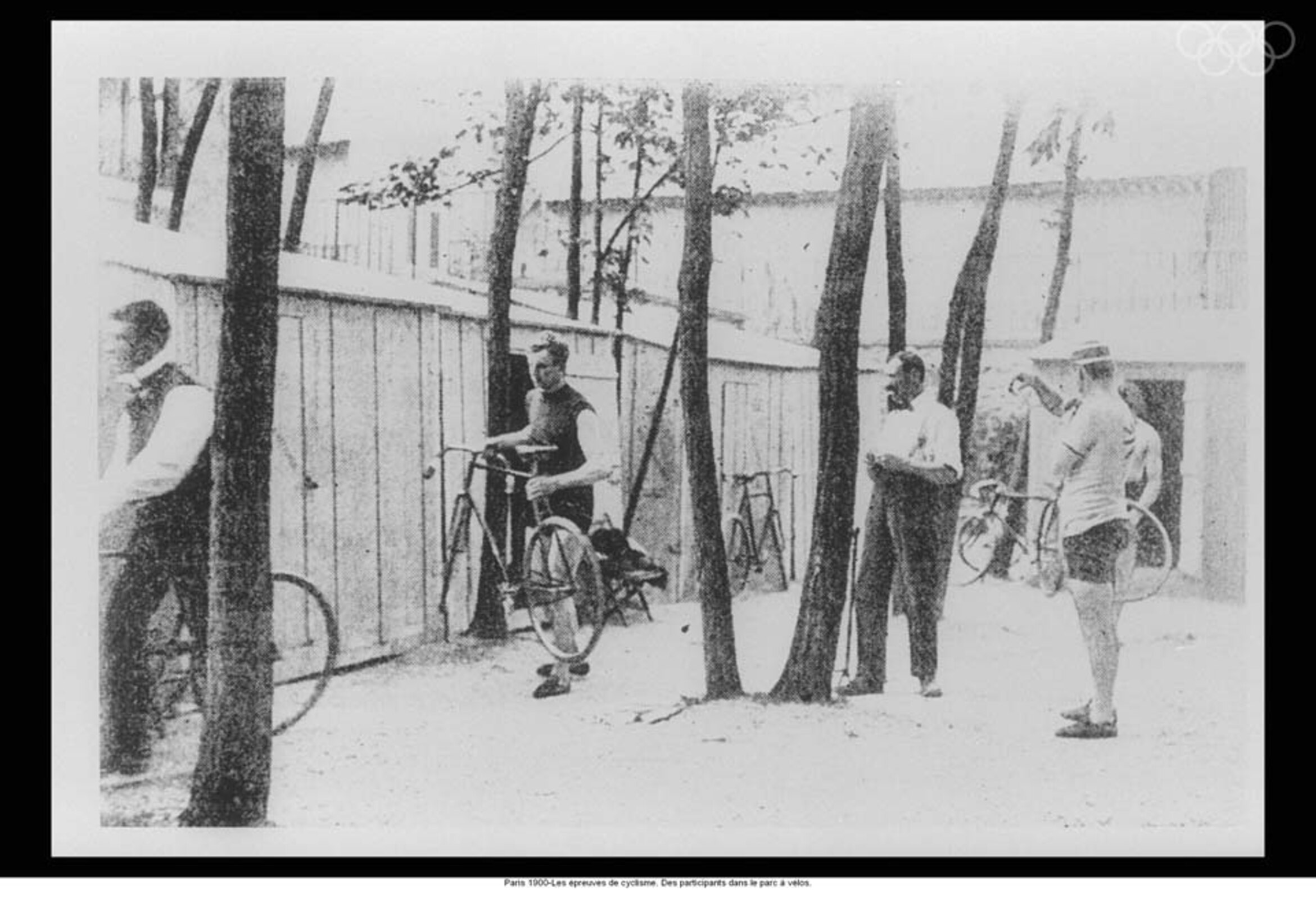
- Olympic cyclists in 1900
- Venues: Vélodrome de Vincennes
- Date: 11 –15 September 1900
- Competitors: 72 from 7 nations

The 1900 Summer Olympics were held as part of the 1900 World's Fair, during which many cycling events were contested. The IOC website currently affirms a total of 3 medal events, after accepting, as it appears, the recommendation of Olympic historian Bill Mallon regarding events that should be considered "Olympic". These additional events include the men's points race. Thus, three cycling events are considered Olympic events. These three competitions were held between 9 September and 16 September 1900. The cycling part of the World's Fair included 250 competitors, 160 of them French. In the sprint and 25 km events, 72 competitors, all men, from seven nations competed.

== Medal summary ==
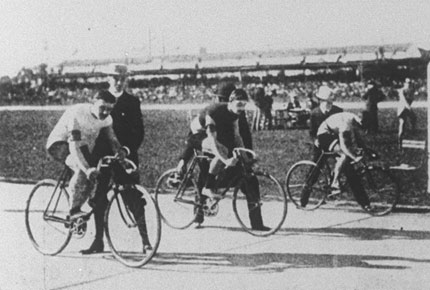
Sprint race.

| Games | Gold | Silver | Bronze |
|---|---|---|---|
| sprint | Georges Taillandier (FRA) | Fernand Sanz (FRA) | John Henry Lake (USA) |
| 25 kilometres | Louis Bastien (FRA) | Lloyd Hildebrand (FRA) | Auguste Daumain (FRA) |
| points race | Enrico Brusoni (ITA) | Karl Duill (GER) | Louis Trousselier (FRA) |

== Daily summary ==
=== 11 September ===
- In the first two rounds of the 2000 metre sprint, the United States and Italy made their cycling debuts, as did the Olympic-debut nations Belgium and Bohemia. Germany, which had won a silver medal four years earlier, and France, with 4 golds, a silver, and a bronze, were the returning nations.
- Bohemia's lone cyclist was eliminated in the first round. The Belgian cyclist was eliminated in the second round of the day, the quarterfinals. Germany's trio fared no better, with all having dropped out by the end of the day. Antonio Restelli was the only one of Italy's 7 to move on. He was joined by the sole American John Henry Lake and by 7 Frenchmen.

=== 13 September ===
- The semifinals and the final of the sprint were held on the 13th.
- The semifinal round pared the 9 remaining cyclists down to 3, with the winners of each of the semifinals guaranteed a medal in the three-man final. Restelli took second place to Fernand Sanz, dropping Italy from contention. Lake won his semifinal, joining Sanz and Georges Taillandier in the final.
- Taillandier and Sanz reaffirmed French dominance of the sport, taking the top two spots in the final. Lake took the United States' first medal in cycling.

=== 15 September ===
- The 25 kilometres was held on the 15th. Frenchman Louis Bastien, Briton Louis Hildebrand, and American Lake were the primary contenders, with Bastien the favorite. Lake was unable to keep pace with Hildebrand, however, and dropped out of the race. Bastien won, followed by Hildebrand and Auguste Daumain. Future Tour de France winner Louis Trousselier was among the rest of the pack.
- The amateur points race, or "Course de Primes", was also held on 15 September. It was a 5 kilometre race — 10 laps of the track — with points awarded at the end of each lap.

== Participating nations ==
A total of 72 cyclists from 7 nations competed at the sprint and 25 km cycling events during the Paris Games:

- Belgium (1)
- Bohemia (1)
- France (59)
- Germany (3)
- Italy (7)
- United States (1)

== Medal table ==
| Rank | Nation | Gold | Silver | Bronze | Total |
|---|---|---|---|---|---|
| 1 | France | 2 | 2 | 2 | 6 |
| 2 | Italy | 1 | 0 | 0 | 1 |
| 3 | Germany | 0 | 1 | 0 | 1 |
| 4 | United States | 0 | 0 | 1 | 1 |
| Totals (4 entries) | | 3 | 3 | 3 | 9 |

== Non-medal events ==
In 1900, there was no official distinction between Olympic events and non-Olympic events held during the Exposition Universelle (1900). Most events were open for all cyclists. The cycling events satisfying all of these criteria—restricted to amateurs, open to all nations, open to all competitors and without handicapping—are now regarded as Olympic events. Before July 2021 the IOC has never decided which events were "Olympic" and which were not. Other events were:

| Games | First | Second | Third |
|---|---|---|---|
| sprint (professionals) | Harrie Meyers (NED) | Tom Cooper (USA) | Edmond Jacquelin (FRA) |
| sprint (professionals #2) | Mathieu Cordang (NED) | Paul Bourotte (FRA) | Victor Thuau (FRA) |
| tandem sprint (professionals) | Harrie Meyers (NED); Gian Ferdinando Tomaselli (ITA) | Anton Huber (GER); Franz Seidl (AUT) | Edmond Jacquelin (FRA); Jean-Baptiste Louvet (FRA) |
| team sprint (professionals) | United States; Tom Cooper; Floyd MacFarland; George Banker | France; Edmond Jacquelin; Paul Bourillon; Jean-Baptiste Louvet | Italy; Gian Ferdinando Tomaselli; Pietro Bixio; Giuseppe Singrossi |
| points race (professionals) | Floyd MacFarland (USA) | Mathieu Cordang (NED) | Paul Bourotte (FRA) |
| 50 kilometres (professionals) | Thaddäus Robl (GER) | Piet Dickentman (NED) | Émile Bouhours (FRA) |
| 100 kilometres (professionals) | Arthur Chase (GBR) | Émile Bouhours (FRA) | Edouard Taylor (FRA) |
| 100 miles (professionals) | Edouard Taylor (FRA) | Albert Walters (GBR) | Émile Bouhours (FRA) |
| Bol d'Or 24-hours race (professionals) | Mathieu Cordang (NED) | Thaddäus Robl (GER) | César Garin (FRA) |
| 3,000 metres handicap (professionals) | Pierre Chevalier (FRA) | Moussier (FRA) | Charles Jue (FRA) |
| 25 kilometres motor-paced (professionals) | César Simar (FRA) | Lucien Lesna (SUI) | Paul Bor (FRA) |
| national team sprint (professionals) | France; Pierre Chevalier; Rollin | France; Moussier; Roudon | France; Merle; Mille |
