= Franz Seidl =

Austrian track cyclist, automobile racer and aviation pioneer (1879 – 1913)

- Seidl in 1900

Personal information
- Full name: Franz Georg Seidl
- Nationality: Austria
- Born: 8 November 1879 Vienna, Austria
- Died: 10 June 1913 (aged 33) Maria Enzersdorf, Austria

Cycling career
- Sport: Cycling
- Discipline: Track cycling
- Role: Rider

Amateur team
- 1895–1897: Individual

Professional team
- 1898–1903: Individual
Medal record
Men's track cycling
Representing Austria
Summer Olympics
Second place	1900 Paris	tandem sprint

Seidl on the tandem with Bruno Büchner (1902)

Grave of Seidl at Inzersdorf Cemetery in Vienna

Franz Georg Seidl (8 November 1879 – 10 June 1913) was an Austrian track cyclist, automobile racer, and aviation pioneer.

In his era, Seidl ranked among the most successful cyclists worldwide, recording 40 victories in races held between 1896 and 1903 and earning 15,407.50 marks. He turned to automobile racing in 1903 before pursuing aviation. He died in 1913 while being transported to hospital after crashing while approaching an airfield.

== Biography ==
As a cyclist, Franz Seidl was a student of the Graz Training School. At the age of 16, he successfully competed in his first races as an amateur. He became a professional in 1898. Between 1896 and 1903, he achieved a total of 40 first places, 30 second places, and 15 third places on German cycling tracks, placing fourth among foreign riders. His total earnings during this period amounted to 15,407.50 marks.

Seidl mainly competed at the cycling track in Vienna, and predominantly in multi-rider events. He was particularly successful in tandem racing, initially riding alongside Bruno Büchner and later with Anton Huber. His most significant victory came in 1899 at the Kurfürstendamm cycling track in Berlin, where he won the Grand Prix of Germany ahead of Willy Arend.

He participated in the 1900 Summer Olympics in four professional cycling events. He finished second in the tandem sprint event together with Anton Huber, behind Harrie Meyers and Gian Ferdinando Tommaselli. He also competed in the sprint event and team sprint event. Nowadays, these events are not recognized by the International Olympic Committee as official Olympic medal competitions, as only the amateur events are recognized as official medal events.

In 1903, Seidl switched to automobile racing and competed in races on behalf of brewery owner Anton Dreher, before turning his attention to aviation. He joined the Austro-Hungarian Aircraft Works (Österreichisch-ungarischen Autoplanwerke) and became a flying student of Adolf Warchalowski. During a flight from Vienna to Wiener Neustadt, he was a passenger of Josef Sablatnig. The aircraft caught fire, and both occupants suffered burns. He subsequently joined the Motorluftfahrzeuggesellschaft of Karl Illner in Aspern, where he also managed a flying school.

On 10 June 1913, he took off from Wiener Neustadt heading towards Aspern, where a flying meeting was scheduled to take place the following day. While approaching the airfield, Seidl crashed, due to a gust of wind, apparently because he had flown a turn too tightly, and sustained multiple serious injuries. He died while being transported to a hospital in Maria Enzersdorf.
