= Edouard Taylor =

French track cyclist (1880–1903)

- Taylor in 1900

Personal information
- Born: Edward Henry Taylor; 18 June 1880 Paris, France
- Died: 24 September 1903 (aged 23) Le Perreux-sur-Marne, France

Cycling career
- Sport: Cycling
- Discipline: Track cycling
- Role: Rider

Major wins
- (France) French champion in motor-paced racing (1899) professional 100 miles race at the 1900 Paris Olympic Games

Edward Henry "Edouard" Taylor (18 June 1880 – 24 September 1903) was a French track cyclist. He became a professional on French tracks and then traveled to the United States. He competed internationally against other top cyclists in the late 1890s and won the French National Track Championships in 1899.

== Biography ==
Taylorwas born in 10th arrondissement of Paris to English parents and grew up there.

Taylor began his career at the age of 15, managed by Cuthbert Waddy. His first success came in August 1896 in the Paris-Cabourg race. That same year, he became a professional and made his debut at the first Vélodrome d'Hiver, where he performed creditably in motor-paced events. The public nicknamed him Le Gosse Rouge ("The Red Kid") because of the color of his jersey.

In 1897 and 1898, he spent several months racing in the United States. The 1899 season was his best: Taylor won several major prizes as a stayer, became French champion and, for the first time, set a record for the kilometre in one minute behind a pacer. He competed successively against all the leading riders in his specialty, including Jimmy Michael, Harry Elkes, Albert Champion, Émile Bouhours, Constant Huret, Tom Linton, Alphonse Baugé, Fred Armstrong, Albert Walters, Lucien Lesna, Henri Contenet, Bor, Lartigue, Edmond Jacquelin, Thaddäus Robl, Arthur Adalbert Chase, and others. He was defeated only by Harry Elkes, in the match between the two riders on 13 May 1900 at the Parc des Princes.

He broke the paced hour record in 1898, covering 54.45 km (33.83 mi), and again in 1900, covering 59.486 km (36.963 mi). He subsequently covered 62.313 km (38.720 mi) behind a motorcycle.

In 1900, he competed at the Paris Olympic Games in professional races that were not recognized as Olympic events. He won the 100-mile race. In 1901, he went to the United States to race for six months.

After finishing third in the professional stayer event at the 1902 Track Cycling World Championships, he was forced to retire from racing because of illness and became manager of Swiss cyclist Jean Gougoltz.

In 1903, Taylor died of tuberculosis at his grandmother's home in Le Perreux. He was buried in Nogent-sur-Marne.

== Achievements ==
1896
(silver) motor-paced event at the French National Track Championships

1897
1st Prix du Conseil général

1899
(France) (gold) motor-paced event at the French National Track Championships

1900
(silver) professional motor-paced racing event at the 1900 UCI Track Cycling World Championships
(bronze) European motor-paced championship
1st 100 miles in the professional race at the 1900 Paris Olympic Games
3rd in the 100 km in the professional race at the 1900 Summer Olympics
1st Roue d'Or de Berlin

1902
(bronze) Professional motor-paced racing event at the 1902 UCI Track Cycling World Championships

== Memorial ==
A Prix Édouard Taylor, a 40 km motorcycle-paced race, was established in his memory around 1906 and was contested until at least 1932.
