= 1897 ICA Track Cycling World Championships =

- Venue: Glasgow, United Kingdom
- Date: 30 July - 2 August 1897
- Velodrome: Celtic Park
- Events: 4

The 1897 ICA Track Cycling World Championships were the World Championship for track cycling. They took place in Glasgow, United Kingdom from 30 July - 2 August 1897. Four events for men were contested, two for professionals and two for amateurs.

== Medal summary ==
Event	Gold	Silver	Bronze
Men's Professional Events
Men's sprint	Willy Arend; Germany	Charles F. Barden; Great Britain	Paul Nossam; France
Men's motor-paced	Jack William Stocks; Great Britain	Arthur Adalbert Chase; Great Britain	Fred Armstrong; Great Britain
Men's Amateur Events
Men's sprint	Edwin Schraeder; Denmark	W. P. Fawcett; Great Britain	Harry Reynolds; Ireland
Men's motor-paced	Edward Gould; Great Britain	Emile Ouzon; France	Rasmond Tjoerby; Denmark

== Medal table ==
Rank	Nation	Gold	Silver	Bronze	Total
1	Great Britain (GBR)	2	3	1	6
2	Denmark (DEN)	1	0	1	2
3	Germany (GER)	1	0	0	1
4	France (FRA)	0	1	1	2
5	Ireland (IRE)	0	0	1	1
Totals (5 entries)		4	4	4	12
