= 1896 ICA Track Cycling World Championships =

Cycling competition

- Harry Reynolds, Men's sprint winner (amateurs)
- Venue: Copenhagen, Denmark
- Date: 14–15 August 1896
- Velodrome: Ordrupbanen
- Events: 4

The 1896 ICA Track Cycling World Championships were the fourth world championships for track cycling. They took place in Copenhagen, Denmark. There were four events; separate amateur and professional races in both the sprint and the stayers' race (motor-paced).

== Medal summary ==
Event	Gold	Silver	Bronze
Men's Professional Events
Men's sprint	Paul Bourillon; France	Charles F. Barden; United Kingdom	Edmond Jacquelin; France
Men's motor-paced	Arthur Adalbert Chase; United Kingdom	Jack Williams Stocks; United Kingdom	Ferenc Gerger; Hungary
Men's Amateur Events
Men's sprint	Harry Reynolds; United Kingdom (Ireland)	Edwin Schraeder; Denmark	Charles Guillaumet; France
Men's motor-paced	Fernand Ponscarme; France	Michael Djakoff; Russia	Anton Hansen; Denmark

== Medal table ==
Rank	Nation	Gold	Silver	Bronze	Total
1	Great Britain (GBR)	2	2	0	4
2	France (FRA)	2	0	2	4
3	Denmark (DEN)	0	1	1	2
4	Russia (RUS)	0	1	0	1
5	Hungary (HUN)	0	0	1	1
Totals (5 entries)		4	4	4	12

== See also ==
- Cycling at the 1896 Summer Olympics
