= 1900 UCI Track Cycling World Championships =

- Venue: Paris, France
- Date: 12–18 August 1900
- Velodrome: Parc des Princes
- Events: 4 + 1 unofficial tandem event

The 1900 UCI Track Cycling World Championships were the World Championship for track cycling. They took place in Paris, France from 12 to 18 August 1900. Four events for men were contested, two for professionals and two for amateurs. Apart from the four events a tandem event was organized. This race has never been officially recognized. The Dutch duo Harrie Meyers-Fernando Tomaselli won ahead of the French duo Edmond Jacquelin-Lucien Louvet and the French-American duo Charles Vanoni-Robert Protin. Because the race was not official the medalists are not listed in the list of Tandem World Champions.

== Medal summary ==
Event	Gold	Silver	Bronze
Men's Professional Events
Men's sprint	Edmond Jacquelin; France	Harrie Meyers; Netherlands	Willy Arend; Germany
Men's motor-paced	Constant Huret; France	Edouard-Henri Taylor; France	Émile Bouhours; France
Men's Amateur Events
Men's sprint	Alphonse Didier-Nauts; Belgium	John Henry Lake; United States	Ferdinand Vasserot; France
Men's motor-paced	Louis Bastien; France	Wilhelm Henie; Norway	Lloyd Hildebrand; United Kingdom

== Medal table ==
Rank	Nation	Gold	Silver	Bronze	Total
1	France (FRA)	3	1	2	6
2	Belgium (BEL)	1	0	0	1
3	Netherlands (NED)	0	1	0	1
3	Norway (NOR)	0	1	0	1
3	United States (USA)	0	1	0	1
6	Germany (GER)	0	0	1	1
6	Great Britain (GBR)	0	0	1	1
Totals (7 entries)		4	4	4	12

== See also ==
- Cycling at the 1900 Summer Olympics
