= Honoré Fossier =

French cyclist (1876–1948)

- Fossier in 1920

Personal information
- Full name: Louis Honoré Fossier
- Born: 18 May 1876 Pontfaverger-Moronvilliers, France
- Died: 11 July 1948 (aged 72) Paris, France

Cycling career
- Sport: Cycling
- Discipline: Track; Road
- Role: Rider

Professional team
- 1892–1901: Individual

Louis Honoré Fossier (18 May 1876 – 11 July 1948) was a French road and track cyclist, pacemaker and motorcyclist. He competed as a cyclist between 1892 and 1901 and participated in among others the 1900 Summer Olympics and the inaugural 1903 Tour de France. As pacemaker for his son Henri Fossier, they became hour record holder for amateurs in 1913.

== Biography ==
Fossier (left) with his son Henri Fossier setting the hour record for amateurs in 1913

Prize winner of the GP of Toussaint in 1920

Fossier was born on 18 May 1876 in Pontfaverger-Moronvilliers, in the Marne department of France. His younger brother Auguste Fossier was also a cyclist. He competed as a cyclist between 1892 and 1901 and also competed in motorcycle racing.

At the 1900 Summer Olympics in Paris, Fossier competed in the professional tandem sprint event together with Paul Bourotte and in the 3000 metres handicap event. Before July 2021 the IOC has never decided which events were "Olympic" and which were not. Nowadays, these events are not recognized by the International Olympic Committee as official Olympic medal competitions, as these events were open for professionals.

Fossier was also active on the road, and participated among others in the 1903 Tour de France, the inaugural Tour de France. In this Tour he didn't finish stage 4.

His son Henri Fossier also became a cyclist. Fossier became the pacemaker of his son in motor-paced racing. In August 1913 they became hour record holder for amateurs with a distance of 71.475 km at the Vélodrome Buffalo.

He also continued cycling himself in motor-paced racing. He was paced by his brother Auguste Fossier competing in races in France. They had to stop racing at the outbreak of World War I. His brother was called up for military service on the first day of the War and died of typhus, which he contracted in the trenches. After the war he continued competing with his son, and won among other the Grand Pris of Toussaint.

Fossier died on 11 July 1948 in the 14th arrondissement of Paris, France, at the age of 72.
