= António Oliveira =

António Oliveira may refer to:

- António José Conceição Oliveira (born 1946), known as Toni, Portuguese former football forward and coach
- António Oliveira (footballer, born 1952), Portuguese former football midfielder, manager and president
- António Oliveira (footballer, born 1958), Portuguese former football defender
- António Oliveira (footballer, born 1961), known as Toni Conceição, Portuguese football coach
- António Oliveira (footballer, born 1982), Portuguese football manager and former midfielder
- Antonio Oliveira, Brazilian track cyclist during the 1890s-1900s
