= Paul Ruinart =

French cyclist and cycling manager (1876–1959)

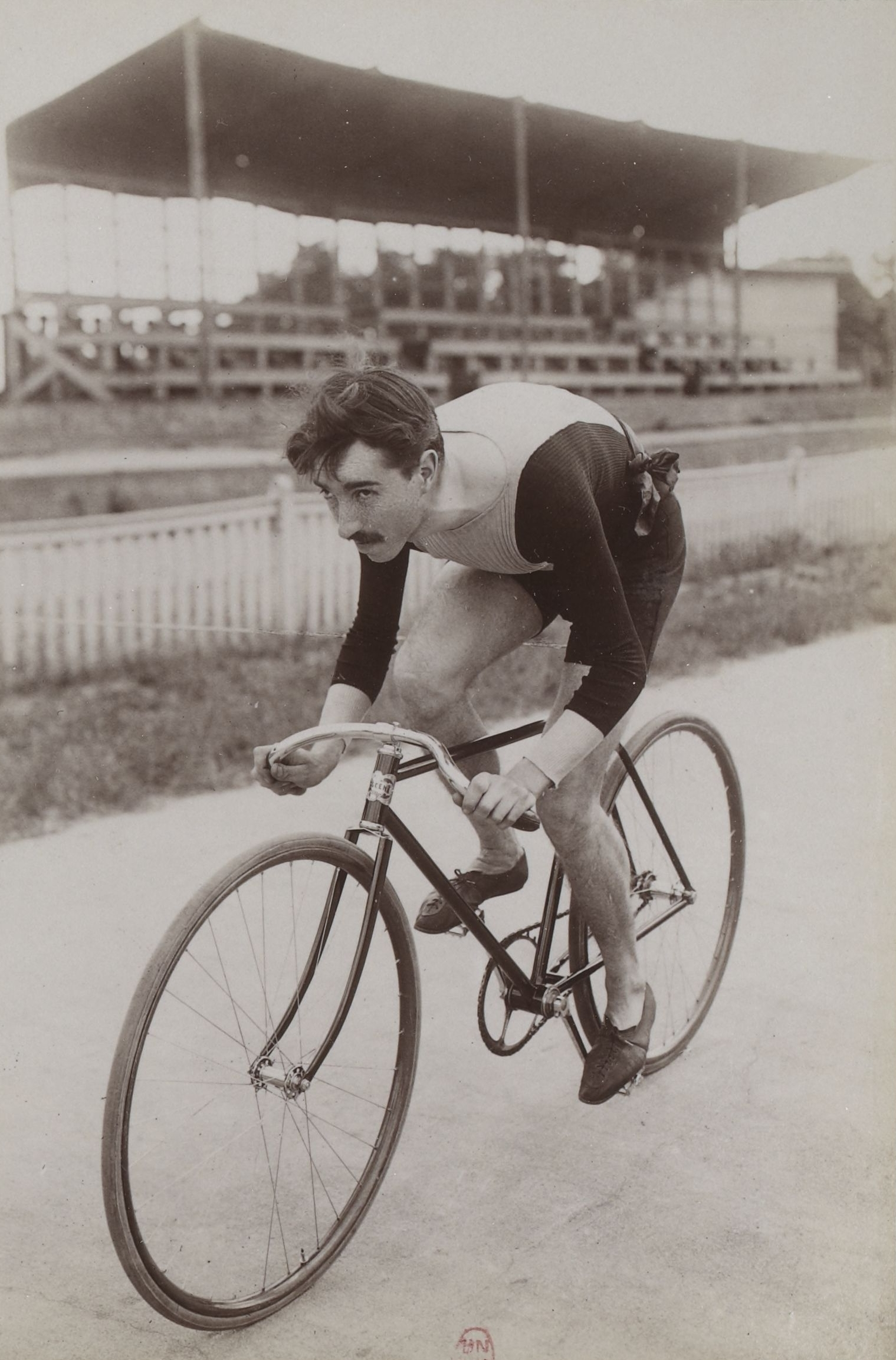
- Ruinart in 1901

Personal information
- Born: Paul Hilaire Ruinard; 28 October 1876 5th arrondissement of Paris, France
- Died: 31 May 1959 (aged 82) Boissy-Saint-Léger, France

Cycling career
- Sport: Cycling
- Discipline: Track
- Role: Rider; Manager

Amateur team
- 1895–1904: Vélo Club de Levallois

Managerial teams
- 1911–1942: Vélo Club de Levallois
- 1920–1936: France Olympic team

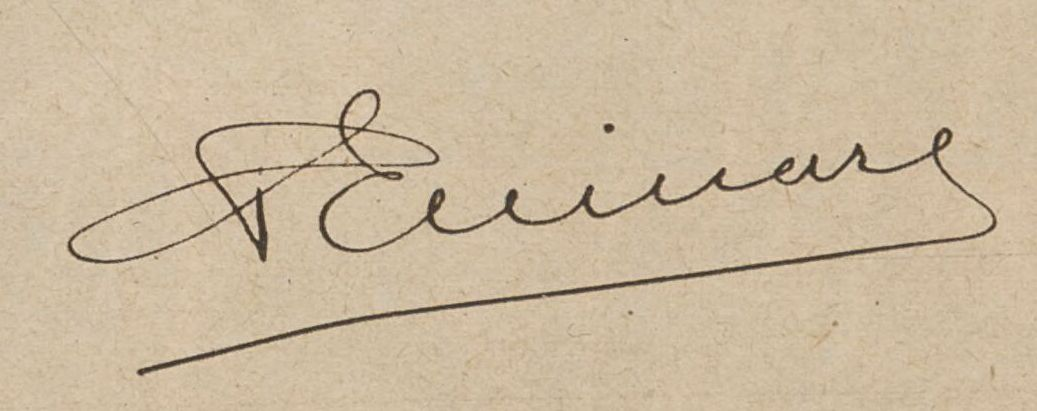
Signature of Paul Ruinart

Paul Hilaire Ruinard, known as Paul Ruinart (28 October 1876 – 31 May 1959), was a French racing cyclist, sporting director of the Vélo Club de Levallois, and manager of the French Olympic cycling team from 1920 to 1936.

== Biography ==
Paul Ruinard was the son of Jean Hilaire Ruinard, a wholesale wine merchant, and Léonie Million, who came from a modest family of Champagne origin.

From 1895 to 1904, Ruinart was a racing cyclist who specialised in track cycling, competing during the same period as Edmond Jacquelin, Paul Bourillon, Jean-Baptiste Louvet, Édouard Nieuport and Paul Masson. He finished second in the Grand Prix d'ouverture de vitesse at the Vélodrome de la Seine, behind Bourillon, in April 1897.

In 1909, he was implicated in the Marix affair, involving Captain Henri Marix, a military officer who accepted payment in exchange for military exemptions and revisions for conscripts, and Antoine-Marius Sérès, the brother of cyclist Georges Sérès. Ruinart received a Non-lieu.

In 1911, Ruinart became sporting director of the Vélo Club de Levallois. During the 1911 Tour de France, he served as an adviser to the La Française team.

In October 1912, he was sporting director of the Griffon company. In 1914, he created the Premier pas du VCL, a race organised by the Vélo Club de Levallois for beginners from the Paris region. In 1923, the organisation of the Premier pas Dunlop was entrusted to Dunlop.

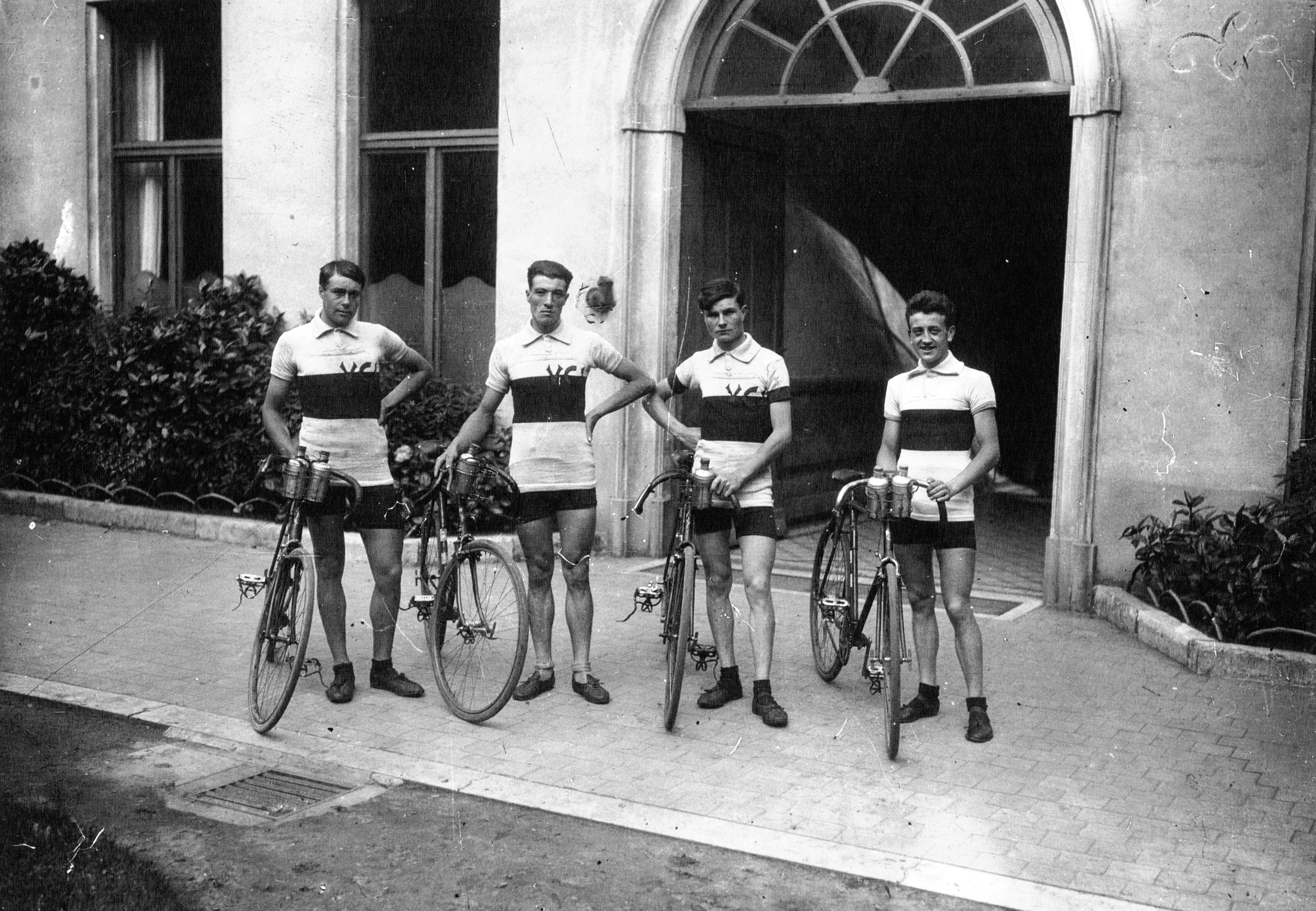
From left to right: Canteloube, Detreille, Souchard and Gobillot of France at the 1920 Summer Olympics.

At the 1920 Olympic Games in Antwerp, the first French victory was won by the team prepared by Paul Ruinart: Fernand Canteloube, Georges Detreille, Achille Souchard and Marcel Gobillot, all four members of the Vélo Club de Levallois. In 1922, he was appointed general manager by the Union Vélocipédique de France to prepare French amateur cyclists for the 1924 Summer Olympics in Paris, from which they returned with four gold medals and two bronze medals.

Ruinart created the first training camp, initially at Lyons-la-Forêt, then at Dampierre-en-Bray, and subsequently at Nanterre. In 1924, he established the camp at the presbytery of Les Loges-en-Josas (Note: Le camp des Loges.) for Olympic preparation, where it remained until 1932. Ruinart was among the first to recognise the benefits that young road cyclists could derive from healthy communal life in a rural setting, combined with the technical means to improve under the guidance of their manager.

The centre was subsequently established at the Christ de Saclay, before finally moving to La Celle-Saint-Cloud, (Note: When Marcel Cerdan moved to Paris in 1938, he stayed at the Vélo Club de Levallois training camp in La Celle-Saint-Cloud. "Official Marcel Cerdan website".) above Vaucresson, on the edge of the Bois de Saint-Cucufa, where it remained from late 1933 until 1956.

In 1925, Ruinart founded a retirement home for racing cyclists.

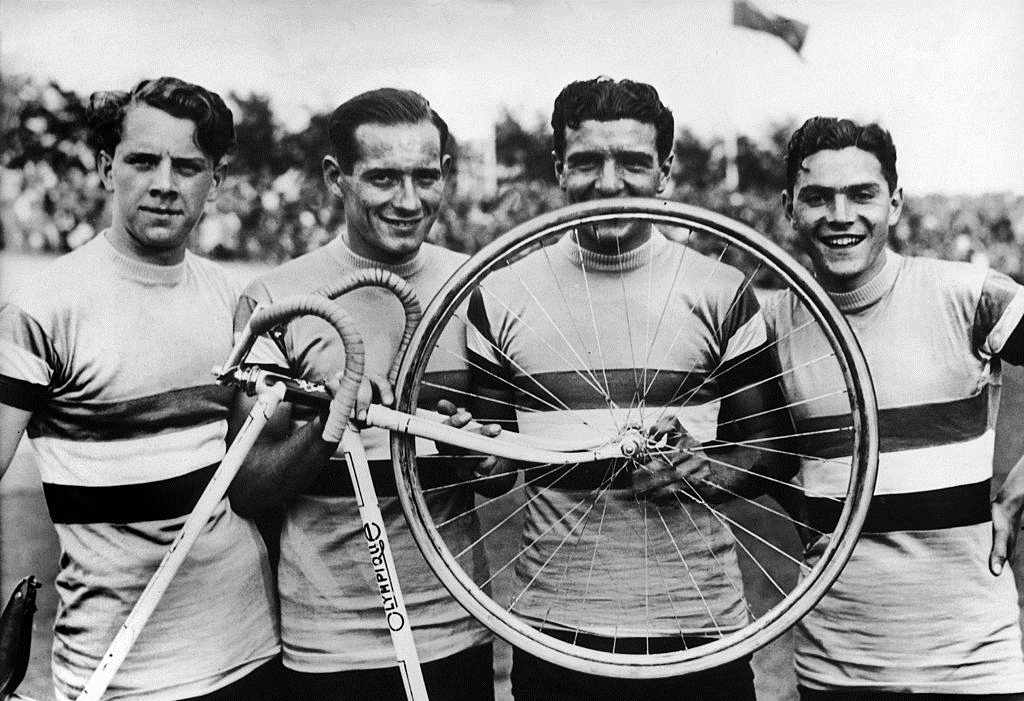
Robert Charpentier, Guy Lapébie, Jean Goujon and Roger Le Nizerhy at the 1936 Summer Olympics.

He again managed the French team at the 1928 Summer Olympics in Amsterdam, (Note: The French Olympic cycling team managed by Paul Ruinart consisted of Octave Dayen, André Aumerle, René Brossy, André Trantoul, Jules Merviel, Léon Bessières, Hubert Guyard, Roger Beaufrand and Henri Lemoine. "Les Jeux Olympiques". Gallica. Bibliothèque nationale de France. 31 July 1928.) the 1932 Summer Olympics in Los Angeles, and the 1936 Summer Olympics in Berlin. During these Games, France won three Olympic titles, including the team pursuit won by four riders from the VCL.

In 1936, he came into conflict with the Union Vélocipédique de France and openly criticised its operation. During the Occupation, Ruinart continued to train his riders, who attended the La Celle-Saint-Cloud centre to prepare for cycling races held in the Paris region and elsewhere in France.

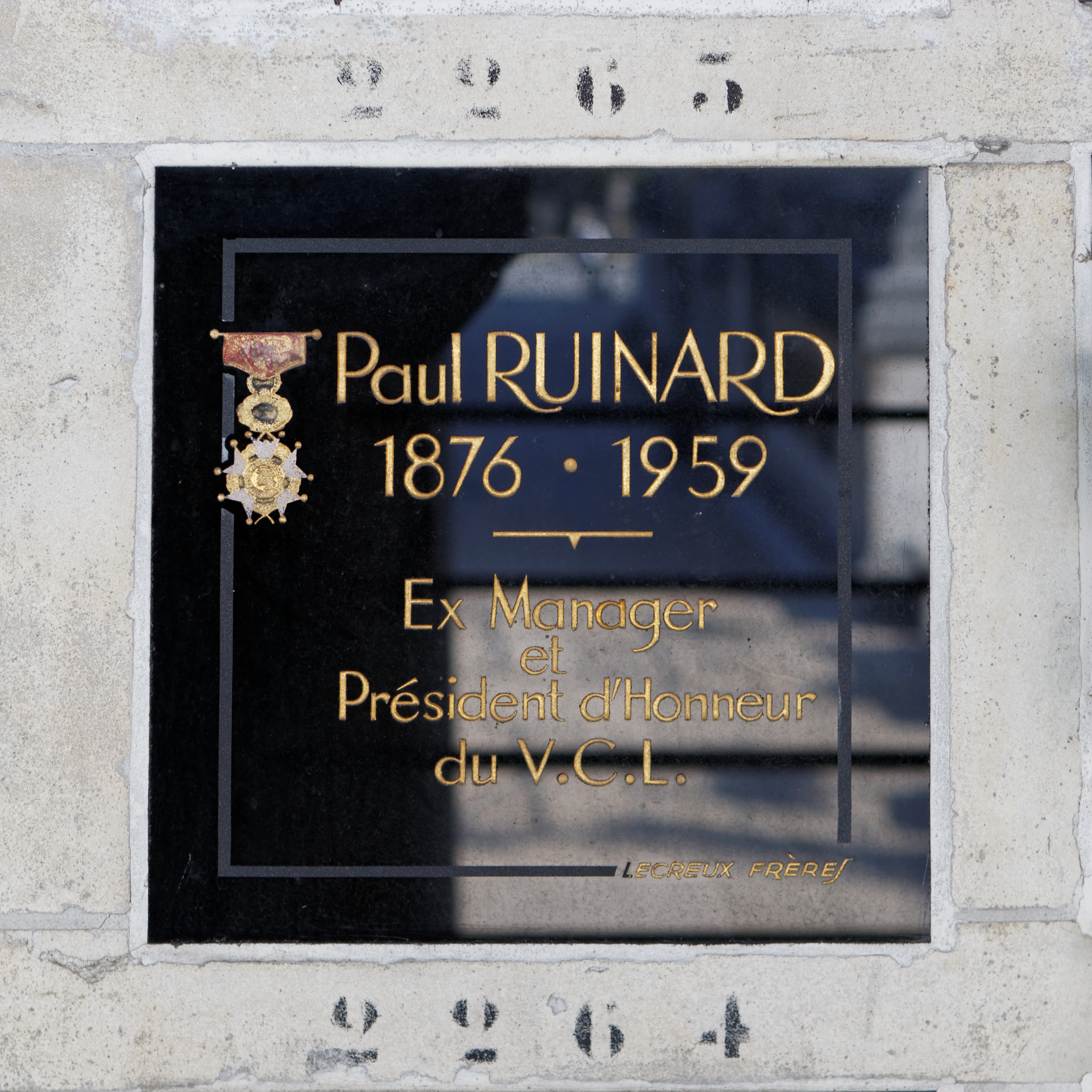
Columbarium niche at the Père-Lachaise cemetery

Following the Liberation of France, the VCL recruited new riders, whom Ruinart prepared for the 1948 Summer Olympics in London. The French Olympic cycling team won the gold medal in the 4,000-metre team pursuit with Pierre Adam, Serge Blusson, Charles Coste and Fernand Decanali.

He died on 31 May 1959 in Boissy-Saint-Léger. His ashes were initially placed in the columbarium at Père Lachaise Cemetery (Division 87, niche no. 2263) and were subsequently transferred to the Levallois-Perret Cemetery.

== Writings ==
- Ruinart, Paul (April 1926). "Comment j'ai formé des champions routiers". Très Sport (in French).

== Honours ==
- Gold Medal for Physical Education, 1932.
- Knight of the Legion of Honour, 1949.

== Bibliography ==
- Ruinart, Paul (1 December 1936). "Quarante ans de courses et de conseils". Le Miroir des sports (920).
