= Arthur Deleu =

Belgian cyclist (born 1873)

Personal information
- Nationality: Belgian
- Born: 1873 Ypres, West Flanders, Belgium

Cycling career
- Sport: Cycling
- Disciplines: Track cycling Road cycling
- Role: Rider

Professional team
- 1896-1913: Individual
Medal record
Belgian National Track Championships
Silver medal – second place	1898	Sprint
Bronze medal – third place	1900	Sprint
Bronze medal – third place	1901	Sprint
Bronze medal – third place	1909	Sprint
Bronze medal – third place	1910	Sprint

Arthur Deleu (born 1873) was a Belgian professional Track cyclist who also competed in road cycling. He competed professionally as a sprinter from 1896 to 1913.

== Biography ==
Deleu was born in Ypres in 1873. As a cyclist he specialized as a sprinter on the track. He competed professionally from 1896 to 1913. At the Belgian National Track Championships he won five medals in the sprint event between 1898 and 1910. He finished second behind Charles Van Den Born in 1898. He won the bronze medal in 1900, 1901 1909 and 1910.

He competed in professional cycling events at the 1900 Summer Olympics. He participated in the professional sprint event and tandem sprint event representing Belgium. Nowadays, these events are not recognized by the International Olympic Committee as official Olympic medal competitions, as only the amateur events are recognized as official medal event.

In April 1911 he finished fourth in an international cycling sprint in Liegeois. In August 1911 he participated in the Belgian version of the Bol d'Or cycle race together with Julien Samson in August 1911. In 1912 he competed on the track together with Pierre Everaert.

Deleu also competed in road racing. He competed among others in the 1897 Paris–Roubaix, the second edition of the Paris–Roubaix. In this 280 km long race he finished eighteenth and as second Belgian cyclist.
