= Liégeois =

Liégeois is a French word that may refer to:

- of or relating to Liège.
- Walloon language
- Café liégeois
- Jules Liégeois
- Philippe Liégeois
- a non-alcoholic mixed drink
