= 1902 UCI Track Cycling World Championships =

- Venue: Rome, Italy; Berlin, Germany
- Dates: 15 and 22 June 1902
- Velodrome: Velodromo di Porta Salaria; Radrennbahn Friedenau
- Events: 4

The 1902 UCI Track Cycling World Championships were the World Championship for track cycling. They took place in Rome, Italy for the sprint disciplines on 15 June and -as the flat cycling track in Rome proved unsuitable- in Berlin, Germany for the motor paced disciplines on 22 June. Four events for men were contested, two for professionals and two for amateurs.

== Medal summary ==
Event	Gold	Silver	Bronze
Men's Professional Events
Men's sprint	Thorvald Ellegaard; Denmark	Harie Meyers; Netherlands	Pietro Bixio; Italy
Men's motor-paced	Thaddäus Robl; Germany	Émile Bouhours; France	Edouard-Henri Taylor; France
Men's Amateur Events
Men's sprint	Charles Piard; France	Léon Delaborde; France	Orla Nord; Denmark
Men's motor-paced	Alfred Görnemann; Germany	Fritz Keller; Germany	Johan Dielhe; Germany

== Medal table ==
Rank	Nation	Gold	Silver	Bronze	Total
1	Germany (GER)	2	1	1	4
2	France (FRA)	1	2	1	4
3	Denmark (DEN)	1	0	1	2
4	Netherlands (NED)	0	1	0	1
5	Italy (ITA)	0	0	1	1
Totals (5 entries)		4	4	4	12
