= Jean-Baptiste Louvet =

- Louvet between 1896 and 1897

Personal information
- Full name: Jean Baptiste Ignace Arthur Louvet
- Born: 1 February 1879 Bertry, France
- Died: 16 April 1953 (aged 74) Saint-Laurent-sur-Mer, France

Cycling career
- Sport: Cycling
- Disciplines: Road; Track
- Role: Rider

Professional team
- 1900: Professional

Major wins
- Grand Prix de Copenhague (1898)
Medal record
Men's cycling
Representing France
Summer Olympics
Second place	1900 Paris	Team sprint (professionals)
Third place	1900 Paris	Tandem sprint (professionals)
World Championships
First place	1902 Rome	Tandem

Jean Baptiste Ignace Arthur Louvet (1 February 1879 – 16 April 1953) was a French road and track cyclist and entrepreneur and mayor.

As a professional cyclist he had podium finishes at the Summer Olymics and World Track Championships. Later the J.B. Louvet cycling team was named after him.

== Biography ==
=== Cycling career ===
Images of Louvet around 1899

Louvet competed in both road cycling and track cycling. In 1898 he won the inaugural Grand Prix de Copenhague. In 1899, he finished third in the Grand Prix de l'UVF.

He became a professional in 1900. In that year Louvet took part in the professional cycling competitions held during the 1900 Summer Olympics. He competed in five different events. He finished second in the team sprint event with Edmond Jacquelin and Paul Bourillon and third in the tandem sprint event with Edmond Jacquelin. Before July 2021 the IOC has never decided which events were "Olympic" and which were not. Nowadays, these events are not recognized by the International Olympic Committee as official Olympic medal competitions.

At the 1902 UCI Track Cycling World Championships, he won a tandem race with Edmond Jacquelin, although the event was not an official part of the championships. The same year he also finished third in the sprint event at the 1902 French national track championships.

=== Business career and later life ===
Louvet founded the bicycle manufacturer bearing his name in 1904 in Puteaux. From 1909, his company became involved in cycling as the sponsor of a cycling team named after himself J.B. Louvet. The team existed from 1909 to 1955 and competed in the Tour de France on several occasions. In 1937, the Louvet company was acquired by Dilecta, another bicycle manufacturer.

During World War II his wife was killed during the Normandy landings by shrapnel. After WW-II Louvet became mayor of Saint-Laurent-sur-Mer.
