= Richard Heller =

Austrian cyclist (born 1880)

- Heller in 1905

Personal information
- Born: 9 March 1880 Vienna, Austria

Cycling career
- Sport: Cycling
- Discipline: Track
- Role: Rider

Professional team
- 1900-1912: Individual

Richard Heller (9 March 1880 – unknown) was an Austrian track cyclist who competed as a professional cyclist from 1900 to 1912.

== Early life ==
Heller in 1905

Richard Heller was born on 9 March 1880 in Vienna, Austria.

== Career ==
Heller raced as a professional cyclist from 1900 to 1912.

At the 1900 Summer Olympics in Paris, Heller competed in four professional track cycling events. In the men's professional sprint, the professional tandem sprint with Max Lurion, he was part of the Austrian team togheter with Franz Seidl and Lurion in the professional team sprint and Heller additionally competed in the professional points race. Nowadays, the professional events are not recognized by the International Olympic Committee as official Olympic medal competitions, as only amateur events are classified as medal events. Before July 2021 the IOC has never officially decided which events were "Olympic" and which were not.

In 1902 he went to New York City, where he competed in the "Six Days of New York" cycling event.
