= Victor Thuau =

French track cyclist, aviation pioneer and aircraft designer (1880 – 1964)

- Thuau in 1909

Personal information
- Full name: Victor Paul Louis Thuau
- Born: 14 September 1880 Paris, France
- Died: 29 February 1964 (aged 83) Gouvieux, Oise, France

Cycling career
- Sport: Cycling
- Discipline: Track
- Role: Rider

Major wins
- 1903 French National Sprint Championship
Medal record
Men's cycling
Representing France
Summer Olympics
Third place	1900 Paris	Sprint #2 (professionals)
National Championships
Gold medal – first place	1903	Sprint

Victor Paul Louis Thuau (14 September 1880 – 29 February 1964) was a French track cyclist, aviation pioneer and aircraft designer.

== Biography ==
=== Personal life ===
Thuau during his military service with the Paris Fire Brigade

Thuau was born in the 14th arrondissement of Paris on 14 September 1880. As of 1903, Thuau did his compulsory military service with the Paris Fire Brigade (Sapeurs-pompiers de Paris).

He died on 29 February 1964 in Gouvieux at the age of 83 years.

=== Cycling career ===
Thuau (second from left) at the start of the scratch final at the Parc des Princes, Paris, 21 April 1907.

Thuau became a prominent track cyclist specialising in sprint events. He also competed in tandem races and rode together with among others French Algerian Léonce Ehrmann, who also became like Thuau an aviation pioneer.

He participated in the 1900 Summer Olympics in four professional cycling events. He finished third in the sprint event behind the Dutch Mathieu Cordang and the French Paul Bourotte. He also competed in the other sprint event, the 3000 metres handicap event and the tandem sprint together with Ehrmann. Nowadays, these events are not recognized by the International Olympic Committee as official Olympic medal competitions, as only the amateur events are recognized as official medal event.

He won the French national sprint championship in 1903. He also competed at the French Sprint Championships from 1905 to 1907 1905-07 and at the Grand Prix de Paris.

Thuau remained active in cycling into his later years, participating among others in the jockeys' championship at the Vélodrome d'Hiver in Paris on 9 April 1928.

=== Aircraft building ===
Monoplan Thuau in 1910

In addition to his cycling career, Thuau became involved in early aeronautical experimentation. In January 1908, the French aviation magazine L'Aérophile reported that he was building an aeroplane after obtaining satisfactory results with a scale model. The proposed full-size aircraft was expected to weigh approximately 120 kg and was to be equipped with novel propellers powered by an 8 hp, two-cylinder engine.

Thuau's eventual full-size aircraft was a monoplane based on the design of the Santos-Dumont Demoiselle. He named it the "Heroclite Phenomenon". The aircraft featured short, rectangular wings with eight ribs each, a deeply curved tailplane and a wide, squat fuselage. Its original 10 hp Anzani two-cylinder engine was later replaced by a 28 hp three-cylinder engine. Thuau also experimented with his own propeller designs, including one with adjustable pitch. The aircraft weighed approximately 120 kg and underwent unsuccessful flight tests at Issy-les-Moulineaux in July 1910.
