= Antonio Oliveira =

Brazilian cyclist

Personal information
- Born: 19th-century
- Died: 20th-century

Cycling career
- Sport: Cycling
- Discipline: Track
- Role: Rider

Major wins
- International Challenge Match (1899)

Antonio Oliveira was Brazilian track cyclist, in the earliest era of competitive cycling in Brazil. In 1899 he was dubbed as "the South American champion".

== Biography ==
Oliveira was one of the prominent figures in the early development of professional cycling in South America. In March 1899, he represented the Brazilian Wolff bicycle company in an International Challenge Match at the Palermo Velodrome in Buenos Aires, where he raced against the Italian rider Federico Momo, representing Peugeot. Oliveira arrived as the favourite after having recently won a similar challenge in São Paulo, and he confirmed that status by defeating Momo in Buenos Aires. His victory was widely celebrated, with contemporary reports describing the participation of "some of the world’s most famous cyclists" and proclaiming Oliveira as "the South American champion".

Oliveira competed at the 1900 Summer Olympics in Paris, in professional cycling events. He was the first Brazilian athlete at the Olympic Games ever, while Brazil officially debuted at the 1920 Summer Olympics. The first official Brazilian track cyclist debuted officially over half a decade later in 1956. Before July 2021 the IOC has never decided which events were "Olympic" and which were not. Nowadays, the professional events are not recognized by the International Olympic Committee as official Olympic medal competitions, as these events were open for professionals. At these 1900 Games he competed in the sprint event, tandem sprint event and 3000 metres handicap event.

In the early 20th-century South American cyclists travelled between Brazil, Argentina and Uruguay in search of competitions and prize money. Oliveira subsequently appeared alongside leading international riders in races in Buenos Aires. He won among others a pared relay race in Buenos Aires that was attended by 2500 spectators, where he raced together with a cyclist nicknamed "The Midget".
