= Rhèges =

Commune in Grand Est, France

- Commune
- Location of Rhèges
- Location within France Location within Grand Est
- Coordinates: 48°32′54″N 3°59′52″E
- Country: France
- Region: Grand Est
- Department: Aube
- Arrondissement: Nogent-sur-Seine
- Canton: Creney-près-Troyes

Government
  - Mayor (2020–2026): Jean-Louis Oudin
- Area^{1}: 14.80 km^{2} (5.71 sq mi)
- Elevation: 87 m (285 ft)
- Highest elevation: 119 m (390 ft)
- Lowest elevation: 79 m (259 ft)
- Population (2023): 206
  - Density: 13.9/km^{2} (36.0/sq mi)
- Time zone: UTC+01:00 (CET)
  - Summer (DST): UTC+02:00 (CEST)
- INSEE/Postal code: 10316 /10170
- ^{1} French Land Register data, which excludes lakes, ponds, glaciers > 1 km^{2} (0.386 sq mi or 247 acres) and river estuaries.

Rhèges (French pronunciation: [ʁɛʒ]) is a commune in the Aube department in north-central France.

== Population ==
Historical population
Year	Pop.	±% p.a.
1968	251	—
1975	232	−1.12%
1982	235	+0.18%
1990	205	−1.69%
1999	192	−0.73%
2007	217	+1.54%
2012	235	+1.61%
2017	232	−0.26%
2023	206	−1.96%
Source: INSEE

== See also ==
- Communes of the Aube department
