= José Soler =

José Soler may refer to:

- José Antonio Martínez Soler (born 1947), Spanish journalist
- José Ignacio Soler (born 1967), Spanish retired footballer
- José Maria Soler (mountaineer) (1893–1971), Spanish agronomist and mountaineer
- José María Soler García (1905–1996), Spanish archaeologist, historian, researcher, and folklorist
- José María Soler (1929–2009), better known as Víctor Israel, Spanish film actor

== See also ==
- José Maria Soler, several people
