= Harry Reynolds (cyclist) =

Irish cyclist

- Reynolds on a bicycle

Personal information
- Full name: Harry Reynolds
- Nickname: Balbriggan Flyer
- Born: 14 December 1874 Balbriggan
- Died: 16 July 1940 (aged 65)

Cycling career
- Sport: Cycling
- Discipline: Track
- Role: Rider

Harry Reynolds (born Balbriggan, Ireland, 14 December 1874, died 16 July 1940), known as the Balbriggan Flyer, was the first Irishman to win the world championship in cycling. He accomplished this at the 1896 ICA Track Cycling World Championships in Copenhagen.

In 2005 Harry Reynolds Road in his hometown of Balbriggan was named after him.
