= Liégeois (cocktail) =

A Liégeois is a non-alcoholic mixed drink made with two parts: orange soft drink and a splash of grenadine. This mix drink is best known in the province of Liège in Belgium.
