= Guus Schilling =

Dutch cyclist

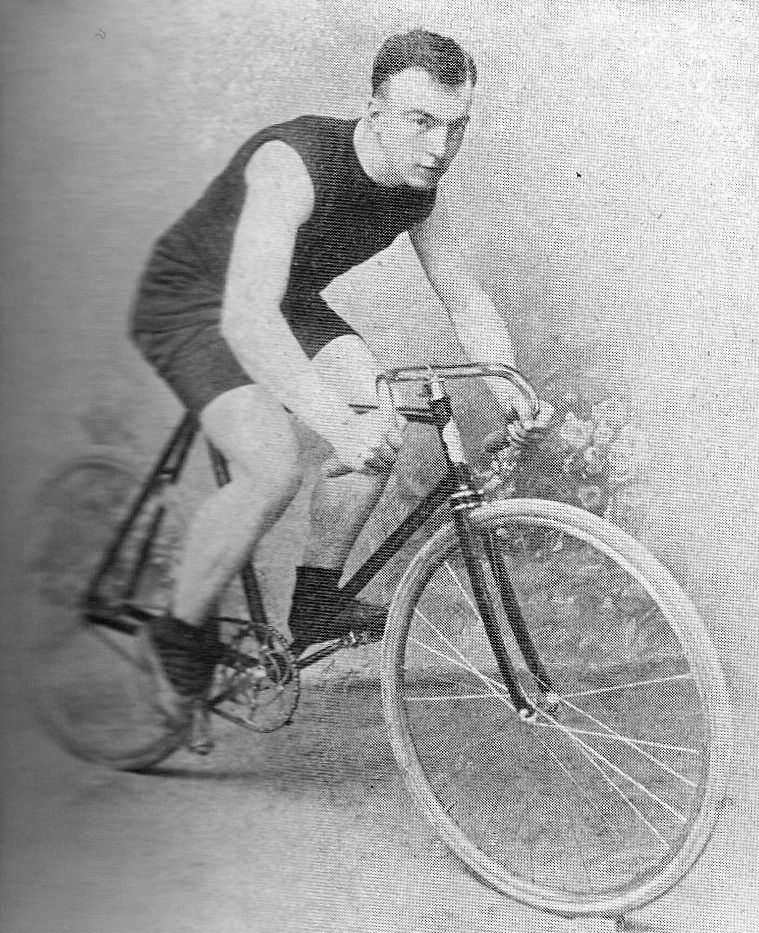

Personal information
- Full name: Gustav Schilling
- Born: 8 February 1876 Amsterdam
- Died: 16 January 1951 (aged 74) Amsterdam

Cycling career
- Sport: Cycling
- Discipline: Track cycling
- Role: Rider
- Rider type: omnium

Gustav "Guus" Schilling (born 8 February 1876 in Amsterdam – 16 January 1951 in Amsterdam) was a Dutch male track cyclist. He was a professional cyclist between 1898 and 1916. He won the bronze medal in the sprint event at the 1901 UCI Track Cycling World Championships in Berlin, Germany.
