= Charles Jue =

French cyclist (1872–1951)

- Jue in 1901

Personal information
- Full name: Charles Émile Jue
- Nickname: Le Crack de Falaise
- Born: 8 June 1872 Falaise, France
- Died: 3 March 1951 (aged 78) Clichy, France

Cycling career
- Sport: Cycling
- Discipline: Track
- Role: Rider

Major wins
- French national sprint champion (1901)
Medal record
Men's cycling
Representing France
Summer Olympics
Third place	1900 Paris	3,000 metres handicap (professionals)

Charles Émile Jue (8 June 1872 – 3 March 1951) was a French professional track cyclist, who was active during the 1900s.

== Biography ==
Jue during a tandem race (June 1904)

Jue was born in Falaise in 1872. As cyclist he was nicknamed Le Crack de Falaise. He was a professional cyclist and member of Vélo Club de Senlis.

In 1900, Jue took part in the professional cycling competitions held during the 1900 Summer Olympics. He finished third in the 3,000 metres with handicap event behind winner Pierre Chevalier. He also competed in the sprint event, points race event and national team sprint event. Before July 2021 the IOC has never decided which events were "Olympic" and which were not. Nowadays, these events are not recognized by the International Olympic Committee as official Olympic medal competitions.

In 1901 he became French national sprint champion. The same year he was runner-up in the French national stayer championship.

Jue died in Clichy on 3 March 1951 at the age of 78.

== Achievements ==
1900
3rd 1900 Summer Olympics: 3,000 metres handicap
1901
(France) (gold) French national sprint champion
(silver) French national stayer championship
