= Paul Bourotte =

French track cyclist (1876–1935)

- Bourotte in 1898

Personal information
- Nickname: the Frog
- Born: 4 January 1876 Rhèges, France
- Died: 5 August 1935 (aged 59) Gagny, France

Cycling career
- Sport: Cycling
- Discipline: Track
- Role: Rider

Professional team
- 1897–1904: Individual

Major wins
- French Stayer Championship (1901); Grand Prix de l'UVF (1902); Grand Prix de Buffalo (1902)
Medal record
Men's track cycling
Representing France
Summer Olympics
Second place	1900 Paris	Sprint #2 (professionals)
Third place	1900 Paris	Points race (professionals)

Paul Bourotte (4 January 1876 – 5 August 1935) was a French track cyclist and Directeur sportif. He became French national motor-paced champion in 1901 and won the Grand Prix de l'UVF in 1902.

== Biography ==
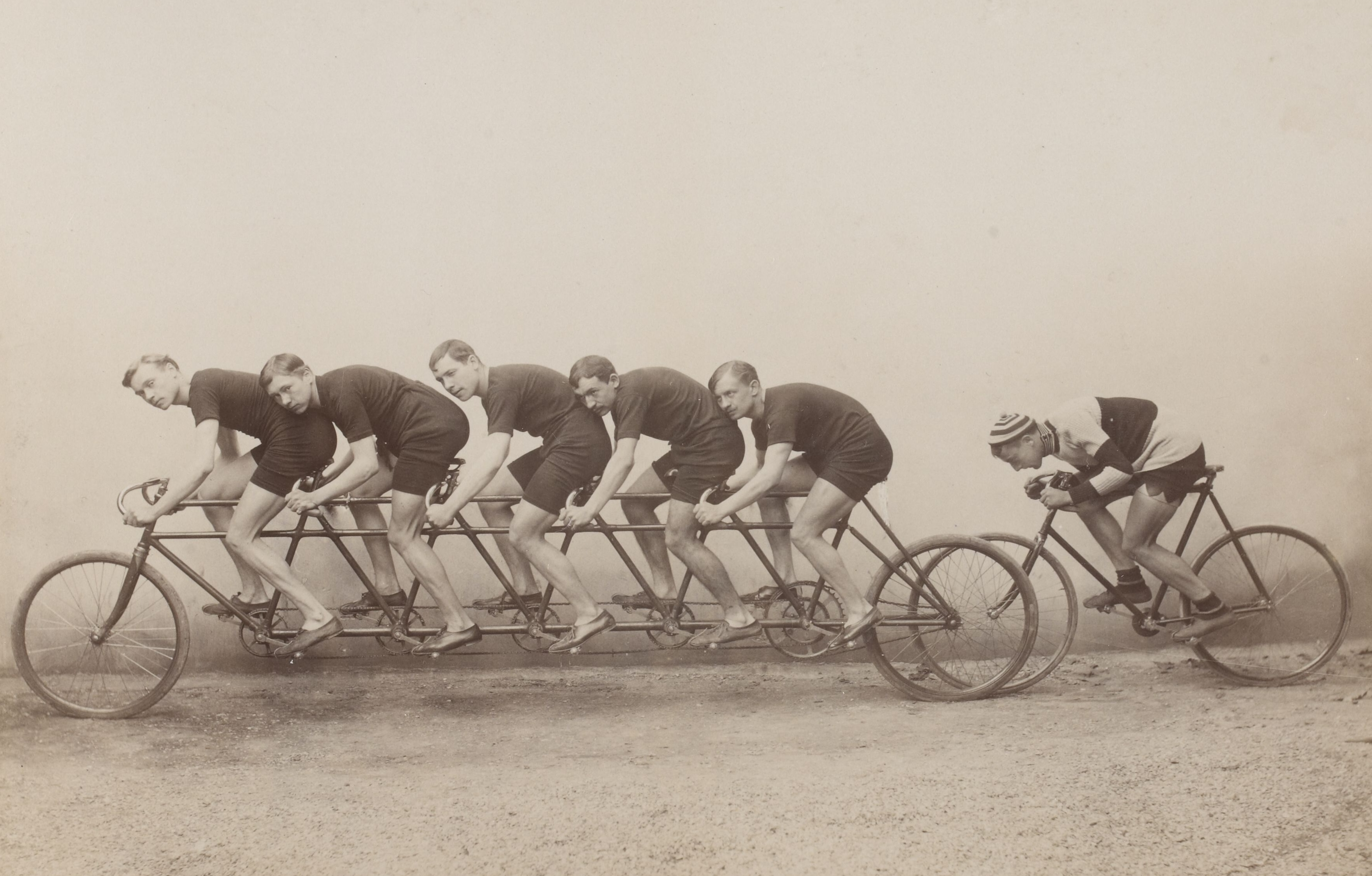
Bourotte behind a quintuplet as a pacemaker in 1897

Bourotte was born on 4 January 1876 in Rhèges, in the Aube department of France. He started cycling following an accident in which he was seriously injured after falling from his father's horse-drawn vehicle. After recovering in a Paris hospital, he remained in Paris and found employment. He spent 15 francs of his earnings on an old bicycle which had previously been used in the Paris–Brest–Paris long-distance race. He trained on the bicycle and subsequently began competing in races. His rounded posture on the bicycle earned him the nickname "the Frog".

Bourotte became a professional cyclist in 1897. In his first season as a professional, he finished second in the French national stayer championship. He also won the championship for newspaper deliverers that year.

At the 1900 Summer Olympics in Paris, Bourotte competed in the professional cycling events held during the Games. He finished second in the 3,000 metres and third in the points race, behind Floyd MacFarland and Mathieu Cordang. Before July 2021 the IOC has never decided which events were "Olympic" and which were not. Nowadays, these events are not recognized by the International Olympic Committee as official Olympic medal competitions, as these events were open for professionals. He also participated at the 1900 Track Cycling World Championships.

He won the French Stayer Championship title in 1901. In 1902, Bourotte won the Grand Prix de l'UVF, a major French professional sprint competition, as well as the Grand Prix de Buffalo. Bourotte was associated with the Union athlétique du Premier Arrondissement as an amateur cyclist in 1893. He continued to participate in cycling events after ending his professional career, including winning Paris–Conches in 1910.

After retiring from active competition, Bourotte became a sporting director of the Alcyon cycling team. During the First World War, he was mobilised into the French military. At the time, he lived in Paris. Bourotte died on 5 August 1935 in Gagny, France, at the age of 59.

== Palmarès ==
1897
2nd in the French national stayer championship
1st Newspaper Deliverers' Championship
1900
1900 Summer Olympics (professional races)

2nd 3,000 metres
3rd points race

1st Newspaper Deliverers' Championship
1901
French national stayer champion
1902
Grand Prix de l'UVF
Grand Prix de Buffalo
1910
Paris–Conches
