= Pietro Bixio =

Italian cyclist

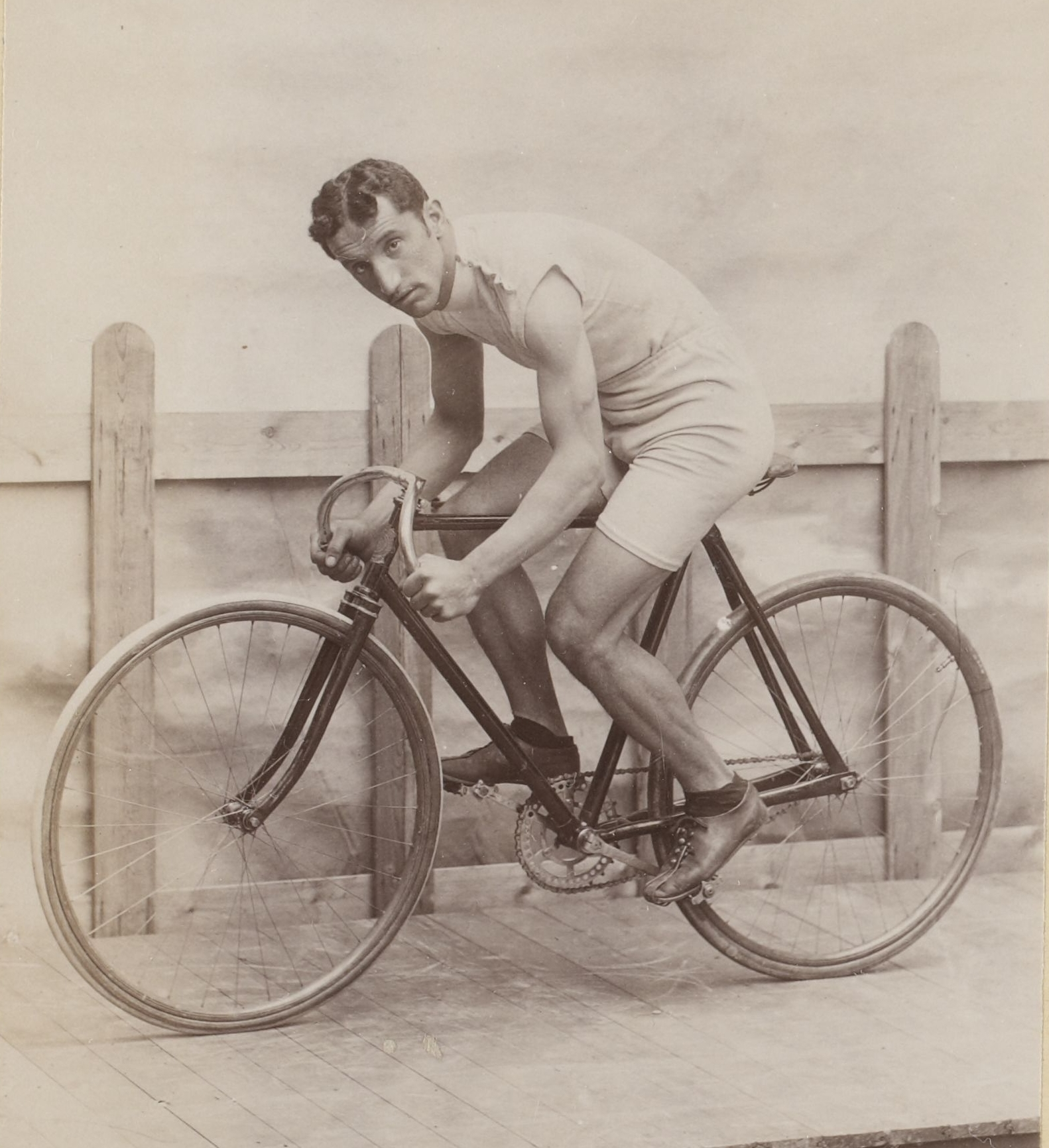

Personal information
- Full name: Pietro Bixio
- Born: 11 August 1875 Genoa, Italy
- Died: 26 July 1905 (aged 29) Mignanego, Italy

Cycling career
- Sport: Cycling
- Discipline: Sprint
- Role: Rider
Medal record
Representing Italy
World Track Championships
Bronze medal – third place	1902 Rome	Sprint
Italian National Championships
Gold medal – first place	1895	Sprint
Gold medal – first place	1903	Sprint
Gold medal – first place	1904	Sprint

Pietro Bixio (11 August 1875 – 26 July 1905) was an Italian track cyclist.

Pietro Bixio won the Italian professional sprint championship three times, in 1895, 1903 and 1904. In 1900 he raced during the Olympic Games in Paris at the Grand Prix de l’Exposition, a race for professionals for 15.000 French Francs, the biggest prize purse in the world at the time. Bixio was eliminated in the semi-final. In the Grande Course de Nations team competition over 1500 meters (a kind of points race) he was third (teaming up with Gian Ferdinando Tomaselli and Giuseppe Singrossi).

At the 1902 UCI Track Cycling World Championships in Rome, Bixio won the bronze medal in the sprint tournament, becoming the first Italian to win a medal at the World Championships. In 1903 he was also third in the prestigious Grand Prix de Paris. Other wins include the Gran Premio d'Italia in 1895, the Gran Premio della U.V.I. in 1899 and the Groote Prijs van Antwerpen in 1903.

Bixio died in 1905, aged 29, from tuberculosis.

== Literature ==
- Volker Kluge: Olympische Sommerspiele. Die Chronik I. Athen 1896 – Berlin 1936. Sportverlag Berlin, Berlin 1997, ISBN 3-328-00715-6, p. 72.
