= Giuseppe Singrossi =

Italian cyclist (1879–unknown)

- Singrossi around 1899

Personal information
- Nickname: Pinella
- Born: 29 May 1879 Milan, Italy

Cycling career
- Sport: Cycling
- Discipline: Track
- Role: Rider

Major wins
- Italian professional sprint champion (1900)
Medal record
Men's cycling
Representing Italy
Summer Olympics
Third place	1900 Paris	Team sprint (professionals)

Giuseppe Singrossi (born 29 May 1879) was an Italian professional track cyclist who was active from 1897 to 1909. He was nicknamed Pinella and won the Italian professional sprint championship in 1900 and finished third in the professional team sprint event at the 1900 Summer Olympics.

== Biography ==
Singrossi on a tandem with Minozzi in 1898

Singrossi was born in Milan on 29 May 1879. He competed as a professional cyclist and was active professionally from 1897 to 1909. He competed once in the Grand Prix de Paris, in 1897. In 1900 he became Italian national champion in the sprint event.

In 1900, Singrossi competed in several professional cycling events during the 1900 Summer Olympics in Paris. He competed in the professional sprint, tandem sprint, team sprint and 3,000 metres handicap events. These events are nowadays classified as non-medal events rather than official Olympic medal competitions. In the team points race event, also known as the Grande Course des Nations, held over 1,500 metres, he finished with the Italian team third together with Pietro Bixio and Gian Ferdinando Tomaselli. In the tandem sprint, Singrossi competed with Pietro Bixio and were eliminated in the semi-final. In the 3,000 metres handicap, he won his first-round heat but did not advance to the final. Before July 2021 the IOC has never decided which events were "Olympic" and which were not. Nowadays, these events are not recognized by the International Olympic Committee as official Olympic medal competitions.

During the 1900s Singrossi had two podium finished at the Italian Track Cchampionships. He won the bronze medal in the motor-paced event in 1905 and also won the bronze medal in the sprint event in 1908.

== Achievements ==
1900
(Italy) (gold) Italian national professional sprint championships
3rd 1900 Summer Olympics: professional team sprint, Italy
1905
(bronze) Italian Track Championship: motor-paced
1908
(bronze) Italian Track Championship: sprint
