= Karl Käser (cyclist) =

German cyclist (1874–1904)

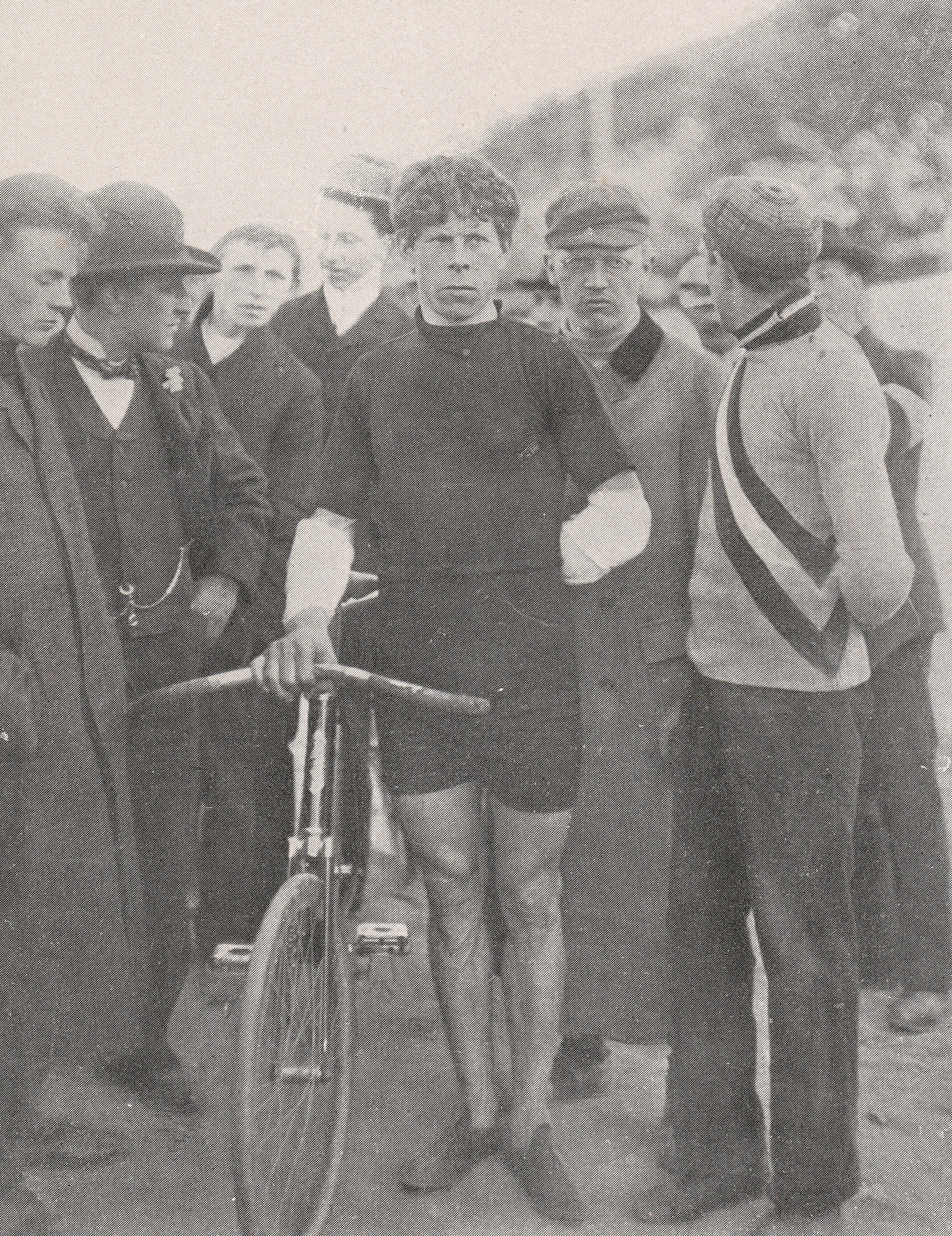
- Käser in 1903

Personal information
- Born: 22 April 1874 Wehr, Baden-Württemberg, Germany
- Died: 16 August 1904 (aged 30) Plauen, Germany

Sport
- Sport: Track cycling
Medal record
European Track Cycling Championships
Silver medal – second place	1900 Köln	10 km
Bronze medal – third place	1897 Köln	10 km

Karl Käser also spelled as Carl Kaeser (Note: Some sources spell Käser's name as "Carl Kaeser" – see "Trove"/The Sydney Mail reference.) (22 April 1874 – 16 August 1904) was a German track cyclist who competed between 1896 and 1904 in all track cycling disciplines.

Käser participated mainly in track cycling races in Germany but also competed internationally, including in the United States in the 1900 six-day race of New York. He competed for Germany in the professional/non-medal classification at the 1900 Summer Olympics in three separate events - the sprint, the tandem sprint, and the 3,000 metres. Käser was also the pacemaker of the Swiss cyclist Edmond Audemars, World Champion at the 1903 UCI Track Cycling World Championships.

Käser died as a result of a fall during a paced race between himself and Thaddeus Robl at the Plauen track in Saxony, Germany in August 1904. He was utilizing a 24-inch tire on a 22-inch wheel and in the moments before his fatal accident he had just pushed back his safety helmet. (Note: The reference Sport-Album der Rad-Welt seen here was an annual compendium of the sports-newspaper Rad-Welt or "Bike World". Rad-Welt started publication in 1895 and ceased publication in 1933. It was published six days a week during the summer season and twice a week from October until March. The annual Sport-Album contained photographs that the daily newspaper could not because of publication time-constraints. The Sport-Album published a column, "Die Toten der Rennbahn" (or "The Dead of the Racetrack") that consisted of obituaries for dead cyclists.)

== See also ==
- List of racing cyclists and pacemakers with a cycling-related death
