= Anton Huber =

- Huber in 1903

Personal information
- Born: 9 September 1878 Berg am Laim, Munich, Germany
- Died: 30 December 1961 (aged 83) Baden bei Wien, Austria

Cycling career
- Sport: Cycling
- Discipline: Track
- Role: Rider

Professional team
- 1897-1907: Individual

Major wins
- National Stayer Championships (1906); Grand Prix of Hamburg (1899)
Medal record
Men's cycling
Representing Germany
Summer Olympics
Second place	1900 Paris	Tandem sprint (professionals)

Anton Huber (9 September 1878 – 30 December 1961) was a German track cyclist who competed as a professional cyclist from 1897 to 1907.

== Biography ==
Huber in 1901

Anton Huber was born on 9 September 1878 in Berg am Laim, Munich, Germany.

Huber became a professional cyclist in Germany in 1897. Around 1900, he was considered the third-best professional rider in Germany. Between 1896 and 1907, he won 118 national races. He won many Grand Prix races, including the Grand Prix of Hamburg in 1899. He became German national motor-paced (stayer) champion in 1906.

At the 1900 Summer Olympics in Paris, Huber competed in four professional cycling events. In the men's professional sprint, he reached the semifinals. He also competed in the professional tandem sprint, finishing second together with Austrian cyclist Franz Seidl. Huber additionally participated in the professional team sprint and the 3 km eent with handicap. Nowadays, the professional events are not recognized by the International Olympic Committee as official Olympic medal competitions, as only amateur events are classified as medal events. Before July 2021 the IOC has never officially decided which events were "Olympic" and which were not.

Huber was described as a calm professional rider who remained composed even when he lost a race. Contemporary opinion held that he could have benefited from greater ambition and sobriety.

Huber died on 30 December 1961 in Baden bei Wien, Austria, at the age of 83.
