= Gian Ferdinando Tomaselli =

Italian cyclist (1876–1944)

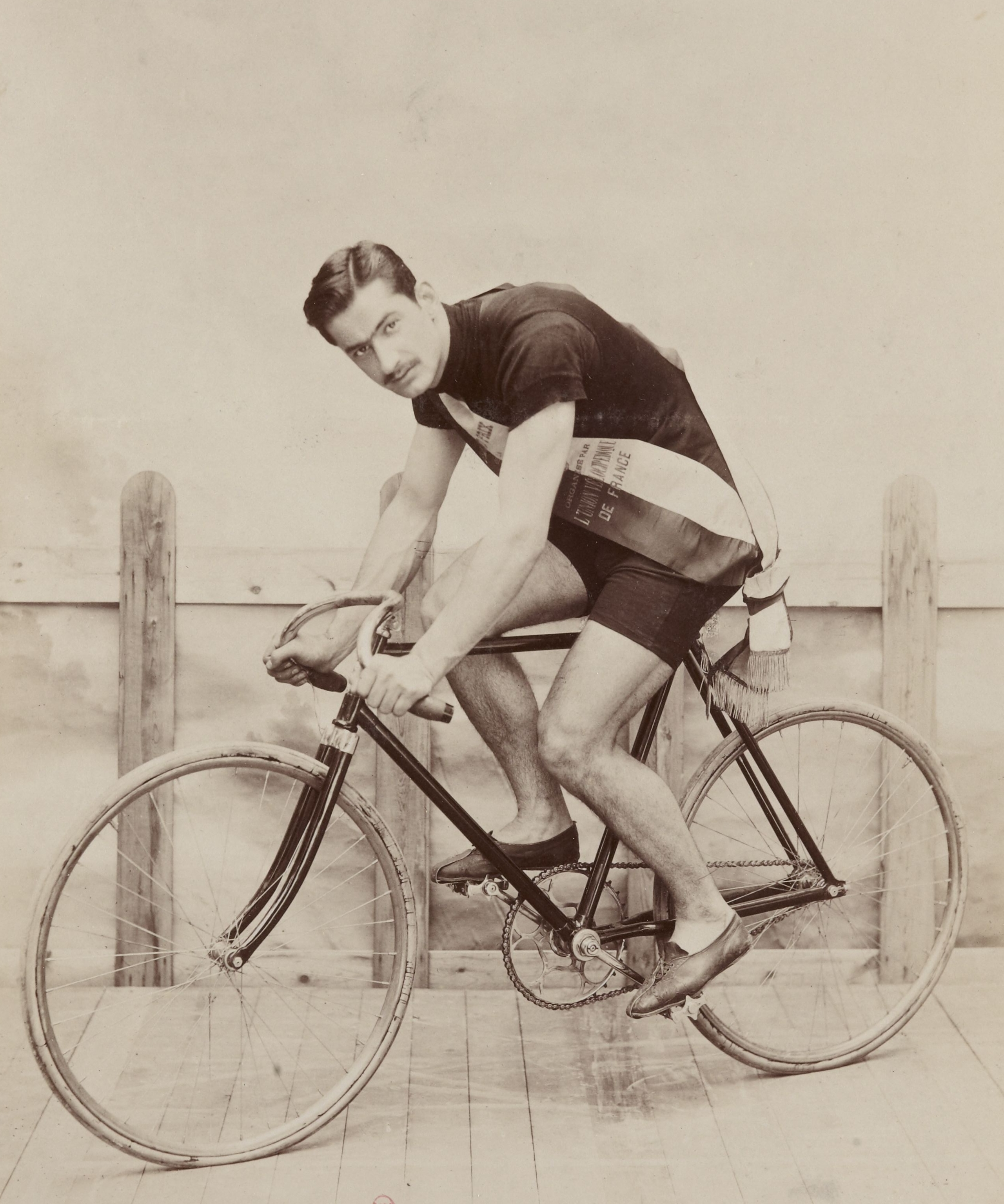
- Tomaselli in 1899

Personal information
- Full name: Giovanni Battista Luigi Tommaselli
- Born: 29 April 1876 Salò, Italy
- Died: 15 July 1944 (aged 68) Selvino, Italy

Cycling career
- Sport: Cycling
- Discipline: Track
- Role: Rider
- Rider type: Sprinter

Professional team
- 1897–1900: Individual

Major wins
- Italian sprint champion (1897, 1899); Grand Prix de l'UVF (1899); Grand Prix de Paris (1899); World tandem champion (1900, unofficial)
Medal record
Men's track cycling
Representing Italy
Summer Olympics
Winner	1900 Paris	Tandem sprint (professionals)
Third place	1900 Paris	Team sprint (professionals)

Giovanni Battista Luigi "Gian Ferdinando" Tomaselli or Tommaselli, also known as Giovanni Tomaselli (29 April 1876 – 15 July 1944), was an Italian track cyclist, motorcycle racer, racing driver and designer.

== Biography ==
Tomaselli was an Italian leading professional track sprinters during the late 1890s. He won the Italian national sprint championship in 1897 and again in 1899. In the latter year he also won both the Grand Prix de l'UVF and the Grand Prix de Paris. The next year, he finished third in the 1900 Grand Prix de Paris.

In 1900, Tomaselli took part in the professional cycling competitions held during the Paris Olympic Games. He won the tandem sprint event together with the Dutch cyclist Harrie Meyers. In the team points race, also known as the Grande Course des Nations, held over 1,500 metres, he finished with the Italian team third together with Pietro Bixio and Giuseppe Singrossi. He also participated in the 3,000 metres event with handicap for professionals. Before July 2021 the IOC has never decided which events were "Olympic" and which were not. Nowadays, these events are not recognized by the International Olympic Committee as official Olympic medal competitions.

At the 1900 World Track Championships in Paris, Tomaselli and Dutch rider Harrie Meyers won the tandem race held alongside the four championship events. The tandem race was not officially recognized as a world championship event.

During the 1900s, Tomaselli broadened his involvement in motor sport, competing in motorcycle and automobile events for Bianchi. In 1904, he took part in the Milan–Nice motorcycle race, while in 1907 he competed in the Kaiserpreis automobile race driving a Bianchi 120 CV.

Tomaselli later became involved in the development of racing motorcycles at Bianchi. During the 1920s, he contributed to the design of a 350 cc racing motorcycle with which Tazio Nuvolari won the 350 cc class of the European championship in 1925.

== Achievements ==
1896
1st Grand Prix of Turin

1897
(gold) Italian sprint champion

1899
(gold) Italian sprint champion
1st Grand Prix de l'UVF
1st Grand Prix de Paris
1st Grand Prix of Turin

1900
1st Track Cycling World Championships, tandem race (unofficial), with Harrie Meyers
1st 1900 Summer Olymics, 2,000 metres tandem sprint (unofficial), with Harrie Meyers
1st Grand Prix of Turin
3rd 1900 Summer Olymics, team sprint (unofficial), with Pietro Bixio and Giuseppe Singrossi
