= Tom Cooper (cyclist) =

American cyclist (1872–1906)

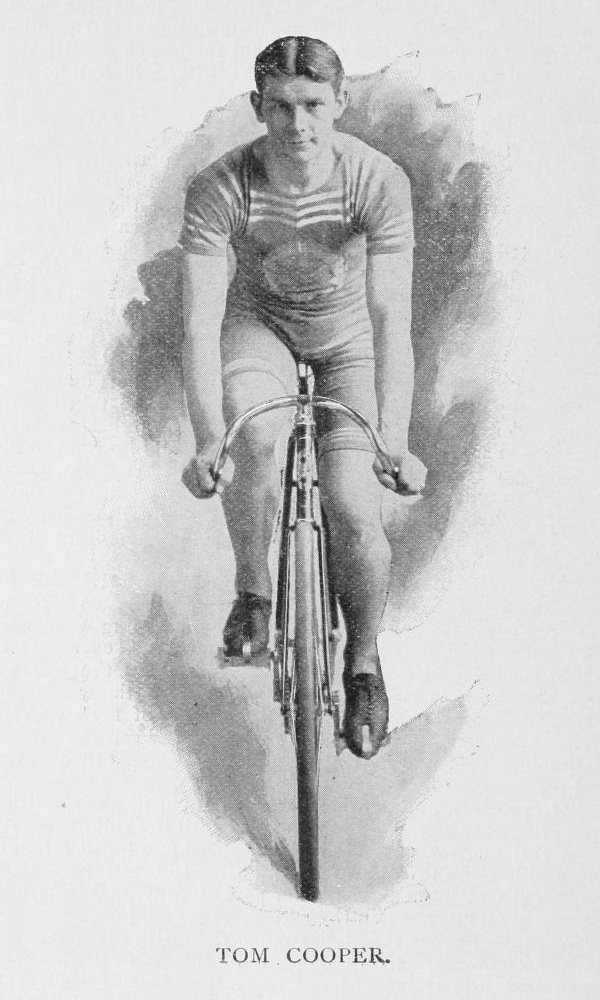
- Tom Cooper

Personal information
- Born: Thomas Cooper; December 1, 1872 Detroit, Michigan, U.S.
- Died: November 20, 1906 (aged 31) New York City, New York, U.S.

Cycling career
- Sport: Cycling

Tom Cooper circa 1897

Tom Cooper (December 1, 1872 – November 20, 1906) was an American cyclist and early automobile racing driver. He is best known for his rivalry with cyclist Major Taylor, as well as his later work with Henry Ford and Barney Oldfield.

== Early years ==
Tom Cooper began his cycling career in Detroit, Michigan. His talent and athletic ability soon made him a national celebrity in the US as he climbed to the top of the sport. As a champion bicycle racer, Cooper was a contemporary of Barney Oldfield, Carl G. Fisher, Johnny Johnson, Arthur Gardiner, "Plugger Bill" Martin and Eddie Bald.

At the 1898 League of American Wheelmen championship race on the Newby Oval in Indianapolis, Cooper won the half-mile professional event. He went on to win the Bicycle Championship of America for the 1899 season. Cooper was instrumental in the formation of the American Racing Cyclists Union in 1898, a rival to the League of American Wheelmen.

Cooper, like many bicycle racers at the time such as Fisher and Oldfield, was drawn to the nascent automobile industry in the early 1900s. The gears and chains of bicycles were the heart of the powertrains of the earliest automobiles.

== The Cooper-Ford racer ==
In 1902, Cooper formed a partnership with fellow Detroiter Henry Ford to build two high-speed race cars. This was about a year before Ford founded the Ford Motor Company. The result of the project were two wood-frame racers with four cylinder, 1,080 cubic inch engines. The cars were initially temperamental and Ford sold his share of their partnership to Cooper in October 1902. This was just days before Cooper entered them in the Manufacturer's Challenge Cup at Grosse Pointe, Michigan on October 25, 1902. Cooper, assisted by mechanic Ed "Spider" Huff, agreed that Barney Oldfield should drive the machine they had focused on, "999" (named after a New York Central railroad train). The result of the event became the topic of national news when Oldfield defeated millionaire Alexander Winton, founder of the Winton Motor Carriage Company, and widely recognized as America's top race driver.

Oldfield continued to race for Cooper for another 10 months, doing much to establish Ford's reputation as an automotive engineer by winning several races. He also drove the Cooper-Ford "999" racer to the first "mile a minute" (60 mph) on a circular track at the Indiana State Fairgrounds dirt oval in June 1903.

== Cooper-Oldfield barnstorming ==
Cooper and Oldfield remained partners in many ways even after Oldfield left their race team to drive for Alexander Winton in August 1903. The two toured the Midwestern United States negotiating $1,000-plus purses from organizations such as the State Fair Association of Milwaukee in 1903. One of the highlights of these events for Cooper was his victory over Oldfield and one of his Winton racers at Grosse Pointe, Michigan on September 9, 1903.

Cooper was a recognized top driver in his own right, and barnstormed on occasion without Oldfield. Some of these events were odd exhibitions, such as his special mile record on September 5, 1906, when he drove a Matheson automobile with seven passengers to a record for the distance under those conditions at 50.2 seconds or 71.71 mph. This record was achieved on the beach at Atlantic City.

== Vanderbilt Cup career ==
Although Cooper never raced in the Vanderbilt Cup, he did work with the American Matheson team in 1905 and 1906, and was entered in the 1905 American Elimination Trials on September 22, 1905. In the final day of practice for the 1905 American Elimination Trial, Cooper's Matheson had a faulty lubricating system, destroying the main engine bearing. In 1906, Cooper returned with Matheson not as a driver, but as team manager. The driver was the Italian Ralph Mongini. Mongini led a few miles of the first lap around the 29.71 mile course before losing control of his machine and crashing into a telegraph pole. The 1906 race was held September 23.

== Vanderbilt Cup Broadway play ==
Cooper and Oldfield took several creative approaches to making money. Bicycle racers, mechanics, race car drivers, they even owned a gold mine together in Colorado at the turn of the 20th century. In January 1906, they attempted to parlay their renown as race drivers into an easier way to generate large sums of money. Together they created a special effect using two race cars (the Peerless Green Dragon and the Peerless Blue Streak), bags of dirt, two large treadmills and stage props to create the illusion of a motor race for a Charles Dillingham play, The Vanderbilt Cup, starring Elsie Janis. The two appeared on stage nightly. The show was a success but Oldfield and Cooper tired of the acting lifestyle in less than three months and returned to auto racing full-time.

== Death ==
Cooper was killed in an auto accident while racing in Central Park in New York City on November 16, 1906. He is buried in Woodmere Cemetery in Detroit.

== Sources ==
- The New York Times, "Cyclists at Indianapolis", August 12, 1998.
- Indianapolis Star "Days Are Here", (by Barney Oldfield), May 30, 1912, page 11.
- William F. Nolan, Barney Oldfield, The Life and Times of America's Legendary Speed King, Brown Fox Books, 2002, page 30.
- firstsuperspeedway.com
- Horseless Age, "The Detroit Races", September 16, 1903.
- Automobile Topics, "Eliminators Ready for The Trials", September 22, 1906, page 1758.
- Automobile Topics, "Wednesday, September 5", September 8, 1906, page 1613.
- The Motor World, "In Readiness to Select the American Cup Team", September 20, 1906, page 731.
- Motor Age, "Tracy First in Eliminating Trial", September 27, 1906, page 8.
- Chicago Tribune, "Auto Collision is Fatal", November 24, 1906, page 3.
- Amateur Athletic Foundation, Barney Oldfield Scrapbook
- The Motor World, "The Tale of the First Eliminating Trial", September 28, 1905.
