= Paul Bourillon =

French track cyclist (1877–1942)

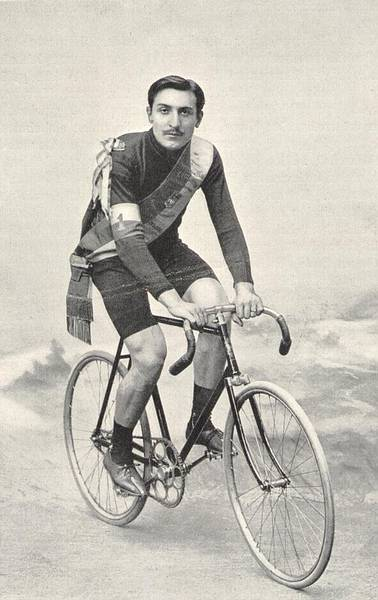
- Bourillon in 1904

Personal information
- Full name: Pierre Ernest Paul Bourillon
- Born: 14 January 1877 Marmande, France
- Died: 14 April 1942 (aged 65) Marmande, France

Cycling career
- Sport: Cycling
- Discipline: Track
- Role: Rider
- Rider type: Sprinter
Medal record
Men's track cycling
Representing France
World Championships
Gold medal – first place	1896 Copenhagen	Sprint

Paul Bourillon (14 January 1877 – 14 April 1942) was a French track cyclist. He won the sprint event at the 1896 ICA Track Cycling World Championships. He also won the French national sprint championships in 1987 and 1899 and the Grand Prix de Paris in 1898.
