= Harrie Meyers =

Dutch track cyclist

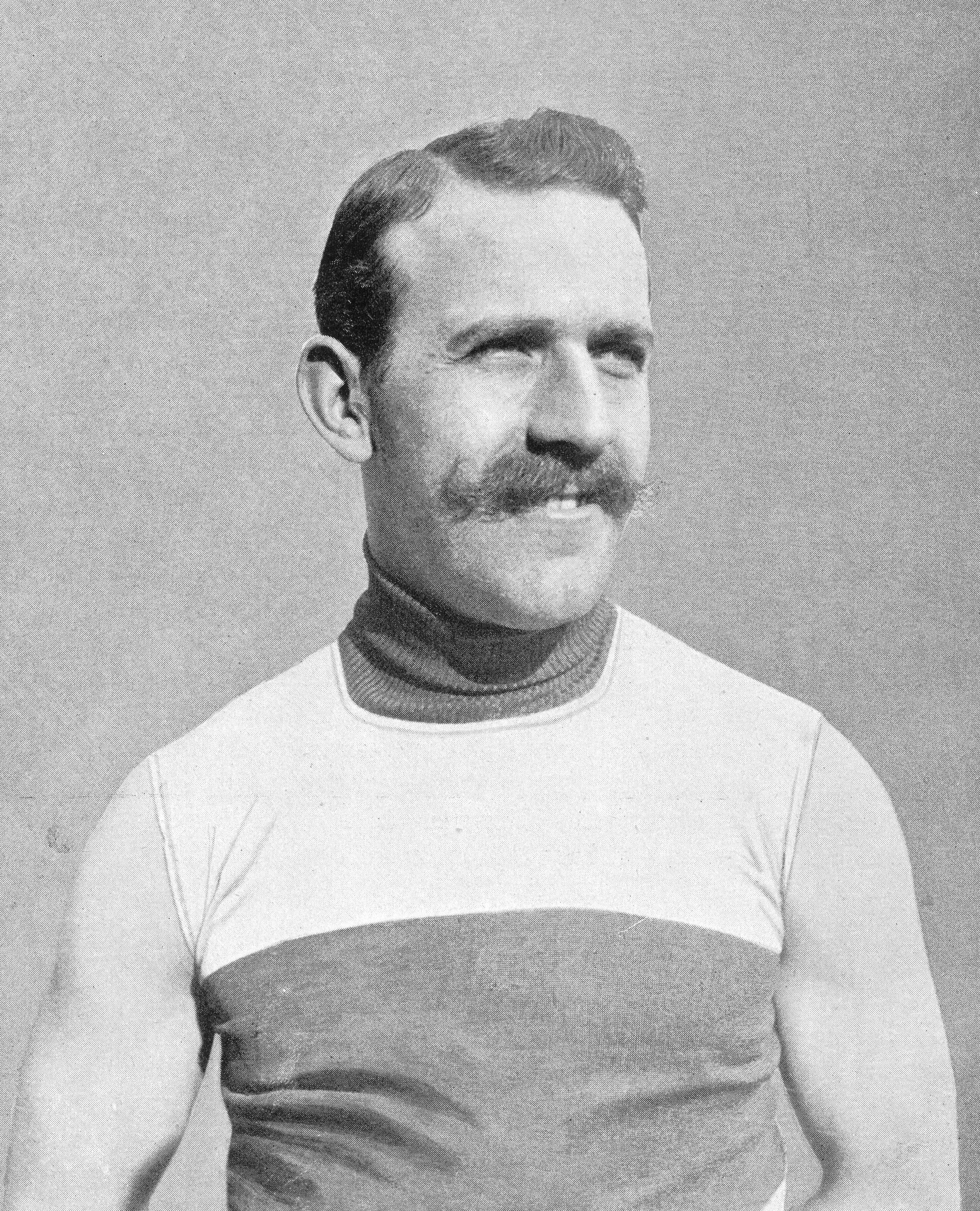

Personal information
- Born: Harie Meijers; 5 December 1879 Maastricht, Netherlands
- Died: 14 April 1928 (aged 48) Maastricht, Netherlands

Cycling career
- Sport: Cycling
- Discipline: Track
- Role: Rider
- Rider type: Sprinter
Medal record
Men's track cycling
Representing Netherlands
World Championships
Silver medal – second place	1900 Paris	Sprint
Silver medal – second place	1902 Rome	Sprint
Bronze medal – third place	1903 Copenhagen	Sprint

Harrie Meyers, also known by his native name Harie Meijers, (5 December 1879 – 14 April 1928) was a Dutch track cyclist. He won a silver medal in the sprint event at the 1900 and 1902 UCI Track Cycling World Championships, as well as a bronze medal in 1903. He also won the Dutch national sprint championships in 1897, 1898, 1899, 1900, 1902 and the Grand Prix de Paris in 1902 and 1903.

At the 1900 Summer Olympics, Meyers won the tandem with Gian Ferdinando Tomaselli and the sprint event. However, these events were not contested for medals. He also won the tandem with Tomaselli at the 1900 UCI Track Cycling World Championships, which was also considered an unofficial event.

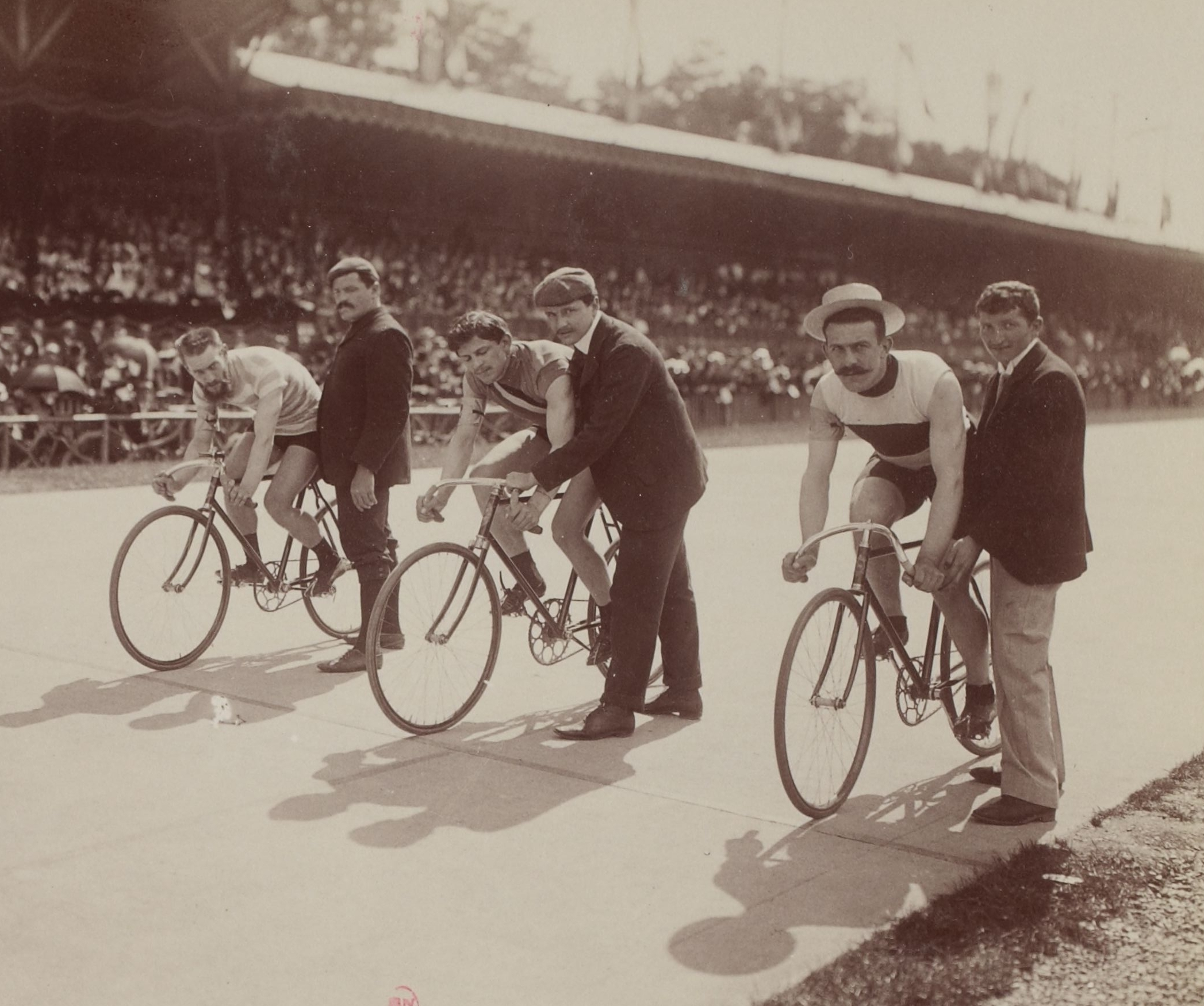
The final of the Grand Prix de Paris on 29 June 1902; from left to right: Alphonse Didier-Nauts, Willy Arend, and Harrie Meyers
