= Émile Bouhours =

French cyclist

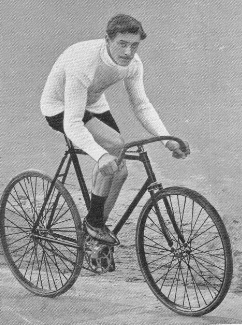
- Bouhours in 1903

Personal information
- Born: 3 June 1870 Monnai, France
- Died: 7 October 1953 (aged 83) La Courneuve, France

Cycling career
- Sport: Cycling
- Role: Rider

Émile Bouhours (3 June 1870 – 7 October 1953) was a French racing cyclist. He won the 1900 Paris–Roubaix race. Bouhours also competed in the 1899 Paris-Dijon race, as well as riding but not finishing the 1913 Tour de France and the Paris - Tours race of the same year.
