= Robert Protin =

Belgian cyclist

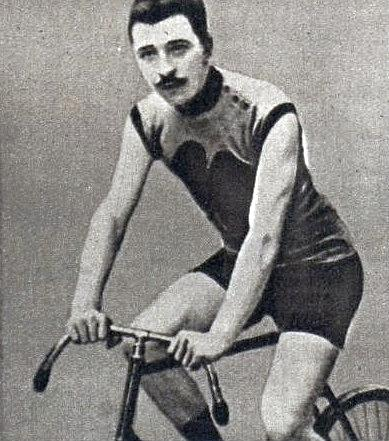

Personal information
- Born: 10 November 1872 Liège, Belgium
- Died: 4 November 1953 (aged 80) Liège, Belgium

Cycling career
- Sport: Cycling
- Disciplines: Road; Track
- Role: Rider
- Rider type: Sprinter
Medal record
Men's track cycling
Representing Belgium
World Championships
Gold medal – first place	1895 Cologne	Sprint

Robert Protin (10 November 1872 – 4 November 1953) was a Belgian road and track cyclist during the 1890s.

== Career ==
Protin was a dominant sprint cyclist during the 1890s. In 1890 he won as an amateur road cyclist the bronze medal at the Belgian National Road Race Championships. On the track he became national champion from 1891 to 1893 and also claimed the French sprint title in 1893, the same year he additionally succeeded in tricycle racing in France.

That same year he had victories in major Grand Prix races in cities such as Florence, Ostend and in the Grand Prix d'Europe, alongside setting a world record over 500 metres on the track. He won the sprint event at the 1895 ICA Track Cycling World Championships.

His best year was 1897; of the hundred races he rode that year, he won eighty-seven, including some prominent titles in locations in Antwerp, Ostend, Tervuren and Vienna.

After his cycling career, Protin became a publisher. In 1892, he was one of the founders of the RFC Liège.
