= Willy Arend =

German cyclist

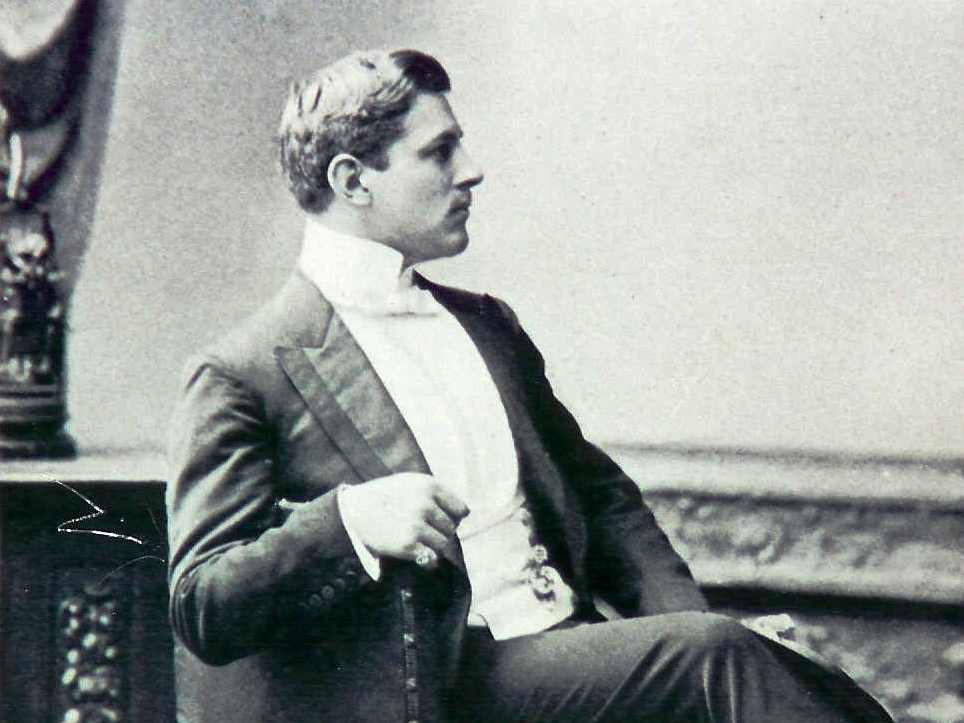
- Arend in 1907.

Personal information
- Born: 2 May 1876 Hanover, Germany
- Died: 25 March 1964 (aged 87) Berlin, Germany

Cycling career
- Sport: Cycling
- Discipline: Track
- Role: Rider
- Rider type: Sprinter

Professional team
- 1908–1910: Dürkopp
Medal record
Men's track cycling
Representing Germany
World Championships
Gold medal – first place	1897 Glasgow	Sprint
Bronze medal – third place	1900 Paris	Sprint
Silver medal – second place	1903 Copenhagen	Sprint

Willy Arend (2 May 1876 – 25 March 1964) was a German track cyclist.

Next to cycling Arend had a cigarette business in Berlin.

== Major results ==
1896
1st National Sprint Championships
1897
1st World Sprint Championships
1st European Sprint Championships
1st National Sprint Championships
1900
3rd World Sprint Championships
1901
1st European Sprint Championships
1903
2nd World Sprint Championships
2nd European Sprint Championships
1904
2nd European Sprint Championships
1910
1st Six Days of Bremen (with Eugen Stabe)
1st Six Days of Kiel (with Eugen Stabe)
1921
1st National Sprint Championships
