= Mathieu Cordang =

Dutch cyclist (1869–1942)

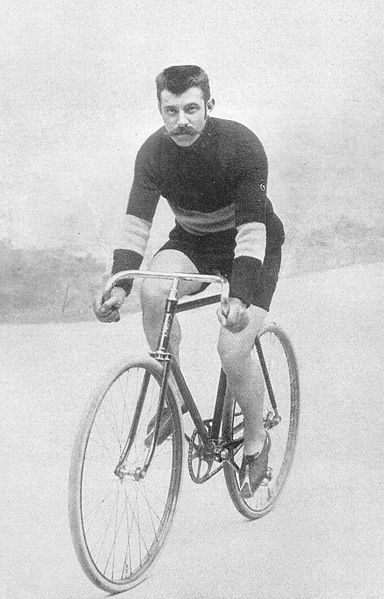
- Cordang in 1910

Personal information
- Full name: Mathieu Cordang
- Nicknames: ReCordang, Monsieur Tabacco
- Born: 6 December 1869 Blerick, the Netherlands
- Died: 24 March 1942 (aged 72) Swalmen, the Netherlands
- Height: 1.61 m (5 ft 3 in)

Cycling career
- Sport: Cycling
- Discipline: Road
- Role: Rider

Mathieu Cordang (6 December 1869 – 24 March 1942) was a Dutch professional cyclist. His specialties were track racing and endurance racing.

== Biography ==
Cordang started racing in 1893, after he left a boat in Vlissingen where a cycling race was being held. He borrowed a bicycle, won the race, and decided to take up cycle-racing.

In 1894, he set a world record for the mile on a tandem, and finished second in the Dutch national road race championships behind Jaap Eden. One year later, he raced a train between Maastricht and Roermond and won. Cordang won the amateur 100 km motor-paced world championship in 1895 in Köln.

Cordang was a professional from 1896 to 1900. In 1897 he finished second in Paris–Roubaix after falling in the velodrome in Roubaix. The winner, Maurice Garin, did not wait for him and won by 30meters. He also rode Bordeaux-Paris in 1897, sponsored by Gladiator, which built a team around him, and provided 25 bicycles. He finished second behind Gaston Rivierre who had extra help in the form of a car. In the same year, Cordang broke five world records on the track of The Crystal Palace in London.

During the Bol d'Or in 1900, Cordang set a 24-hour record of 999.651 km. After that, he won the 3 km race in the 1900 Summer Olympics in Paris. This included professionals, so it is not considered official by the International Olympic Committee.

Cordang ended his career after this. According to his grandson, he stopped because he was cheated too often. Cordang became the owner of a garage company. He died in 1942, largely unnoticed. When a namesake died in 1962, the Dutch press printed obituaries for Cordang.

== Palmares ==
1894

- Amsterdam-Arnhem-Amsterdam
- Maastricht-Nijmegen-Maastricht
- Rotterdam-Utrecht-Rotterdam
- World record 1000 km

1895

- Amsterdam-Arnhem-Amsterdam
- Leiden-Utrecht-Leiden
- Maastricht-Roermond against train
- World champion pace racing

1896

- 5th place Bordeaux-Paris

1897

- 24 hours of Crystal Palace (991,651 km)
- 2nd Bordeaux-Paris
- 2nd Paris–Roubaix
- 3rd 1000 km Défi Routier

1898

- 100 km GP Roubaix
- 100 km GP Amsterdam
- 200 km GP Berlijn

1899

- 100 km GP Den Haag
- World record 24 hours (1000,110 km)

1900

- Olympic Games:
  - Bol d'Or (unofficial event)
  - 3 km (unofficial event)
