= Edmond Jacquelin =

French cyclist

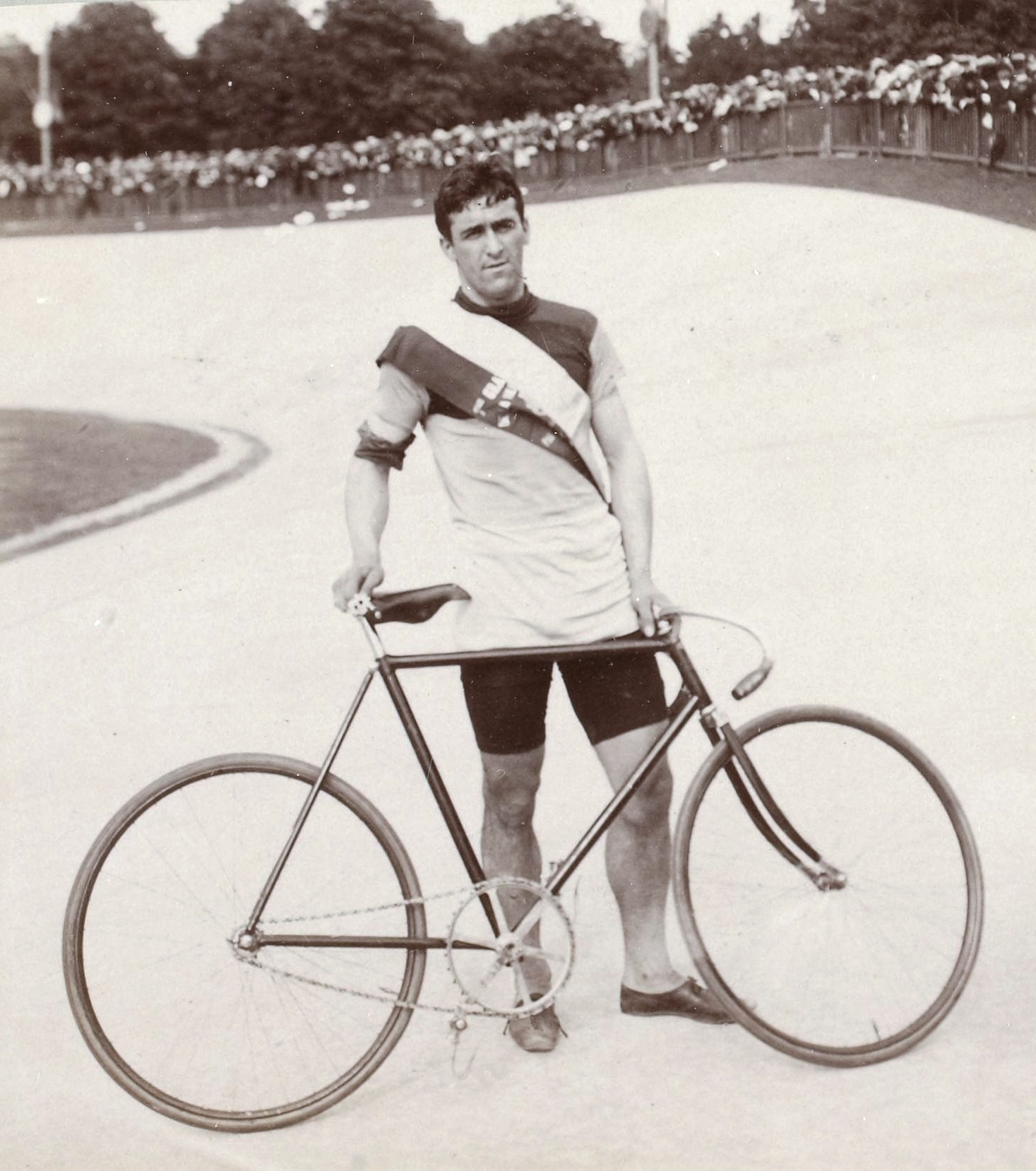
- Jacquelin at the Grand Prix de Paris in 1900

Personal information
- Born: 30 September 1875 Santenay, Côte-d'Or, France
- Died: 29 June 1928 (aged 52) Clichy, Paris, France

Cycling career
- Sport: Cycling
- Discipline: Track
- Role: Rider

Professional team
- 1894–1903: –
Medal record
Men's track cycling
Representing France
World Championships
| Gold medal – first place | 1900 Paris | Sprint |

Edmond Jacquelin (30 September 1875 – 29 June 1928) was a French track cyclist. He won the sprint event at the 1900 world track championships in Paris.
