= UCI World Championships =

Annual competitions determining world champion cyclists

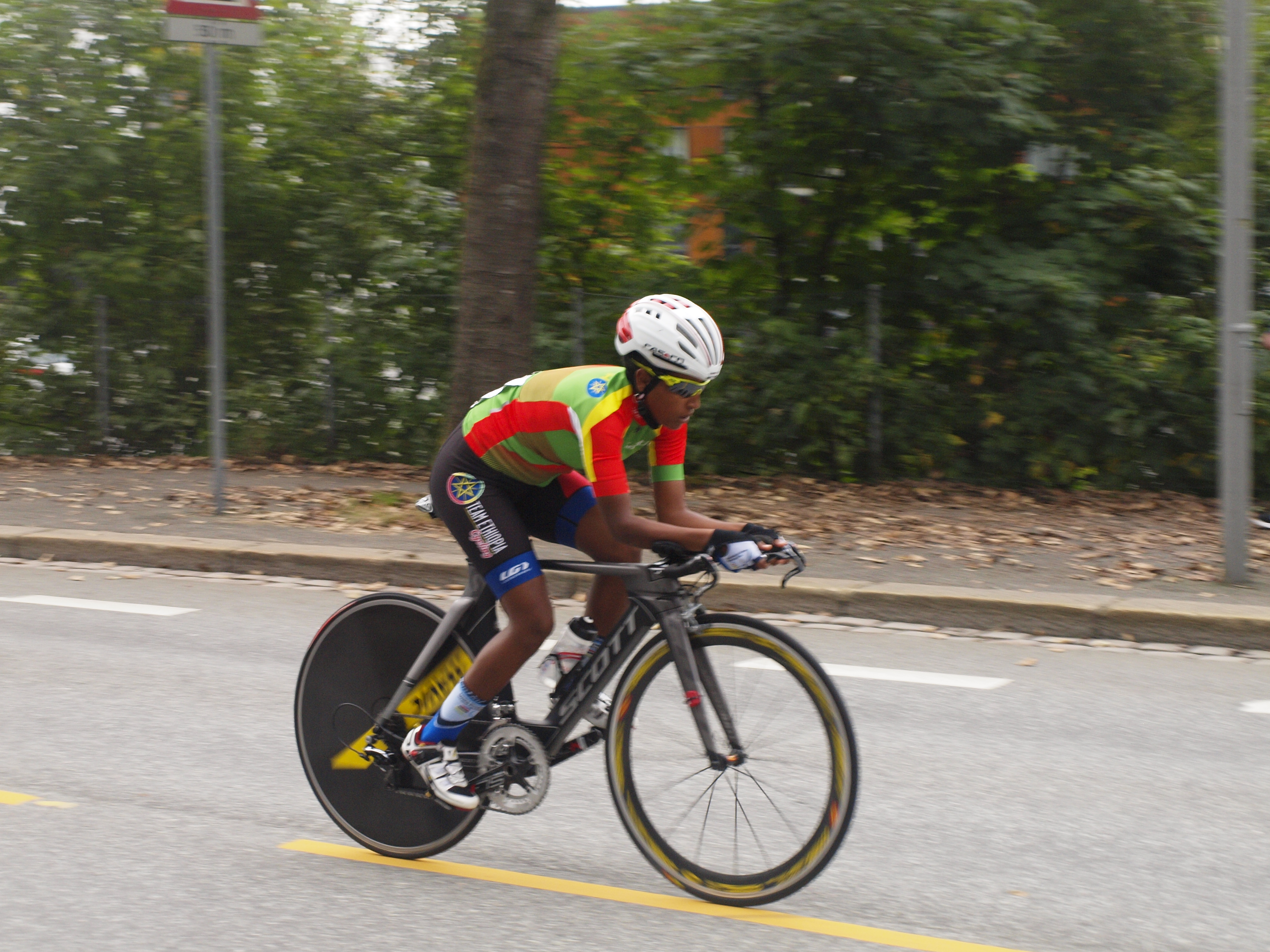
- Eyeru Tesfoam Gebru at the 2017 UCI Road World Championships
- Status: Active
- Genre: Cycling World championship
- Date: Varying
- Frequency: Annual
- Country: Varying
- Inaugurated: 1893
- Organiser: UCI
- Website: www.uci.org

The UCI World Championships are annual competitions promoted by the Union Cycliste Internationale (UCI) to determine world champion cyclists. They are held in several different styles of racing, in a different country each year. Championship winners wear a white jersey with coloured bands around the chest for the following year. The similarity to the colours of a rainbow gives them the colloquial name of "the rainbow jersey." The first three individuals or teams in each championship win gold, silver and bronze medals. Former world champions are allowed to wear a trim to their collar and sleeves in the same pattern as the rainbow jersey.

Championships are held for men and for women in road cycling, track cycling, cyclo-cross, mountain biking, gravel, BMX, and indoor cycling. There are also championships for disabled competitors.

== History ==
The first recognised world championships were promoted by the International Cycling Association, a body formed in November 1892 by cycling bodies from Britain, Canada, France, Holland, Italy, Germany and Belgium. The ICA was formed at the initiative of the National Cyclists' Union in Britain. Until then its own championships, open to riders from any country, were considered the unofficial championships of the world. It was because the sport needed world championships independent of any national body that Henry Sturmey of the magazine The Cyclist and later founder of the Sturmey-Archer gear company proposed an International Cyclists Association in 1892.

The first recognised world championship was held in Chicago in 1893, with track races at one mile, 10 kilometres, and a 100 km race in which riders were paced by tandems of up to six riders. An American, Arthur Augustus Zimmerman, won the mile and 10 km races and a South African, Mentjes, won the 100 km.

The 1894 championship in Antwerp were, like Chicago, for amateurs. Lehr, a German, won the mile, Jaap Eden of Holland won the 10 km and Henie of Norway the 100 km.

Professionals raced from 1895, in Cologne, when Jimmy Michael of Britain won the 100 km.

The definition of amateurs and professionals was important for the International Cycling Association, to which the National Cyclists Union would allow only national bodies which shared its own strict definition of amateurism. That definition excluded the main French body, the Union Vélocipèdique Française, which had been allowed to observe the founding meeting but not to vote. French discontent at that exclusion, and that the British insisted on separate votes for England, Wales, Ireland and its colonies, led France and other countries to set up a rival body before the 1900 races. The Union Cycliste Internationale became the world governing body and the International Cycling Association vanished.

In 2023, the various UCI World Championships were held in the same location for the first time, with 190 world titles awarded at the 2023 UCI Cycling World Championships in Glasgow, Scotland. This will be held every 4 years in future, with the 2027 edition to be held in Haute-Savoie, France.

== Elite World Championships ==
=== Current championships ===
- UCI Track World Championships
- UCI Road World Championships
- UCI Cyclo-cross World Championships
- UCI Indoor Cycling World Championships
- UCI Mountain Bike World Championships
- UCI Mountain Bike Marathon World Championships
- UCI Mountain Bike Eliminator World Championships
- UCI Mountain Bike Enduro World Championships
- UCI BMX Racing World Championships
- UCI Urban Cycling World Championships
- UCI Pump Track World Championships
- UCI Cycling Esports World Championships
- UCI Gravel World Championships
- UCI Snow Bike World Championships
- UCI Para-cycling Track World Championships
- UCI Para-cycling Road World Championships

=== Defunct championships ===
- UCI B World Championships

== Junior World Championships ==
=== Road cycling ===
- 1975–2004: part of UCI Road World Championships
- 2005–2009: part of UCI Juniors World Championships
- 2010: 2010 UCI Juniors Road World Championships
- 2011–current: part of UCI Road World Championships

=== Track cycling ===
- 2005–2009: part of UCI Juniors World Championships
- 2010–current: UCI Juniors Track World Championships

== See also ==
- UCI World Cup
- UCI Gran Fondo World Championships
- World MTB Orienteering Championships
- Asian Cycling Championships
