= 1893 ICA Track Cycling World Championships =

Track Championships

- Venue: Chicago, United States
- Date: 11–12 August 1893
- Velodrome: South Side Park
- Events: 3

The 1893 Track Cycling World Championships were the inaugural world championships for track cycling. Before then there had been events described as world championships but without ratification by a world cycling authority. The creation of the International Cycling Association in 1892 made internationally recognised championships possible.

They took place in Chicago, United States. There were three events: sprint, stayers' race (motor-paced) and a 10 km, now classified as a scratch race. The rules allowed for a team race but it was not held. Races were held only for amateurs. Winners received a gold medal and all other participants a silver.

The USA took two of the three gold medals. The table below shows the position had gold, silver and bronze medals been awarded.

== Event overview ==
The first Track Cycling World Championship was held over two days from August 11 to 12. Three events were held at the event with them being the Sprint, Motor-paced and the 10 km. These events were part of the Chicago World's Fair which took place August 5–12. The three events was part of a week long schedule that also held local events with the major international races being on the weekend. Competitors from ten nations competed in the week long events with the main favorites being the American riders W.W Windle, Arthur Augustus Zimmerman and John S. Johnson.

The first two races of the weekend was the 10 km and the sprint. In the 10 km, Zimmerman broke the national record with a time of 15:33 3–5. This improved on the previous record that was set by Seeley in the previous year by three minutes and seven seconds. Julian Perrin Bliss and Johnson rounded out the top three for the United States as every American but Bodes finished ahead of the internationals. Zimmerman then recorded a second win of the night as he won the sprint in only twenty-seven seconds, finishing well ahead of Johnston and Bliss who finished second and third where only American and Canadians riders competed.

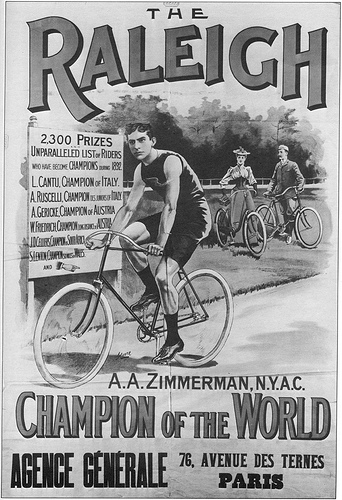
Arthur Zimmerman's world title was good advertising for the Raleigh bike brand

The final major international race of the weekend was in the motor-paced with Lawrence Meintjes being the only non-American rider to win a medal at the championships as he finished ahead of Ernst Emil Ulbricht.

== Medal summary ==
Event	Gold	Silver	Bronze
Men's Amateur Events
Sprint	Arthur Zimmerman; United States	John S. Johnson; United States	Julian Perrin Bliss; United States
Motor-paced	Lawrence Meintjes; Transvaal	Ernst Emil Ulbricht; United States	
10 km	Arthur Zimmerman; United States	Julian Perrin Bliss; United States	John S. Johnson; United States

== Medal table ==
Rank	Nation	Gold	Silver	Bronze	Total
1	United States (USA)	2	3	2	7
2	Transvaal (South African Republic)	1	0	0	1
Totals (2 entries)		3	3	2	8
