= Arthur Zimmerman =

Arthur Zimmerman may refer to:

- Arthur Zimmermann (1864–1940), State Secretary for Foreign Affairs of the German Empire
- Arthur Augustus Zimmerman (1869–1936), cycling sprint rider

== See also ==
- Arthur Zimmermann (1864–1940), State Secretary for Foreign Affairs of the German Empire
