= Major Road Network =

Classification of local authority roads in England

Map of the proposed Major Road Network (blue) and existing Strategic Road Network (green)

The Major Road Network (MRN) is a classification of local authority roads in England. It incorporates the National Highways-controlled Strategic Road Network (SRN) and the more major local authority controlled A roads. This network accounts for around 4 per cent of the nation's road length but 43 per cent of the traffic flows. It is designed to allow central government funding to be more effectively targeted towards the more economically critical road infrastructure. The system was proposed by the Rees Jeffreys Road Fund in October 2017 and adopted by the government in its 2017 Transport Investment Strategy. The MRN scheme was implemented in late 2018 and local authorities were required to submit proposals for £3.5 billion of funding for new schemes to be constructed 2020-25.

== 2016 Rees Jeffreys Road Fund report ==
The creation of the Major Road Network was proposed in the October 2016 Rees Jeffreys Road Fund report A Major Road Network for England written by David Quarmby and Phil Carey. The authors stated that the existing 4,200-mile (6,800 km) Highways England (now National Highways) Strategic Road Network (SRN), which accounts for 2 per cent of England's roads but 33 per cent of its traffic did not sufficiently safeguard the economically-critical parts of the road network. The remaining 98 per cent of the network is currently under the control of 153 separate local authorities. Quarmby and Carey proposed a new classification of roads combining the SRN with 3,800 miles (6,100 km) of the most important local authority A roads. This expanded network would account for 43 per cent of the nation's traffic and 4 per cent of its road length.

Quarmby and Carey proposed that A roads with average daily traffic flows in excess of 20,000 vehicles be included into the MRN along with roads with average daily traffic flows in excess of 10,000 where more than 5 per cent of traffic was heavy goods vehicles or more than 15 per cent were light goods vehicles. Additional roads were added to link all towns with a population in excess of 50,000 persons to the network, remove isolated sections of road and reflect predicted growth to 2040.

The MRN would be separated into four tiers:

- Tier 1 – limited-access roads devoted to movement between major urban areas and subject to the highest speeds
- Tier 1A – limited-access roads in urban areas with heavier traffic flows, more frequent junctions and require more oversight by a regional authority or city
- Tier 2 – multiple-access roads, usually rural A roads which link secondary urban areas but may have frontages and local access uses
- Tier 3 – multiple-access major roads in urban areas, often with a mix of user types and conflicting movements

Quarmby and Carey did not propose transferring responsibility for the MRN from the current maintainers and operators to an enlarged Highways England but suggested that Highways England surpluses resulting from the reallocation of Vehicle Excise Duty receipts to the organisation could be forwarded to local authorities to support the maintenance of the network. The proposal was designed to work hand-in-hand with the regional devolution of transport under the new sub-national transport bodies (Transport for the North, Midlands Connect and England's Economic Heartland). As it stands the local authority roads network, accounting for 98 per cent of the nation's road length faces declining central government funding and a confusing system of applying for capital expenditure. There is a significant difference in funding available for the HE SRN and the economically-critical local authority major roads. The greater use of technology-driven solutions for MRN roads was also suggested, in a similar way to how the SRN has seen more technology investment, such as with smart motorways.

== 2017 Department for Transport consultation ==
In December 2017 the Department for Transport (DfT) issued a report, entitled Moving Britain Ahead, which outlined further details of the proposed MRN which the government had committed to earlier in 2017 within its Transport Investment Strategy. The government's aims were to reduce congestion, support economic growth in the regions, increase housebuilding outputs, meet the needs of all road users and to create resilience within the network. A public consultation on questions of the principles behind the MRN, the criteria used to define the MRN and the proposed funding ran until March 2018.

== Implementation ==
The Major Road Network was implemented in late 2018 when the DfT issued maps of the roads to local authorities. The maps were not released to the public. The DfT called for local authorities to submit bids so that 10 top priority schemes in each region could be considered for funding in the 2020-25 budget period. £3.5 billion was made available from the DfT's National Roads Fund, though there is a requirement for a 15% contribution from local authority or third party sources. The submissions deadline was Summer 2019. The network has since been published with the data being made available for download.
