= Stanley Cotterell =

British founder of the Cyclists' Touring Club

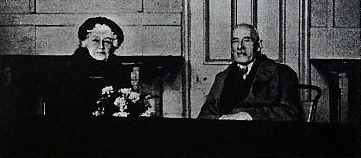
- Mrs Jeanie Welford and Stanley Cotterell in 1938 in Harrogate
- Born: 1857; Ilfracombe, Devon, England
- Died: 1939 (aged 81–82)
- Occupation: Physician
- Known for: Founder of the Cyclists' Touring Club

Stanley John Ambrose Cotterell (1857–1939) founded the Bicycle Touring Club at Harrogate, Yorkshire on 5 August 1878, while he was a medical student. Its headquarters were wherever he happened to be living. By 1883, the Bicycle Touring Club was renamed to the Cyclists' Touring Club to open membership to tricyclists.

== Biography ==
Cotterell was born in 1857 in Ilfracombe, Devon. He studied medicine in Edinburgh. One of Cotterell's earliest tasks at the Cyclists Touring Club was to set up the first network of hotels. He enlisted members' help and appointed regional officials such that, by 1881, he had 785 establishments under contract with the CTC, offering fixed tariffs, reserved rooms, and exclusive lounges for cyclists to use.

== Commemoration ==
=== The Golden Book ===
Cotterell's achievements were celebrated in 1938 when Cycling Weekly awarded him his own page in the Golden Book of Cycling, which is now held in 'The Pedal Club' archive. Cotterell, who was the first member, was photographed with Jeanie Welford, who was the first female member.

=== CTC 75th anniversary ===
In 1953, to commemorate the 75th anniversary of the Cyclists Touring Club, Cotterell's foundation ride from Edinburgh to Harrogate on a 'High Ordinary' bicycle was re-enacted. Additionally, a commemorative plaque was unveiled in Harrogate.

=== Cotterell House ===
In 1966, the National Headquarters of the Cyclists Touring Club moved to 'Cotterell House', 69 Meadrow, Godalming, Surrey. This building was subsequently sold and redeveloped.
