= Ernst Emil Ulbricht =

American cyclist (1864–1900)

Emil Ulbricht
Personal information
- Full name: Ernst Emil Ulbricht
- Born: 23 February 1864 Helmsdorf, Kingdom of Saxony
- Died: 15 July 1900 (aged 36) Makapuʻu Point, Territory of Hawaii

Cycling career
- Sport: Cycling
- Discipline: Track
- Role: Rider
- Rider type: Stayer

Amateur team

Ernst Emil Ulbricht (1864–1900) was a German-born American racing cyclist and winner of the silver medal in the Stayer competition at International Cycling Association's first World Championships in Chicago in 1893. As a road racer he won the time prize in the 1894 and 1895 editions of the Santa Monica Road Race.

== Death ==
By 1900, Ulbricht was working for the Honolulu Iron Works. During a weekend excursion he drowned after being taken by surprise by a huge wave near Makapuʻu Point in Hawaii. His body was found a few days later inside a giant shark that was captured and killed by local fishermen. After the autopsy the coroner concluded that the corpse must have been eaten by the shark after drowning.
