= Transport for the North =

English sub-national transport body

Transport for the North (TfN)

Agency overview
- Formed: 2018
- Type: Sub-national transport body
- Headquarters: Manchester
- Employees: 122
- Agency executives: David Skaith and Louise Gittins (interim), chair; Katie Day (interim), chief executive
- Website: transportforthenorth.com

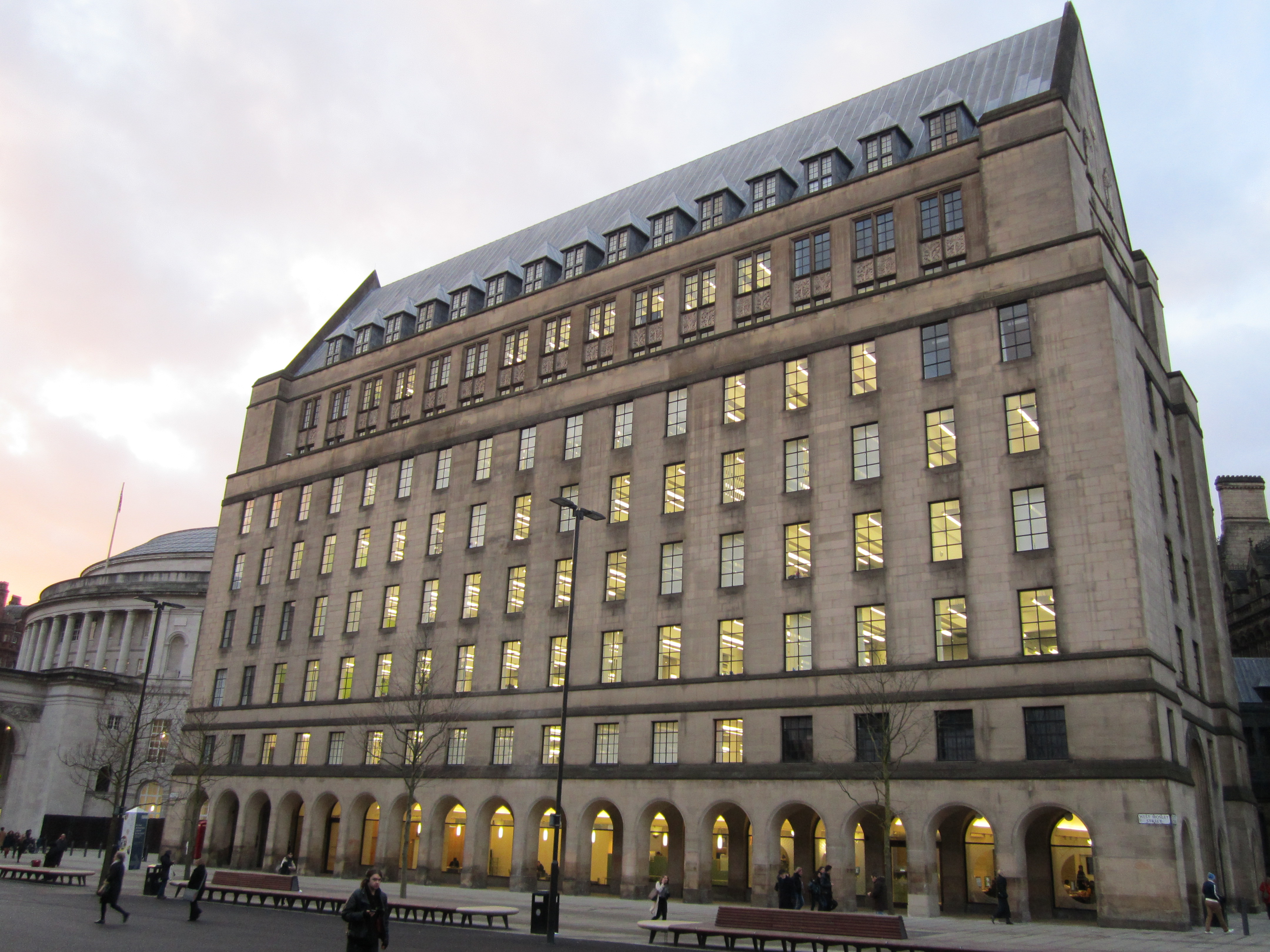
Town Hall Extension, Transport for the North head office

Transport for the North (TfN) is the first statutory sub-national transport body in England outside of Greater London. It was formed in 2018 to make the case for strategic transport improvements across the North of England. Creating this body represented an unprecedented devolution of power from central government. TfN brings together the North's twenty local transport authorities and business leaders together with Network Rail, National Highways, and HS2 and works with the UK Government. The organisation has offices in Manchester and Leeds.

== About ==
TfN is a partnership of public and private sector representatives working with the UK Government and national transport bodies to develop and deliver strategic transport infrastructure across the North of England. Through the Cities and Local Government Devolution Act 2016, a statutory instrument was laid before Parliament in November 2017. Following approval, TfN's functions have been enshrined in the Sub-national Transport Body (Transport for the North) Regulations 2018 (SI 2018/103) which came in to force in April 2018. TfN is a statutory partner to the Department for Transport, National Highways, and Network Rail to ensure that the North's pan-Northern strategic transport priorities are developed and delivered.

TfN's work is to align with the statutory local transport plan of the existing local transport authorities, as no powers have been taken away from local government. The Cities and Local Government Devolution Act 2016 as amended states that TfN's constituent authorities must 'exercise transport functions with a view to securing the implementation of the proposals contained in the STB's transport strategy.'

== Constituent authorities ==
Interactive map of constituent authorities

The TfN Board comprises strategic authority mayors or other elected representatives from the 11 TfN constituent authorities.

- Cheshire and Warrington Combined Authority
- Cumbria Combined Authority
- Greater Manchester Combined Authority
- Hull and East Yorkshire Combined Authority
- Lancashire Combined County Authority
- Liverpool City Region Combined Authority
- North East Mayoral Strategic Authority
- South Yorkshire Mayoral Combined Authority
- Tees Valley Combined Authority
- West Yorkshire Combined Authority
- York and North Yorkshire Combined Authority

== Governance ==
In January 2018, legislation was approved in the House of Commons to establish TfN as the first sub-national transport body in England outside of Greater London. The legislation was approved following consent from 56 local authorities in the North. The statutory body came in to force on 1 April 2018.

As a statutory body, TfN's powers include:

- Producing a statutory transport strategy, which the Government of the time must formally consider in the decision-making process.
- Funding organisations to deliver transport projects.
- Working with local transport authorities to fund, promote and deliver road schemes.
- Be consulted on all rail franchises that provide services in the North.
- Take forward smart ticketing on public transport.

The functions of "Rail North", an existing association of local authorities, are now the responsibility of TfN, which include currently co-managing with the Department for Transport the Northern Trains and TransPennine Express rail franchises with the Government. The Rail North Committee comprises representatives from the 11 TfN constituent authorities and the following four non-constituent authorities:

- East Midlands Combined County Authority
- Greater Lincolnshire Combined County Authority
- Staffordshire County Council
- Stoke-on-Trent City Council

== Strategic Transport Plan ==
The TfN Board approved the Strategic Transport Plan in February 2019 following consultation between January – April 2018.

The Plan sets out the case for investment in transport across the North by 2050, along with the key strategic transport infrastructure requirements. The work is being informed by the Northern Powerhouse Independent Economic Review (NPIER). This analysis has shown that the North of England has significant potential, and could generate:

- £92 billion (15%) increase in GVA.
- 850,000 additional jobs.
- 4% higher productivity than in a business as usual scenario.

The objectives of the Strategic Transport Plan are to:

- Increasing efficiency, reliability, integration, and resilience in the transport system
- Transforming economic performance
- Improving inclusivity, health, and access to opportunities for all
- Promoting and enhancing the built, historic, and natural environment

TfN programmes of work include:

Northern Powerhouse Rail – a £39 billion major strategic rail programme, transforming connectivity between the key economic centres of the North, including Manchester, Leeds, Sheffield, Hull, Newcastle and Liverpool – and the North's largest international airport, Manchester Airport. TfN's analysis suggests that it could increase the number of people within one hour of four of the largest cities in the North from less than 10,000 to 1.3 million. TfN have also stated that Northern Powerhouse Rail could bring Manchester Airport within 90 minutes reach of 3 million more people.

The Strategic Transport Plan has set out an 'emerging vision' for Northern Powerhouse Rail, and will be delivered over a 30-year programme. This vision is:

- A new line linking Leeds and Manchester via Bradford, including the option for a Bradford city centre station
- A new twin-track line linking Liverpool to HS2 and onwards to Manchester, via Warrington and Manchester Airport
- Significant upgrades and integration with HS2 linking Leeds and Sheffield
- Significant upgrades between Sheffield, Leeds and Hull
- Significant upgrades of the Hope Valley corridor between Manchester and Sheffield
- Significant upgrades between Newcastle and Leeds

Journey times and service frequency

The current expected service frequencies and journey times between Northern Cities from Northern Powerhouse Rail:

	Journey time before NPR (hr:min)	Journey time with NPR (hr:min)	Service frequency before NPR (trains per hour)	Service frequency with NPR (trains per hour)
Manchester – Liverpool	0:37–0:57	0:26	4	6
Manchester – Leeds	0:46–0:58	0:25	4	6
Manchester – Sheffield	0:49–0:57	0:40	2	4
Sheffield – Hull	1:20–1:26	0:50	1	2
Sheffield – Leeds	0:39–0:42	0:28	1	4
Leeds – Hull	0:57	0:38	1	2
Leeds – Newcastle	1:28–1:35	0:58	3	4

The Strategic Transport Plan sets out that using planned HS2 infrastructure, junctions could be built to support Northern Powerhouse Rail services. These could be on the:

- HS2 mainline for Leeds – North East services
- HS2 Leeds spur to facilitate through services via existing Leeds station
- HS2 mainline for Sheffield – Leeds services
- HS2 Manchester spur for Manchester – Liverpool services
- South facing junction on HS2 mainline for London – Liverpool services

The Strategic Outline Business Case has been submitted to Government, with further investment decisions likely to be made in the Comprehensive Spending Review. An additional £37 million of funding has been confirmed for 2019/20.

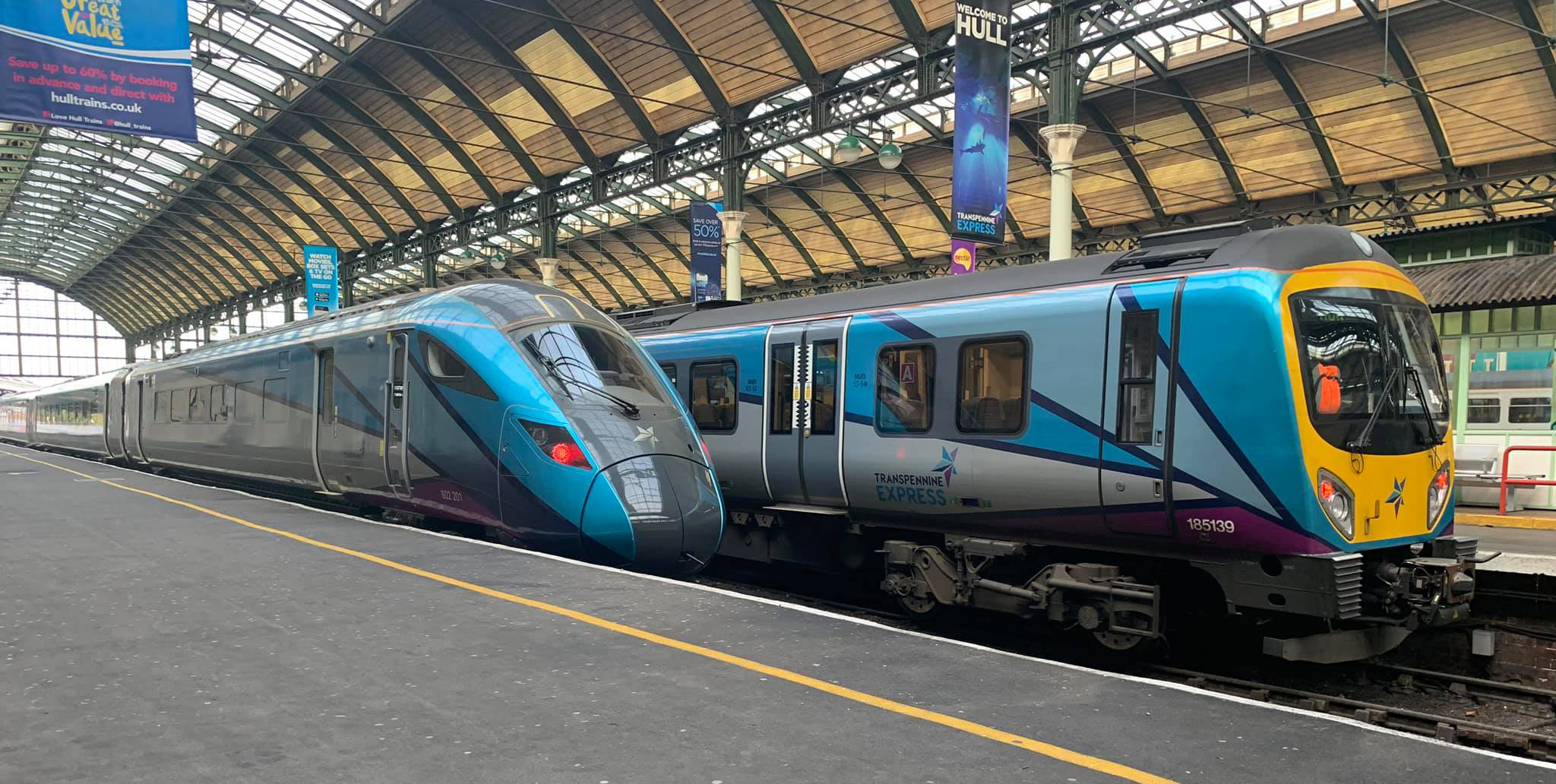
New and refurbished TransPennine Express rolling stock at Hull Station

Long Term Rail Strategy - TfN has sets out an ambitious vision to transform the North's railway network with new major investment projects and services. Currently, rail is only 1.1% share of total trips in the North, and currently rail passengers are three times higher than 20 years ago, growth of 6.3% per year, while capacity has only increased by an average of 6.45% over the same period.

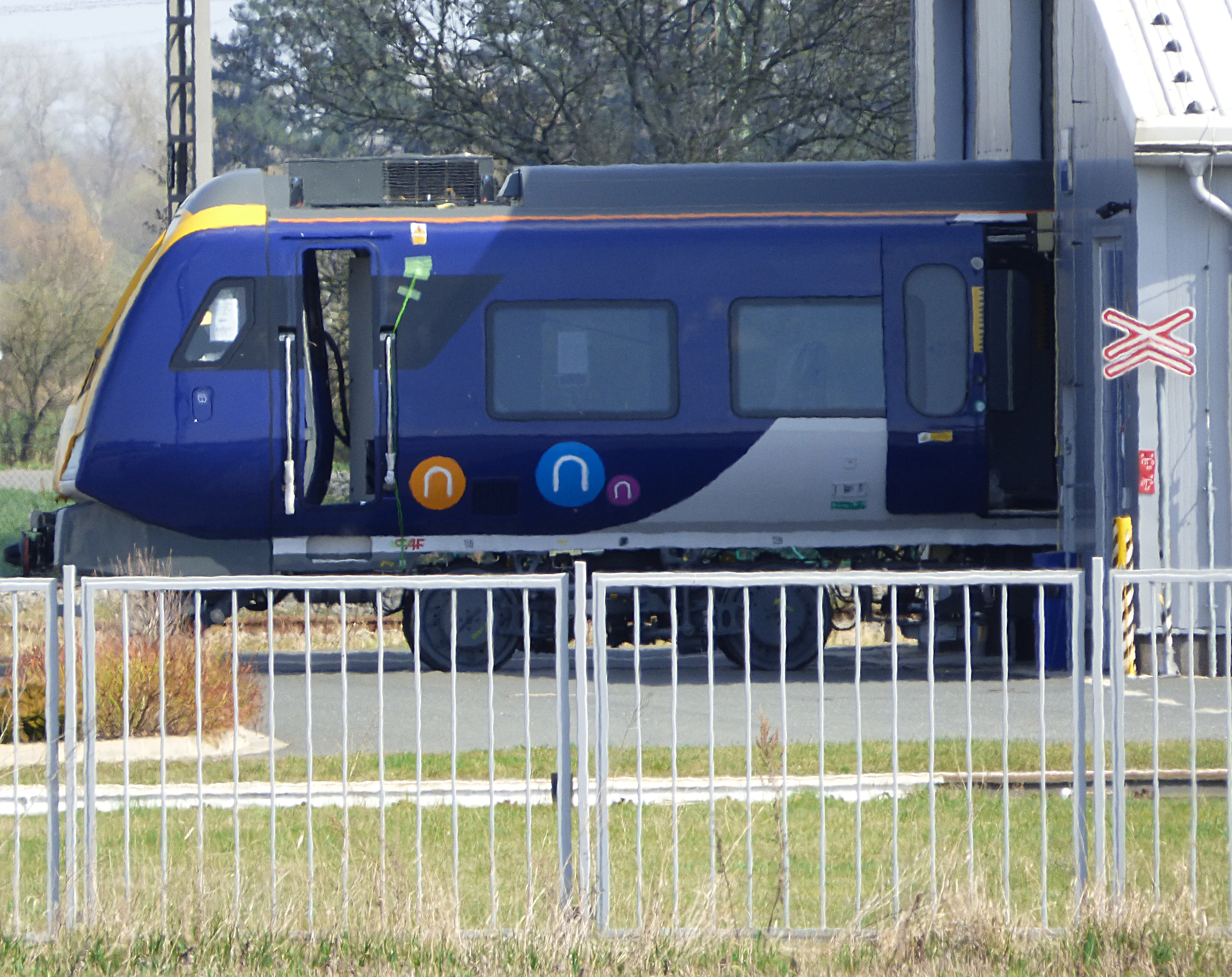
New Arriva Rail North rolling stock

Minimum standards for the rail network will include:

- Minimum two trains per hour
- Journey times of at least 80 mph for long-distance services, at least 60 mph for inter-urban services, and at least 40 mph for local and suburban services
- Ensure the rail network accommodates for freight, including longer and heavier trains, and clearance of structures on the network (also known as gauge clearance) as there is not currently a cleared route across the Pennines
- A 50% improvement in the average speed of freight services by 2028
- Rail connections to serve each of the North's international airports
- Infrastructure to enable a weekday inter-peak level service on Sundays and bank holidays
- The North's major ports in the North to be served by a railway to support future growth of rail freight

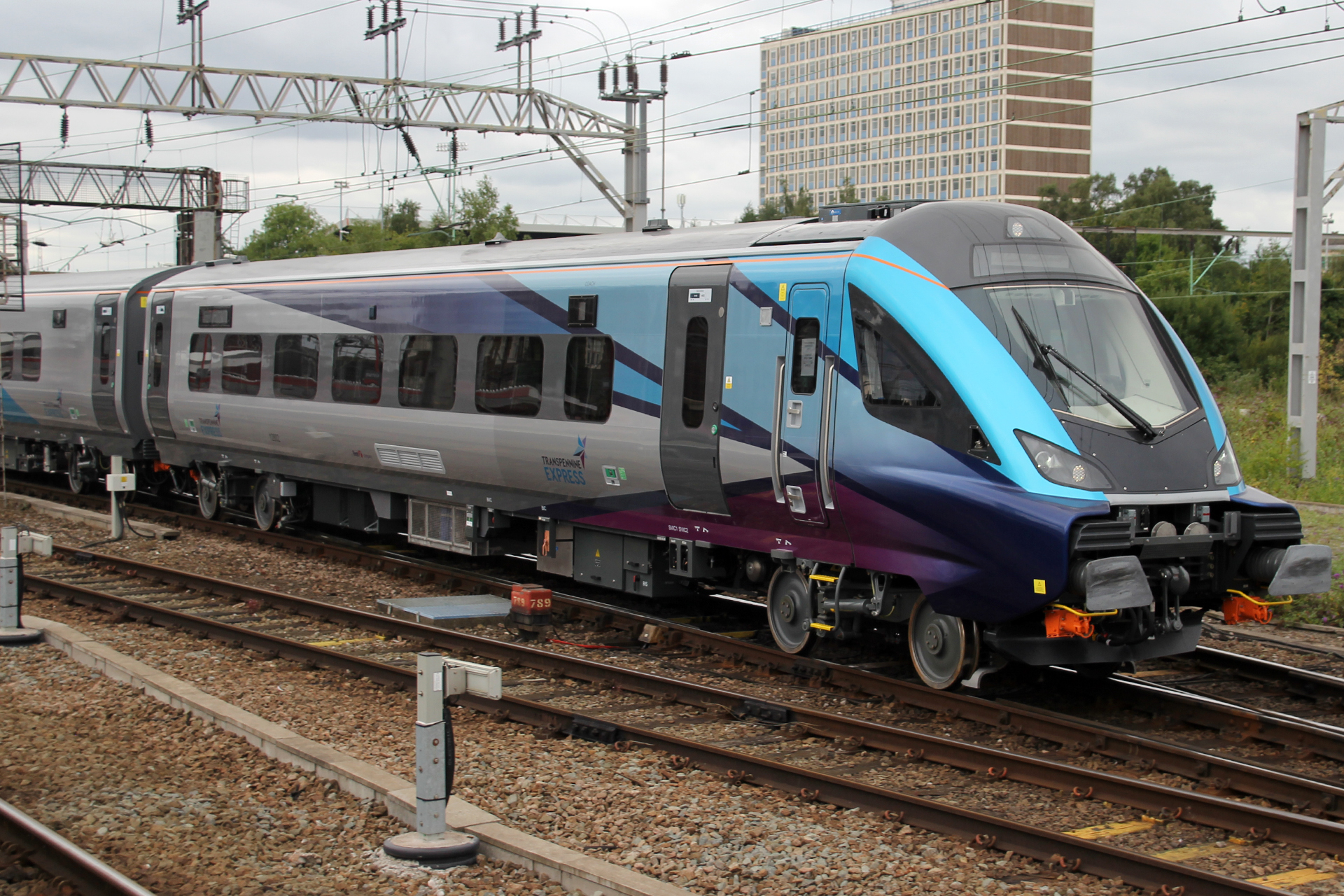
New rolling stock for the TransPennine Express franchise

Through Rail North, the TransPennine Express and Arriva Rail North franchises will transform the North rail network, delivering the ambition and specification set out by TfN. This includes:

- £1.5 billion investment on rolling stock, including 500 new or refurbished train carriages
- 2,000 extra services a week by 2019
- £60 million investment at stations

The Draft Major Road Network, as consulted on by the Department for Transport

Major Road Network for the North – TfN has set out a Major Road Network for the North, which includes Highways England's Strategic Roads Network and local transport authority managed roads. The Major Road Network for the North is around 8,000 km or 7% of the North's roads. This formed key evidence for the Department for Transport's development of a Major Road Network for England. The Major Road Network for the North aims to:

- Enable international connectivity to ports and airports
- Support agglomeration economies
- Support growth in key employment and housing sites
- Increase the resilience of the economy
- Enable efficient journeys by different modes of transport
- Improve access to opportunities

New funding for this network was announced in October 2018 for two schemes;

- A new section of the York Outer Ring Road.
- Grizebeck Bypass, near Barrow in Furness.

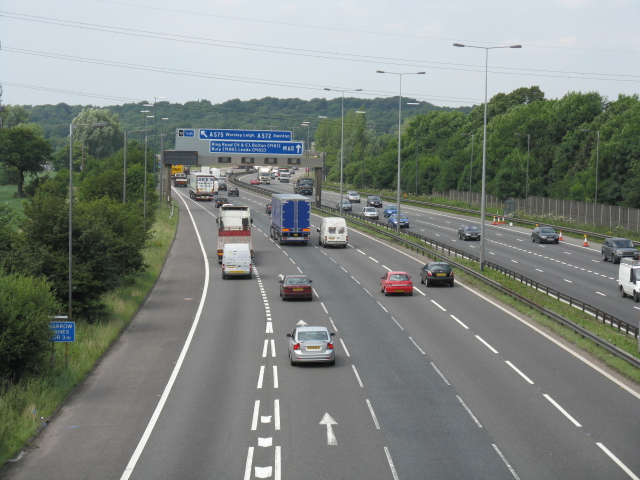
Part of the M60 in North West Manchester

Strategic Roads Studies – TfN have been undertaking three road studies, with progress updates set out in the draft Strategic Transport Plan:

- Trans Pennine Tunnel Strategic Study – providing significantly improved road connectivity between Greater Manchester and Sheffield City Region. The draft Strategic Transport Plan has stated that a long tunnel under the Peak District National Park is technically feasible, but the cost would be substantial and offer poor value for money. TfN have now set out that they are developing alternative options that will be more cost-effective. TfN suggest that the most promising alternative is a partially tunnelled route on the A628, with wider road enhancements, including on the M60, M67 and M1.
- Northern Trans Pennine Routes Study – developing the case for improving the A66 between the A1 at Scotch Corner and the M6 at Penrith, including improvements to the A69 between Newcastle and Carlisle.
- Manchester North West Quadrant Strategic Study – Exploring options for significant improvements to sections of the M60, M62, M602, M61 and M66.
- Central Pennines Study – The Department for Transport announced in March 2019 that TfN will be working with Highways England to look at major improvements to road connections between the M65 in East Lancashire across to Yorkshire.

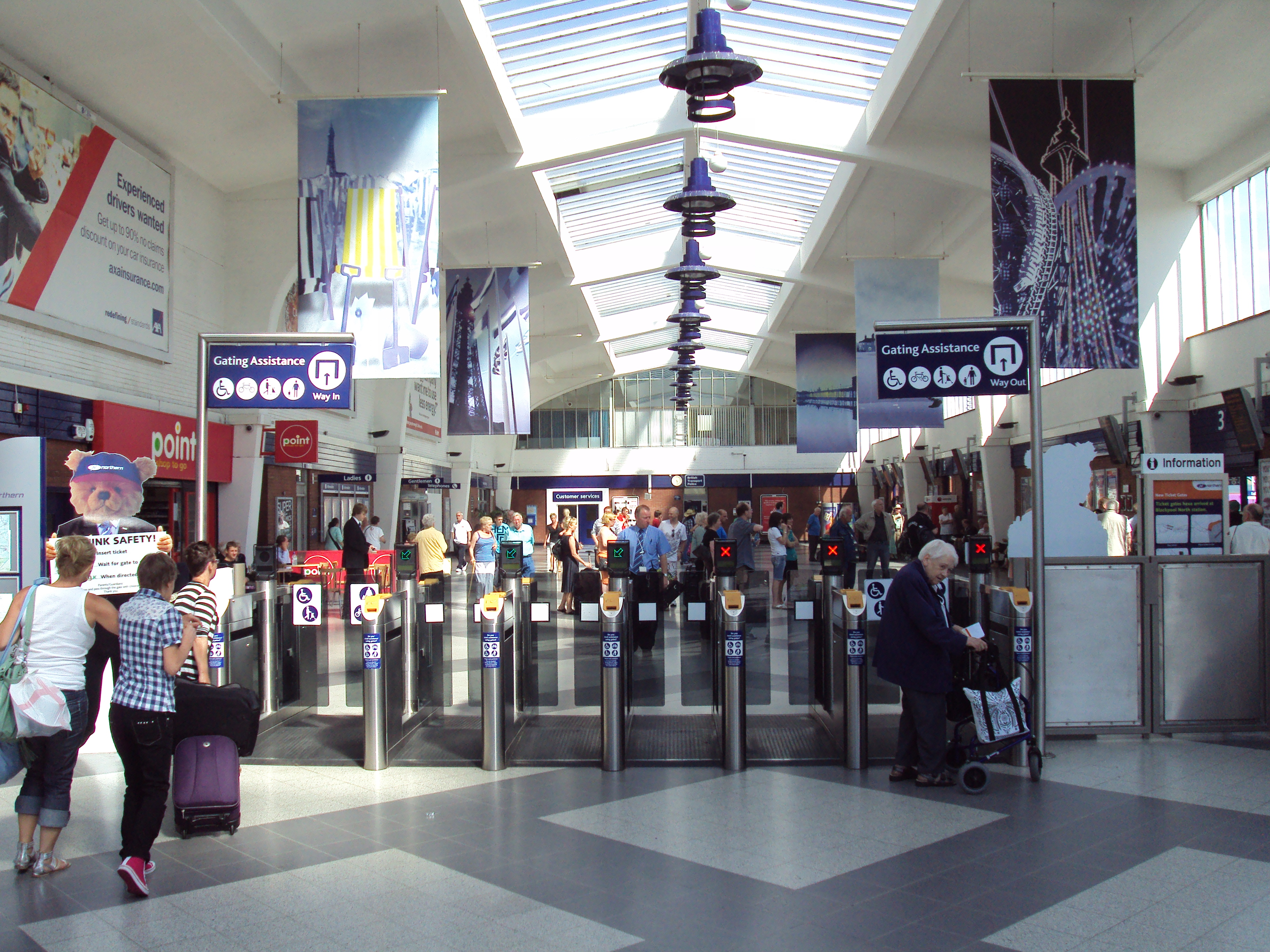
Contactless payments across public transport in the North

Integrated and Smart Travel (IST) – a smart ticketing programme to allow seamless travel on public transport across the North. It was proposed that emerging technologies would allow modern payment methods and mobile travel information on all public transport in the North. Paying for journeys would become quicker, easier and more convenient. TfN was delivering a £150 million government-funded programme.

The programme was to be delivered in three phases:

- Phase One – Smartcards on rail – as part of a national programme for smart ticketing on all rail travel.
- Phase Two – Customer information, collaboration and innovation – open data and disruption information for rail and bus passengers to support single and multi-mode journeys.
- Phase Three – Account-based travel – allowing passengers to make contactless bank card payments with a 'fair price promise' with a capping of fares on all modes of public transport.

In January 2021 the Department for Transport announced there would be no further UK Government funding for IST, as a result of which the programme will be wound down during 2021/22.

Strategic Development Corridors – identifying transport infrastructure improvements in economic growth areas, where evidence suggests investment in transport infrastructure will enable transformational economic growth. TfN have also stated that these Corridors will prioritise and sequence transport projects that will transform economic growth, promote cost-effectiveness of all modes of transport, explore digital technologies, explore a more efficient use of existing networks and provide capacity to meet the future economic demand, and protect the environment.

Investment Programme

TfN's Investment Programme states that it is seeking to increase investment in strategic transport investment over and above the level. TfN's current estimate of interventions it is promoting could cost between £60 – 70 billion over the next 30 years. This would consist of additional capital expenditure, over and above the existing investment, of £21–27 billion over the next 30 years (£700 – £900 million per year / £150 per person per year).

== See also ==
- Northern Powerhouse
