= William Rees Jeffreys =

British cyclist and activist (1871–1954)

- Born: William Rees Jeffreys; 1 December 1871; Paddington, London, England
- Died: 18 August 1954 (aged 82); Wivelsfield, Sussex, England
- Occupation: Transport campaigner
- Website: Rees Jeffreys Road Fund

William Rees Jeffreys (1 December 1871 – 18 August 1954) was a British cyclist and early campaigner for road improvements who became a key figure in the early 20th-century development of the UK highway system. As honorary secretary and later chairman of the Roads Improvement Association and the first secretary of the Road Board (which in 1919 became part of the Ministry of Transport), he was an early advocate of a ring road around London, and helped instigate the British road numbering system. In 1937 Jeffreys was described by former UK Prime Minister David Lloyd George as "the greatest authority on roads in the United Kingdom and one of the greatest in the whole world."

A charity he founded in 1950, the Rees Jeffreys Road Fund, continues to support UK transport-related projects.

== Early life ==
William Rees Jeffreys was born at 7 Warwick Place in Paddington, London, on 1 December 1871, the eldest of four children born to William George Jeffreys, an upholsterer, and his wife, Mary Ann, née Garratt. He was privately educated, and in 1891 joined the Board of Trade's commercial, labour, and statistical department as a second division clerk; in his late 20s he studied statistics under Arthur Lyon Bowley at the London School of Economics.

In his spare time, Jeffreys was a keen cyclist. Aged 18, he toured Scotland, and returned as member of the council of the Cyclists' Touring Club to gather information to issue as CTC guidance. He also explored Ireland, where he met Richard J. Mecredy, who helped form the Irish Roads Improvement Association.

== Career ==
=== Cycling advocacy ===
Jeffreys was elected to the council of the Cyclists' Touring Club in 1900, and chaired its rights and privileges committee from 1901 to 1906. In 1901 he became the CTC's representative at the Roads Improvement Association, and later the same year became its honorary secretary. The RIA had been jointly established by the CTC and the National Cyclists' Union in October 1886, and initially focused on production of technical literature distributed to highways boards and surveyors to promote improved construction and maintenance methods. Jeffreys believed the RIA should focus more on political lobbying and push for a national highway authority and state funding of highways. In 1903, he was the first witness to give evidence to a British government inquiry into highway administration, and provided extensive RIA technical information on road surfaces sourced from cyclists, saying "The bicycle is perhaps the best road inspector there is." He told the CTC Gazette: "To no class in the community are good roads so important as to cyclists."

=== Highways advocacy ===
As many cyclists also became motorists, Jeffreys's allegiances and the balance of the debate began to shift; he "became an arch motorist and the RIA morphed into a motoring organisation". In 1903 Jeffreys left the Board of Trade after being appointed administrative secretary of the Automobile Club of Great Britain (later the RAC) and secretary of the Motor Union of Great Britain and Ireland (established by the Automobile Club two years earlier; it amalgamated with the Automobile Association in 1910). In 1904, he wrote the preface for the Automobile Club's first Automobile Handbook.

Proposals submitted by William Rees Jeffreys in 1904 to the Royal Commission on London Traffic

In 1903, a Royal Commission on London Traffic was established to report on London's traffic and measures to be taken to improve flows. People were invited to submit proposals and Rees Jeffreys was one of many to do so. He proposed twelve road schemes, of which number 12 was the most eye-catching: a "boulevard round London" (see map). This was perhaps the first published proposal for what was implemented in the 1920s and 1930s as the North and South Circular Roads. In practice it was more a concept than a realistic proposal: whereas other schemes which involved large-scale demolition were marked as "involving clearances", it was not, despite passing through Hornsey, Tottenham and Walthamstow. (Note: The problems of improving the roads in these areas proved insuperable and led the London Traffic Branch of the Board of Trade to report in 1911 that it had had to move the route of the North Circular Road two miles north to avoid them; see https://en.wikipedia.org/wiki/North_Circular_Road#Early_history)

Rees Jeffreys advocated that the new roads to be built should, where possible, have four separate tracks for different classes of user:

- electric trams;
- automobiles and cycles;
- vans, carts, traction engines, and other slow-going traffic;
- foot passengers.

The Royal Commission proposed similar schemes of segregation in its report, distinguishing between slow and fast vehicular traffic, with rapid transit (i.e. limited stop) tramway cars in the middle of the roadway.

Jeffreys also had roles with the Commercial Motor Users' Association and the Institution of Automobile Engineers (he was honorary treasurer from 1910 to 1933; the IAE merged into the Institution of Mechanical Engineers in 1947), (Note: The IAE also had cycling origins. It was founded as the Cycle Engineers' Institute in Birmingham in 1898, becoming the Automobile and Cycle Engineers' Institute in 1904 before dropping the cycling reference in 1906 to become the Incorporated Institution of Automobile Engineers, and finally the Institution of Automobile Engineers (1911–1947).) founded the Motor Union Insurance Co Ltd (he was a director for 23 years), and he became a life member of the RAC. In 1908, he was also appointed secretary of the British Section of the Permanent International Association of Road Congresses (PIARC), a role which he later said "enabled gaps in my own knowledge to be filled from first hand information given by men who held positions of authority."

==== Secretary of the Road Board ====
In 1909 when the Road Board was established to administer funds raised by David Lloyd George's new taxes on motor vehicles, (Note: The Development and Roads Improvement Funds Act 1909 (9 Edw. 7. c. 47) created the Road Board, whose role was to subsidise new road construction projects, to improve existing roads, and to put in place measures to suppress road dust.) Jeffreys resigned from the CTC's Council and as honorary secretary of the RIA to become the board's first secretary – though he continued to recognise the pioneering role of cyclists (in his 1949 book, The King's Highway, he noted: "Cyclists were the class first to take a national interest in the conditions of the roads."). During its 10-year existence, the Road Board did little to improve the national road system, disbursing its funds mainly for the reconstruction and improvement of road surfaces with small amounts on minor alignment improvements and even less on new roads (exceptions included early work on the A4 in West London, the Croydon bypass, and development of the Fosse Way in Leicestershire). A factor in this inactivity was the appointment of a board chairman, George Gibb, who was more interested in rail transport. While Jeffreys blamed Treasury, landowners and railway opposition, a civil service inquiry found the board was badly administered and had insufficient technical expertise. Wartime restrictions from 1914 were also a critical factor. Jeffreys recalled that, of the £23.5 million collected from motorists only £14.5 million was spent on roads of which 83% was on road surfacing.

In 1912 Jeffreys travelled to the US to study its approach to highway development, attending a 5 June dinner of the American Road Builders Association, and being described in Senate discussions about taxation and centralised funding of road construction as "a man who has done more than anyone else to build up the system that now exists in England." (Note: In 1929, Jeffreys was appointed as the American Road Builders Association's honorary representative in Britain.)

As the Road Board needed to work out which roads should be funded, upgraded or replaced, in 1913 Jeffreys appointed Henry Maybury, one of the board's senior engineers, to devise a classification system and then assign numbers to the highways for identification purposes. The road numbering scheme eventually divided the British mainland into nine zones, six radiating from London. In 1913 and 1914, the Road Board also organised London Arterial Road Conferences in 1913–14 that carried forward work by the London Traffic Branch of the Board of Trade which in its 1910 and 1911 Reports had set out plans for arterial roads in the London area. Jeffreys returned to the theme of planning arterial roads in a paper presented to the Town Planning Institute in April 1917.

Jeffreys served on two departmental committees: the Treasury Committee on Motor Car Licence Duties (1916), and the Departmental Committee on Taxation and Regulation of Road Vehicles (1920–1923). In 1919, after World War I, the ineffective Road Board was disbanded and replaced by a new Ministry of Transport. (Note: The Ministry of Transport Act 1919 (10 Geo. 5 c.50) created the Ministry of Transport and abolished the Road Board; under the 1920 Roads Act, the Road Improvement Fund's assets were transferred to a 'Road Fund'.) By this point, in 1918, Jeffreys had resigned as the board's secretary in order to campaign for better roads as a free agent and chairman of the RIA.

==== Roads champion ====
In 1928, Chancellor of the Exchequer Winston Churchill told Parliament that English roads were the best in the world. Jeffreys said Churchill was spouting "political dope": English roads were narrow, ill-designed and abounding with hidden corners and blind turns and were the most congested and overcrowded in the world. He said £100 million should be immediately spent on building new roads. In 1929 a total of 6,016 people were killed on UK roads; despite the increase in vehicular traffic since then, the number killed in 2013 was 1,713 people. Jeffreys and the RIA continued to campaign for "new roads, safe roads, beautiful roads", inspiring the 1928 establishment of the Roads Beautifying Association (RBA), a group of horticultural experts who would provide free advice to councils on the planting alongside trunk roads, by-passes and road-widening schemes.

In the late 1920s, Jeffreys—described as "the recently retired chairman of the London-based Roads Improvement Association"—visited Africa, spending 14 weeks on the continent, driving 3,000 miles in South Africa. He then sailed from Durban to Mombasa and travelled by train, river steamer, and hire-car before joining a four-car convoy for a 618-mile drive from Jinja to Rejaf to connect with a steamer on the River Nile. In 1933, he visited Australia and was recorded as the chairman of the RIA in a report of a Victoria League lunch in Sydney. In 1934, he visited Germany and, with officials from the Ministry of Transport and Fritz Todt, inspected highways from the airship Graf Zeppelin during the 1934 International Road Congress.

Back in the UK, in 1936 Jeffreys again complained:

The Government has used the BBC night after night to convey that the appalling number for road accidents is due to careless and negligent drivers. This false suggestion is made by the Government to cover up its own shortcomings. The British motor-driver is the most cautious, considerate and law-abiding of any drivers in the world. The principle [sic] reason for the enormous number of accidents is our inadequate road system.

In 1937 David Lloyd George described Jeffreys as "the greatest authority on roads in the United Kingdom and one of the greatest in the whole world."

In March 1942, Jeffreys wrote to the journal Roads and Road Construction, lamenting the British government's neglect of the Empire's roads, and its failure to recognise ‘the importance of roads for defence as well as for development’. Jeffreys wanted a British organisation similar to Germany's Gesellschaft Reichsautobahnen (Reichsautobahn Association). The journal titled his letter 'Roads of empire. Wanted – a British "Todt" organisation'.

In 1944 he wrote a letter to The Times advocating the establishment of 'Roadside Parks' (now called 'roadside rests'). He said "Roadside Parks should be situated on the outskirts of towns and in the countryside at viewpoints and restful places. They would be available for children, hikers, cyclists and motorists to rest, play and take picnic meals. They should be laid out and tended so they can be enjoyed by all who pass by." He also thought that the parks would become obstacles to prevent ribbon development, and offered ten sums of £100 for the establishment of ten parks and hoped that one would be in West and another in East Sussex.

== Death and legacy ==
Jeffreys died on 18 August 1954 in his Sussex home at Wivelsfield Hall in Wivelsfield Green, and is buried in Wivelsfield's churchyard. He had been an art collector and after his death, 158 works—bronzes, lithographs, drawings and paintings (including works by Boudin, Corot, Degas, Augustus John, Matisse, Picasso and Sickert, some of which he purchased from the artists themselves)—were auctioned at Christie's. Some were bought by the Tate Gallery with the money going towards a charity that Jeffreys had founded in 1950.

Several of Jeffreys's ideas were implemented after his death, including motorways ("special roads restricted to motor traffic alone with no stopping permitted and no pipes or cables laid beneath them"), the Severn Bridge between England and Wales (1966), and the orbital London by-pass (the M25 motorway, completed in 1986).

=== Rees Jeffreys Road Fund ===
His estate provided an endowment enabling the Rees Jeffreys Road Fund to offer financial support for education, research and physical road transport–related projects. The registered charity's main activities are in three areas: provision of support for academic posts and studentships; contributions to physical projects on land adjoining highways; and support for highway-related research projects.

Imperial College's Transport Library (next to the Letitia Chitty Reading Room) is sponsored by the Rees Jeffreys fund. The fund also sponsors MSc Transport students.

In 2016, a Rees Jeffreys Road Fund report, A Major Road Network for England, recommended creation of England's Major Road Network, implemented in 2018.

In 2018, the Rees Jeffreys Road Fund, with the Campaign for Better Transport, published a guide, Roads and the Environment: Putting an innovative approach at the heart of RIS2.

In September 2021, the Rees Jeffreys Road Fund launched a £150,000 'future roads' competition to mark the 150th anniversary of Jeffreys's birth. Trustees asked entrants to consider their vision of how roads (motorways, highways, streets and footways) could best work for everybody for the next 50 years. In March 2022, two winners of the competition were announced; the Eloy connected vehicle platform and Reed Mobility's automated vehicle system each won £75,000 to support delivery of their ideas.

=== Roadside rests ===
In providing several memorial viewpoints across the country, the charity remembered its founder's request for Sussex. A viewpoint (created in 1968) is provided at Duncton Down on the A285 at Petworth, overlooking the playing fields of Seaford College. In East Sussex, a viewing platform was erected at High and Over giving views over the Cuckmere Valley. Other locations include (by date order where known):

- A217 Reigate Hill, Surrey (created in 1958)
- Old Winchester Hill off the A32 in Hayden Lane (1958)
- B2042 Ide Hill, Kent (1960)
- Stanmore Common (1972)
- B2139 West of Houghton, West Sussex (1991)
- A809 Queen's View and The Whangie carpark, Auchineden Hill, near Carbeth, Scotland
- Newgale, Pembrokeshire overlooking St Brides Bay and Newgale Beach
- Rhaedr y Cwm near Llan Ffestiniog in Gwynedd
- A47 The fort car park in Lower Fishguard Harbour
- Little Mis Tor, Dartmoor (west of Merrivale on the Two Bridges-Tavistock road)
- St Mary's Vale, near Abergavenny, Gwent
- Blackgang, Isle of Wight

=== Other memorials ===
Since 1998, the Institution of Civil Engineers has presented the Rees Jeffreys Award for the best paper on highway engineering published by the institution, with author(s) receiving a premium of £200 and a certificate.

== Notes and references ==
- Baldwin, Peter; Bridle, Ron; Baldwin, Robert; Porter, Ron (2002). The Motorway Achievement, Volume 1. London: Thomas Telford. ISBN 9780727731968.
- Reid, Carlton (2014). Roads Were Not Built For Cars. Newcastle: Red Kite Prayer/Front Page Creations. ISBN 9780993005701.
