= George Gibb (transport administrator) =

British railway and road Board administrator

Sir George Gibb
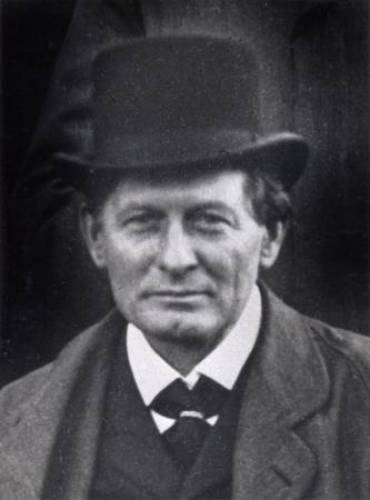
- Sir George Gibb, circa 1910
- Born: 30 April 1850; Aberdeen, Scotland
- Died: 17 December 1925 (aged 75); Wimbledon. Surrey
- Occupation: Transport administrator
- Relatives: Sir Alexander Gibb (nephew)

Sir George Stegmann Gibb (30 April 1850 – 17 December 1925) was a British transport administrator who served as the general manager of the North Eastern Railway, managing director of the Underground Electric Railways Company of London, and as chairman of the former British Road Board.

== Early life ==
George Gibb was born in Aberdeen, the son of engineer Alexander Gibb (1804–1867) and the former Margaret Smith and grandson of civil engineer John Gibb (1776–1850). Gibb attended Aberdeen Grammar School and the University of Aberdeen before taking a law degree at the University of London. After spending time working in shipping and marine insurance, he was articled to a solicitor in 1872. He worked in the solicitor's office of the Great Western Railway for three years from 1877 to 1880 before setting up his own practice in London. In 1881, he married Dorothea Garrett Smith. The couple had four sons and one daughter.

== Transport administrator ==
In 1882, Gibb joined the North Eastern Railway (NER) as a solicitor and was soon acting as assistant to general manager Henry Tennant. In 1891, he succeeded Tennant as general manager, taking charge at a difficult time for the railway industry. The railway companies were facing twin pressures from parliament passing legislation to control transport rates and working hours and from expanding trade unions.

Gibb improved the running of the NER by introducing new management methods and recruiting able apprentice managers directly from universities and business. Among those he recruited were future transport industry leaders Ralph Wedgwood, Eric Geddes and Frank Pick. At the start of the 20th century he visited the United States to study American transport management methods and restructured the NER's organisation. He established a statistics office to collect data on all of the company's operations. The greatly increased efficiencies that this provided enabled the company to improve its income and led to its methods being copied by many other railway companies. Gibb was also innovative in his dealings with the unions; introducing collective bargaining into his negotiations and using independent arbitration to settle disputes.

In 1906, he became managing director and deputy chairman of the Underground Electric Railways Company of London (UERL), holding company of four underground lines in the capital. The UERL was struggling under a heavy burden of debt incurred to construct three of the lines and electrify the fourth. (Note: The Bakerloo Tube and Piccadilly Tube opened in 1906 and the Hampstead Tube opened in 1907. Electrification of the District Railway was completed in 1905.) With income significantly lower than expected, the UERL was close to bankruptcy. (Note: In the Bakerloo Tube's first twelve months of operation it carried 20.5 million passengers, less than sixty per cent of the 35 million predicted. The Piccadilly Tube achieved 26 million of a predicted 60 million and the Hampstead Tube managed 25 million of a predicted 50 million. For the District Railway, the UERL had predicted an increase to 100 million passengers after electrification, but achieved 55 million. The lower than expected passenger numbers were partly due to competition between the UERL's lines and those of the other tube and sub-surface railway companies, and the spread of electric trams and motor buses, replacing slower, horse-drawn road transport, took a large number of passengers away from the trains.) Working under chairman Edgar Speyer and recruiting future chairman Albert Stanley from America as general manager, Gibb helped reorganise the group of companies and stave off bankruptcy. (Note: Gibb also brought Frank Pick with him from the NER.)

In 1910, Gibb retired from the UERL to become chairman of the government's new Road Board, tasked with improving Britain's road system. The appointment of a railway specialist as chairman was controversial, Gibb clashed repeatedly with Board secretary William Rees Jeffreys and was criticised for allocating 90 per cent of the Road Board's funds to the improvement of existing roads rather than the construction of new arterial roads, a move seen as delaying competition for the railways, although the delay was to allow research into road building methods. The Road Board was abolished in 1919 when the Ministry of Transport was created. (Note: The first Minister of Transport was Gibb's former recruit at the NER, Eric Campbell Geddes.)

Between 1919 and 1922 he acted as a consultant to the NER, advising the company on the coming amalgamation of Britain's railways under the Grouping Act.

Gibb died at his home in Wimbledon.

== Other activities ==
In 1901, Gibb served on the committee that considered the reorganisation of the War Office and was a member of the Royal Commission on London Traffic from 1903 to 1905. For the latter service he was granted a knighthood in 1904. During the First World War, he served on the Army council and was a member of the Government Arbitration Board Committee on Production from 1915 to 1918.

At the end of his life he was briefly chairman of the Oriental Telephone Company.

== Notes and references ==
=== Bibliography ===
- Elliot, John; Robbins, Michael (October 2008). "Pick, Frank (1878–1941)". Oxford Dictionary of National Biography (online ed.). Oxford University Press. doi:10.1093/ref:odnb/35522. (Subscription, Wikipedia Library access or UK public library membership required.)
- Irving, R. J. (2008). "Gibb, Sir George Stegmann (1850-1925)". Oxford Dictionary of National Biography (online ed.). Oxford University Press. doi:10.1093/ref:odnb/45711. (Subscription, Wikipedia Library access or UK public library membership required.)
- Rose, Douglas (1999) [1980]. The London Underground, A Diagrammatic History. Douglas Rose/Capital Transport. ISBN 1-85414-219-4.
- Wolmar, Christian (2005) [2004]. The Subterranean Railway: How the London Underground Was Built and How It Changed the City Forever. Atlantic Books. ISBN 1-84354-023-1.
- "Gibb, Sir George Stegmann". Who Was Who. Oxford University Press/A & C Black. 2007.
