= Pedals (Nottingham) =

Pedals - the Nottingham Cycling Campaign
- Formation: 1979
- Location: Nottingham, UK
- Region served: Nottingham Urban Area
- Website: Pedals

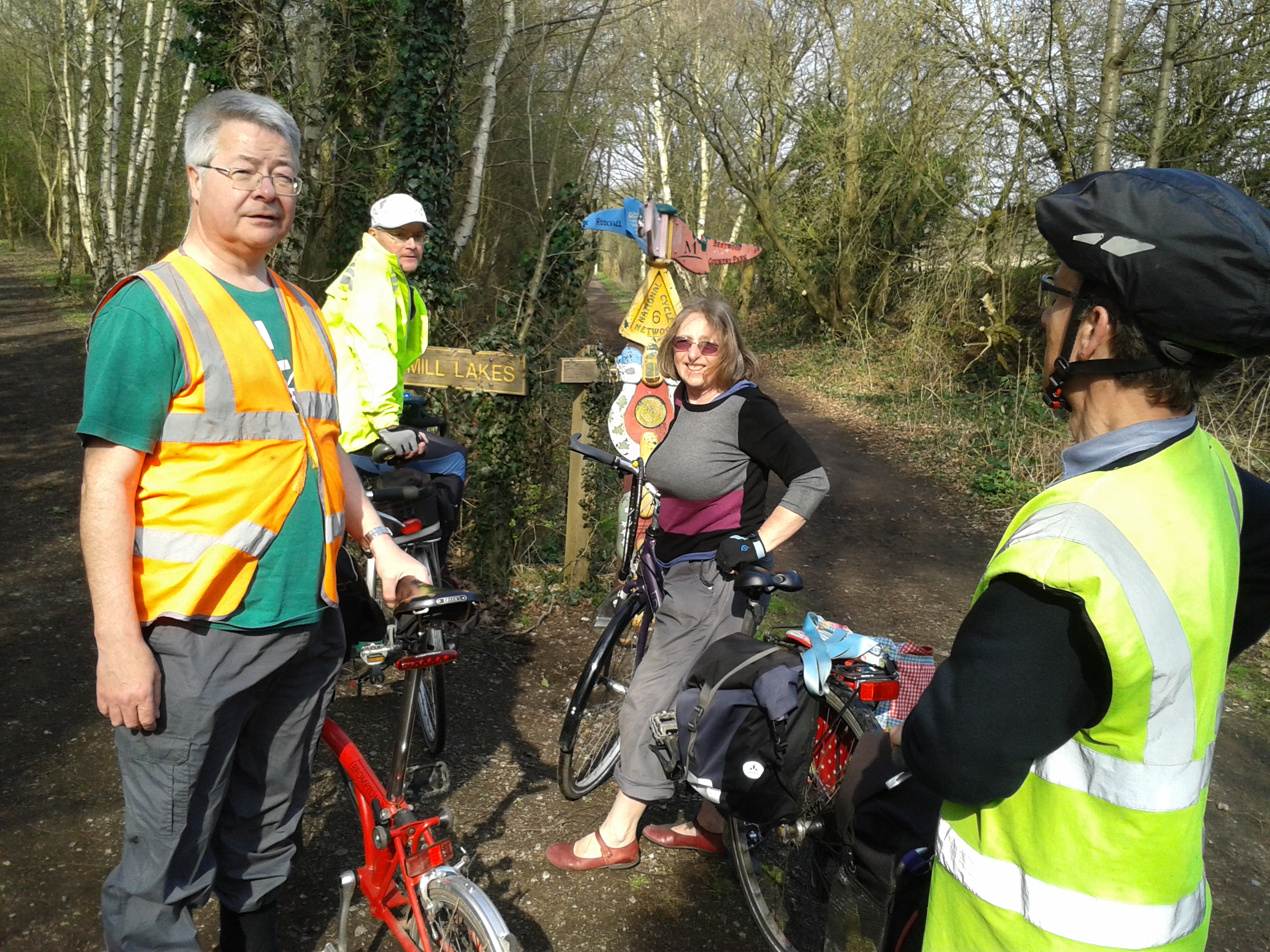
Pedals members on a guided ride along Route 6 of the National Cycle Network

Pedals is a voluntary organisation founded in 1979 to encourage more people to use bicycles and to campaign for safer and more attractive conditions for cyclists in the Nottingham area. Pedals campaigned to get Nottingham one of the country's largest network of urban cycle routes in the 1980s. It continues to press for many more facilities, especially in and across the City Centre and the north side of Nottingham, as well as linking better to nearby countryside.

== Strategic Vision ==
The group describes its strategy as follows: "Pedals wishes to see support for cycling in 3 ways:
- Promotion of cycling as a healthy and sustainable means of transport including:-
- Improvement of existing infrastructure to make cycling safer
- Expansion of specific facilities for cyclists"

== Campaigns ==
Pedals actively engaged with Nottingham Express Transit (NET) during the developments of phase one and two to push for better provision for cyclists, including cycle racks at tram stops, carriage of cycle on off-peak trams, tram groove inserts for on street sections to prevent cycle accidents and alternative cycle routes away from tram tracks. A publicity campaign highlighting the dangers of trams tracks to cyclists was launched by the contractor. Pedals has successfully campaigned to get hundreds of cycle stands installed locally and also cycle lockers at several locations.

== Engagement with other organisations ==
Pedals represents cyclists as an informal stakeholder group at various committees, these include:
Broxtowe Borough Council Transport Sub Group
Nottingham City Council Cycling Development Group
Nottingham City Council Local Access Forum
East Midlands Trains Stakeholders Forum

Pedals operates as a stakeholder group representing cyclists in the Greater Nottingham area, as such it regularly scrutinises and comments on planning applications, highway changes and new policies.

Pedals members also attend one off meetings to discuss plans for new infrastructure which will benefit or impact on cyclists. These have included:
Widening of the A453 Trunk Road, which will include a cycle path
Erewash Valley Trail, a circular walking and Cycling trail from Trent Lock to Langley Mill
Nottingham Express Transit Phase 2
HS2 cycleway, a proposed North south cycle route which will run parallel to the proposed HS2 rail way line
Many Pedals members are also cycling instructors for Ridewise or are volunteer rangers as part of the Sustrans Nottingham rangers group who help to maintain Route 6 and Route 15 of the National Cycle Network which pass through Nottingham.

Pedals is affiliated with Cycle Nation and the European Cyclists' Federation. Pedals activists communicate regularly on campaigning issues with national organisations such as Twenty is Plenty and the Cyclists' Touring Club. Pedals periodically host the annual meeting of the East Midlands Cycling Forum, which aims to bring together cycle campaign groups in the region.

== Finance ==
Pedals is a voluntary organisation, the majority of its modest operating costs are covered by members subscriptions. Members receive minutes of meetings and newsletters.

== History ==
Pedals started the Great Nottinghamshire Bike Ride in 1982, run by Nottinghamshire County Council from 1985 to 2010 and from 2011 to be run by the Perfect Motion Sports Management Consultancy in Beeston. In 1983 Pedals started the 'Summer Guided Rural Rides Programme', and continued to play a major role in these free Cycle Rides (subsequently called "Rural Rides"), funded and run by the County Council from 1985 to 2010 and from 2011-2013 by Ridewise, supported by Pedals.

== Rural Rides and Nottingham Velo Venturers ==
Public participation in the Rural Rides programme declined from 2011-2013 and Ridewise dropped the name 'Rural Rides' in 2013, renaming their Facebook rides page "Explore Nottingham", which currently offers a limited programme of short rides aimed at non-cyclists.

In 2014 a group of Pedals members and other Cyclists decided to revive the Rural Rides ethos (a varied programme of free guided cycle rides) under the name of Nottingham Velo Venturers, which has several rides a month (more in Summer). Nottingham Velo Venturers operates solely via its (very active) Facebook page, and so is independent of the funding issues that caused the demise of the original Rural Rides Programme.

== Honours ==
The work of Hugh McClintock as a leading figure in Pedals was acknowledged in the 2004 New Year Honours List with an MBE "for services to cycling".

== See also ==
- Bicycle touring
- Challenge riding
- CTC (cycling)
- Cycling
- Greenway (landscape)
- List of cycleways
- Mountain biking
- National Cycle Network
- Permeability (spatial and transport planning)
- Rail trail
- Segregated cycle facilities
- Utility cycling
