= Roads Improvement Association =

British organisation

The Roads Improvement Association, established in 1882, was a British civic organisation which campaigned for better roads in the late 19th century and first half of the 20th century. Founded by cycling organisations about ten years before the first modern motor cars arrived on the roads, it became a predominantly motoring body before World War I.

== History ==
=== Cycling origins ===
The Roads Improvement Association (RIA) was jointly established in October 1886 by the Cyclists' Touring Club and the National Cyclists' Union, both of which had been founded in 1878.

The NCU was originally the Bicycle Union, instigated by Gerard Francis Cobb, a Cambridge University music tutor and president of the university's bicycle club, and also later a member of the CTC's national council. In July 1878, Cobb led the Bicycle Union's lobbying of the Local Government Board, one of the official bodies managing British highways, and also actively campaigned for highway improvements in Cambridge. The Bicycle Union was renamed the National Cyclists' Union in 1883, and continued to campaign for highway improvements, successfully pursuing an 1885 legal action, with support from highway engineer Thomas Codrington, regarding the road between Birmingham and Halesowen. In October 1886, the CTC and NCU pooled resources and formed the Roads Improvement Association.

As transport expert Christian Wolmar has observed:

it was cyclists that, quite literally, paved the way for the car as they were the earliest campaigners for macadamised roads as they wanted a smooth surface for their country rides. Their organisation, the Roads Improvement Association, even sued, at the end of the 19th century, local authority highway engineers for failing to provide them.

The RIA initially focused on production of technical literature distributed to highways boards and surveyors to promote improved highway construction and maintenance methods. By 1890, the RIA had reported on 33 roads, some of which had been improved, but by 1893 the Association was described as "moribund" with no further legal successes and no nationwide movement for better roads. According to T. R. Nicolson: "It took on new life only after the coming of the motor car".

This change began at the start of the 20th century. In 1900, William Rees Jeffreys was elected to the council of the Cyclists' Touring Club. In 1901, he became the CTC's RIA representative, and later the same year became its honorary secretary. Jeffreys believed the RIA should focus more on political lobbying and push for a national highway authority and state funding of highways. In 1903, he was the first witness to give evidence to a British government inquiry into highway administration, and provided extensive RIA technical information on road surfaces sourced from cyclists, saying "The bicycle is perhaps the best road inspector there is." He told the CTC Gazette: "To no class in the community are good roads so important as to cyclists."

=== Highways advocacy ===
As many cyclists also became motorists, the balance of the debate shifted. The RIA's 1901 AGM was held at the offices of the CTC, which also owned the RIA's furniture, and RIA council meetings comprised five representatives from each of the CTC and NCU and two or three from the Automobile Club of Great Britain. In 1903 Jeffreys became administrative secretary of the Automobile Club and secretary of the Motor Union of Great Britain and Ireland, which shared offices in London's Albemarle Street with the RIA. Jeffreys "became an arch motorist and the RIA morphed into a motoring organisation".

The RIA's published guidance on road improvements included A bibliography of road making and maintenance in Great Britain, a pamphlet costing 6d, compiled by Sidney and Beatrice Webb. This described the aims of the RIA:

The Roads Improvement Association is an organisation established to secure for the public better, wider, and more numerous roads and footways. With this object in view it has initiated a movement to secure those legislative and administrative alterations which economic changes, especially the development of new and improved methods of road locomotion, have rendered necessary.

In 1909 when the British government's Road Board (a forerunner of today's Department for Transport) was established, Jeffreys resigned as honorary secretary of the RIA to become the Board's first secretary, though he continued to recognise the pioneering role of cyclists. (In his 1949 book, The King's Highway, he noted: "Cyclists were the class first to take a national interest in the conditions of the roads."). The Road Board was established to administer Vehicle Excise Duty – money raised by taxation to pay for new road construction and for repair of damage done to existing roads by the growing number of motorists.

Jeffreys later became chairman of the RIA, which continued to campaign for "new roads, safe roads, beautiful roads", inspiring the 1928 establishment of the Roads Beautifying Association (RBA), a group of horticultural experts who would provide free advice to councils on the planting alongside trunk roads, by-passes and road-widening schemes.

The CTC remained part of the RIA until 1933 even though it was recognised that it was mainly interested in provision for motorists. In 1946, the RIA gave evidence reported in the Ministry of War Transport's report Design and Layout of Roads in Built-up Areas.

== Other roads improvement associations ==
In the US, the League of American Wheelmen formed a National Committee for Road Improvement in 1888, which became the nucleus of the US 'Good Roads' movement. In 1891, the League created the Roads Improvement Bureau, which published pamphlets and articles in magazines and newspapers. As in the UK, US cycling organisations formed a coalition with other bodies to promote the benefits of better roads, and an American Association for Highway Improvement was founded at a Good Roads convention in St Louis, Missouri in 1901.

Modelled on the British organisation, the Irish Roads Improvement Association was established in April 1897 by, among others, Richard J. Mecredy.

== See also ==
- Campaign for Better Transport (United Kingdom)
