= Sub-national transport body =

A sub-national transport body (STBs) is a type of ad hoc statutory transport governance organisation in England. They are intended to provide strategic transport governance at a much larger scale than existing local transport authorities, by grouping councils together.

In 2016 the Local Transport Act 2008 was amended by the Cities and Local Government Devolution Act 2016 to allow the creation of sub-national transport bodies in England outside of Greater London. The first such body created was Transport for the North. Typically a sub-national transport body exists in a shadow form before being put on a statutory footing by secondary legislation. Sub-national transport bodies produce transport strategies for their areas.

Current sub-national transport bodies outside of Greater London are:

- England's Economic Heartland (pre-statutory basis)
- Midlands Connect (pre-statutory basis). The first strategic transport plan was created in 2017, and updated in 2022.
- Transport East (pre-statutory basis). Released their transport strategy in February 2023.
- Transport for the North (statutory basis since 1 April 2018). Their second strategic transport plan was released in March 2024, following consultation in 2023.
- Transport for the South East (pre-statutory basis, formal application submitted)
- Western Gateway (pre-statutory basis)
- Peninsula Transport (pre-statutory basis) - Cornwall, Devon, Plymouth, Somerset and Torbay

Additionally there have been proposals for sub-national transport bodies covering West Anglia and the South West.
