= International Cycling Association =

The International Cycling Association (ICA) was the first international body for cycle racing. Founded by Henry Sturmey in 1892 to establish a common definition of amateurism and to organise world championships its role was taken over by the Union Cycliste Internationale (UCI) in 1900.

== Background ==
The ethos at the end of the 19th century and the increasing influence of the Olympic Games made amateurism an issue in many sports. It was especially relevant in cycle racing because riders had begun travelling internationally to compete in track, or velodrome, races. Riders from one country would complain that they were at a disadvantage to those from another, that they were riding against what they considered to be professionals.

The world's dominant cycling association was the National Cyclists' Union (NCU) in Britain. The historian Jim McGurn said:

"The National Cyclists' Union [known until 1883 as the Bicycle Union], made itself unpopular in the early 1890s for its stubborn and seemingly nit-picking opposition to riders who professed themselves 'amateur'".

"The national organisations which governed cycle sport were often in dispute, largely as a result of their varying attitudes to the spread of professionalism. The Bicycle Union, having quarrelled with the Amateur Athletics Association over cycle race jurisdiction on AAA premises, took issue with the Union Vélocipèdique de France over the French body's willingness to allow its 'amateurs' to compete for prizes of up to 2,000 francs, the equivalent of about 16 months' pay for a French manual worker. The Bicycle Union often refused to recognise the amateur licences of visiting UVF [Union vélocipédique de France] competitors, and eventually broke off relations on the grounds that the UVF allowed mixed amateur-professional events."

The NCU's championships were considered the unofficial championships of the world. It was because the sport needed world championships independent of any national body that Henry Sturmey of the magazine The Cyclist and later founder of the Sturmey-Archer gear company proposed an International Cyclists Association in 1892. Having secured the co-operation of British officials and writers such as George Lacy Hillier, he approached other countries' national associations through the NCU.

They met in the Royal Agricultural Hall, London in November 1892, listed as representing the NCU (Henry Sturmey and W. M. Appleton), the Union des Sociétés Françaises de Sports Athlétiques (A. E. Kemplen), German Cyclists Union (Heinrich Kleyer), Dutch Cyclists Union (Franz Netcher), Italian Cyclists Union (G. Bonetti), Belgian Cyclists Union (A. Choisy), Canadian Cyclists Association (Dr P. E. Doolittle).

Trouble was already in store because the Union des Sociétés Françaises de Sports Athlétiques was not the French national body. The national body, the Union Vélocipèdique Française, sent observers but was not allowed to take part because the NCU had broken off relationships with it over the question of amateurism. Scottish Cyclist reported:

"Already some difficulties have presented themselves. France and its freedom have long been a bugbear to those countries which possess a stringent amateur definition. From their point of view nearly all French riders are professionals, and the Union Vélocipèdique de France a professional organisation. Some time ago, the UVF having failed to establish an amateur class, a cycling section of a large athletic club run on amateur principles was recognised by the NCU as the amateur governing body. But it no more represents French cyclists than, say, the Edinburgh University CC does Scottish cyclists."

The meeting agreed that any country could belong to the ICA "providing they enforce a strict amateur rule", resolved to hold a world championship on the track at one mile, 10 km and, with pacers, 100 km. "If possible," the meeting resolved, "a team race of teams of not more than four, at a distance of 10km."

== The Zimmerman problem ==
The case for a common definition of amateurism was accentuated by the case of the American, Arthur Augustus Zimmerman. Zimmerman was an amateur. By the definition proposed by the ICA, that meant:

"One who has never engaged in, nor assisted in, nor taught any athletic exercise for money, nor knowingly competed with or against a professional for a prize of any description... Or who is recognised as an amateur by the ruling body of his country."

Zimmerman was "recognised as an amateur by the ruling body of his country", the League of American Wheelmen. The New York Times listed his winnings in 1892 as including 29 bicycles, several horses and carriages, half a dozen pianos, a house, land, furniture and "enough silver plates, medals and jewellery to stock a jewellery store." That summer he took the British mile, five-mile, 25-mile and 50-mile championships, all on the track. Next year he came back with two Raleigh bikes, his name in Raleigh advertising, and - the NCU suspected - Raleigh money in his wallet as well.

The NCU banned Zimmerman from Britain. But a further weakness in the ICA appeared when the League of American Wheelmen and the associations of other countries took no notice: there was no insistence in the rules that all member countries had to recognise the decisions of others.

== The world championships ==
The first world championships were held in Chicago, the winners receiving a gold medal and all participants a silver medal. The distance from the centre of world cycling in Europe limited the number of riders and Americans won two of the three gold medals. The tables below show what would have happened had gold, bronze and silver medals been awarded to the first three.

Rank	Nation	Gold	Silver	Bronze	Total
1	United States	2	3	2	7
2	Transvaal	1	0	0	1
Totals (2 entries)		3	3	2	8

Event	Gold	Silver	Bronze
Sprint	Arthur Zimmerman; United States	John S. Johnson; United States	John Patrick Bliss; United States
Stayers	Lawrence Meintjes; Transvaal	Ernst Emil Ulbricht; United States	
10 km Sprint	Arthur Zimmerman; United States	John Patrick Bliss; United States	John S. Johnson; United States

The following championships were run in Antwerp, Cologne, Copenhagen, Glasgow, Vienna and Montreal.

== The end of the ICA ==
"After a modest start in the early 1890s," said the British cycling official George Herbert Stancer, "[the ICA] achieved considerable success, eventually gaining the support of all the important sport-controlling bodies in the cycling world. But he went on:

"Then discord began to simmer in France, where objection was taken to Britain's alleged domination over international racing. This domination was more apparent than real, for the NCU exercised no control or influence over the independent governing bodies of Scotland, Ireland, Australia, South Africa and Canada. Wales, I think, was not represented. France, to put it plainly, wanted to rule the roost and the method adopted to achieve that end was not particularly creditable."

France's objection was that Britain had more than one vote and more than one team in championships. The NCU represented only England and the associations of the other individual nations that made up the United Kingdom were separately represented.

The sequence of world championships meant that France was due to promote them, in Paris, in 1900. France no longer wanted to tolerate the system in which several British teams competed and a proposal at an ICA meeting before the 1900 championships called for the UK to be limited to one. Stancer said no warning had been given and that representatives of Scotland, Ireland and three colonies included in the motion were not present. Sturmey succeeded in having the proposal postponed rather than have the countries "kicked out in their absence," as Stancer put it.

Before the fresh meeting was held, Stancer said, France convened a meeting in Paris and formed the Union Cycliste Internationale. Not only would it permit just one team from the United Kingdom but the NCU and Britain's other governing bodies were excluded because they had not been at the founding meeting. It took until 1903 for Britain to be admitted.
