= National Cyclists' Union =

Cyclist Union in Great Britain

The National Cyclists' Union (NCU) was an association established in the Guildhall Tavern, London, on 16 February 1878 as the Bicycle Union. Its purpose was to defend cyclists and to organise and regulate bicycle racing in Great Britain. It merged with the Tricycle Association in 1882 and was renamed the National Cyclists' Union in 1883.

The National Cyclists' Union selected teams for world championships and regulated circuit and track racing in England and Wales. It was a founder member of the International Cycling Association, forerunner of the Union Cycliste Internationale, the world governing body.

During and after the Second World War, the NCU became involved in a dispute with a rival body, the British League of Racing Cyclists, which defied the NCU's rules that massed-start races should be held on public roads only when they were closed to other traffic. The struggle between the two lasted for a decade, after which they merged to become the British Cycling Federation.

== Formation ==
The Bicycle Union was formally established at a meeting in the Guildhall Tavern, London, on 16 February 1878, instigated by Gerard Francis Cobb (a Cambridge University music tutor, president of the Cambridge University Cycling Club, and also a member of the Cyclists' Touring Club's national council). Its purpose was to defend cyclists and to organise and regulate bicycle racing in Great Britain. In July 1878, Cobb, as its first president, led the Bicycle Union's lobbying of the Local Government Board, one of the official bodies managing British highways, and also actively campaigned for highway improvements in Cambridge.

The Bicycle Union merged with the Tricycle Association in 1882 and was renamed the National Cyclists' Union in 1883. It continued to campaign for highway improvements, successfully pursuing an 1885 legal action, with support from highway engineer Thomas Codrington, regarding the road between Birmingham and Halesowen.

In October 1886, the CTC and NCU pooled resources and formed the Roads Improvement Association. This did not present itself as a cycling organisation, instead initially focusing on production of technical literature distributed to highways boards and surveyors to promote improved construction and maintenance methods. In the early years of the 20th century, however, the RIA gradually became primarily a motoring lobby organisation, under honorary secretary William Rees Jeffreys.

== Activities and amateurism ==
The British weekly, The Bicycle, said:

"Even during the insecurity of its early years, the union found that it had substantial problems to fight. Foremost among them was a proposed amendment to the Highways Act, then before Parliament, which threatened to check very seriously the use of bicycles on the road. The cyclist of those days was considered a nuisance whether he rode a bicycle, a tricycle, or a velocipede, and was banned by municipal bodies and corporations all over the country. Here was a matter affecting the very existence of cyclists. The Bicycle Union, then barely five months old, was called upon to act promptly. By instant and energetic action a rejection of the venomous amendment was secured."

The NCU erected road signs warning cyclists of steep descents and other hazards. It was prompted by a member, J. George Jnr, who suggested them in 1878. The idea was taken up by the Earl of Albemarle, who became president of the NCU. The NCU shared signposting with the Cyclists Touring Club but after 10 years could no longer afford it and the CTC took on the whole job. The NCU also produced publications to help cyclists tour Britain.

The NCU also ran racing championships, at first open to anyone in the world. Its championships were the world's most prestigious and considered unofficial championships of the world. The NCU, which had a strict definition of an amateur, proposed to create an International Cycling Association, open to national organisations whose views of amateurism were similar to its own, and to organise world championships. The International Cycling Union was the forerunner of the Union Cycliste Internationale.

The NCU defined amateurism in English races and banned the American sprinter, Arthur Augustus Zimmerman when he appeared to be sponsored by the Raleigh Bicycle Company. It insisted the organisers of the first Bordeaux-Paris met its own ideals before allowing British riders to take part. When George Pilkington Mills won, the NCU would not recognise the victory, or consider Mills still an amateur, until he proved he had no help from the cycle factory for which he worked.

== Amateurism and the International Cyclists Association ==
The NCU was a founder member of the world's first cycling authority, the International Cyclists Association. NCU championships, until 1937 open to riders from any country, had been considered the unofficial championships of the world. It was because the sport needed world championships independent of any national body that Henry Sturmey of the magazine The Cyclist and later founder of the Sturmey-Archer gear company proposed an International Cyclists Association in 1892. He approached other countries' cycling national associations through the NCU. The founding meeting was in London in November 1892, with representatives of the NCU and organisations in France, Germany, Holland, Italy and Canada.

Not all were the main bodies in their home country. The largest French organisation, the Union Vélocipèdique Française, sent observers but was not allowed to take part because the NCU had broken off relationships with it over the question of amateurism. Countries objected to having one vote when Britain, with England, Scotland and Ireland each voting, had three.

France was due to promote the world championships in Paris in 1900. It refused to accept the NCU's position and, after failing to have the issue discussed at an ICA meeting, convened a meeting in Paris to form the Union Cycliste Internationale. Not only would it permit just one team from the United Kingdom but the NCU and Britain's other governing bodies were excluded because they had not been at the founding meeting. It took until 1903 for Britain to be admitted.

== Road racing ==
The NCU banned all cycle racing on public roads in 1890, fearing it would again jeopardise the position of other cyclists. It compelled members to hold their races on velodromes, although the word was not known then, or on closed roads such as in parks and airfields. The only races allowed on public roads were time-trials, in which riders competed against the clock at intervals, and distance and place-to-place record attempts.

Such a ban did not operate in other countries and massed road racing continued as before. That made little difference to the British because the few international events to which they sent riders, notably the Olympic and world championship road races, had been run as individual time trials. It was as a 100-mile [162 km] time-trial, in Shropshire, that Britain organised the world championship road race in 1922. Then in 1933 the UCI decided that championships would be massed-start events. The NCU organised its 1933 world championship trial as a circuit race at Brooklands near Weybridge in Surrey. This and Donington Park in the north Midlands remained the sole venues for massed start racing on mainland Britain until 1942, along with the Snaefell Mountain Course on the neighbouring Isle of Man.

The trial led to a series of races at Brooklands, organised by the Charlotteville cycling club under Bill Mills, a professional rider who founded the weekly magazine, The Bicycle. Mills was one of few authorities to whom the NCU could turn for advice on road racing and it was he who wrote the NCU's rules, at the request of the secretary, H. N. Crowe.

The wording that Mills chose in 1933 led to the NCU's long civil war with a later rival body, the British League of Racing Cyclists. Mills wrote: "No massed start race shall be permitted, other than on an enclosed circuit, unless the course is closed under statute by the competent authority, to other vehicular traffic." Nine years later, in October 1942 and after the BLRC had broken away from the NCU because of that insistence on closed roads, Mills regretted what he had done: "In 1933 it was impossible to foresee the future... the war, the changing conditions on the road, the decline of track sport, the growing demand for massed start under real road conditions. My notes covered conditions as they existed in 1933."

At the time, said the writer and team manager Chas Messenger, "there were thousands riding in time trials and, apart from a once-in-a-while article in the cycling press, they knew little or nothing about road racing." The Brooklands races inspired some riders and one, Percy Stallard, took advantage of low wartime traffic in 1942 to organise a race on the open road from Llangollen to Wolverhampton. The NCU banned him sine die - until further notice - and he and others formed the British League of Racing Cyclists as a rival.

== Rivalry with the BLRC ==
The NCU and the BLRC (British League of Racing Cyclists) remained rivals for 17 years, a position which split British cycling. The BLRC's position was that racing on the road was not illegal, that it did not obstruct other travellers, and that it gave riders from England and Wales the experience to compete internationally. The NCU had entrusted its wartime administration to an emergency committee which did not have power to change major rules. The journalist John Dennis said the NCU still believed that racing on the road threatened all cycling and did not want to make any change while so many members were out of the country, fighting in the war. The two sides maintained their positions when peace came in 1945 and for many years each banned the members of the other.

The rivalry ended in 1959 when the two merged to form the British Cycling Federation.

== Herne Hill ==
The National Cyclists' Union leased the velodrome at Herne Hill for 21 years from 25 March 1942.

== Records ==
The papers of the Bicycle Union and the NCU, mainly committee minutes, are held by the Modern Records Centre at the University of Warwick Library, England.
