= Cycling UK =

Charity promoting UK cycling

- Formation: 1878
- Type: NGO
- Legal status: Private company limited by guarantee & Registered charity
- Purpose: Support cyclists and encourage bicycle use in the UK.
- Headquarters: Guildford
- Location: Surrey, United Kingdom
- Coordinates: 51.260124°N 0.590059°W
- Members: 68,431 (2019)
- President: Jon Snow
- Interim CEO: Pete Fitzboydon
- Main organ: Cycle magazine
- Website: cyclinguk.org
- Formerly called: The Bicycle Touring Club, Cyclists' Touring Club

Cycling UK is a trading name of the Cyclists' Touring Club (CTC), which is a charitable organisation supporting cyclists and promoting bicycle use. Cycling UK is registered at Companies House as "Cyclists' Touring Club", and is covered by company law. It works at a national and local level to lobby for cyclists' needs and wants, provides services to members, and organises local groups for local activism and those interested in recreational cycling. The original Cyclists' Touring Club began in the 1800s with a focus on cycle touring, but these days has a much broader sphere of interest encompassing utility cycling, bicycle commuting and many forms of recreational cycling. Prior to April 2016, the organisation operated under the brand "CTC, the national cycling charity". As of February 2020, the organisation's president is the newsreader Jon Snow.

== Present-day activities ==
Cycling UK promotes cycling in the United Kingdom. It is a membership organisation with 68,431 members as of 2019. Its objectives (registered with the Charity Commission) are to:

1. "Promote community participation in healthy recreation by promoting the amateur sport of cycling, cycle touring and associated amateur sports;
2. "Preserve and protect the health and safety of the public by encouraging and facilitating cycling and the safety of cyclists;
3. "Advance education by whatever means [Cycling UK's] trustees think fit, including the provision of cycling, training and educational activities related to cycling;
4. "Promote the conservation and protection of the environment."

Cycling UK works to encourage more people to take up cycling, to make cycling safer and more enjoyable, and to provide cyclists with the support and resources they need. Its activities vary from road safety promotion to the provision of organised cycling holidays. Cycling UK does not focus on competitive cycle sport, since that has its own organisations, such as British Cycling, Cycling Time Trials, Road Records Association, etc.

Cycling UK's successes have been a benchmarking project to spread best practice in cycle-friendly infrastructure design, and a grant of nearly £1 million to promote national standards for cycle training, standards Cycling UK helped to develop. In 2015, Cycling UK received funding of £1 million for their social outreach project, the Big Bike Revival. The Big Bike Revival ran over the summer of 2015 and held over 1,600 events throughout England, benefiting over 50,000 people by "reviving" people's old bikes and giving them the skills and confidence to cycle more. The project was awarded a further £500,000 by Cycling Minister Robert Goodwill in February 2016 to continue in summer 2016, and in June the Scottish Government awarded Cycling UK Scotland £450,000 to bring the Big Bike Revival to Scotland.

Cycling UK is organised at district level, with local groups organising cycle rides on Sundays and during the week. The more leisurely rides are planned around café stops, the quality of the ride often being judged on the standard of the cakes.

In 2008, the CTC Charitable Trust (formerly a part of the organisation charged with cycling development activities) launched the Cycle Champions programme. Using funding from the National Lottery's Wellbeing Fund, CTC employed 13 Community Cycling development Officers around England to promote cycling in all sectors of the community, particularly those not traditionally associated with cycling. They recruited 'Cycle Champions' within the community to work towards these goals as volunteers.

In 2009, CTC, in partnership with ContinYou and UK Youth, launched Bike Club, a programme funded by Cycling England with the intention of promoting cycling, and its associated learning experiences, among children and young people aged 10–20. Locally based officers advised on the establishment of clubs and the application for funding.

The members' magazine, Cycle, covers subjects including ride reports, product reviews and legal and technical advice. Members benefit from public liability insurance, which is extended to cover rides organised under the auspices of Cycling UK Local Groups.

Cycling UK is also the organisation behind the British Cycle Quest, an informal competition which challenges members to visit six designated places in each of the counties of England, Scotland and Wales.

Cycling UK is currently a member of the European Cyclists' Federation.

Cycling UK believes that UK cyclists should continue to be free to decide whether or not they wear cycle helmets, and campaigns to keep the UK's laws as they are. Cycling UK says that this is because putting too much emphasis on cycle helmets makes people think that cycling is much more dangerous than it actually is, and can put people off. Cycling UK believes that health benefits of cycling far outweigh the risks, so it is important that people are not discouraged. Cycling UK also feels that the real risks faced by cyclists, such as excessive vehicle speed, are often forgotten when all the discussions concentrate on cycle helmets. Cycling UK reviewed the current Highway Code before it was published, and helped reword some sections that could have been detrimental for cyclists.

Cycling UK is a founder of the Slower Speeds Initiative, an unincorporated association dedicated to reducing traffic speeds on all roads. CTC works with organisations such as Transport 2000 and the Walk Wheel Cycle Trust (formerly Sustrans), and has charitable offshoots, the CTC Charitable Trust and the Cyclists' Defence Fund.

== History ==
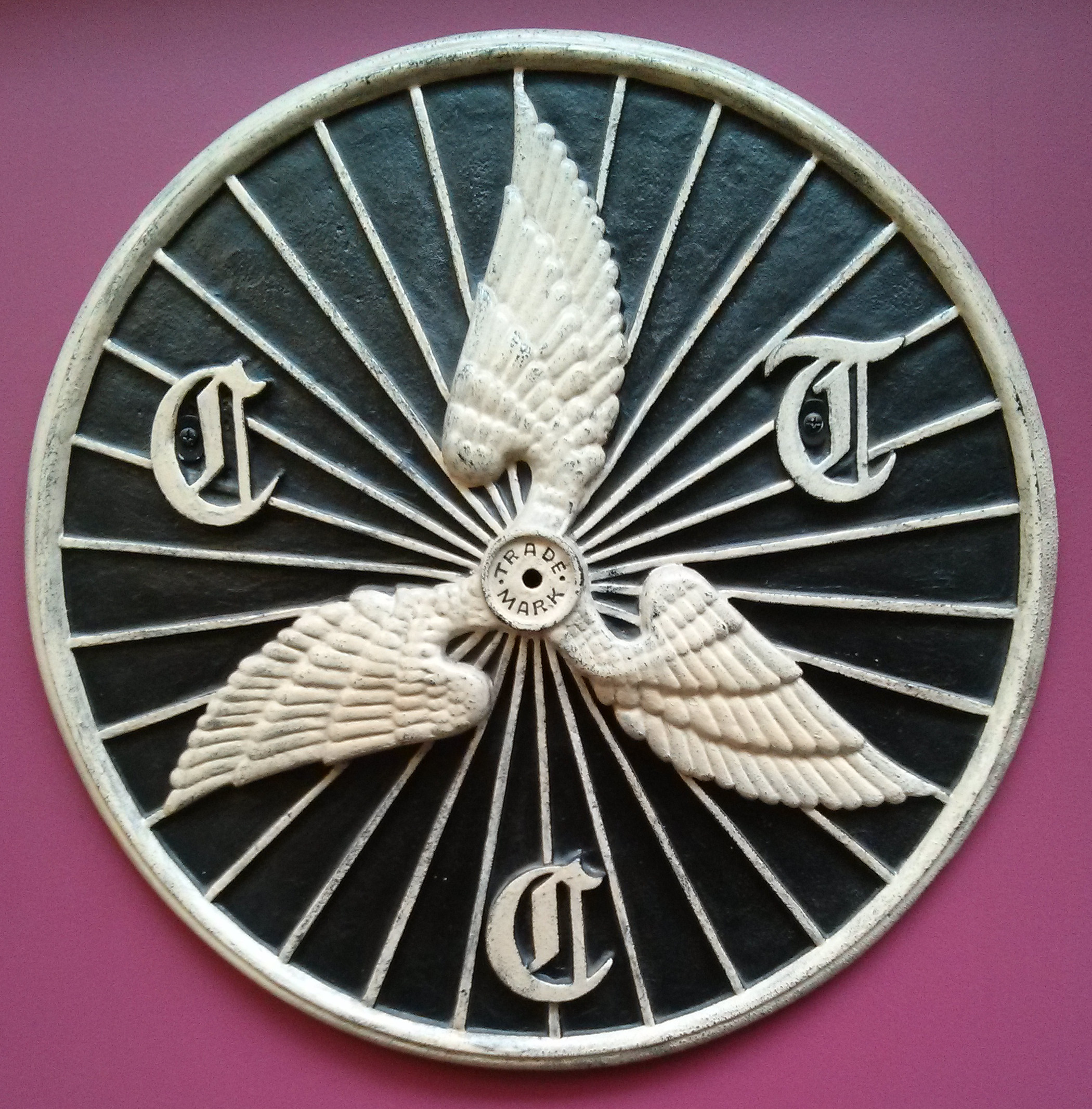
Old CTC sign on display at the National Museum of Scotland

Cycling UK has been known by various names over the course of its history:

- The Bicycle Touring Club (1878–1883)
- The Cyclists' Touring Club (1883–2009, remains CTC's legal name) The change from "Bicycle" to "Cyclists'" emphasised the fact that the club was also open to tricyclists - adult tricycles enjoyed considerable popularity at the time.
- CTC, the national cyclists' organisation (2009–2012)
- CTC, the national cycling charity (2012–2016)
- Cycling UK (2016–)

2016's branding change is intended to reflect the organisation's current activities and avoid placing an undue emphasis on its historic touring focus.

=== Foundation ===
Cycling UK was founded at Harrogate, in Yorkshire, on 5 August 1878 by an Edinburgh medical student, Stanley Cotterell, under its original name of the Bicycle Touring Club. It claims to be the oldest transport organisation in the world. Its headquarters were wherever Cotterell happened to be living. It had 80 members, all men. The first woman, Jeanie A Welford, joined in 1880. In 1883, the Bicycle Touring Club was renamed the Cyclists' Touring Club to open membership to tricyclists. Membership rose to 10,627 and CTC opened a headquarters at 139-140 Fleet Street in London.

Members, like those of other clubs, often rode in uniform. CTC appointed an official tailor. The uniform was a dark green Devonshire serge jacket, knickerbockers and a "Stanley helmet with a small peak". The colour changed to grey when green proved impractical because it showed the dirt. Groups often rode with a bugler at their head to sound changes of direction or to bring the group to a halt. Confusion could be caused when groups met and mistook each other's signals.

=== Roads improvement ===
The CTC shared some interests with the Bicycle Union, founded in February 1878 and instigated by Gerard Cobb (a Cambridge University music tutor, president of the university's bicycle club, and later also a member of the CTC's national council). In July 1878, Cobb led the Bicycle Union's lobbying of the Local Government Board, one of the official bodies managing British highways, and also actively campaigned for highway improvements in Cambridge. After the Bicycle Union was renamed the National Cyclists' Union (in 1883) it continued to campaign for highway improvements, successfully pursuing an 1885 legal action, with support from highway engineer Thomas Codrington, regarding the road between Birmingham and Halesowen. In October 1886, the CTC and NCU pooled resources and formed the Roads Improvement Association. This did not present itself as a cycling organisation, instead focusing on production of technical literature distributed to highways boards and surveyors to promote improved construction and maintenance methods. This changed at the start of the 20th century. In 1900, William Rees Jeffreys was elected to the CTC's council; in 1901, he became the CTC's RIA representative and later the same year became its honorary secretary. Jeffreys believed the RIA should focus more on political lobbying and push for a national highway authority and state funding of highways. In 1903, he was the first witness to give evidence to a British government inquiry into highway administration, and provided extensive RIA technical information on road surfaces sourced from cyclists, saying "The bicycle is perhaps the best road inspector there is." He told the CTC Gazette: "To no class in the community are good roads so important as to cyclists."

However, as many cyclists also became motorists, the RIA began to change its focus. The RIA's 1901 AGM was held at the offices of the CTC, which also owned the RIA's furniture; RIA council meetings comprised five representatives from each of the CTC and NCU and two or three from the Automobile Club of Great Britain. In 1903 Jeffreys became administrative secretary of the Automobile Club and secretary of the Motor Union of Great Britain and Ireland, which shared offices in London's Albemarle Street with the RIA. Jeffreys "became an arch motorist and the RIA morphed into a motoring organisation".

=== Cycling accommodation ===
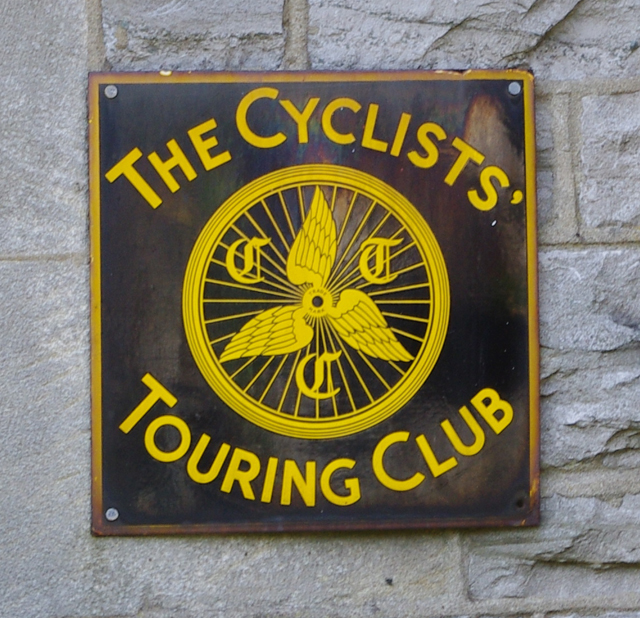
CTC plaque on the wall of a guest house in Ingleton, North Yorkshire

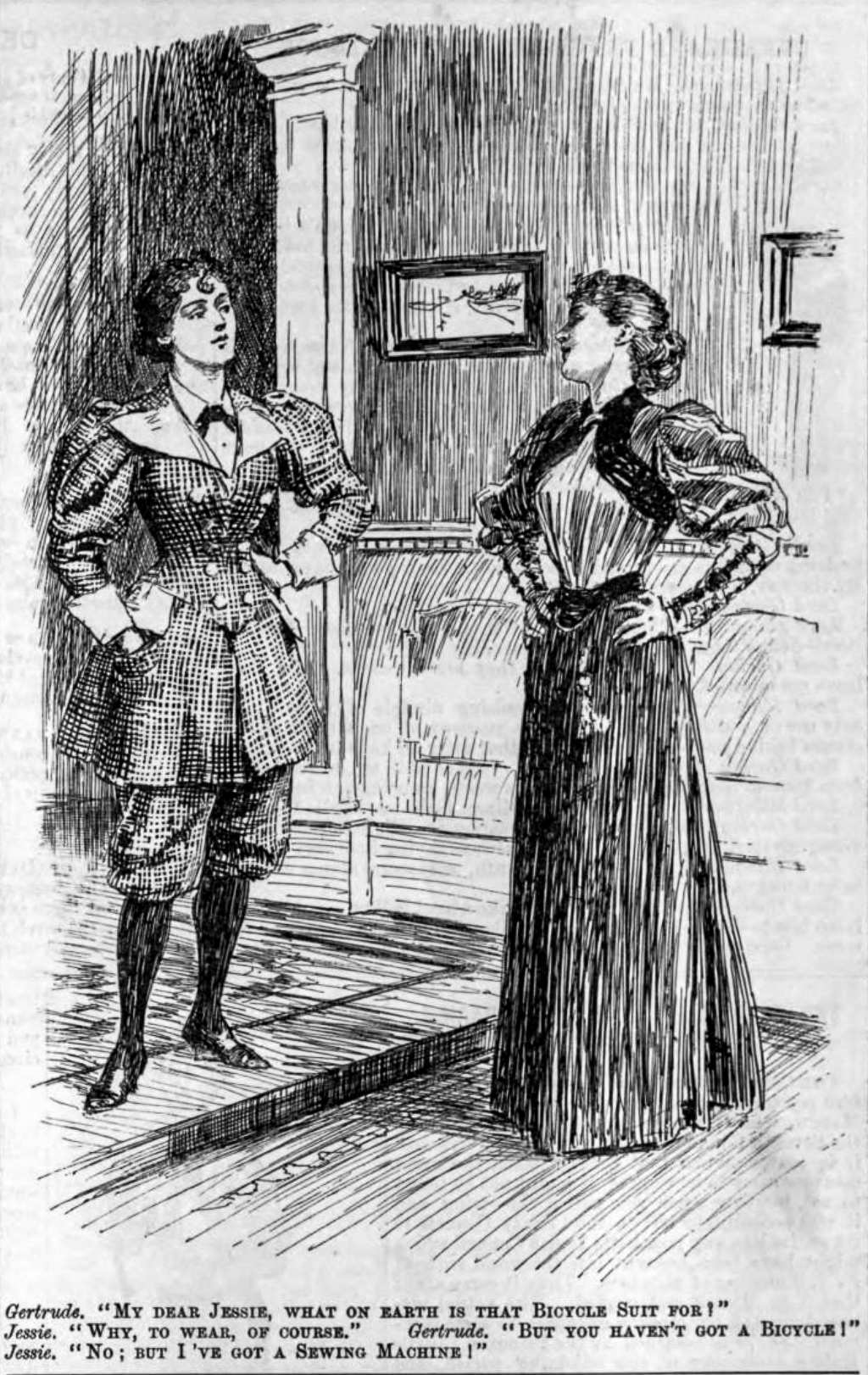
1895 cartoon contrasting the bicycle suit (left) vs. conventional feminine attire (right)

From 1887, the Cyclists' Touring Club gave seals of approval, in the form of a cast iron plaque (later replaced by an enamel plate) showing the winged-wheel symbol of CTC, for mounting on an outside wall of hotels and restaurants which offered good accommodation and service to cyclists. A few of the metal signs still exist, as do a handful of road signs put up by CTC to warn cyclists of steep hills: usually steep going down, which was as much a problem for riders of large-wheel ordinaries, or "penny-farthings", as going up. The CTC no longer puts up general road signs—although the right to do so is retained—and approved establishments are offered a plastic window-sticker.

In 1898 CTC became embroiled in a court case to defend a member denied what she thought adequate service at a hotel carrying the club's badge. Florence Wallace Pomeroy, Viscountess Harberton (1843–1911), of Cromwell Road, Kensington — wife of James, 6th Viscount Harberton, an Anglo-Irish peer, and president of the Western Rational Dress Society — cycled on the morning of 27 October 1898 to have lunch at the Hautboy Hotel in Ockham, Surrey. Lady Harberton's campaigning for society to accept that women could wear "rational" dress on a bicycle and not ankle-length dresses led her to wear a jacket and a pair of long and baggy trousers which came together just above the ankle. She walked into the coffee room and asked to be served. The landlady, a Mrs Martha Sprague, showed her instead into the bar parlour. CTC went into action, mounting a prosecution for "refusing food to a traveller". The landlady was acquitted and CTC lost the unusually large amount of money it had allotted to the case, which had been considered at the root of cyclists' rights and the values of CTC.

=== Attempt to include motorists ===
In 1906 CTC asked the High Court to amend its constitution so that it could admit all tourists, including car-drivers. A majority of members - 10,495 to 2,231 - had voted the previous year for the change to take place. The court ruled that CTC could not protect the interests of cyclists and drivers at the same time and denied permission.

=== Delaying segregated cycle paths ===
In 1926 the CTC discussed an unsuccessful motion calling for cycle tracks to be built on each side of roads for "the exclusive use of cyclists", and that cyclists could be taxed, providing the revenue was used for the provision of such tracks. The first (and one of the very few) dedicated roadside optional cycle tracks was built in 1934, as an experiment for the Ministry of Transport, located in London beside Western Avenue between Hanger Lane and Greenford Road. It was thought that "the prospect of cycling in comfort as well as safety would be appreciated by most cyclists themselves". However, the idea ran into trenchant opposition from cycling groups, with the CTC distributing pamphlets warning against the threat of cycle paths.

Local CTC branches organised mass meetings to reject the use of cycle tracks and any suggestion that cyclists should be forced to use such devices. In 1935, a packed general meeting of the CTC adopted a motion rejecting ministerial plans for cycle path construction. The CTC were listened to, and the use of cycle tracks largely fell out of favour in the UK until the early 1970s.

In 1996 the UK Cyclists' Touring Club and the Institute of Highways and Transportation jointly produced a set of Cycle-Friendly Infrastructure guidelines that placed segregated cycling facilities at the bottom of the hierarchy of measures designed to promote cycling.

=== Conversion to charity ===
In September 2012, the Cyclists' Touring Club was merged with the CTC Charitable Trust, forming a single charitable organisation. This followed approval by The Charity Commission for England and Wales in June 2012. It was stated that conversion to a single unified charity would result in financial savings, allow the income of CTC to be boosted by up to £100,000 by reclaiming Gift Aid, and help to build public recognition and support. CTC members had voted overwhelmingly in favour of amending the CTC's Memorandum and Articles to enable the registration as a unified charity, with almost 9,000 members voting at the AGM, and 92.7% voting in favour.

=== Rebrand to Cycling UK ===
In April 2016, CTC rebranded to Cycling UK, following a poll of members. However many of the district groups are still known as "CTC".

== See also ==
- British Cycling
- Sustrans
- Audax UK
- Cycle touring
- Pedals (Nottingham)
