= Jeanie Welford =

British photographer

Jeanie A. Welford
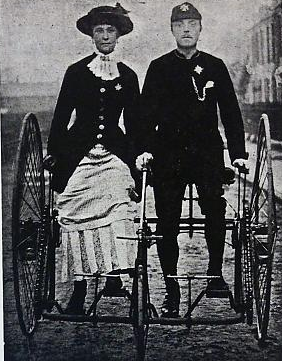
- with her husband on a sociable tricycle
- Born: Jeanie Agnes Morgan; 8 December 1854; Oldbury, West Midlands, England
- Died: 1947 (aged 92–93)
- Occupation: Photographer
- Spouse: "W.D." Welford

Jeanie A. Welford or Jeanie Agnes Morgan (8 December 1854 – 22 August 1947) was a British photographer and the first British woman member of a British cycling club. She ran a photography business with studios in London, Birmingham and Rottingdean and won over 100 medals for her work.

== Life ==
Welford was born in Oldbury. Her brother Stanley was a member of the Cyclists' Touring Club (CTC) and both of them were early adopters of the emerging technology. She was the first of two women who put themselves forward for membership of the CTC. The CTC was unusual in that it not only allowed women to cycle but they could become equal members of the club. She applied for membership as Jeanie Morgan but she was soon married to Richard Walter Deverell "W.D." Welford. Her husband was a founding member and the first paid secretary of the club and he issued her membership card. Both of them were keen and talented photographers and they lived in Newcastle upon Tyne, before they moved to a flat in London. Welford could not ride a bicycle when she joined but she used a tricycle which were popular. Once in London she took bicycle lessons and she had to carry her machine down to street level before setting out.

Her husband died in 1919 and Welford ran the photography business which had three different studios in London, Birmingham and Rottingdean. Welford had four photographs in the 1897 Royal Photographic Society's exhibition. Welford amassed over 100 medals and awards for her photographs. Her work was still being cited in 1984. She continued her interest in cycling and in 1938 she attended the annual CTC meeting in Harrogate. She was pictured with the founder of the CTC and that was the first year that she was elected an honorary membership which over time became a life membership.

She was found by chance by George Smith Saynert who was the CTC oldest active CTC member in her retirement in Brighton in the 1930s. In 1939 the John Players company issued a set of cigarette cards with the theme of cycling. The early photo of her and her husband on a sociable tricycle was recreated in colour and received wide circulation. The text on the card noted that Mrs Welford was still well at the age of 84.

She remained active until the final year of her life. She died on 22 August 1949.
