= Henry Sturmey =

British inventor and journalist (1857–1930)

John James Henry Sturmey (1857–1930), known as Henry Sturmey, is best remembered as the inventor with James Archer of the Sturmey-Archer three-speed hub for bicycles, but he was a technical editor and journalist heavily involved as a pioneer of the cycling and automotive industries. Born at Norton-sub-Hamdon, Somerset, on 28 February 1857 he died aged 72 at his home in Coventry on 8 January 1930.

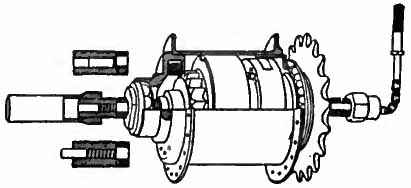
Cross-sectional diagram of the Sturmey-Archer three-speed hub

== Maths and science ==
Henry Sturmey rode his first bicycle while at school in Weymouth when in his mid-teens in 1872 and became a keen cyclist. He was a touring enthusiast rather than interested in track racing. Sturmey's first post was an assistant-master at Brixton Hill College, London S.W. He resigned in 1877 to devote himself to writing a book on cycling published as The Indispensable Bicyclist's Handbook. Dealing with every bicycle on the market and 300 pages long the first edition was sold out within a month. Following an unsuccessful attempt to sell bicycles made to his own design he took up the post of mathematics and science master at Brynavor Hall College, Towyn but continued to develop material for another book on cycling. He then moved to Coventry to The British Boys School in King Street near the heart of the new cycle industry.

== Cyclist ==
Becoming associated with the publishing firm of Iliffe & Son around 1877, he edited the Cyclist later The Cycle and Motorcycle Trades Review and frequently contributed to other cycling papers. Sturmey was from 1879 an early leader in what became the Cyclists' Touring Club. In 1893 he founded the International Cycling Association to hold the World's cycling championships each year. It was superseded in 1901 by the French-inspired Union Cycliste Internationale.

== Autocar ==
Sturmey became one of the first editors of Autocar, printed by Iliffe, in 1895. Walter Staner took over the editorship from Sturmey in July 1901 following his premature retirement from injuries received while road-testing a car. Sturmey then founded The Motor first published in January 1903.

== Variable hub gear ==
The first commercially successful compact epicyclic hub gear was a two-speed designed by William Reilly. It was simply called The Hub and was launched in 1898 by The Hub 2-Speed Gear Company of Salford. William Reilly signed away his rights to any of his future bicycle gear inventions to The Hub company and soon left them to work at Royce of Manchester.

Henry Sturmey took the hub gear concept further and designed a three-speed hub which, unlike the original version of The Hub, incorporated automatic freewheeling. Sturmey successfully applied for a patent for his three-speed hub in August 1901. By March 1902, he had entered an agreement giving sole rights to the hub to Frank Bowden, chairman of the Raleigh bicycle company.

A few weeks later, Bowden discovered that a similar three-speed hub was being offered to rival bicycle makers. Although patented under the name of James Archer, this was a design by William Reilly, designer of The Hub. Archer's patent application had been submitted shortly before Sturmey's. To prevent Raleigh's competitors, such as Humber, gaining rights to Reilly's three-speed, Bowden bought exclusive rights to it. Having now acquired rights to two similar three-speed hubs, Bowden decided that it was a more practical and profitable proposition to manufacture Reilly's hub rather than Sturmey's.

Henry Sturmey was bitterly disappointed by Frank Bowden's action and threatened to take his hub elsewhere. Sturmey was a well known expert on bicycle gearing and his name was valuable to Bowden to give the new three-speed hub credibility. Bowden persuaded Sturmey to stay with the project and an elaborate story was concocted to give the impression of technical collaboration between Sturmey, Archer, Reilly, G.P. Mills (Raleigh's chief designer) and Alfred Pellant, the agent for Archer and Reilly. This story portrayed Sturmey as the leading figure in the fictitious collaboration, a pretence he maintained for the rest of his life. However, Sturmey's involvement with The Three-Speed Gear Syndicate established by Bowden to make and market the three-speed was very brief and in reality consisted of little more than allowing his name to be used to endorse the product. The syndicate was formally established in January 1903 but by July 1904, Sturmey had ceased to be a director. He never again had any involvement with Bowden, Raleigh or the syndicate's successor, Sturmey-Archer. On the same day that the syndicate was formed, Archer and Reilly entered into a legal agreement whereby the royalties for the "Archer" hub would be paid to its true inventor, Reilly.

Inventive as ever, in 1921 Henry Sturmey applied successfully for a patent on a five-speed hub gear. It was more advanced than any other hub gear then available but he was unable to find a manufacturer willing to produce it. It is deeply ironic that no hub gear designed by Sturmey was ever series produced.

== Daimler ==
Friendly with company promoter Harry J Lawson Sturmey invested heavily in and became closely associated with Daimler and was a director and deputy chairman. The initial prospectus for the flotation of the Daimler company listed him among the directors as J J Henry Sturmey of Iliffe & Sturmey, Coventry. Chairman H J Lawson rarely attended board meetings, Sturmey usually presided and involved himself in day-to-day activities gaining the reputation of "live wire" at the firm. He used the columns of Autocar to promote and support Daimler. However the business was not profitable and the directors borrowed to finance further investment. A very stormy meeting of shareholders brought about the appointment of an independent committee of investigation which reported privately to shareholders in December 1898 attacking important board decisions and pointing out the current board members' lack of technical experience. At the Annual General Meeting of shareholders held the following month four board members retired and E H Bayley and Sir Edward Jenkinson were appointed. Not then up for re-election Sturmey remained a director but did resign from the board in May 1899 following major changes in the members of senior management.

Adding to it a body built to his own design by Mulliners of Northampton, Sturmey took delivery of the ninth Daimler built at Coventry in September 1897 and in October carried out a well-publicised epic drive from John o' Groats to Land's End accompanied by Richard Ashley, a mechanic.
