= England's Economic Heartland =

English subnational transport body

England's Economic Heartland is one of seven sub-national transport bodies in England. EEH is a partnership of councils, stretching from Swindon and Oxfordshire in the west to Cambridgeshire in the east, and from Northamptonshire down to Hertfordshire. The area includes the Oxford-Cambridge Arc, as defined by Government.

== About ==
England's Economic Heartland was founded in November 2015.

Since September 2023 it has been chaired by Cllr Liz Leffman, leader of Oxfordshire County Council. It is overseen by a Board containing the leaders or cabinet members/ portfolio holders from its constituent authorities.

It is jointly funded by the Department for Transport and its local and combined authority members.

== Constituent members ==
Interactive map of constituent authorities
- Oxfordshire County Council
- Swindon Borough Council
- West Northamptonshire Council
- North Northamptonshire Council
- Buckinghamshire Council
- Milton Keynes Council
- Bedford Borough Council
- Central Bedfordshire Council
- Luton Borough Council
- Hertfordshire County Council
- Cambridgeshire County Council
- Peterborough City Council
- Cambridgeshire and Peterborough Combined Authority

== Role ==
In common with other sub-national transport bodies, England's Economic Heartland advises the Secretary of State for Transport on the strategic transport priorities in the region which would support economic growth.

It also works with councils, Department for Transport, transport bodies such as Network Rail and National Highways, and other organisations, to seek to improve the existing transport system, for example by making it better integrated between modes.

In March 2025 Secretary of State for Transport, Heidi Alexander, wrote to England's Economic Heartland and said it had a 'key role to play in ensuring East West Rail is part of an integrated transport network and that the benefits of investment in the new line are fully realised'.

In addition, England's Economic Heartland says it supports its local and combined authority members with data, tools and expert advice, for example around ways they can plan for reducing carbon emissions from transport in their areas.

== Transport Strategy ==
In 2021 England's Economic Heartland produced a regional Transport Strategy which guides decisions about investment and priorities up to 2050.

== Priorities ==
In February 2025 England's Economic Heartland submitted evidence as part of the UK Government's call for evidence on the multiyear Spending Review.

This set out what England's Economic Heartland refers to as 'key transport improvements' identified through its evidence base and agreed by its Board, which would 'unlock significant economic growth opportunities'. This includes 'maximising East West Rail', for example through enhanced connectivity to stations by bus and active travel, and delivery of the missing Aylesbury-Milton Keynes link; delivery of Ely Junction upgrades; and funding to improve bus services and develop mass rapid transit networks.

== See also ==
- Cambridge - Milton Keynes - Oxford corridor
- Sub-national transport bodies
