= Laurens Meintjes =

South African cyclist

Personal information
- Full name: Laurens Smitz Meintjies
- Born: 9 June 1868 Aberdeen, Cape Colony
- Died: 30 March 1941 (aged 72) Potgietersrust, South Africa

Cycling career
- Sport: Cycling
- Discipline: Track
- Role: Rider
- Rider type: Endurance
Medal record
Men's track cycling
Representing Transvaal
World Championships
Gold medal – first place	1893 Chicago	Stayers

Laurens Meintjes (9 June 1868 – 30 March 1941) was a South African track cyclist and winner of the inaugural stayers contest at the 1893 ICA Track Cycling World Championships in Chicago. This victory made him the first African to win a world championship. Meintjes was born in Aberdeen and died in Potgietersrust.
