= John S. Johnson (sportsman) =

American cyclist (1869–1936)

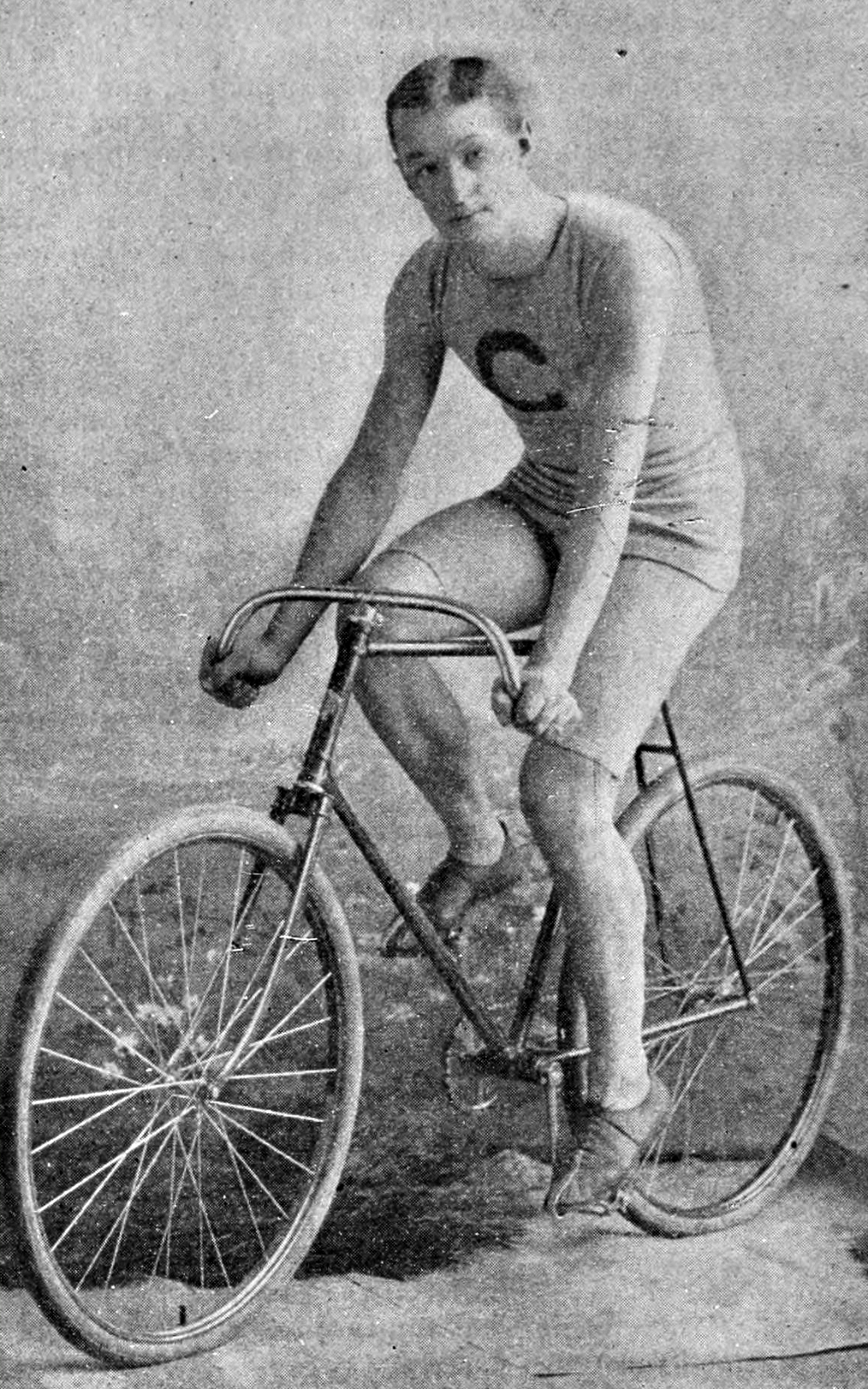
- John S. Johnson

Personal information
- Full name: Johan Sigfrid Jonsson
- Nickname: "Johnny"
- Born: May 11, 1871 Kil, Sweden
- Died: January 17, 1934 (aged 62) Minneapolis, Minnesota, US

Cycling career
- Sport: Cycling
- Discipline: Track
- Role: Rider
- Rider type: Sprinter

John Sigfried Johnson (May 11, 1873 – January 17, 1934) was an early American cyclist and speed skater. He was born as Johan Sigfrid Jonsson in Sweden and emigrated with his parents to Minnesota in the United States in 1881.

Johnson was the first to bicycle 1-mile in less than two minutes, or 1:56.6. This happened in 1892 at a racing track in Independence, Iowa. Besides racing on the track, early in his career he also competed in road races. Johnson was also a world record holder in speed skating, and won world championship titles in both sports. Later in his career, Johnson rode for racing teams sponsored by the bicycle manufacturers E.C. Stearns Bicycle Agency of Syracuse, N.Y., and Schwinn Bicycle Co. of Chicago. He retired from competitive cycling in 1900. He died January 17, 1934, in Minneapolis, Minnesota.

== See also ==
- For more early American bicycle racing history, see the League of American Wheelmen and Major Taylor.
