= Major Taylor =

American racing cyclist (1878–1932)

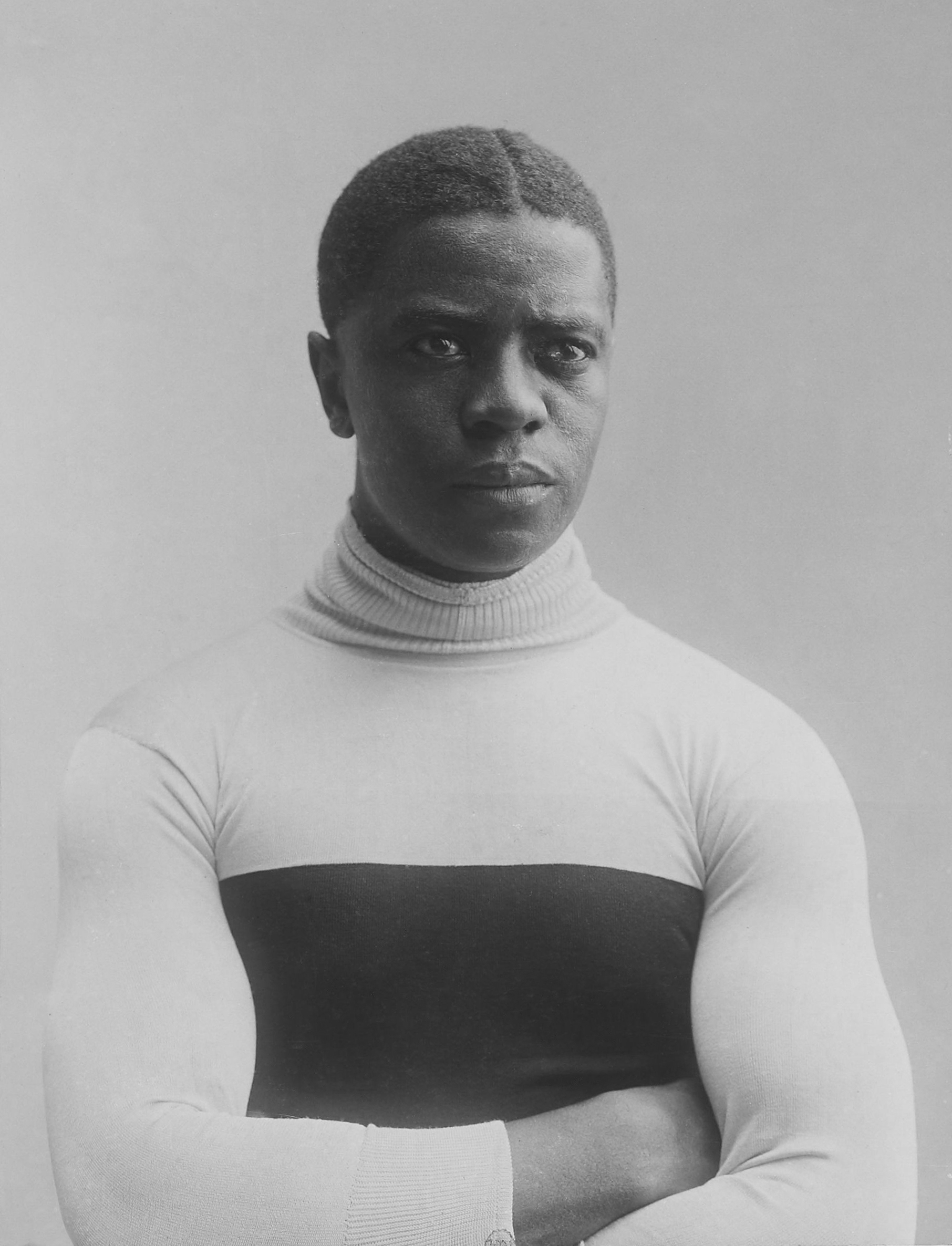
- Taylor in 1907

Personal information
- Full name: Marshall Walter Taylor
- Nickname: Worcester Whirlwind
- Born: November 26, 1878 Indianapolis, Indiana, U.S.
- Died: June 21, 1932 (aged 53) Chicago, Illinois, U.S.

Cycling career
- Sport: Cycling
- Discipline: Track
- Role: Rider
- Rider type: Sprinter

Amateur teams
- 1894–1895: See-Saw Cycling Club
- 1895: Albion Cycling Club

Professional teams
- 1896: Worcester Cycle Manufacturing Company
- 1899: E. C. Stearns Bicycle Agency
- 1900: Iver Johnson's Arms & Cycle Works

Major wins
- LAW Sprint Championship (1899); National Sprint Championship (1900)
Medal record
Men's track cycling
Representing United States
World Championships
Gold medal – first place	1899 Montreal	Sprint

Marshall Walter "Major" Taylor (November 26, 1878 – June 21, 1932) was an American professional cyclist. He has been called "the first Black American global sports superstar."

He was born and raised in Indianapolis, where he worked in bicycle shops and began racing multiple distances in the track and road disciplines of cycling. As a teenager, he moved to Worcester, Massachusetts, with his employer/coach/mentor and continued his successful amateur career, which included breaking track records.

Taylor turned professional in 1896, at the age of 18, living in cities on the East Coast and participating in multiple track events including six-day races. He moved his focus to the sprint event in 1897, competing in a national racing circuit, winning many races and gaining popularity with the public. In 1898 and 1899, he set numerous world records in race distances ranging from the quarter-mile (0.4 km) to the two-mile (3.2 km).

Taylor won the 1-mile sprint event at the 1899 world track championships to become the first Black American to achieve the level of world champion and the second Black athlete to win a world championship in any sport (following Canadian boxer George Dixon, 1890). Taylor was also a national sprint champion in 1899 and 1900. He raced in the U.S., Europe and Australia from 1901 to 1904, beating the world's best riders. After a 2 1/2-year hiatus, he made a comeback in 1907–1909, before retiring at age 32 to his home in Worcester in 1910.

Towards the end of his life Taylor faced severe financial difficulties. He spent the final two years of his life in Chicago, Illinois, where he died of a heart attack in 1932.

Throughout his career he challenged the racial prejudice he encountered on and off the track and became a pioneering role model for other athletes facing racial discrimination. Several cycling clubs, trails, and events in the U.S. have been named in his honor, as well as the Major Taylor Velodrome in Indianapolis and Major Taylor Boulevard in Worcester. Other tributes include memorials and historic markers in Worcester, Indianapolis, and at his gravesite in Chicago. He has also been memorialized in film, music and fashion.

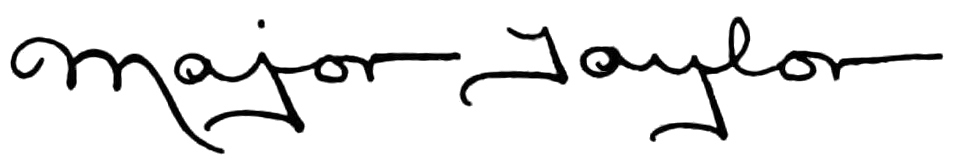
Major Taylor's Signature

== Early life ==
Marshall Walter Taylor was the son of Gilbert Taylor, a Civil War veteran, and Saphronia Kelter Taylor. His parents migrated from Louisville, Kentucky, and settled on a farm in Bucktown, Indiana, a rural area on the western edge of Indianapolis. He was one of eight children in a family of five girls and three boys. Around 1887, his father began working in Indianapolis as a coachman for a wealthy white family named Southard.

When Taylor was a child, he occasionally accompanied his father to work and soon became a close friend of the Southards' son, Daniel, who was the same age. Approximately from the age of 8 until he was about 12, Taylor lived with the Southards family and along with Daniel was tutored at their home. Taylor's living arrangement with the Southards provided him with more advantages than his parents could provide; however, this period of his life abruptly ended when the Southards moved to Chicago. Taylor, who remained in Indianapolis, returned to live at his parents' home and "was soon thrust into the real world."

The Southards had provided Taylor with his first bicycle. By 1891 or early 1892, he had become such an expert trick rider that Tom Hay, an Indianapolis bicycle shop owner, hired him to perform bicycle stunts in front of the Hay and Willits bicycle shop. Taylor earned $6 a week to clean the shop and perform the stunts, plus a free bicycle worth $35. It is likely that Taylor received his nickname of "Major" because he performed the cycling stunts wearing a military uniform. (Note: Andrew Ritchie, one of Taylor's biographers, offers other potential explanations for Taylor's nickname, but his military uniform appears to be the most likely reason, although Taylor never confirmed it.)

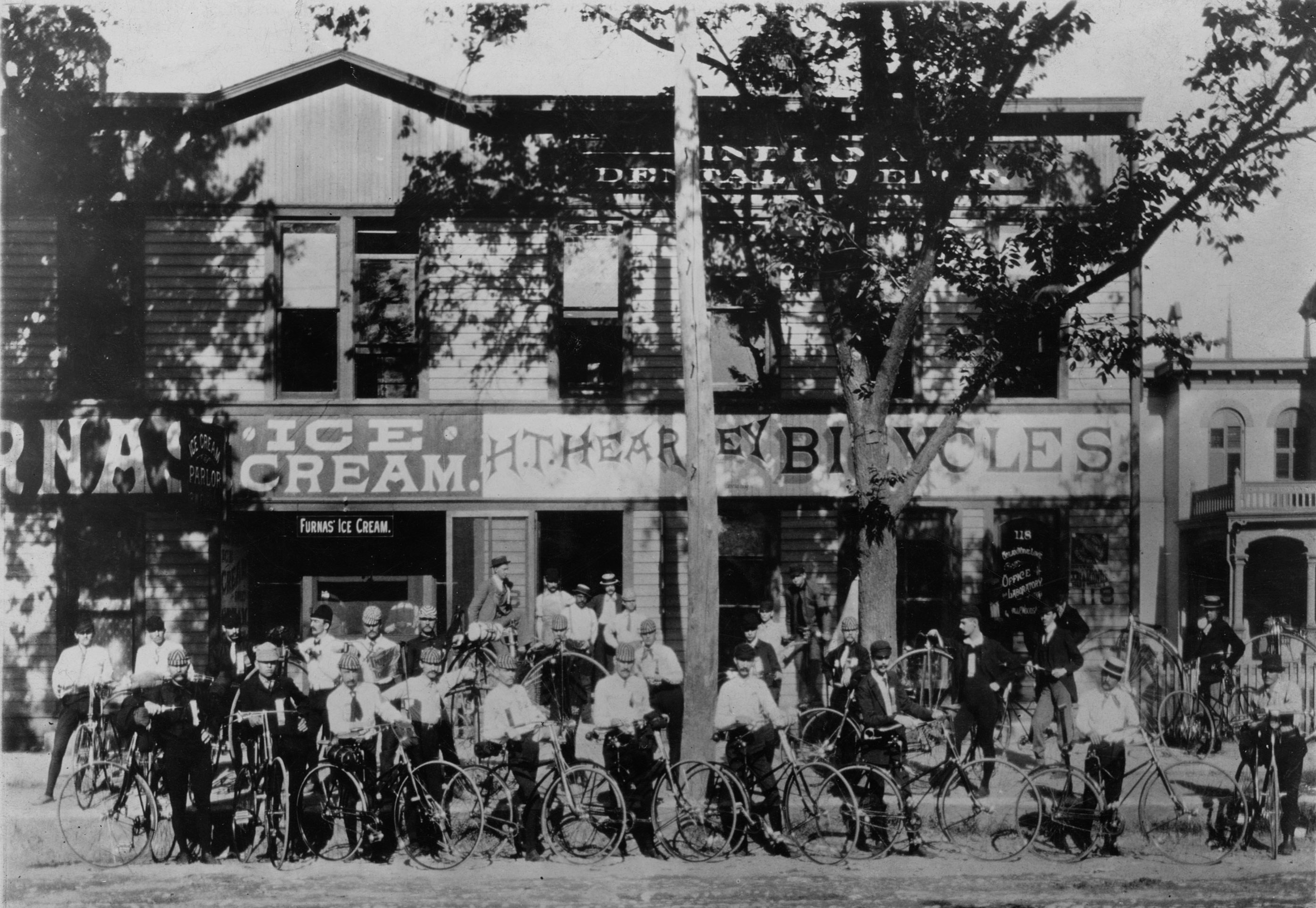
Harry T. Hearsey's bicycle shop in Downtown Indianapolis in 1896, where Taylor worked as a bicycle instructor

=== Early years and move to East Coast ===
Although Major Taylor competed in both road and track races during his amateur career, he excelled in the track sprints, especially the one-mile (1.6 km) race. The first cycling race Taylor won was a ten-mile (16 km) amateur event in Indianapolis in 1890. He received a 15-minute handicap (head start) in the road race because of his young age. Taylor subsequently traveled to Peoria, Illinois, to compete in another meet, finishing in third place in the under-16 age category.

Major Taylor encountered racial prejudice throughout his racing career from some of his competitors. In addition, some local track owners feared that other cyclists would refuse to compete if Taylor was present for a bicycle race and banned him from their tracks. In 1893, for example, after the 15-year-old Taylor beat a one-mile amateur track record, he was "hooted" and then barred from the track. Taylor joined the See-Saw Cycling Club, which was formed by black cyclists of Indianapolis who were unable to join the local all-white Zig-Zag Cycling Club.

Major Taylor won his first significant cycling competition on June 30, 1895, when he was the only rider to finish a grueling 75-mile (121 km) road race near his hometown of Indianapolis. During the race Taylor received threats from his white competitors, who did not know that he had entered the event until the start of the race. A few days later, on July 4, 1895, Taylor won a ten-mile road race in Indianapolis that made him eligible to compete at the national championships for Black racers in Chicago. Later that summer, he won the ten-mile championship race in Chicago by ten lengths and set a new record for Black cyclists of 27:32.

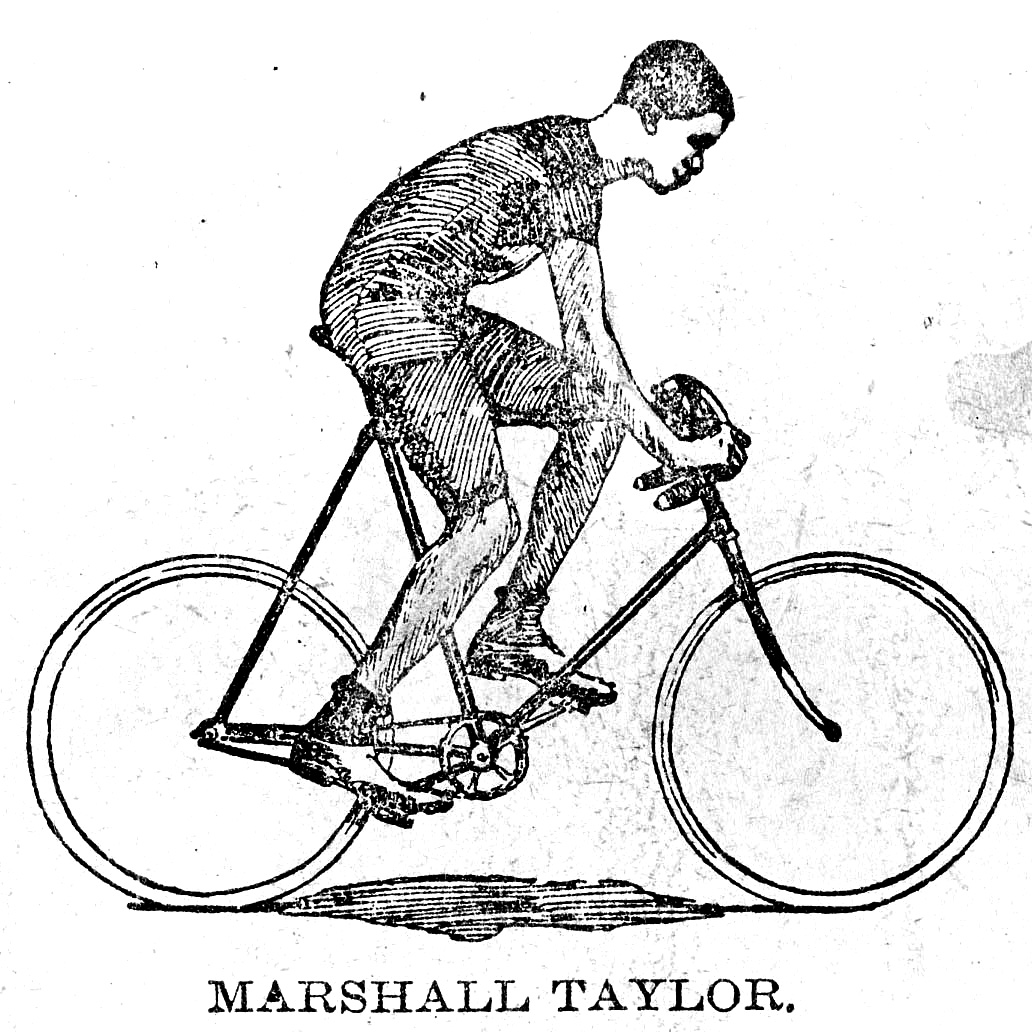
The earliest press image of Taylor, aged 18, from the July 6, 1895, edition of Indianapolis News

In 1895, Taylor and Munger relocated from Indianapolis to Worcester which, at that time, was a center of the U.S. bicycle industry and included half-a-dozen factories and thirty bicycle shops. Munger, who was Taylor's employer, lifelong friend, and mentor, had decided to move his bicycle manufacturing business to the state of Massachusetts, which was also a more tolerant area of the country.

Munger and business partner Charles Boyd established the Worcester Cycle Manufacturing Company with factories in Worcester and Middletown, Connecticut. For Taylor, who continued to work for Munger as a bicycle mechanic and messenger between the company's two factory locations, the move to the East Coast offered "higher visibility, larger crowds, increased sponsorship dollars, and greater access to world-class cycling venues." After Taylor's relocation to Massachusetts, he joined the all-Black Albion Cycling Club in 1895 and trained at the Worcester YMCA. Taylor is first mentioned in The New York Times on September 26, 1895, as a competitor in the Citizen Handicap event, a ten-mile race on Ocean Parkway in Brooklyn, New York. Taylor raced with a 1:30 handicap in a field of 200 competitors that included nine scratch riders.

In 1896, Taylor entered numerous races in the Northeastern states of Massachusetts, New Jersey, and Connecticut. After winning a ten-mile road race in Worcester, Taylor competed in the 25-mile (40 km) Irvington–Millburn race in New Jersey, also known as the Derby of the East. Within half a mile (0.8 km) of the finish line, someone startled Taylor by tossing ice water into his face and he finished in 23rd place. Taylor's first major East Coast race was in a League of American Wheelmen (LAW) one-mile contest in New Haven, Connecticut, where he started in last place but won the event. In August 1896, Taylor made a trip to Indianapolis, where he set an unofficial new track record of 2:11 1/5 for a distance of one mile at the Capital City velodrome, beating Walter Sanger's official track record of 2:19 2/5. (Taylor was not allowed to compete with Sanger, a professional racer, in a head-to-head contest because he was still an amateur.) Taylor's final amateur race took place on November 26, 1896, in the 25-mile Tatum Handicap at Jamaica, New York. Taylor finished the race in 14th place.

== Professional career ==
=== 1896: First races ===
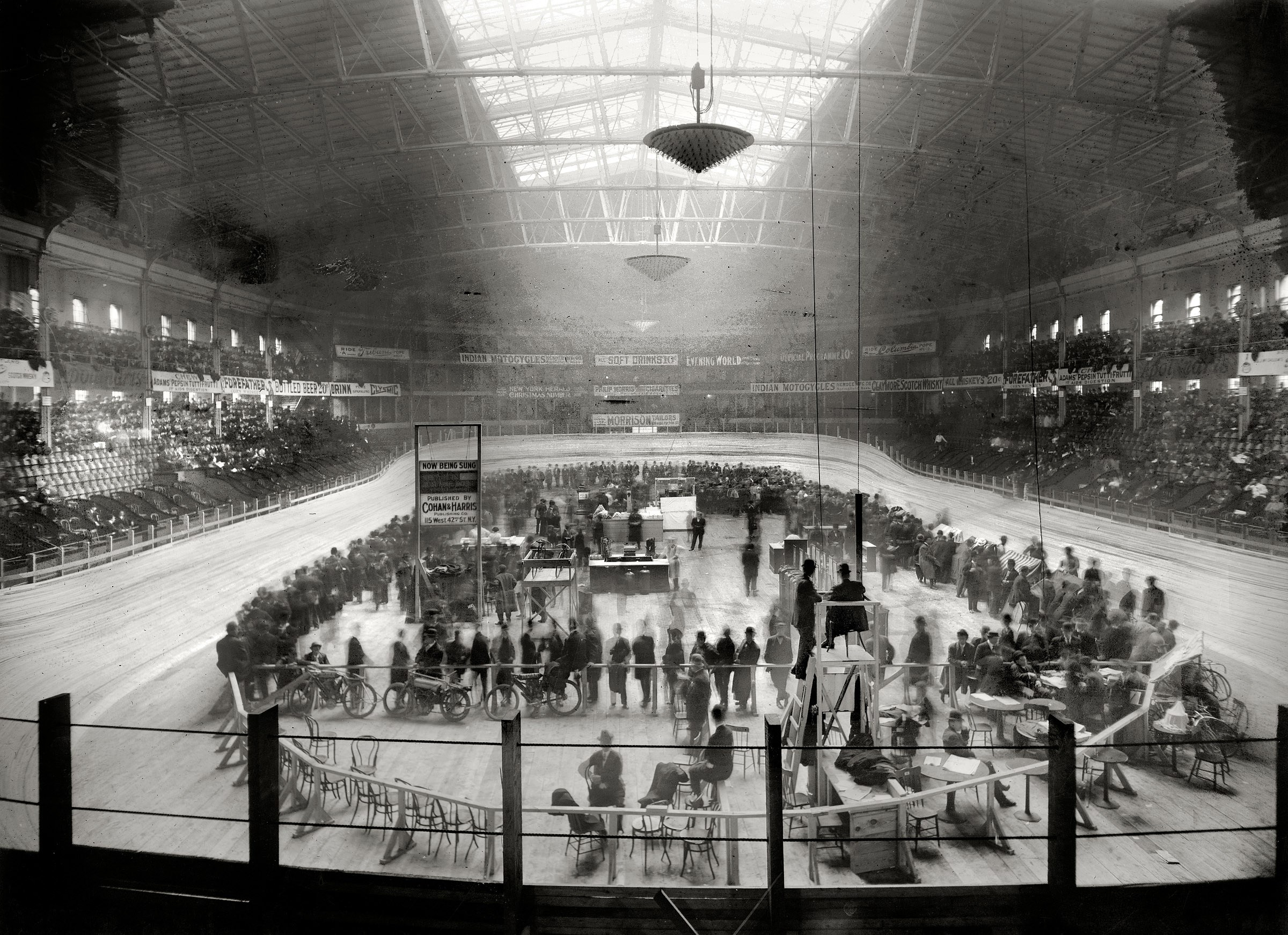
Madison Square Garden II (pictured in 1908) in New York City, the venue of Taylor's first professional race in 1896

Taylor turned professional in 1896, at the age of eighteen, and soon emerged as the "most formidable racer in America." Taylor's first professional race took place in front of 5,000 spectators on December 5, 1896.

He competed in a half-mile handicap event on an indoor track at New York City's Madison Square Garden II on the opening day of a multi-day event. Although the main event was a six-day race from December 6–12, other contests in shorter distances were held on December 5 to entertain the crowd. These races included the half-mile handicap for professionals in which Taylor competed, a half-mile race between Jay Eaton and Teddy Goodman, and a half-mile scratch race. In addition, there were half-mile scratch and handicap races for amateurs.

On December 5, Taylor began the half-mile handicap race with a 35-yard (32 m) advantage over the scratch racers. He beat a field of competitors that included Tom Cooper, Philadelphia's A.C. Meixwell, and scratch rider Eddie C. Bald, who represented New York's Syracuse, and rode a Barnes bicycle. Taylor won the race riding Munger's "Birdie Special" bicycle and beat Bald by 20 yards (18 m) in a sprint to the finish.

From December 6–12, 1896, Taylor participated as one of 28 competitors in the six-day event. Although Taylor had just become a professional, he had achieved enough notoriety, possibly because of his stunning win on December 5, to be listed among the "American contestants" that also included A.A. Hansen (the Minneapolis "rainmaker") and Teddy Goodman. In addition, many "experts from abroad" participated in the meet such as Switzerland's Albert Schock, Germany's Frank J. Waller, Frank Forster, and Ed von Hoeg, and Canada's Burns W. Pierce. Several countries, including Scotland, Wales, France, England, and Denmark, were represented in the event.

As the fascination with six-day races spread from its origins in the United Kingdom across the Atlantic, their appeal to base instincts was attracting large crowds. The more spectators who paid at the gate, the bigger the prizes, which provided riders with the incentive to stay awake–or be kept awake–in order to ride the greatest distance. To prepare for the event, Taylor went to Brooklyn, where he became a member of the South Brooklyn Wheelmen. An estimated crowd of 6,000 spectators attended the final day of the Madison Square Garden races in December 1896. During these long, grueling races, riders suffered delusions and hallucinations, which may have been caused by exhaustion, lack of sleep, or perhaps use of drugs. (Note: The extent of drug use during the era in which Taylor raced is "uncertain," but it was "not uncommon." At that time, many narcotics and pharmaceutical drugs, including opium, laudanum, morphine, heroin, and cocaine, among others, could be obtained legally. Their exhaustion was countered by soigneurs (French: carers), helpers akin to seconds in boxing. Nitroglycerine, a drug used to stimulate the heart after cardiac attacks and was credited with improving riders' breathing, was also among the treatments supplied to riders.)

Madison Square Garden's six-day event in 1896 was the longest race Taylor had ever entered. On the final day of the long-distance competition, he refused to continue racing, exhausted from physical exertion and lack of sleep; a Bearnings reporter overheard him comment: "I cannot go on with safety, for there is a man chasing me around the ring with a knife in his hand." Nonetheless, Taylor completed a total of 1,732 miles (2,787 km) in 142 hours of racing to finish in eighth place. Teddy Hale, the race winner, completed 1,910 miles (3,070 km) and took home $5,000 in prize money. Taylor never competed in another race that long.

After Taylor's move to the East Coast in 1896, he initially lived in Worcester, where he worked for Munger, and in Middletown, the site of another of Munger's cycle factories. Taylor also lived in other eastern cities, such as South Brooklyn, where he once had trained, but it is not known how long he still resided in New York after he became a professional racer.

=== 1897–1898: Fame and records ===
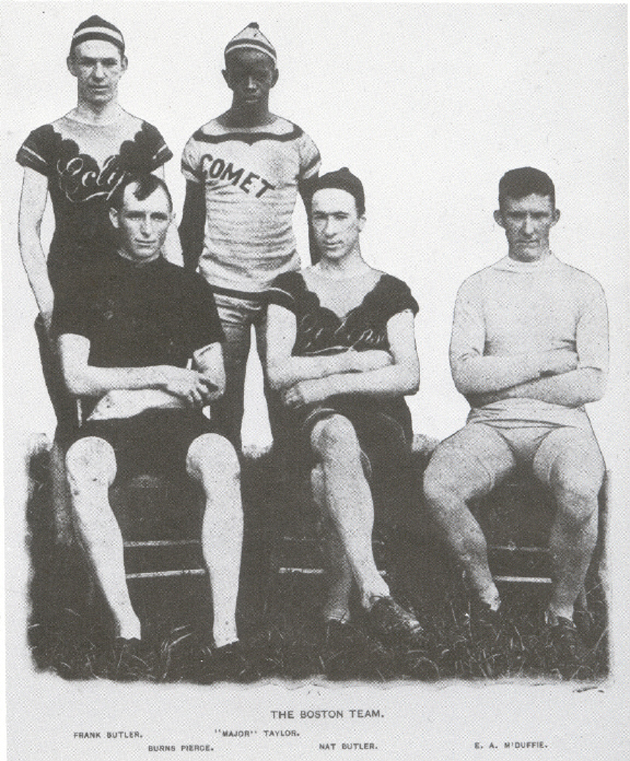
Taylor with the Boston pursuit team of 1897; one of the first known photographs of an integrated American professional sports team

Taylor initially raced for Munger's Worcester Cycle Manufacturing Company. After the company went into receivership in 1897 he joined other racing teams. 1897 was the first full year in which Taylor competed on the professional racing circuit. Early in the season, at the Bostonian Cycle Club's "Blue Ribbon Meet" on May 19, 1897, Taylor rode a Comet bicycle to win first place in the one-mile open professional race. On June 26, he won a quarter-mile (402 m) race at the track at Manhattan Beach, Brooklyn. Taylor also beat Eddie Bald in a one-mile race in Reading, Pennsylvania, but finished fourth in the prestigious LAW convention in Philadelphia.

As a professional racer, Taylor continued to experience racial prejudice as a black cyclist in a white-dominated sport. In November and December 1897, when the circuit extended to the racially-segregated South, local race promoters refused to let Taylor compete because he was black. Taylor returned to Massachusetts for the remainder of the season and Eddie Bald became the American sprint champion in 1897. Despite the obstacles, Taylor was determined to race.

Yet, in the early years of his professional racing career, as he competed in and won more races, Taylor's reputation continued to increase. Newspapers began referring to him as the "Worcester Whirlwind," the "Black Cyclone," the "Ebony Flyer," the "Colored Cyclone," and the "Black Zimmerman," among other nicknames. He also gained popularity among the spectators. One of his fans was President Theodore Roosevelt, who kept track of Taylor throughout Taylor's seventeen-year racing career.

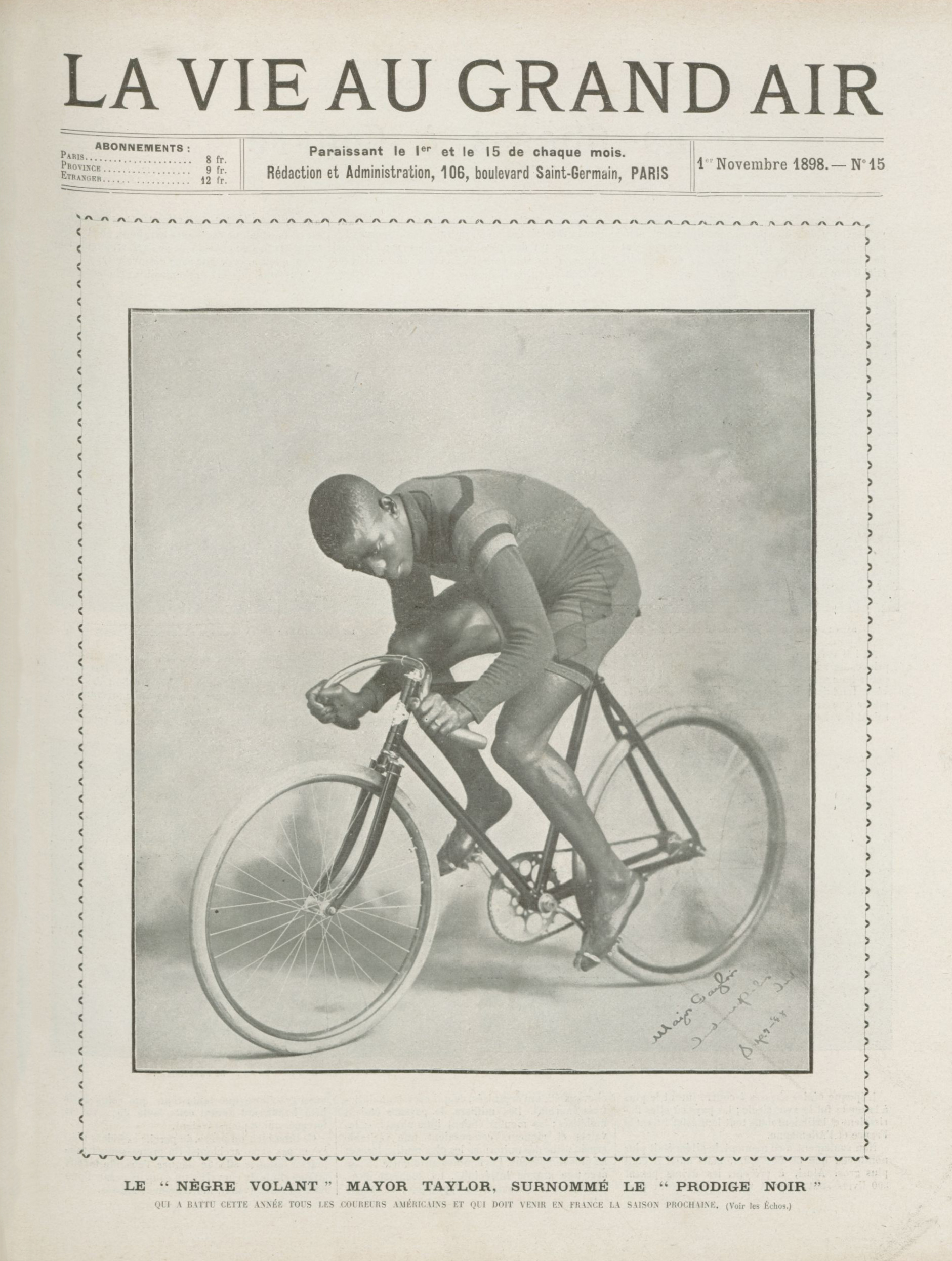
Taylor on the front of the November 1, 1898, edition of the French sports magazine La Vie au grand air

Early in the 1898 racing season Taylor beat Bald at Manhattan Beach, Brooklyn, New York. On June 17 at the Charles River Track in Cambridge, Massachusetts, in a 30-mile (48 km) fast-paced race, he lost to Eddie McDuffie, both of whom were on the same team and racing Orient Bicycles manufactured by the Waltham Manuracturing Company. One bicycle model and iinnovation that company owner Charles Metz developed was nicknamed the "Major Taylor," which featured a drop-down handlebar, a bar extension and a smaller wheel.

On July 17 at Philadelphia, Taylor won his biggest victories of the season: first place in the one-mile championship and second place in the one-mile handicap races. On August 27, in a head-to-head race with Jimmy Michael of Wales, Taylor set a new world record of 1:41 2/5 for a one-mile paced match and beat the Welsh racer to the finish by 20 yards (18 m).

Taylor was among several top cyclists who could claim the national championship in 1898; however, scoring variations and the formation of a new cycling league that year "clouded" his claim to the title. Early in the year a group of professional racers that included Taylor had left the LAW to join a rival group, the American Racing Cyclists' Union (ARCU), and its professional racing group, the National Cycling Association (NCA). During the ARCU sprint championship in St. Louis and Cape Girardeau, Missouri, Taylor, who was a devout Baptist, refused to compete for religious reasons in the finals of the championship races because they were held on a Sunday. As a result of Taylor's decision not to race in the finals at Cape Girardeau, the ARCU suspended him from membership. Taylor petitioned the LAW for reinstatement in 1898 and was accepted, but Tom Butler, who had remained a LAW member after the break-up, was declared the League's champion that year. (Note: Earl Kiser, nicknamed the "Little Dayton Demon," raced for the Stearns "Yellow Fellow" team during the same era as Taylor. Kiser became a two-time world cycling champion and competed all across Europe in the late 1890s. After Taylor was barred from racing, Kiser petitioned the ARCU to have him included.)

During 1898–99, at the peak of his cycling career, Taylor established seven world records; the quarter-mile, the one-third-mile (531 m), the half-mile, the two-thirds-mile (1.1 km), the three-quarters-mile (1.2 km), the one-mile, and the two-mile (3.2 km) distances. His one-mile world record of 1:41 from a standing start stood for 28 years.

=== 1899: World sprint champion ===
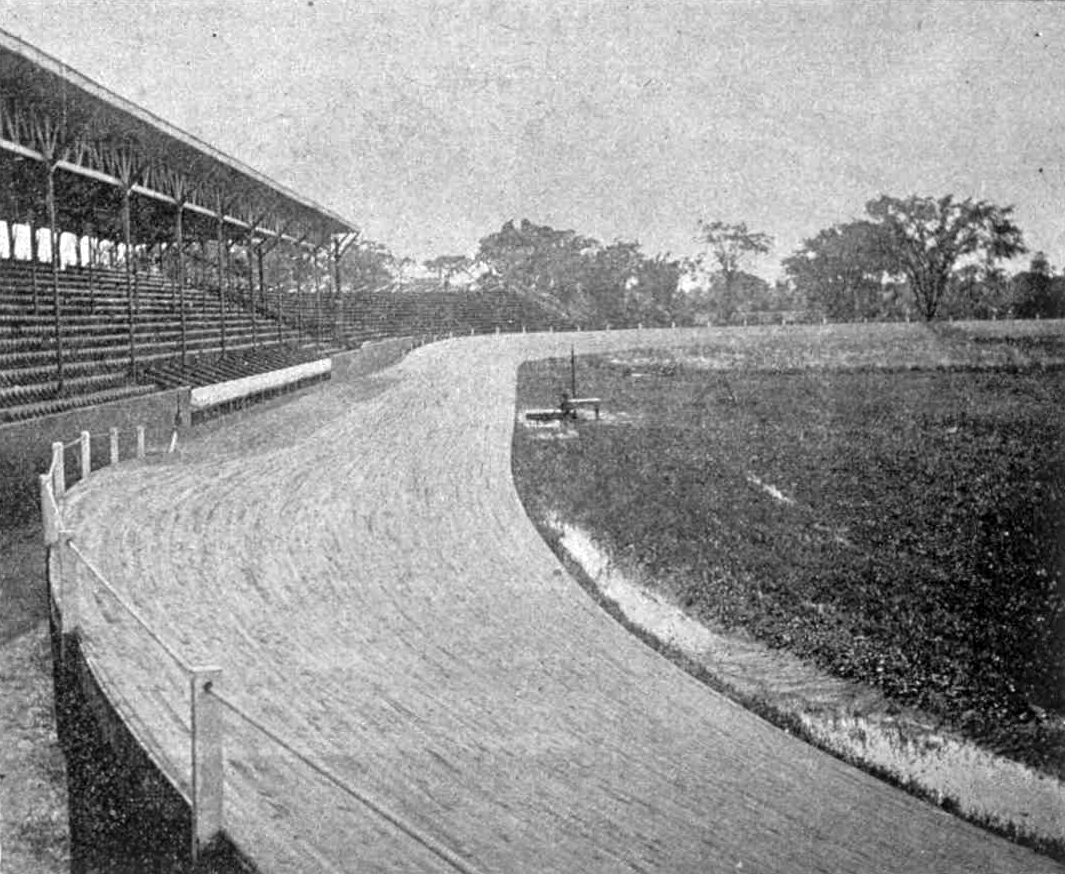
Taylor became the first Black American to win a world championship in any sport at the 1899 track world championships at the Vélodrome de Queen's Park in Montreal, Canada.

At the 1899 world championships in Montreal, Canada, Major Taylor won the one-mile sprint, to become the first African American to win a world championship in cycling. He was the second black athlete, after Canadian bantamweight boxer George Dixon of Boston, to win a world championship in any sport. For decades he was the only black athlete to be a world champion in cycling. Taylor won the one-mile world championship sprint in a close finish a few feet ahead of Frenchman Courbe d'Outrelon and American Tom Butler. In addition, Taylor placed second in the two-mile championship sprint at Montreal behind Charles McCarthy and won the half-mile championship race. Because the finals were held on Sundays, when Taylor refused to compete for religious reasons, he did not compete in another world championship contest until 1909 in Copenhagen, Denmark. Taylor lost in a preliminary heat at Copenhagen and did not compete in the finals.

After Major Taylor's 1899 world championship win, many claimed that the event "had been a farce, because Taylor had not competed against the strongest riders." World cycling's governing body, the International Cycling Association (replaced with the Union Cycliste Internationale (UCI) in 1900), did not allow NCA racers to compete at the world championships in Montreal. As a result, Taylor's accomplishments were somewhat diminished. Because the rival organizations (LAW and the NCA) would not recognize each other, two American champions were crowned in 1899. Tom Cooper was the NCA champion and Taylor was the LAW champion.

In addition to the world championship wins in the one-mile and two-mile distances at Montreal and the LAW Championship, which he won on points, Taylor's victories in 1899 included twenty-two first-place finishes in major championship races around the U.S. Taylor's record-setting times were impossible to dismiss. No other rider had matched the "range and variety" of his winning performances, which made him an international celebrity. In 1899, Taylor made several unsuccessful attempts to recapture his world record for a one-mile paced distance in two "strenuous record-breaking campaigns," before he finally achieved the new world record of 1:19 in November to regain the title of "the fastest man in the world."

For the 1899 racing season, Major Taylor went to Syracuse and with Munger's assistance he signed a contract to race for the E. C. Stearns Company. Taylor, Munger, and Harry Sager, who was Taylor's bicycle parts sponsor, initially planned to negotiate a deal with the Olive Wheel Company; however, the men were able to work out a more lucrative contract with Stearns, who agreed to build Taylor's bicycles using a chainless gear mechanism that Sanger had designed. The bicycles only weighed about 20 pounds (9.1 kg) and had an 88-inch (2,200 mm) gear for sprinting and a 120-inch (3,000 mm) gear for longer, paced runs. Stearns "also agreed to build Taylor a revolutionary steam-powered pacing tandem, behind which he could attack world records and challenge the leading exponents of paced racing." Although the tandem was temperamental, it helped Taylor break his former teammate and competitor Eddie McDuffie's one-mile world record on November 15, 1899, with a time of 1:19 at a speed of 45.56 mph (73.32 km/h). In late 1899, Taylor signed a contract to race with the Iver Johnson's Arms & Cycle Works team of Fitchburg, Massachusetts, during the 1900 racing season.

=== 1900: American sprint champion ===
In 1900, when the LAW no longer governed professional bicycle races in the U.S., Taylor's future as a professional racer was in jeopardy. Fortunately, the ARCU and the NCA, who had banned Taylor from competing in their leagues, readmitted him after payment of a $500 fine. Taylor won the American sprint championship on points in 1900. He also beat Tom Cooper, the 1899 NCA champion, in a head-to-head match in a one-mile race at Madison Square Garden in front of 50,000 to 60,000 spectators. In addition, Taylor set world records in the half-mile and two-thirds-mile sprints and raced indoors using a "home trainer" in head-to-head competitions with other riders as a vaudeville act. Taylor eventually settled in Worcester, where, in 1900, he purchased a home on Hobson Street.

=== 1901–1904: Europe and Australia ===
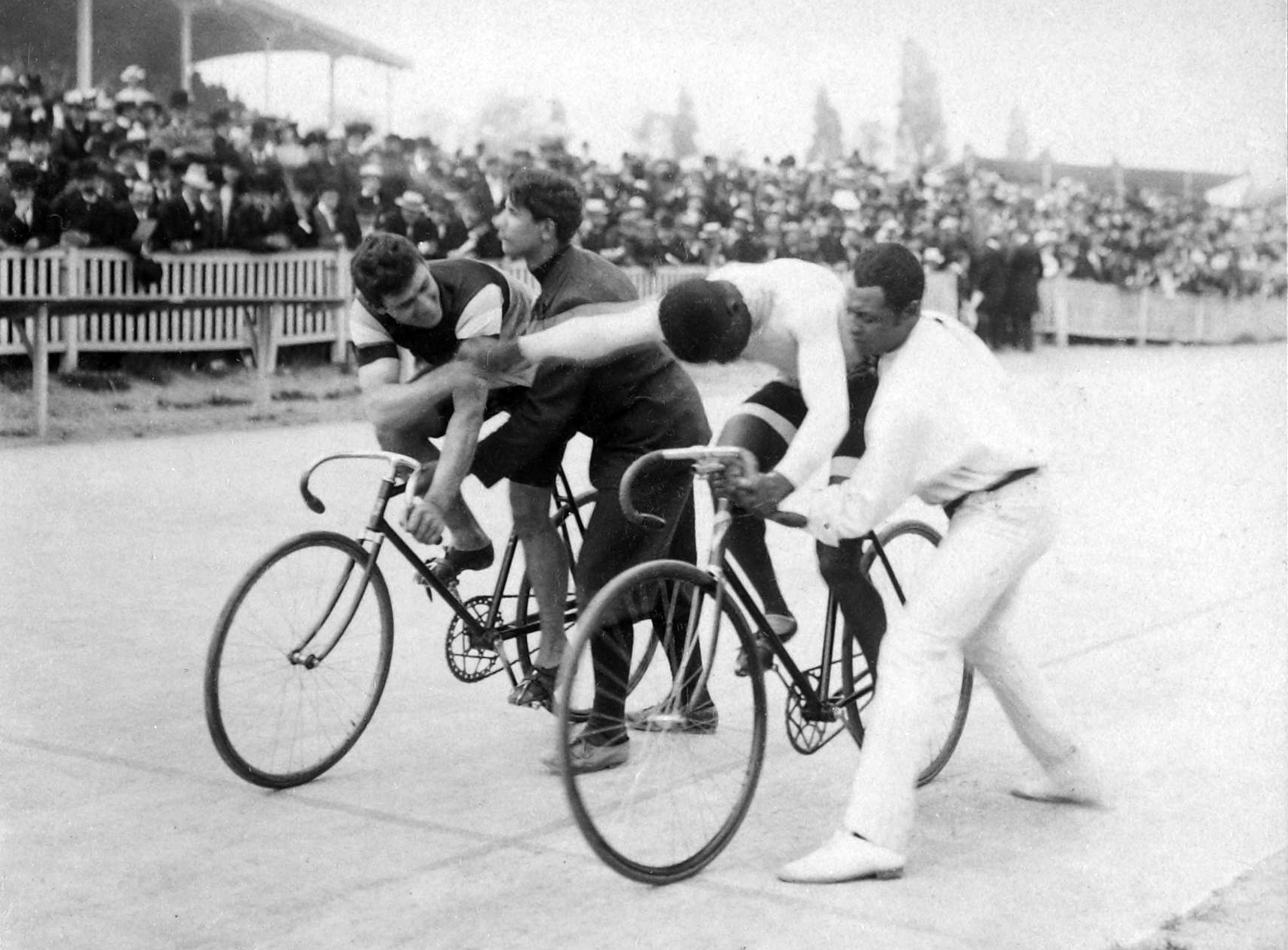
Taylor racing against Edmond Jacquelin at Paris' Parc des Princes in 1901

Following his record-setting successes in the U.S. and Canada, Taylor agreed to a European tour. In 1901, Taylor made his first trip to Europe, but returned to compete in the U.S. after the conclusion of the European spring racing season. During his European tour Taylor still refused to race on Sundays, when most of the finals were held, because of his religious convictions. It was reported that Taylor took a Bible with him when he travelled and began each race with a silent prayer because of his religious beliefs.

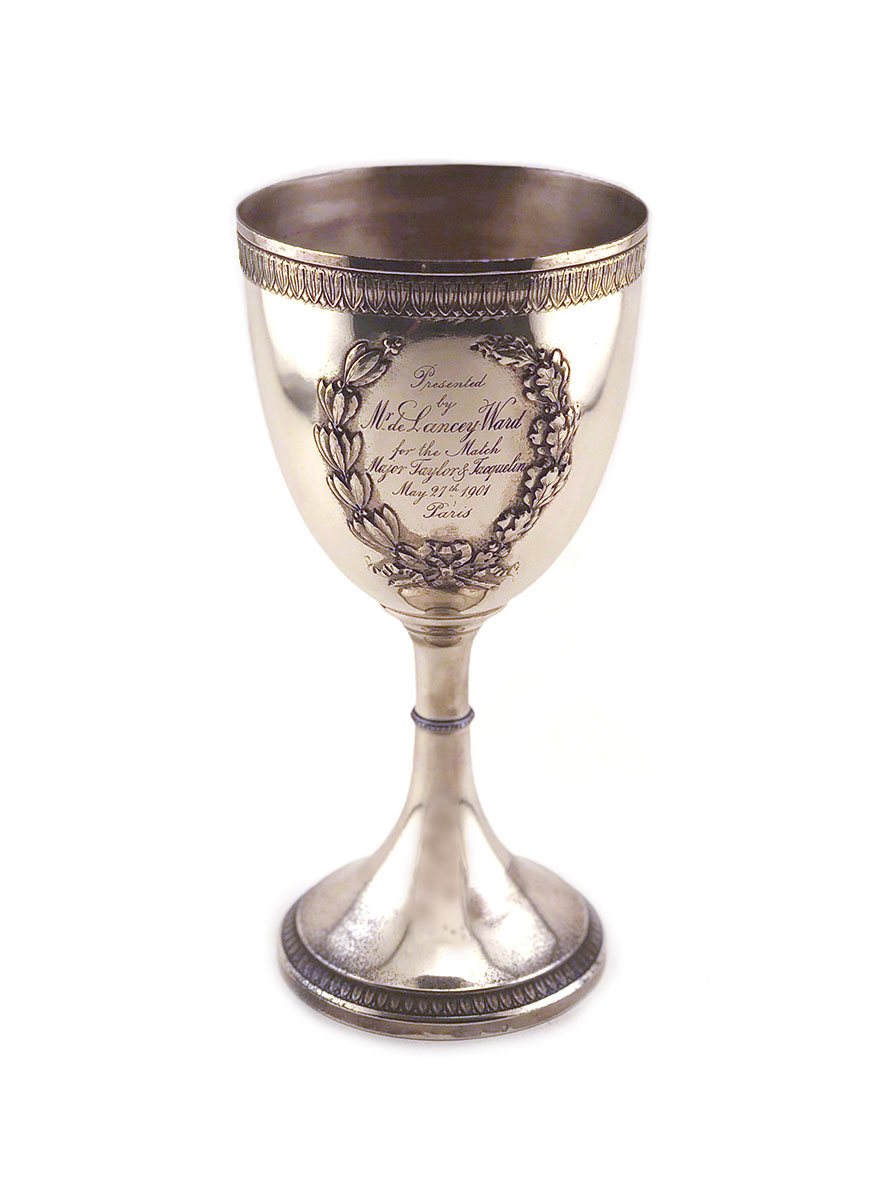
Trophy presented to Major Taylor at Parc des Princes, Paris on May 27, 1901, in the Indiana State Museum and Historic Sites Collection

Taylor was popular among the European race fans and news reporters: "Everywhere he went he was mobbed, talked about, or written up." In 1901, Taylor won 18 of the 24 European races he entered, notching up 42 victories when the individual heats are counted. A highlight of Taylor's European tour in 1901 was the two match races with French champion Edmond Jacquelin at the Parc des Princes in Paris, the winner in each decided over the best of three heats. Jacquelin won the first match, on May 16, two heats to nil, a wheel length sealing the win in the first heat, two lengths the gap in the second. Taylor triumphed in the second match, on May 27, two heats to nil, four lengths his margin of victory in the first heat, three the gap in the second.

Major Taylor also participated in a European tour in 1902, when he entered 57 races and won 40 of them to defeat the champions of Germany, England, and France. In addition to racing in Europe, Taylor also competed in Australia and New Zealand in 1903 and 1904. In February 1903, for example, Taylor, lured by a £1,200 appearance fee and a world record 1st prize of £750, competed in the inaugural Sydney Thousand handicap. His fee the next year hit £2,000. During his world tour in 1903, Taylor earned prize money estimated at $35,000 ($923,352 in 2015 chained dollars).

=== 1907–1910: Later years ===
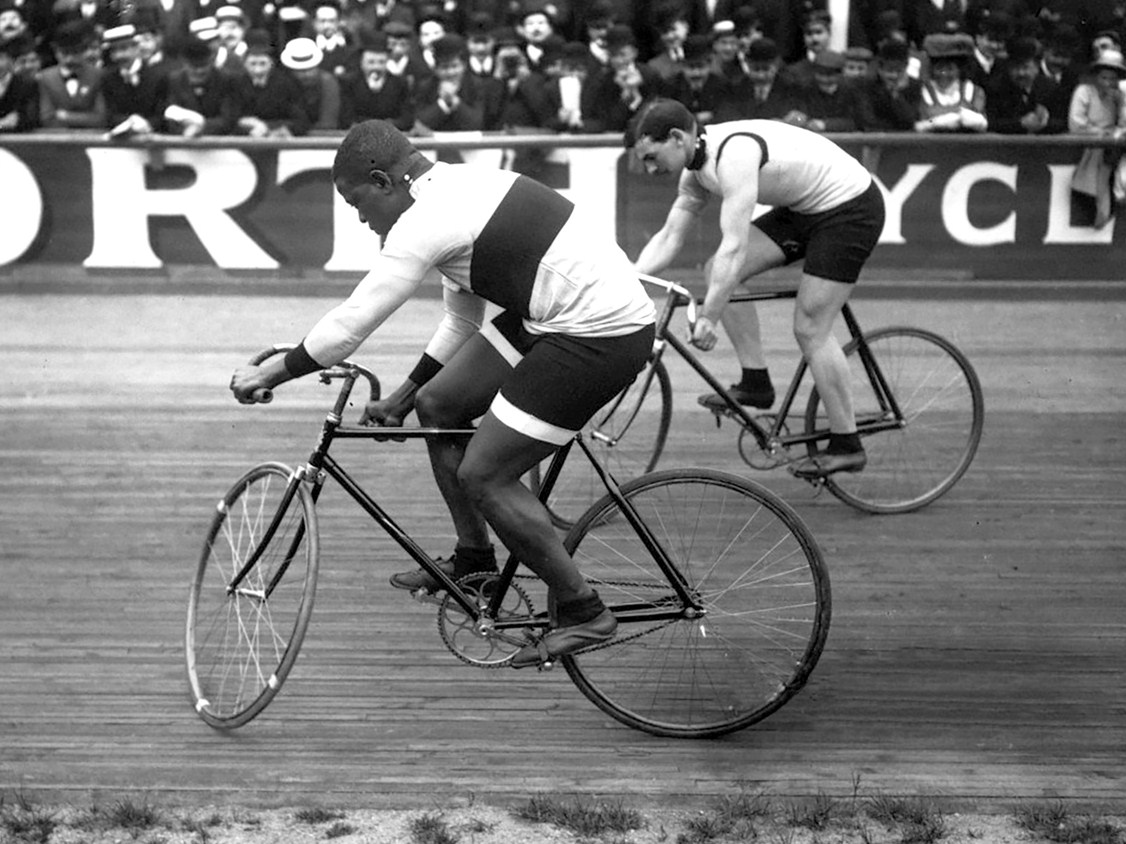
Taylor and Léon Hourlier at a standstill during a race at Paris' Vélodrome Buffalo in 1909

Following a collapse from the mental and physical strain of professional competition, Taylor took a 2 1/2-year hiatus from cycling between 1904 and 1906, before returning to race in France. He set two world records in Paris in 1907 for the half-mile standing start at 0:42 1/5 and the quarter-mile standing start at 0:25 2/5. Taylor also returned to Europe for the racing season in 1908 and in 1909. He finally broke his long-standing decision to avoid Sunday races in 1909 when he was nearing the end of his racing career.

Taylor's last professional race took place on October 10, 1909, in Roanne, France, in a match race against French world champion Charles Dupré. Taylor won the race, but he did not return to Europe for the 1910 season and retired from competitive cycling.

Taylor was still breaking records in 1908, but his age was starting to "creep up on him." He retired from racing in 1910 at the age of 32. When Taylor returned to his home in Worcester at the end of his racing career, his estimated net worth was $75,000 ($1,978,611 in 2015 chained dollars) to $100,000 ($2,638,148 in 2015 chained dollars). Taylor won his final competition, an "old-timers race" among former professional racers, in New Jersey in September 1917.

== Racism in cycling ==
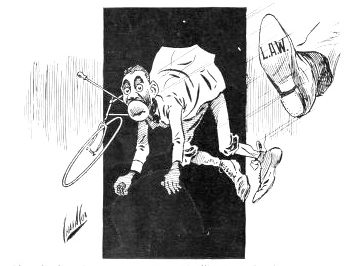
A caricature published in the edition of February 23, 1894, of The Bearings cycling magazine, illustrating the ban of blacks from membership to the League of American Wheelmen

As Taylor gained fame as an amateur then as a professional, he did not escape racial segregation. In 1894, the League of American Wheelmen changed its bylaws to exclude blacks from membership; however, it did permit them to compete in its races. Although Taylor's cycling was greatly celebrated abroad, particularly in France, his career was still restricted by racism, particularly in the Southern U.S., where some local promoters would not permit him to compete against white cyclists. Some restaurants and hotels also refused to serve him or provide him lodging.

Taylor asserted in his autobiography that prominent bicycle racers of his era often cooperated to defeat him; the Butler brothers (Nat and Tom), for example, were accused of so doing in the one-mile world championship race at Montreal in 1899. At the LAW races in Boston, shortly after Taylor had won the world championship, he accused the entire field, that included Tom Cooper and Eddie Bald among others, of fouling him. Taylor complained after the event that he had been "bumped, jostled, and elbowed until I was sorely tried." Racing promoter William A. Brady, who was also Taylor's manager, chastised the other riders for their "rough treatment" of Taylor during the race.

While some of Taylor's fellow racers refused to compete with him, others resorted to intimidation, verbal insults, and threats to physically harm him. While racing in Savannah, Georgia in the Winter of 1898, he received a written threat saying "Clear out if you value your life;" the previous day, Taylor had challenged three riders together to a race after one of them had said they "didn't pace niggers." Taylor recalled that ice water had been thrown at him during races and nails were scattered in front of his wheels. Taylor further stated in his autobiography that he had been elbowed and "pocketed" (boxed in) by other riders to prevent him from sprinting to the front of the pack, a tactic at which he was so successful.

Taylor's competitors also tried to injure him. One incident occurred on September 23, 1897, after the one-mile Massachusetts Open race at Taunton. At the conclusion of the race, William Becker, who placed third behind Taylor in second place, tackled Taylor on the race track and choked him into unconsciousness. Becker, who claimed that Taylor had crowded him during the race, was temporarily suspended while the incident was investigated. Becker received a $50 fine as punishment for his actions but was reinstated and allowed to continue racing. In another incident, which occurred in February 1904 when Taylor was competing in Australia, he was seriously injured on the final turn of a race when his fellow competitor Iver Lawson veered his bicycle toward him and collided with his front wheel. Taylor crashed and lay unconscious on the track before he was taken to a local hospital; he later made a full recovery. Lawson, as a result of his actions, was suspended from racing anywhere in the world for a year.

Life is too short for any man to hold bitterness in his heart and that is why I have no feeling against anybody.

— Marshall Taylor

Taylor explained that he included details of these incidents in his autobiography, along with his comments about his experiences, to serve as an inspiration for other African American athletes trying to overcome racial prejudice and discriminatory treatment in sports. Taylor cited exhaustion as well as the physical and mental strain caused by the racial prejudice he experienced on and off the track as his reasons for retiring from competitive cycling in 1910. His advice to African American youths wishing to emulate him straightforward was that although bicycle racing had been the appropriate route to success for him, he would not recommend it in general. He suggested that individuals "practice clean living, fair play and good sportsmanship" and develop their best talent with a strong character, significant willpower, and "physical courage." Despite many obstacles, Taylor rose to the top of his sport and became "one of the dominant athletes of his era."

== Retirement and death ==
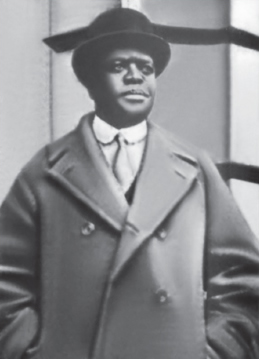
Taylor in 1926, aged 47–48

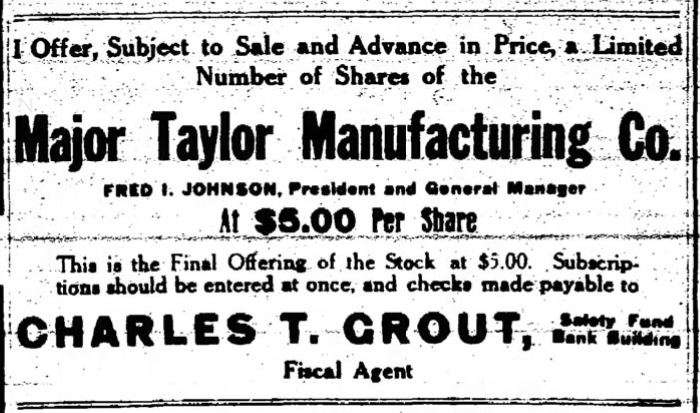
1914 newspaper ad offering shares of the Major Taylor Manufacturing Company

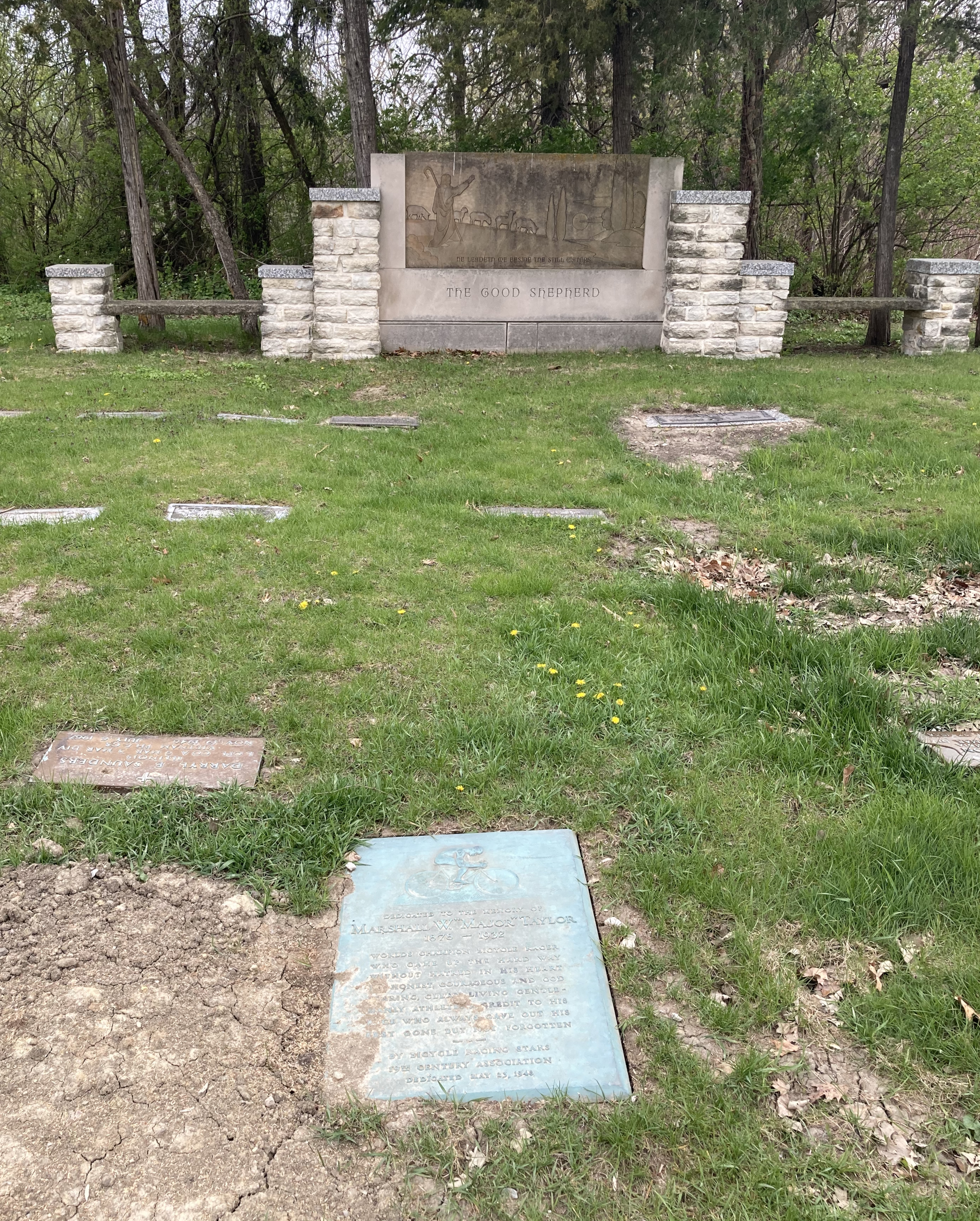
Taylor's grave at Mount Glenwood Memory Gardens South

After retiring from competition, Major Taylor applied to Worcester Polytechnic Institute to study engineering although he did not have a high school diploma, but he was denied admission and took up various business ventures.

Nearly 20 years after his retirement, Taylor wrote and self-published his autobiography, The Fastest Bicycle Rider in the World: The Story of a Colored Boy's Indomitable Courage and Success Against Great Odds: An Autobiography (1928). (Note: The original version of Taylor's autobiography, printed by The Commonwealth Press in Worcester, Massachusetts, has a copyright date of 1928; however, other sources indicate that it was not published until 1929.) According to his book, Taylor was upbeat about his retirement: "I felt I had my day, and a wonderful day it was too." Taylor also claimed he had no regrets and "no animosity toward any man," but his autobiography included hints of bitterness in regard to his treatment as a competitor: "I always played the game fairly and tried my hardest, although I was not always given a square deal or anything like it."

By 1930, Taylor had experienced severe financial difficulties from bad investments (including self-publishing his autobiography), the stock market crash, and businesses that proved unsuccessful. Taylor's home in Worcester and some of the family's personal property were sold to pay off debts. He also suffered from persistent ill health in his later years.

Little is known of Taylor's life after the failure of his marriage and his move to Chicago around 1930. Taylor spent the final two years of his life in poverty, selling copies of his autobiography to earn a meagre income and residing at YMCA Hotel in Chicago's Bronzeville neighborhood.

In March 1932, Taylor suffered a heart attack and was hospitalized in the Provident Hospital. After an unsuccessful heart operation, he was moved to Cook County Hospital's charity ward in April, where he died on June 21, at age 53. The official cause on his death certificate is "nephrosclerosis and hypertension," contributed by "Chronic myocarditis." His wife and daughter, who survived him, did not immediately learn of his death and no one claimed his remains. He was initially buried at Mount Glenwood Cemetery in Thornton Township, Cook County, near Chicago, in an unmarked pauper's grave. In 1948, a group of former professional bicycle racers used funds donated by Frank W. Schwinn, owner of the Schwinn Bicycle Co. at that time, to organize the exhumation and reburial of Taylor's remains in a more prominent location at the cemetery. The plaque at the grave reads: "World's champion bicycle racer who came up the hard way without hatred in his heart, an honest, courageous and God-fearing, clean-living gentlemanly athlete. A credit to his race who always gave out his best. Gone but not forgotten."

== Legacy ==
Major Taylor's legacy lies in his willingness to challenge racial prejudice as an African American athlete in the white-dominated sport of cycling. He was also hailed as a sports hero in France and Australia. Taylor, who became a role model for other athletes facing racial prejudice and discrimination, was "the first great black celebrity athlete" and a pioneer in his efforts to challenge segregation in sports. He also paved the way for others facing similar circumstances. Taylor explained in his autobiography that he had no other African Americans to offer him advice and "therefore had to blaze my own trail."

An image by Kadir Nelson of Major Taylor racing down a tree-lined street with bicyclists from the past and the present trying to keep up behind him was the illustrated cover and cover story of the "New Yorker" magazine online edition of May 26, 2025 and print edition of June 2, 2025.

=== Honors and tributes ===
Honors and tributes

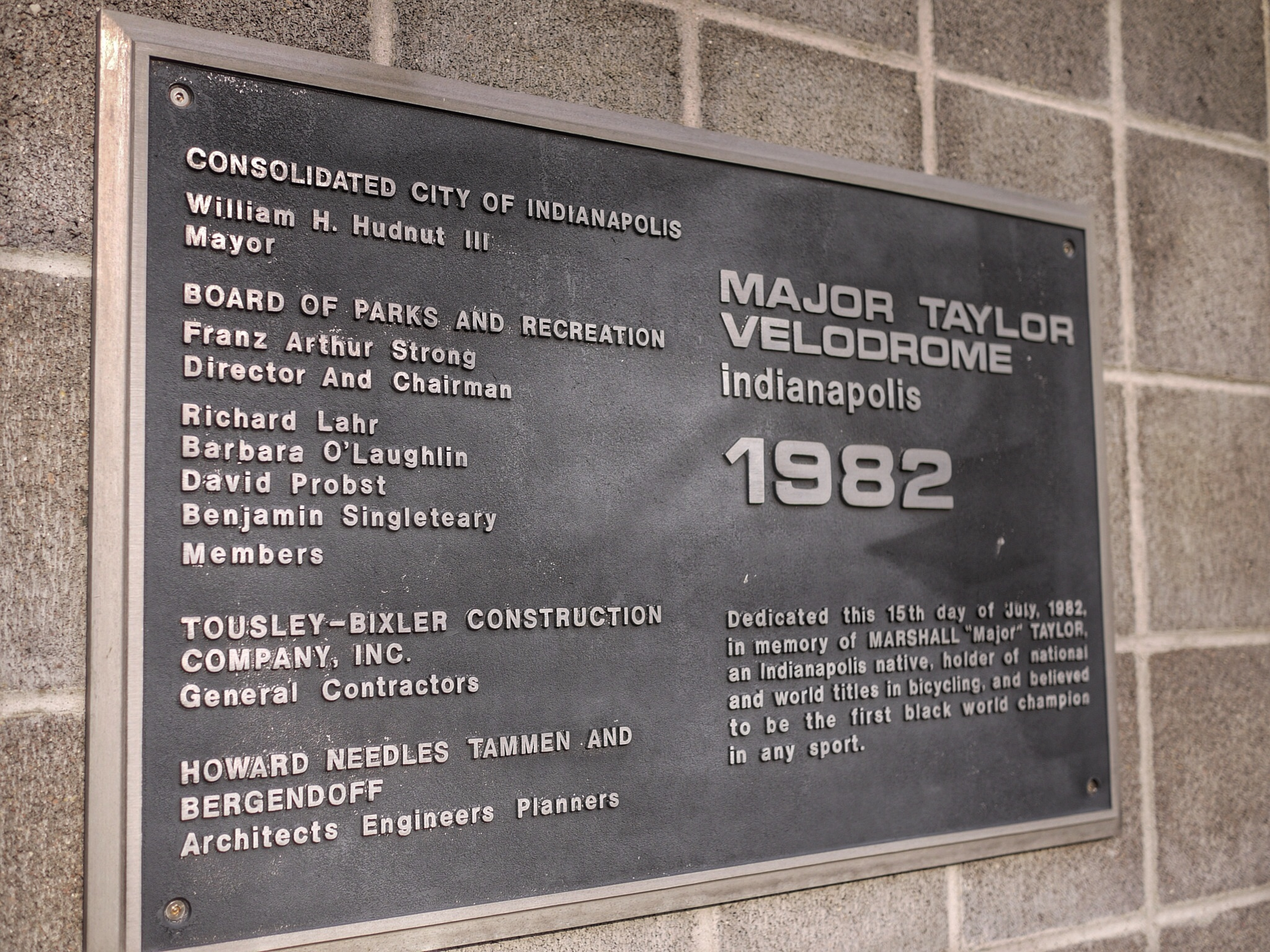
A plaque commemorating the 1982 dedication of the Major Taylor Velodrome in Indianapolis, Indiana

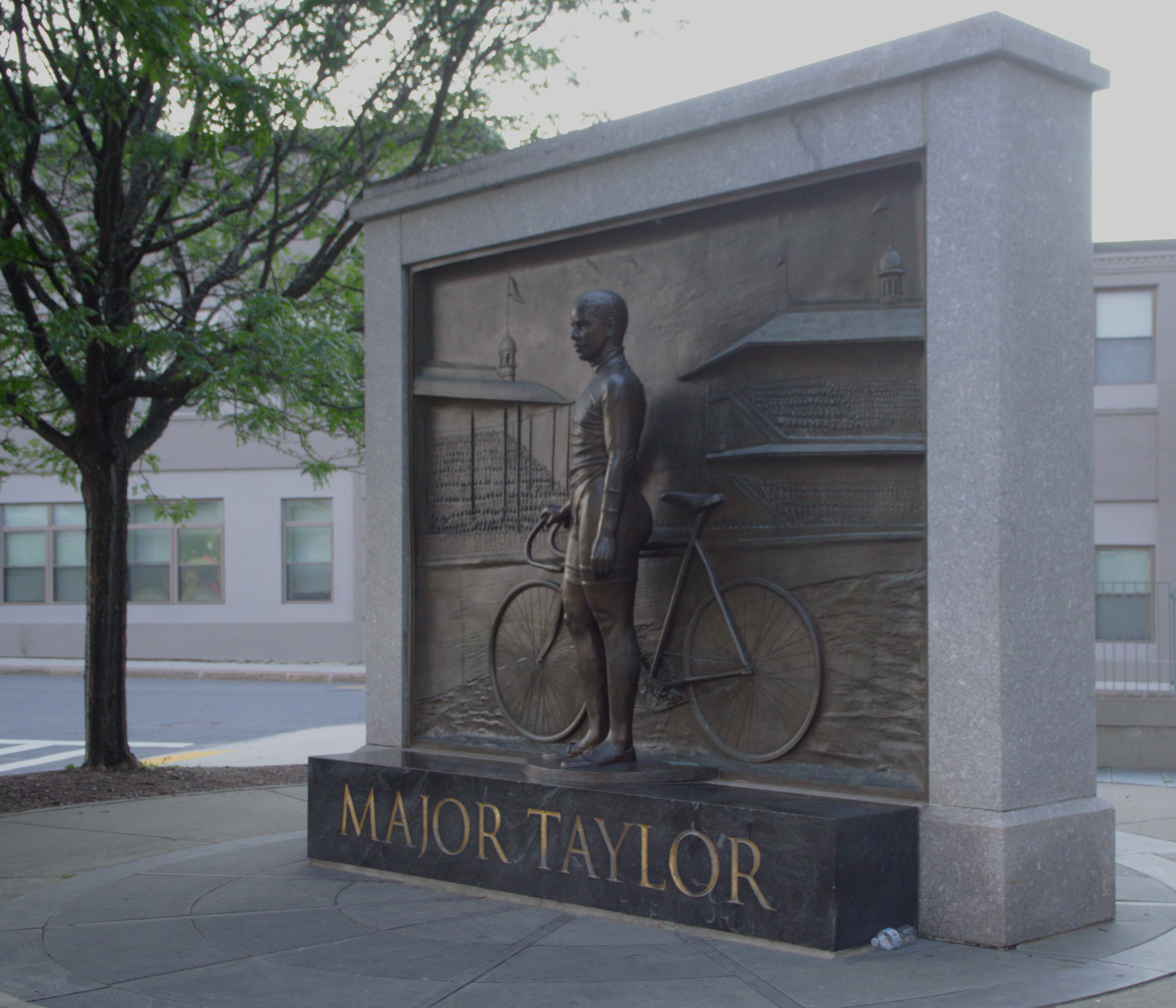
Memorial to Taylor outside the Worcester Public Library

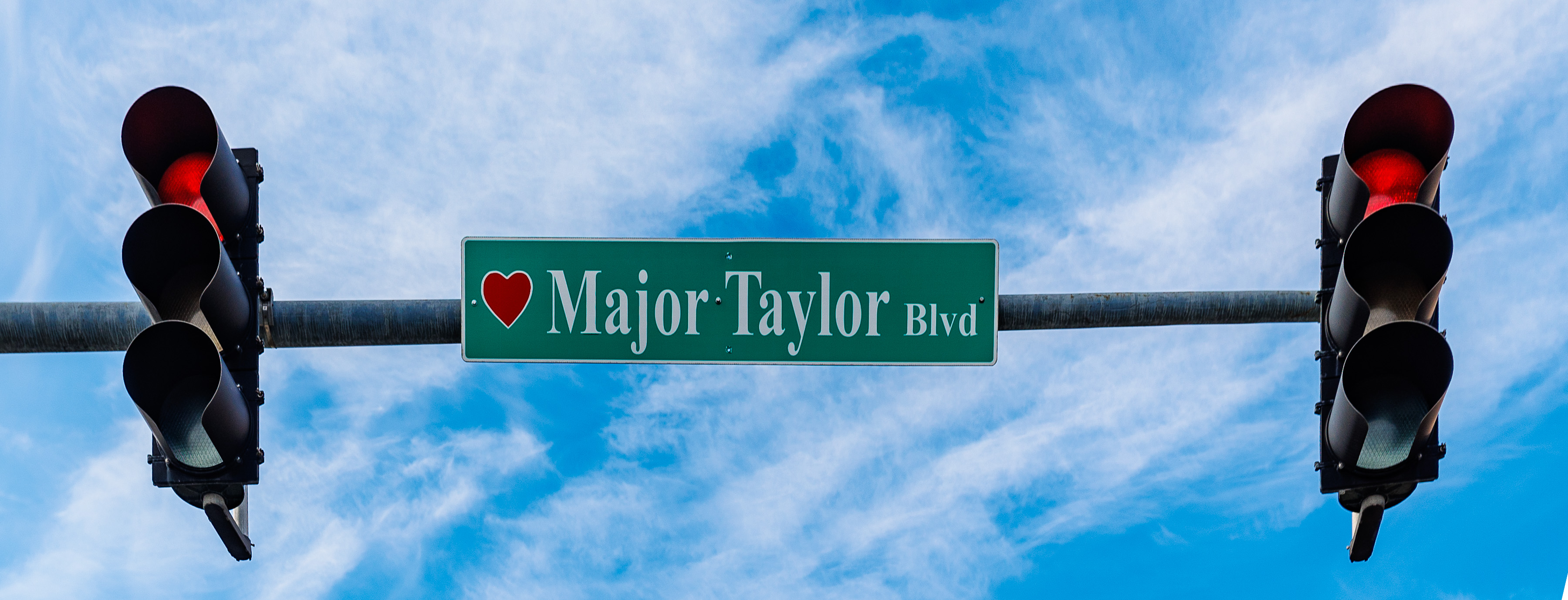
Major Taylor Boulevard in Worcester

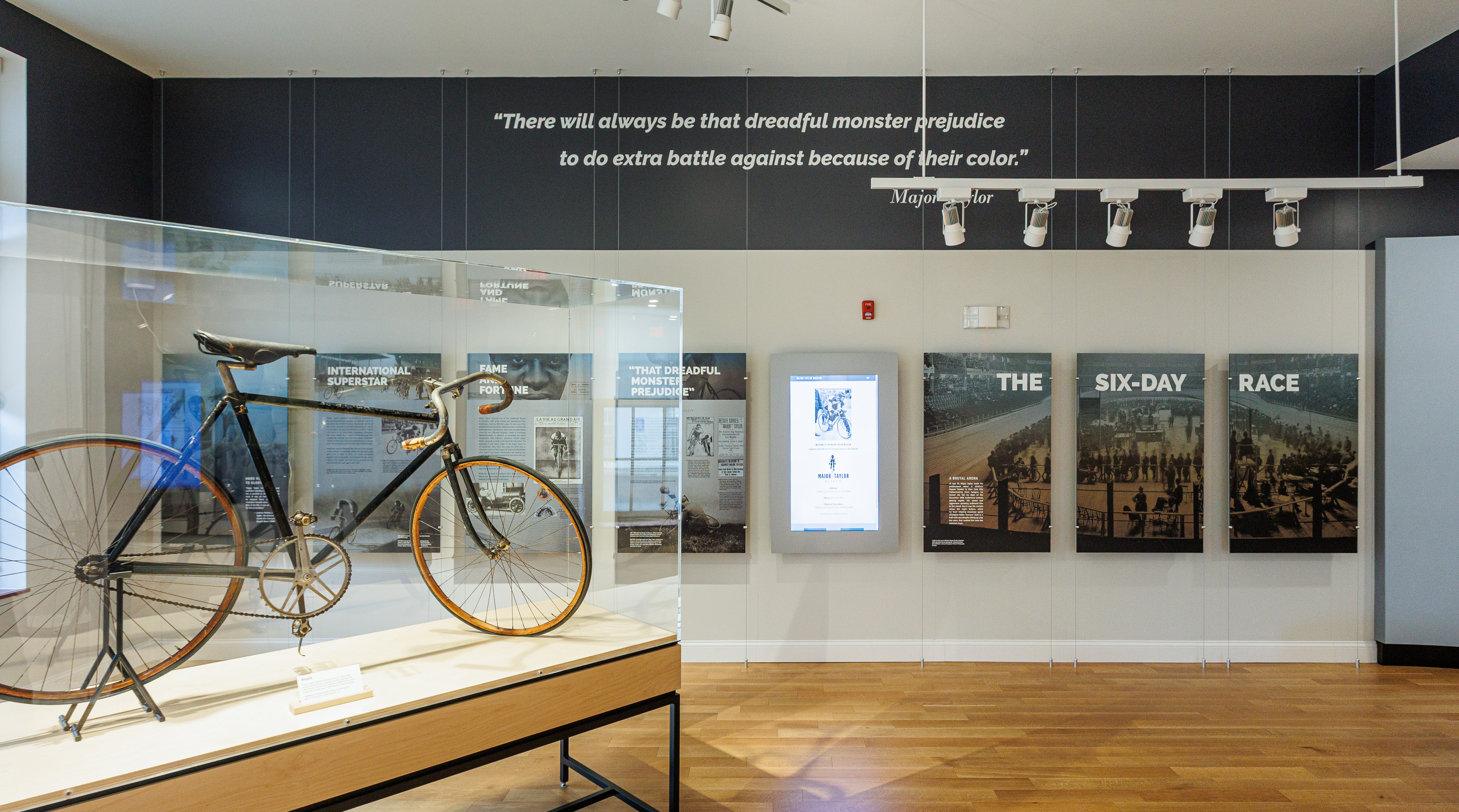
Major Taylor Museum in Worcester

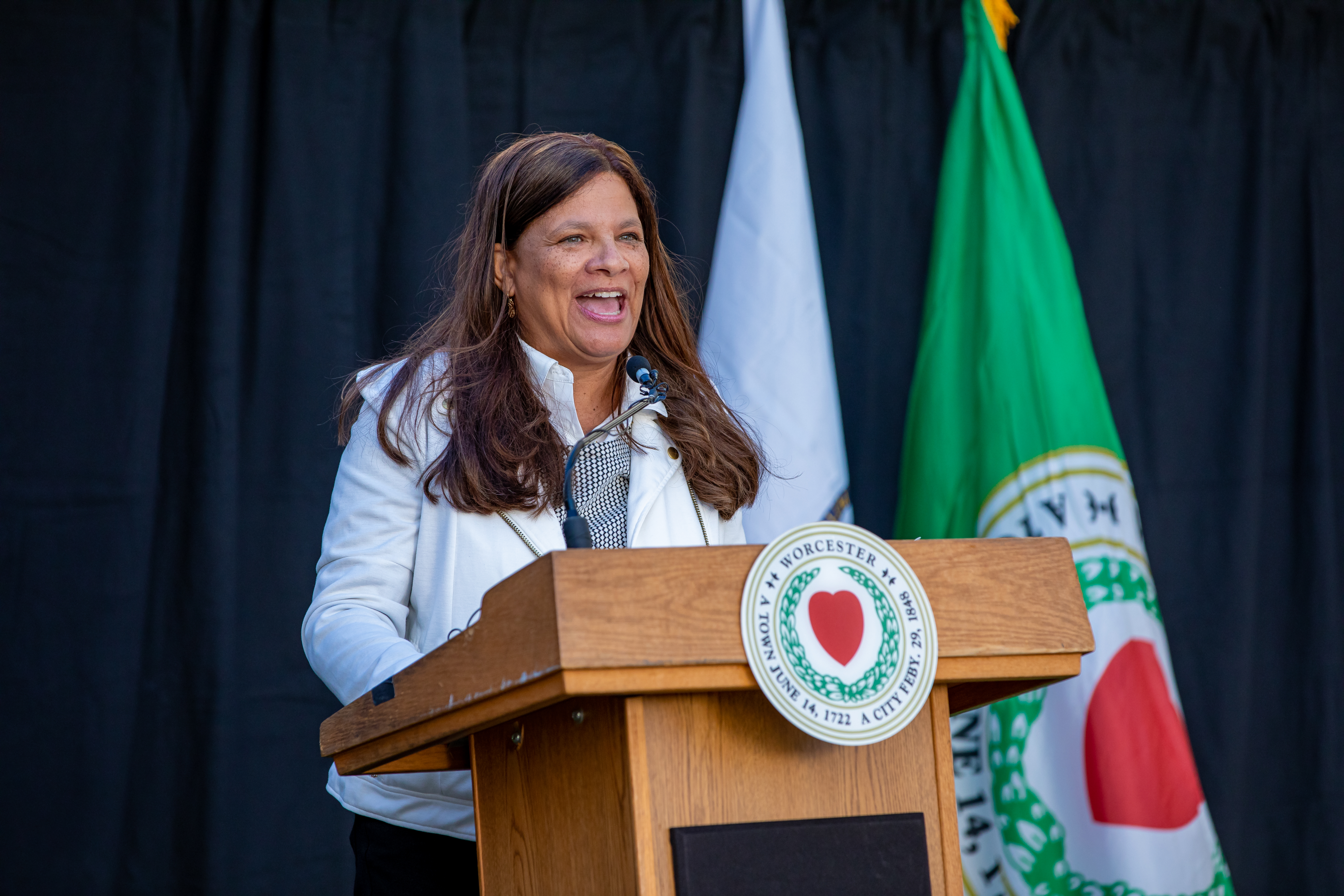
Karen Brown Donovan, great-granddaughter of Major Taylor, at the grand opening of the Major Taylor Museum in Worcester (2021).

Taylor's legacy remained largely unknown until 1982, when the Major Taylor Velodrome in Indianapolis opened for the city's hosting of the U.S. Olympic Festival. Annual events taking place in the velodrome or the wider Indy Cycloplex include the Major Taylor Racing League track series, and from 2015, the Major Taylor Cross Cup second division UCI cyclo-cross event. Taylor was posthumously inducted into the U.S. Bicycling Hall of Fame in 1989. In 1996 and 1997, Taylor was posthumously awarded with the USA Cycling Korbel Lifetime Achievement Award and the Massachusetts Hall of Black Achievement, respectively. In 2002, he was one of the nine track cyclists inducted into the UCI Hall of Fame, created to commemorate 100 years of the Paris–Roubaix one-day road race and the inauguration of the World Cycling Centre. In 2003, he was named a Sports Ethics Fellow by the Institute for International Sport. During the 2005 UCI Track Cycling World Championships in Los Angeles, a Peugeot bicycle that Taylor had owned and then was donated to the U.S. Bicycling Hall of Fame, was put on display inside the ADT Event Center. In 2009, a state historical marker was installed as a tribute to Taylor near the Indiana State Fairgrounds in Indianapolis, where the Capital City track once stood, and where he had set an unofficial track record in 1896. In 2018, he was honored with a special tribute award at the International Athletic Association's Jesse Owens Awards held at the National Museum of African American History and Culture.

In 1998, in Taylor's adopted hometown of Worcester, MA, where he had lived for 35 years, the Major Taylor Association was formed by locals with the goal of erecting a permanent memorial to Taylor outside the Worcester Public Library and telling his story. On July 24, 2006, the city renamed the Worcester Center Boulevard, a high-traffic downtown street, to Major Taylor Boulevard. At the same time, funding for the memorial was secured with the Massachusetts Legislature approving $205,000, signed by governor Mitt Romney. The opening ceremony took place on May 21, 2008, attended by Tour de France winner Greg LeMond. The memorial features a bronze sculpture of Taylor surrounded by granite, created by Antonio Tobias Mendez, who was chosen from more than 60 others. At the grand opening of Worcester's Applebee's restaurant in 2000, Taylor was selected as its "hometown hero" and has a display of his memorabilia. In 2002, the Educational Association of Worcester and the Worcester Public Schools, together with the Major Taylor Association, developed a curriculum guide on Taylor, which has since been expanded and used in schools nationwide. Since 2003, Worcester has hosted the annual "George Street Bike Challenge for Major Taylor" amateur hillclimb event.

In 1979, the first of what came to be numerous cycling clubs across the country named in Taylor's honor was organized in Columbus, Ohio. In 2008, a number of these clubs joined with other African-American clubs to form the National Brotherhood of Cyclists (NBC), a nonprofit organization that aims to further diversity in cycling. The Major Taylor Trail, a six-mile-long (9.7 km) rail trail that navigates through South Side, Chicago, opened in 2007. Eleven years later, Chicagoan artist Bernard Williams oversaw the creation of a 400-foot-long (120 m) community mural honoring Taylor along the metal siding of the Little Calumet River bridge, which the trail crosses. Taylor is also celebrated along the Alum Creek Greenway Trail in Columbus, Ohio. In 2009, the Cascade Bicycle Club community organization of Washington state launched The Major Taylor Project, a youth cycling program.

A small museum devoted to Taylor opened in 2021 in the former Worcester County Courthouse. Taylor's great-granddaughter attended the dedication. A mural, painted by Shawn Michael Warren, was dedicated in Indianapolis, in September 2021, to honor his legacy.

The Charles River Museum of Industry and Innovation, in Waltham, MA, has several displays dedicated to Major Taylor and his rivalry with Eddie McDuffee, both of whom rode Orient Bicycles, manufactured by the Metz Waltham Manufacturing Company.

In Dec. 2023, U.S. Rep. Jim Baird of Indiana, (R) and U.S. Rep. Jonathan L. Jackson of Illinois, (D), spearheaded an effort to award the Congressional Gold Medal to Taylor. The measure was, co-sponsored by U.S. Rep. James P. McGovern, D-Worcester. (Status of that unknown.)

=== In popular culture ===
Actor Philip Morris portrayed Taylor in the 1992 television mini-series Tracks of Glory. Blues musician Otis Taylor (no relation) recorded "He Never Raced on Sunday," a song about Taylor for his 2004 album Double V. In 2007, Nike produced the Major Taylor "premium" collection of their most iconic sneakers in a light brown/neon yellow/white colorway. In the same year, SOMA Fabrications began making a set of bicycle handlebars called the Major Taylor Bar, which is a replica of 1930s drop handlebar that was named for Taylor. Dewshane Williams portrayed Taylor in the 2013 episode of television drama series Murdoch Mysteries, "Tour de Murdoch."

Major Taylor was used in a 2018-19 promotional campaign by the drinks brand Hennessy, part of a series focusing on "inspirational stories" of "culturally influential people". The campaign included TV commercials aired during the Super Bowl and the NBA Finals, featuring a voiceover from rapper Nas, as well as television documentary short The Six Day Race: The Story of Marshall "Major" Taylor; directed by Colin Barnicle, it features interviews with contemporary African-American athletes, road cyclist Ayesha McGowan and BMX rider Nigel Sylvester. Other parts of the campaign were a limited run replica track bicycle, a bronze sculpture of Taylor by Kadir Nelson and a series of tribute bicycle rides took place across the U.S. in November and December marking Taylor's birth date, and the creation of the $25,000 "MMT Higher Education Scholarship". Also in 2019, Taylor's name and likeness was licensed to Major Taylor Cycling Wear of Columbus Ohio to manufacture and distribute official sports- and cycling-wear bearing the image of Major Taylor.

Graphic novel publisher Drawn and Quarterly announced plans to publish a biography of Taylor by comic artist Frederick Noland. This was originally planned for 2023 but an autumn 2026 publication date was announced at the 2025 Comic Con in San Diego, where the cover was revealed.

== Marriage and family ==
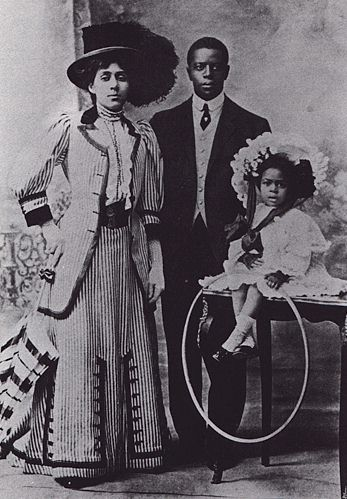
Taylor with his wife, Daisy, and daughter, Sydney, c. 1906–1907

Taylor's wife, Daisy Victoria Morris, was born on January 28, 1876, in Hudson, New York. Taylor married Morris in Ansonia, Connecticut, on March 21, 1902. Taylor met her around 1900 when she was living in Worcester, with her aunt and uncle.

While in Australia in 1904, Taylor and his wife had their only child, a daughter that they named Rita Sydney in honor of Sydney, where she was born on May 11. When Taylor, his wife, and daughter were not traveling, they lived in a large home on Hobson Avenue in Worcester that Taylor had purchased in 1900.

After his retirement from racing in 1910 and the failure of subsequent business ventures in the 1920s, Taylor and his wife became estranged. In 1930 she left him and moved to New York City. Around the same time Taylor left Worcester and moved to Chicago; he never saw his wife or daughter again.

Taylor's daughter Sydney, who graduated from the Sargent School of Culture in Boston in 1925 and the University of Chicago in 1936, taught physical education at West Virginia State University. She died in 2005 at age 101; her survivors include a son, Dallas C. Brown Jr., and his five children. In 1984, Taylor's daughter Sydney donated an extensive scrapbook collection on her father to the University of Pittsburgh Archives. The original scrapbooks were donated to the Indiana State Museum and Historic Sites in 1988.

== World records ==
List of world records set by Major Taylor
Date	Distance	Pacing/start	Time	Location	Refs
September 2, 1896	1/5 mile (0.32 km)	Unpaced, flying start	0:23 3/5	Capital City Track, Indianapolis	
August 27, 1898	1 mile (1.6 km)	Paced, standing start	1:43 2/5	Manhattan Beach, New York City	
August 27, 1898	1 mile (1.6 km)	Paced, standing start	1:41 2/5	Manhattan Beach, New York City	
September 5, 1898	1/2 mile (0.80 km)	Single-paced competition	0:58 4/5	Hampden Park, Springfield, MA	
November 4, 1898	1 kilometer (0.62 mi)	Paced	0:57 3/5	Woodside Park, Philadelphia	
November 5, 1898	1/4 mile (0.40 km)	Paced	0:22 2/5	Woodside Park, Philadelphia	
November 5, 1898	2 miles (3.2 km)	Paced	3:13 3/5	Woodside Park, Philadelphia	
November 12, 1898	1 mile (1.6 km)	Paced	1:32	Woodside Park, Philadelphia	
November 12, 1898	1/2 mile (0.80 km)	Paced	0:45 4/5	Woodside Park, Philadelphia	
November 12, 1898	1/2 mile (0.80 km)	Paced	0:45 3/5	Woodside Park, Philadelphia	
November 14, 1898	1/3 mile (0.54 km)	Paced	0:29 4/5	Woodside Park, Philadelphia	
November 15, 1898	1/2 mile (0.80 km)	Paced	0:45 2/5	Woodside Park, Philadelphia	
November 15, 1898	1 mile (1.6 km)	Paced	1:32	Woodside Park, Philadelphia	
November 15, 1898	1/4 mile (0.40 km)	Paced	0:22 1/5	Woodside Park, Philadelphia	
November 15, 1898	1/3 mile (0.54 km)	Paced	0:29 3/5	Woodside Park, Philadelphia	
November 15, 1898	1/2 mile (0.80 km)	Paced	0:45 2/5	Woodside Park, Philadelphia	
November 15, 1898	3/4 mile (1.2 km)	Paced	1:08 3/5	Woodside Park, Philadelphia	
November 15, 1898	1 mile (1.6 km)	Paced	1:32	Woodside Park, Philadelphia	
November 16, 1898	1/4 mile (0.40 km)	Paced	0:22 1/5	Woodside Park, Philadelphia	
November 16, 1898	1/3 mile (0.54 km)	Paced	0:29 3/5	Woodside Park, Philadelphia	
November 16, 1898	1/2 mile (0.80 km)	Paced	0:45 2/5	Woodside Park, Philadelphia	
November 16, 1898	2/3 mile (1.1 km)	Paced	1:00 4/5	Woodside Park, Philadelphia	
November 16, 1898	1 mile (1.6 km)	Paced	1:31 4/5	Woodside Park, Philadelphia	
November 16, 1898	1/2 mile (0.80 km)	Paced	0:45 1/5	Woodside Park, Philadelphia	
November 16, 1898	3/4 mile (1.2 km)	Paced	1:08 2/5	Woodside Park, Philadelphia	
August 3, 1899	1 mile (1.6 km)	Motor-paced	1:22 2/5	Garfield Park, Chicago	
November 9, 1899	1/4 mile (0.40 km)	Motor-paced	0:20	Garfield Park, Chicago	
November 10, 1899	1/2 mile (0.80 km)	Motor-paced	0:41	Garfield Park, Chicago	
November 15, 1899	1 mile (1.6 km)	Motor-paced	1:19	Garfield Park, Chicago	
December 14, 1900	1/4 mile (0.40 km)	Unpaced	0:25 4/5	Madison Square Garden, New York City	
August 1908	1/2 mile (0.80 km)	Standing start	0:42 1/5	Vélodrome Buffalo, Paris	
August 1908	1/4 mile (0.40 km)	Standing start	0:25 2/5	Vélodrome Buffalo, Paris	
August 26, 1908	1 mile (1.6 km)	Motor-paced	1:33 2/5	Vélodrome Buffalo, Paris	

== See also ==
- List of African-American firsts
- List of African-American sports firsts
- List of cyclists
- List of former students of the Conservatoire de Paris
- List of Indiana state historical markers in Marion County
- List of people from Indianapolis
- List of people from Worcester, Massachusetts
- Thomas Gascoyne (Note: Thomas Gascoyne was a dual world-recordholder from England who defeated Taylor twice in one day at Boston on July 20, 1901.)
- Major Taylor Trail

== Bibliography ==
- Balf, Todd (2008). Major: A Black Athlete, a White Era, and the Fight to Be the World's Fastest Human Being. New York City: Three Rivers Press. ISBN 978-0-307-23658-6.
- Brill, Marlene T. (2008). Marshall "Major" Taylor: World Champion Bicyclist, 1899–1901. Minneapolis, Minnesota: Twenty-First Century Books. ISBN 978-0-8225-6610-6.
- Campbell, Ballard C. (2008). Disasters, Accidents, and Crises in American History: A Reference Guide to the Nation's Most Catastrophic Events. New York City: Infobase Publishing. ISBN 978-1-4381-3012-5.
- Dalloni, Michel (2013). Le Vélo. 100 Questions sur (in French). Brussels: La Boétie. ISBN 978-2-368-65006-6.
- Della Valle, Paul (2009). Massachusetts Troublemakers: Rebels, Reformers, and Radicals from the Bay State. Lanham, Maryland: Rowman & Littlefield. ISBN 978-0-7627-5795-4.
- Gant, Jesse J.; Hoffman, Nicholas J. (Autumn 2013). "Wheel Fever". Wisconsin Magazine of History. Madison, Wisconsin: Wisconsin Historical Society.
- Gray, Ralph D. (2003). IUPUI—the Making of an Urban University. Bloomington, Indiana: Indiana University Press. ISBN 978-0-253-34242-3.
- Kerber, Conrad; Kerber, Terry (2014). Major Taylor: The Inspiring Story of a Black Cyclist and the Men Who Helped Him Achieve Worldwide Fame. New York City: Skyhorse Publishing. ISBN 978-1-62873-661-8.
- Kranish, Michael (2019). The World's Fastest Man: The Extraordinary Life of Cyclist Major Taylor, America's First Black Sports Hero. New York City: Simon & Schuster. ISBN 978-1-5011-9261-6.
- Novich, Max M. (1964). Abbotempo. United Kingdom: Abbott Universal.
- Ritchie, Andrew (1988). Major Taylor: The Extraordinary Career of a Champion Bicycle Racer. Mill Valley, California: Bicycle Books. ISBN 978-0-8018-5303-6.
- Taylor, Marshall (1928). The Fastest Bicycle Rider in the World: The Story of a Colored Boy's Indomitable Courage and Success Against Great Odds: An Autobiography. Worcester, Massachusetts: Wormley Publishing Company. OCLC 1989465. (reprinted Ayer, 2004: ISBN 9780836989106)
