= Major Taylor Velodrome =

Outdoor velodrome in Indianapolis, Indiana, US

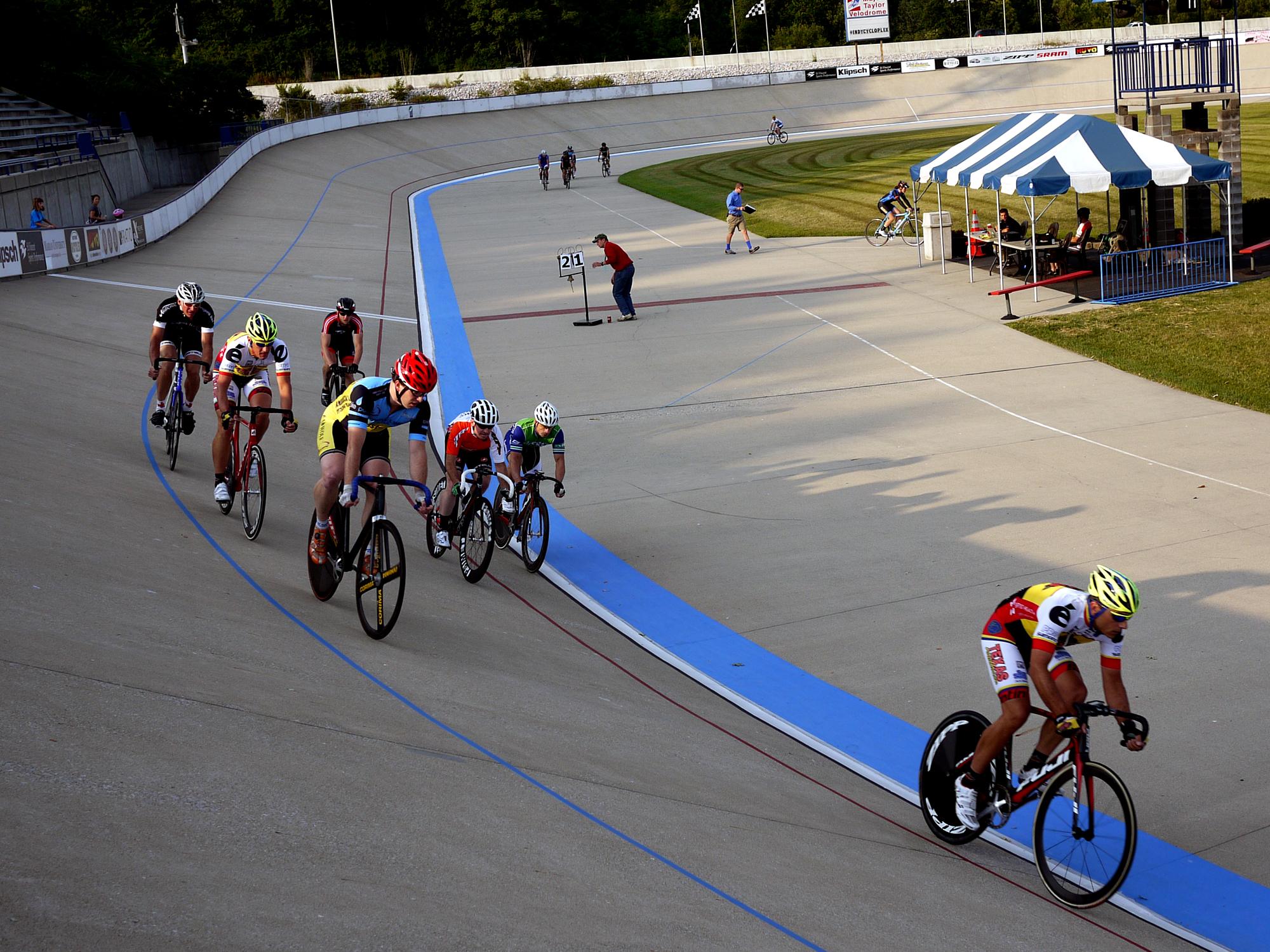
- Racing at Major Taylor Velodrome in 2014
- Interactive map of Major Taylor Velodrome
- Location: Indianapolis, Indiana, U.S.
- Coordinates: 39°49′17.2″N 86°11′57.7″W
- Owner: City of Indianapolis
- Operator: Marian University
- Surface: Concrete
- Field size: 333.34 m (364.55 yd) track

Construction
- Opened: July 15, 1982; 44 years ago
- Cost: US$2.5 million
- Architect: Howard Needles Tammen and Bergendoff
- General contractors: Tousley-Bixler Construction Company, Inc.

Website
- indycycloplex.com/track

The Major Taylor Velodrome is an outdoor, concrete velodrome in Indianapolis, Indiana, U.S., named for 1899 cycling world champion Major Taylor. The 333.34 m (364.55 yd) track with 28 degree banked turns and 9 degree straights. The Velodrome is located immediately north of the Marian University campus and is the home track of the 41-time USA Cycling National Champion Marian University Cycling Team.

The velodrome was opened in July 1982 for the U.S. Olympic Festival. It was built at a cost of $2.5 million. It was a facility required to host that year's National Sports Festival, with money coming from a partnership between the Indianapolis Parks and Recreation Department and the Lilly Endowment. It was the first building built with public money in Indianapolis to be named after an African American. The proposal to name the facility for Taylor came initially from Tom Healy, a writer for the Indianapolis News, who contacted Taylor's daughter, Sydney Taylor Brown. The two advocated among the city's business community and Mayor William H. Hudnut.

It has played host to many national and international competitions, including cycling events of the 1987 Pan American Games; USA Cycling's Collegiate Track National Championships in 2003, 2010, 2011, 2014, and 2017; and USA Cycling's Masters Track National Championships in 2005, 2013, and 2016. In May 2011, Marian University took over operations of the velodrome property, known as the Indy Cycloplex, which includes a BMX track, mountain bike trails, cyclocross course, and public green space. In the years following the shift in operation, the facility has focused on promoting youth health and fitness as well as the continuous development of the sport of competitive cycling. Weekly and daily programming takes place on the Velodrome from April through September, including a Thursday night race series, the Major Taylor Racing League.

== See also ==
- List of cycling tracks and velodromes
- List of attractions and events in Indianapolis
- Sports in Indianapolis
