= Nat Butler =

American cyclist

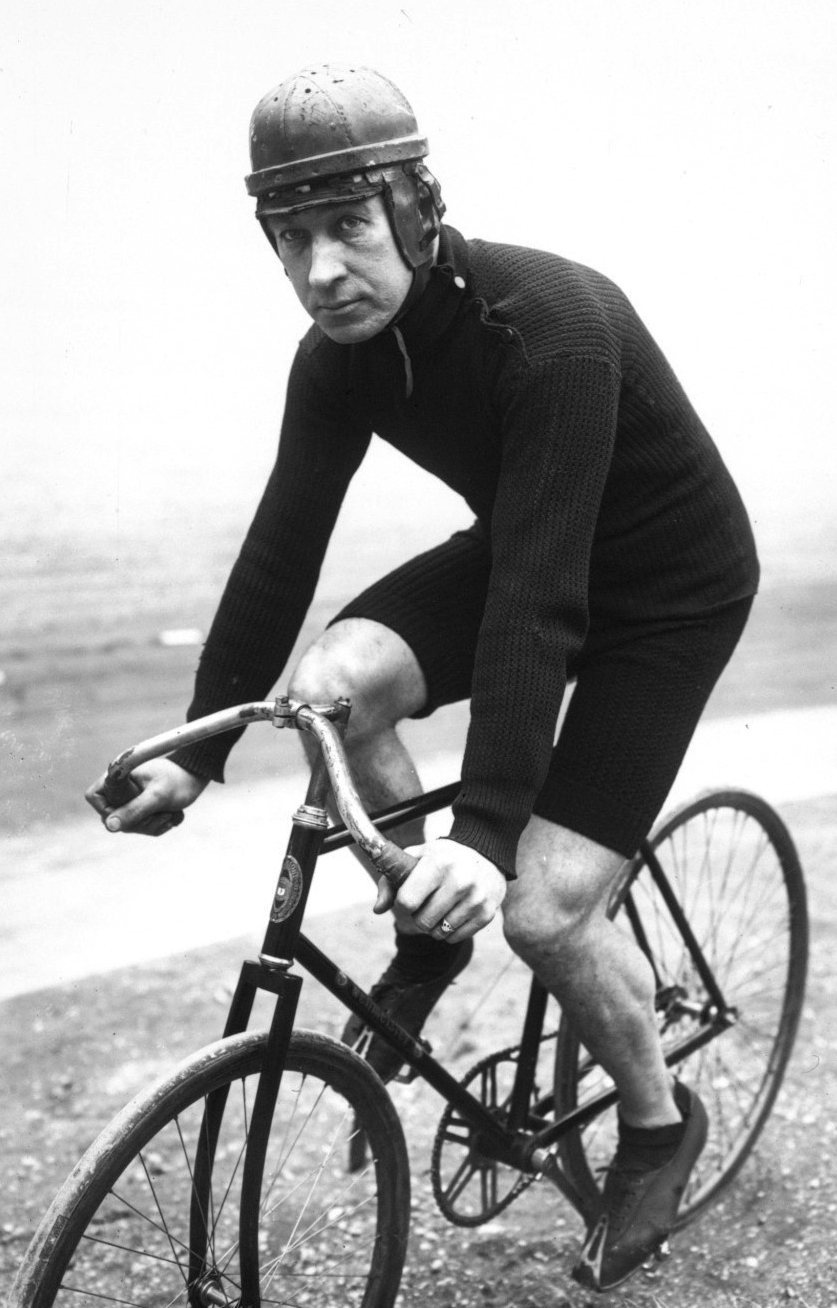
- Nat Butler in 1910

Personal information
- Born: January 6, 1870 Halifax, Nova Scotia, Canada
- Died: May 24, 1943 (aged 73) Revere, Massachusetts, United States

Sport
- Sport: Cycling
Medal record
Representing the United States
World Championships
Bronze medal – third place	1909 Copenhagen	Motor-paced, professionals

Nathaniel Butler (January 6, 1870 – May 24, 1943) was an American pioneer professional cyclist. On track he won a bronze medal in the motor-paced racing at the 1909 World Championships. On the road he won the Luiscott Race in 1893 and finished second in the New York six-day race in 1903. His brothers Tom and Frank were also competitive cyclists.

Butler was born in Halifax, Nova Scotia, in a family of a craftsman and grew up in Cambridge, Massachusetts. He won his first race, the Luiscott Race, in 1893 and received as prize two diamonds and a horse with carriage. He then turned professional, and competed in motor-paced racing at the 1899 World Championships, together with brother Tom. Tom finished second and Nat placed fourth.

Butler finished second in the New York six-day race in 1903, and from 1905 on competed in Europe. During his first year in Europe he participated in the famous Bol d'Or on Paris' Buffalo track, where he finished third. He retired around 1910 and in 1913 took over the velodrome "Revere Cycletrack" near his hometown of Cambridge. In later years, he became an established landscape painter.
