= 1899 ICA Track Cycling World Championships =

Cycling competition

- Venue: Montreal, Quebec, Canada
- Date: 9–11 August 1899
- Velodrome: Vélodrome de Queen's Park
- Events: 4

The 1899 ICA Track Cycling World Championships were the World Championship for track cycling. They took place in Montreal, Quebec, Canada from 9 to 11 August 1899. Four events for men were contested, two for professionals and two for amateurs.

== Medal summary ==
Event	Gold	Silver	Bronze
Men's Professional Events
Men's sprint	Major Taylor; United States	Tom Butler; United States	Gaston Courbe d'Outrelon; France
Men's motor-paced	Harry Gibson; Canada	Hugh Mclean; United States	Ken Boake; United States
Men's Amateur Events
Men's sprint	Thomas Summersgill; Great Britain	E. Peebody; United States	J. Caldow; Canada
Men's motor-paced	John Nelson; United States	Robert Goodson; United States	William Riddle; Canada

== Medal table ==
Rank	Nation	Gold	Silver	Bronze	Total
1	United States (USA)	2	4	1	7
2	Canada (CAN)	1	0	2	3
3	Great Britain (GBR)	1	0	0	1
4	France (FRA)	0	0	1	1
Totals (4 entries)		4	4	4	12
