= Tom Butler (cyclist) =

American cyclist

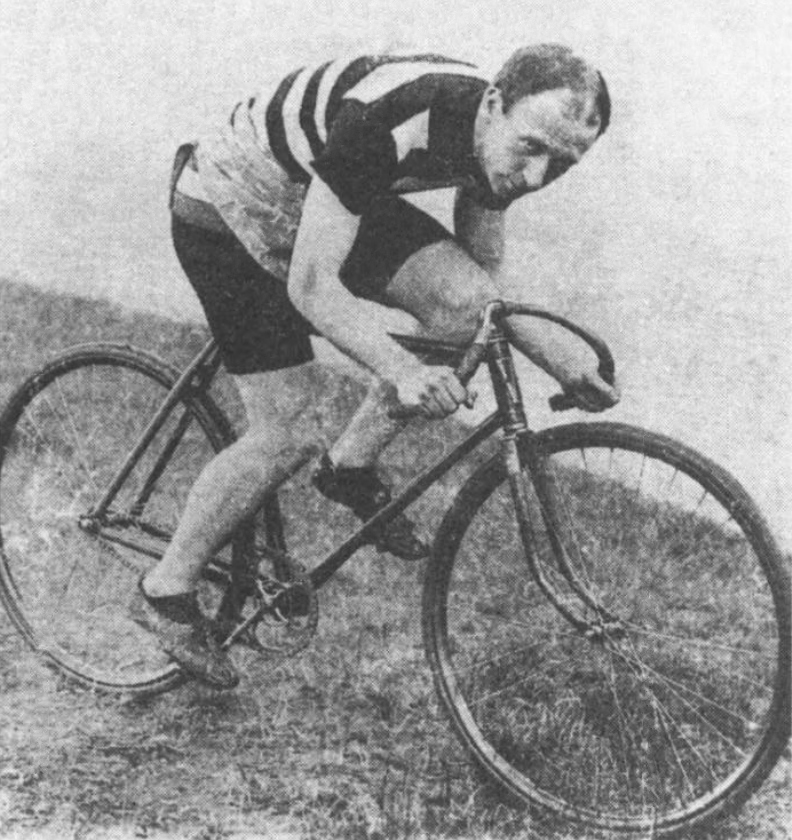

Personal information
- Born: 20 December 1877 Halifax, Nova Scotia, Canada
- Died: 18 August 1942 (aged 64) Boston, Massachusetts

Sport
- Sport: Cycling
Medal record
Representing the United States
World Championships
Silver medal – second place	1899 Montreal	Sprint

Thomas Stanley Butler (December 20, 1877 – August 18, 1942) was a Canadian-American professional track cyclist. Though he was not yet a U.S. citizen, he won the U.S. national sprint title in 1898 and finished second at the 1899 UCI Track Cycling World Championships while representing the United States. His elder brothers Nat and Frank were also professional cyclists; the brothers often competed together, working as a team against other riders. This was also the case at the 1899 World Championships, where Nat finished fourth.

Butler was born in Halifax, Nova Scotia, the fourth son of Irish parents William and Sarah Butler. The family immigrated to Massachusetts in 1888. He married Evelyn Heselton Trenholm in 1915; they divorced in 1941. He became a U.S. citizen in the 1920s.
