= Major Taylor Trail =

Shared-use path in Chicago, Illinois, US

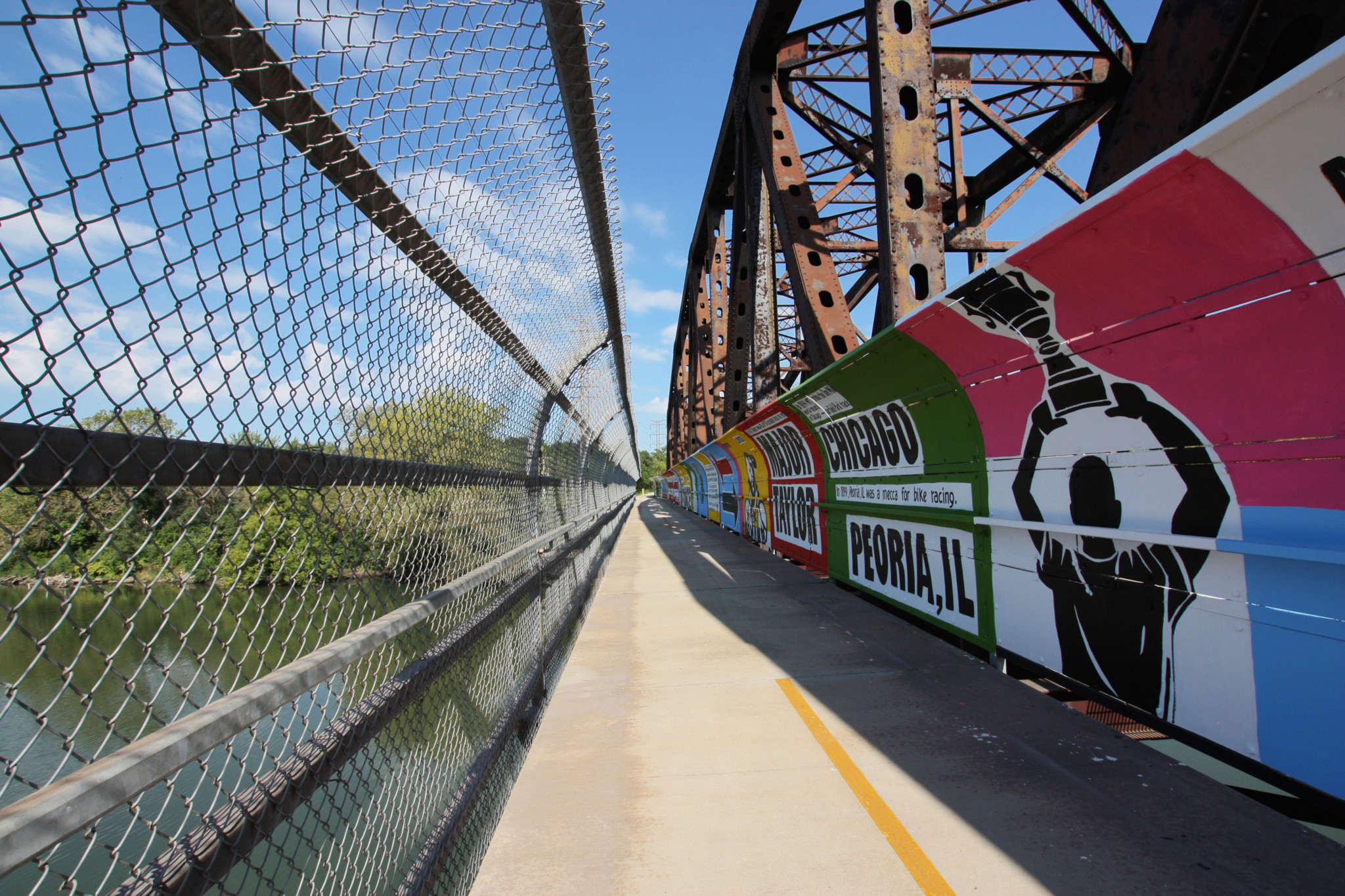
- Major Taylor Trail crossing the Little Calumet River
- Length: 8.1 miles (13.0 km)
- Location: Chicago, Illinois, US
- Trailheads: Dan Ryan Woods north of W. 83rd St. at S. Western Ave. (Chicago); Whistler Woods north of W. 134th St. at S. Halsted St./SR 1 (Riverdale)
- Use: Cycling, skateboarding, scootering, personal transporter, and pedestrians
- Difficulty: Easy
- Season: Limited access during winter

The Major Taylor Trail is a 8.1-mile-long (13.0 km) partial shared-use path for walking, jogging, skateboarding, and cycling, located in the southside of Chicago, Illinois.

== See also ==
- Cycling in Chicago
