= Vélodrome de Queen's Park =

Velodrome in Verdun, Montreal, Canada

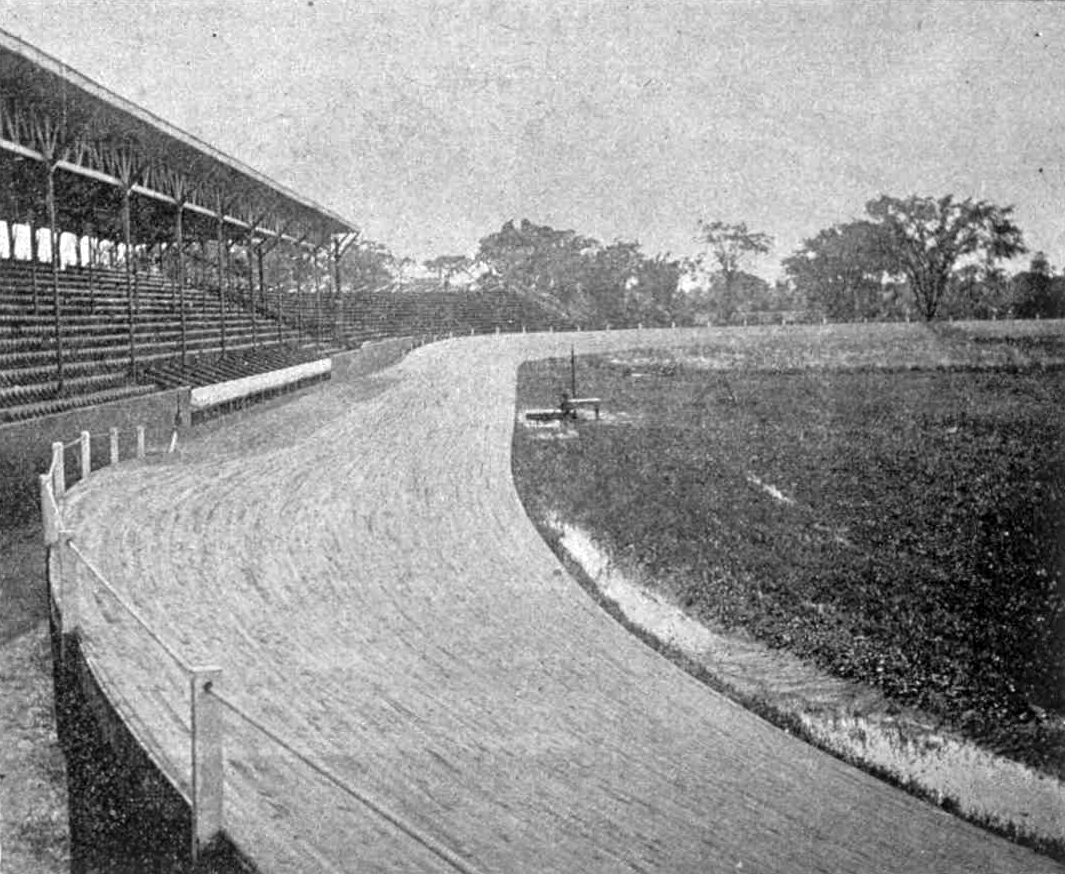
- Vélodrome de Queen's Park in 1899
- Interactive map of Vélodrome de Queen's Park
- Location: Verdun, Montreal, Canada
- Coordinates: 45.45°N 73.566667°W
- Capacity: 8,000–12,000
- Surface: Wood

Construction
- Groundbreaking: 25 April 1898
- Opened: 24 May 1898

The Vélodrome de Queen's Park was a velodrome in Verdun, Montreal, Canada. It hosted the 1899 ICA Track Cycling World Championships between 9 and 11 August.

== See also ==
- List of cycling tracks and velodromes
