= Cycling at the 1912 Summer Olympics =

Cycling at the Games of the V Olympiad
- Venues: Road race around Lake Mälaren
- Date: 7 July 1912
- Competitors: 123 from 16 nations

At the 1912 Summer Olympics in Stockholm, one cycling event was contested on Sunday, 7 July. This event was a time trial which also counted as an individual race. For the only time in Olympic history, no track cycling events were held.

== Amateur definitions ==
In cycling, where, according to the agreement made by the national associations affiliated to the Union Cycliste Internationale, every amateur was to be provided with a certificate issued by the Union or by one of the said associations.

The amateur regulation was as follows:

The competition is only open to amateurs with a license from the Union Cycliste Internationale or any affiliated to the above-mentioned Union. A certified copy of such license shall accompany each entry.

== Medal summary ==
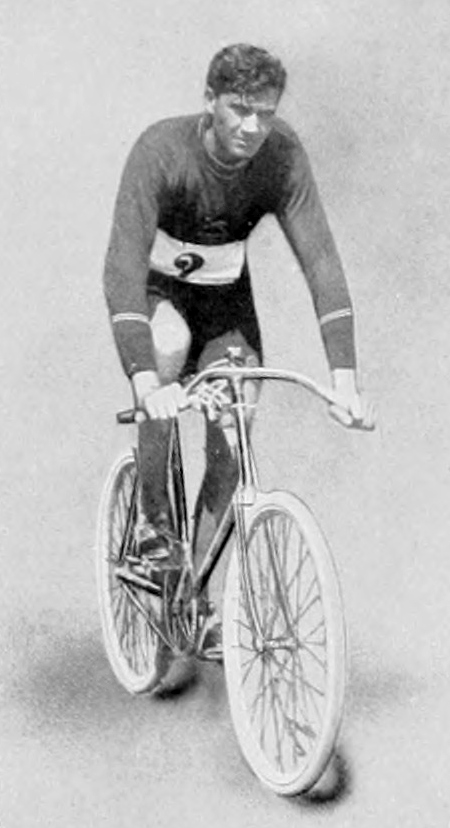
Rudolph Lewis

Games	Gold	Silver	Bronze
Individual time trial	Rudolph Lewis; South Africa	Frederick Grubb; Great Britain	Carl Schutte; United States
Team time trial	Sweden; Erik Friborg; Ragnar Malm; Axel Persson; Algot Lönn	Great Britain; Frederick Grubb; Leonard Meredith; Charles Moss; William Hammond	United States; Carl Schutte; Alvin Loftes; Albert Krushel; Walter Martin

== Participating nations ==
A total of 123 cyclists from sixteen nations competed at the Stockholm Games:

- Austria (6)
- Belgium (1)
- Bohemia (5)
- Canada (2)
- Chile (4)
- Denmark (8)
- Finland (5)
- France (12)

- Germany (11)
- Great Britain (26)
- Hungary (5)
- Norway (6)
- Russia (10)
- South Africa (1)
- Sweden (12)
- United States (9)

== Medal table ==
Rank	Nation	Gold	Silver	Bronze	Total
1	South Africa	1	0	0	1
1	Sweden	1	0	0	1
3	Great Britain	0	2	0	2
4	United States	0	0	2	2
Totals (4 entries)		2	2	2	6
