= Cycling at the 1912 Summer Olympics – Men's team time trial =

Cycling at the Olympics

Men's team time trial at the Games of the V Olympiad
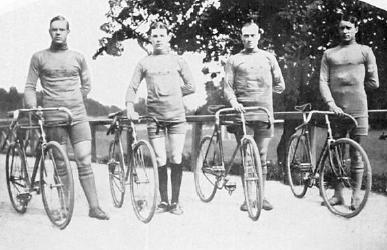
- The winning team of Sweden.
- Venue: Roads near Mälaren
- Date: July 7, 1912
- Competitors: 119 from 13 nations

Medalists
| 1st place, gold medalist(s) | | Sweden |
| 2nd place, silver medalist(s) | | Great Britain (England) |
| 3rd place, bronze medalist(s) | | United States |

The men's team time trial was a road bicycle racing event held as part of the cycling at the 1912 Summer Olympics programme. It was the first appearance of the event. The competition was held on Sunday July 7, 1912.

Each nation that sent at least four cyclists to the individual time trial was also considered to have competed as a team. The times of the top four cyclists for each nation were summed to give a total team time, with the best total times winning. Great Britain had three teams, as the English, Irish, and Scottish cyclists were considered separate.

Belgium, Canada, and South Africa did not send enough cyclists to make a team.

Three teams did not have enough cyclists finish to earn a valid team score. Only three of Bohemia's five cyclists finished, as did three of Norway's six. Only one of Russia's ten cyclists finished.

== Medalists ==
| Gold | Silver | Bronze |
|---|---|---|
| Sweden; Erik Friborg; Algot Lönn; Ragnar Malm; Axel Persson | Great Britain; Frederick Grubb; William Hammond; Leon Meredith; Charles Moss | United States; Albert Krushel; Alvin Loftes; Walden Martin; Carl Schutte |

== Results ==
| Place | Team | Ind. place | Ind. time | Total time |
Final
| Gold | Sweden | | | 44:35:33.6 |
| Gold | Erik Friborg | 7 | 11:04:17.0 | 44:35:33.6 |
| Gold | Ragnar Malm | 8 | 11:08:14.5 | 44:35:33.6 |
| Gold | Axel Persson | 9 | 11:10:59.6 | 44:35:33.6 |
| Gold | Algot Lönn | 10 | 11:12:02.5 | 44:35:33.6 |
| Silver | Great Britain — England | | | 44:44:39.4 |
| Silver | Frederick Grubb | 2 | 10:51:24.2 | 44:44:39.4 |
| Silver | Leon Meredith | 4 | 11:00:02.6 | 44:44:39.4 |
| Silver | Charles Moss | 18 | 11:23:55.8 | 44:44:39.4 |
| Silver | William Hammond | 22 | 11:29:16.8 | 44:44:39.4 |
| Bronze | United States | | | 44:47:55.5 |
| Bronze | Carl Schutte | 3 | 10:52:38.8 | 44:47:55.5 |
| Bronze | Alvin Loftes | 11 | 11:13:51.3 | 44:47:55.5 |
| Bronze | Albert Krushel | 13 | 11:17:30.2 | 44:47:55.5 |
| Bronze | Walden Martin | 17 | 11:23:55.2 | 44:47:55.5 |
| 4 | Great Britain — Scotland | | | 46:29:55.6 |
| 4 | John Wilson | 16 | 11:21:43.0 | 46:29:55.6 |
| 4 | Robert Thompson | 24 | 11:31:16.0 | 46:29:55.6 |
| 4 | John Miller | 35 | 11:44:01.6 | 46:29:55.6 |
| 4 | David Stevenson | 41 | 11:52:55.0 | 46:29:55.6 |
| 5 | Finland | | | 46:34:03.5 |
| 5 | Antti Raita | 6 | 11:02:20.3 | 46:34:03.5 |
| 5 | Vilho Tilkanen | 21 | 11:28:38.5 | 46:34:03.5 |
| 5 | Johan Kankkonen | 34 | 11:41:35.5 | 46:34:03.5 |
| 5 | Hjalmar Väre | 66 | 12:21:29.2 | 46:34:03.5 |
| 6 | Germany | | | 46:35:16.1 |
| 6 | Franz Lemnitz | 26 | 11:34:32.2 | 46:35:16.1 |
| 6 | Rudolf Baier | 27 | 11:35:01.5 | 46:35:16.1 |
| 6 | Oswald Rathmann | 33 | 11:40:18.4 | 46:35:16.1 |
| 6 | Georg Warsow | 36 | 11:45:24.0 | 46:35:16.1 |
| 7 | Austria | | | 46:57:26.4 |
| 7 | Robert Rammer | 23 | 11:30:40.8 | 46:57:26.4 |
| 7 | Adolf Kofler | 31 | 11:39:32.6 | 46:57:26.4 |
| 7 | Rudolf Kramer | 43 | 11:53:12.8 | 46:57:26.4 |
| 7 | Josef Hellensteiner | 45 | 11:54:00.2 | 46:57:26.4 |
| 8 | Denmark | | | 47:16:07.0 |
| 8 | Olaf Meyland-Smith | 25 | 11:32:24.2 | 47:16:07.0 |
| 8 | Charles Hansen (cyclist) | 32 | 11:40:04.0 | 47:16:07.0 |
| 8 | Johannes Reinwaldt | 48 | 11:57:20.0 | 47:16:07.0 |
| 8 | Godtfred Olsen | 53 | 12:06:18.8 | 47:16:07.0 |
| 9 | Chile | | | 49:14:52.0 |
| 9 | Alberto Downey | 42 | 11:53:02.5 | 49:14:52.0 |
| 9 | Cárlos Koller | 58 | 12:13:49.2 | 49:14:52.0 |
| 9 | Arturo Friedemann | 69 | 12:28:20.8 | 49:14:52.0 |
| 9 | José Torres | 74 | 12:39:39.5 | 49:14:52.0 |
| 10 | France | | | 49:44:35.2 |
| 10 | Joseph Racine | 40 | 11:50:32.7 | 49:44:35.2 |
| 10 | André Capelle | 50 | 11:59:48.4 | 49:44:35.2 |
| 10 | René Gagnet | 64 | 12:20:32.6 | 49:44:35.2 |
| 10 | Georges Valentin | 83 | 13:33:59.5 | 49:44:35.2 |
| 11 | Great Britain — Ireland | | | 51:19:38.5 |
| 11 | Michael Walker | 67 | 12:27:49.9 | 51:19:38.5 |
| 11 | Francis Guy | 71 | 12:32:19.4 | 51:19:38.5 |
| 11 | Ralph Mecredy | 80 | 13:03:39.0 | 51:19:38.5 |
| 11 | John Walker | 81 | 13:15:50.2 | 51:19:38.5 |
| 12 | Hungary | | | 51:51:15.9 |
| 12 | István Müller | 73 | 12:39:28.0 | 51:51:15.9 |
| 12 | János Henzsel | 75 | 12:42:16.3 | 51:51:15.9 |
| 12 | Gyula Mazur | 77 | 12:50:55.8 | 51:51:15.9 |
| 12 | Ignác Teiszenberger | 84 | 13:38:35.8 | 51:51:15.9 |
| — | Bohemia | | | — |
| — | Bohumil Rameš | 63 | 12:20:12.2 | — |
| — | Václav Tintěra | 87 | 14:10:34.6 | — |
| — | Bohumil Kubrycht | 88 | 14:11:21.0 | — |
| — | 2 others did not finish | — | — | — |
| — | Norway | | | — |
| — | Birgir Andreassen | 14 | 11:20:14.6 | — |
| — | Paul Henrichsen | 47 | 11:55:23.2 | — |
| — | Anton Hansen | 65 | 12:21:23.7 | — |
| — | 3 others did not finish | — | — | — |
| — | Russian Empire | | | — |
| — | Andrejs Apsītis | 60 | 12:18:20.6 | — |
| — | 9 others did not finish | — | — | — |
