= Rathmann =

Rathmann is a surname. Notable people with the surname include:

- Dick Rathmann (1924–2000), American racecar driver
- George Rathmann (1927–2012), American chemist, biologist, pioneer in biotechnology and corporate executive
- Jim Rathmann (1928–2011), born Royal Richard Rathmann, American racecar driver who won the Indianapolis 500 in 1960
- Oswald Rathmann (born 1891), German road racing cyclist who competed in the 1912 Summer Olympics
- Peggy Rathmann (born 1953), American illustrator and writer of children's picture books

== See also ==
- Rahman (disambiguation)
- Rathausmann
- Ratman
