= Václav Tintěra =

Czech cyclist

Personal information
- Born: 20 March 1893 Prague, Czechoslovakia

Cycling career
- Sport: Cycling

Václav Tintěra (born 20 March 1893, date of death unknown) was a Czech cyclist. He competed for Bohemia at the 1912 Summer Olympics.

In the men's individual time trial, he finished in 87th place. The Bohemian team—consisting of Bohumil Rameš, Tintěra, Bohumil Kubrycht, František Kundert, and Jan Vokoun—did not place in the men's team time trial. He competed for the club AC Sparta Prague.
