= Alberto Downey =

Chilean cyclist

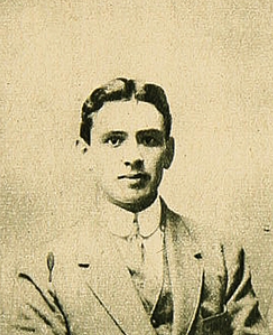
- Downey in 1927

Personal information
- Full name: Alberto V. Downey
- Born: 2 October 1890 Linares, Chile
- Died: 2 March 1951 (aged 60) Santiago, Chile

Cycling career
- Sport: Cycling

Alberto V. Downey (2 October 1890 - 2 March 1951) was a Chilean cyclist and boxer. Initially competing as a cyclist in 1912, he won two editions of the Chilean cycling championship and set a national record. He was selected to be part of the Chilean team at the 1912 Summer Olympics for their debut appearance. There, he placed 42nd individually and ninth as part of a team. After his cycling career, he found moderate success in boxing, winning eight of his thirteen recorded fights.

== Biography ==
Alberto V. Downey was born on 2 October 1890 in Linares, Chile. He won a 160 kilometres (99 mi) race billed as the first edition of the national cycling championship held in April 1912 at Parque Cousiño. That same year, he set a national record and won the 50 kilometre (31 mi) national championship.

Downey was selected to be part of the Chilean team at the 1912 Summer Olympics held in Stockholm as one of the first Chilean representatives at the Olympic Games. In the men's individual time trial held on 7 July, he was the highest ranked Chilean cyclist with a placement of 42nd out of the 94 cyclists that finished the race and a time of 11:53:02.5. The combined times of the first four athletes from each nation were used for the men's team trial. Together with his teammates Cárlos Koller, Arturo Friedemann, and José Torres, they placed ninth out of the twelve teams that completed the race.

Two years later after his cycling career, he took up boxing as his new sport. He followed the English style of boxing and was considered a scientific boxer, nicknamed the "Chilean Carpentier". In 1917, he won the vacant Chilean welterweight title. Two years later after the fight, he was in a bout for the Chilean middleweight title but lost. This would be his last documented fight. In his career, he won eight, lost three, and drew one of his thirteen fights, with one of his fights resulting in a no-decision. By 1922, he was preparing for a comeback.

Downey later died on 2 March 1951 in Santiago, Chile, at the age of 60.
