= Kankkunen =

Kankkunen is a Finnish surname. Notable people with the surname include:

- Juha Kankkunen (born 1959), Finnish rally driver
- Teemu Kankkunen (born 1980), Finnish footballer and coach

== See also ==
- Kankkonen
