= Vokoun =

Vokoun (feminine: Vokounová) is a surname of Czech origin. Notable people with the surname include:

- Jan Vokoun (1887–?), Czech cyclist
- Kamila Vokoun Hájková (born 1987), Czech ice dancer
- Pavel Vokoun (born 1970), Czech swimmer
- Tomáš Vokoun (born 1976), Czech ice hockey player
