= Chile at the 1912 Summer Olympics =

- IOC code: CHI
- NOC: Chilean Olympic Committee

in Stockholm
- Competitors: 14 in 4 sports
- Flag bearer: Leopoldo Palma
- Medals: Gold 0 Silver 0 Bronze 0 Total 0

Summer Olympics appearances (overview)
- 1896; 1900–1908; 1912; 1920; 1924; 1928; 1932; 1936; 1948; 1952; 1956; 1960; 1964; 1968; 1972; 1976; 1980; 1984; 1988; 1992; 1996; 2000; 2004; 2008; 2012; 2016; 2020; 2024

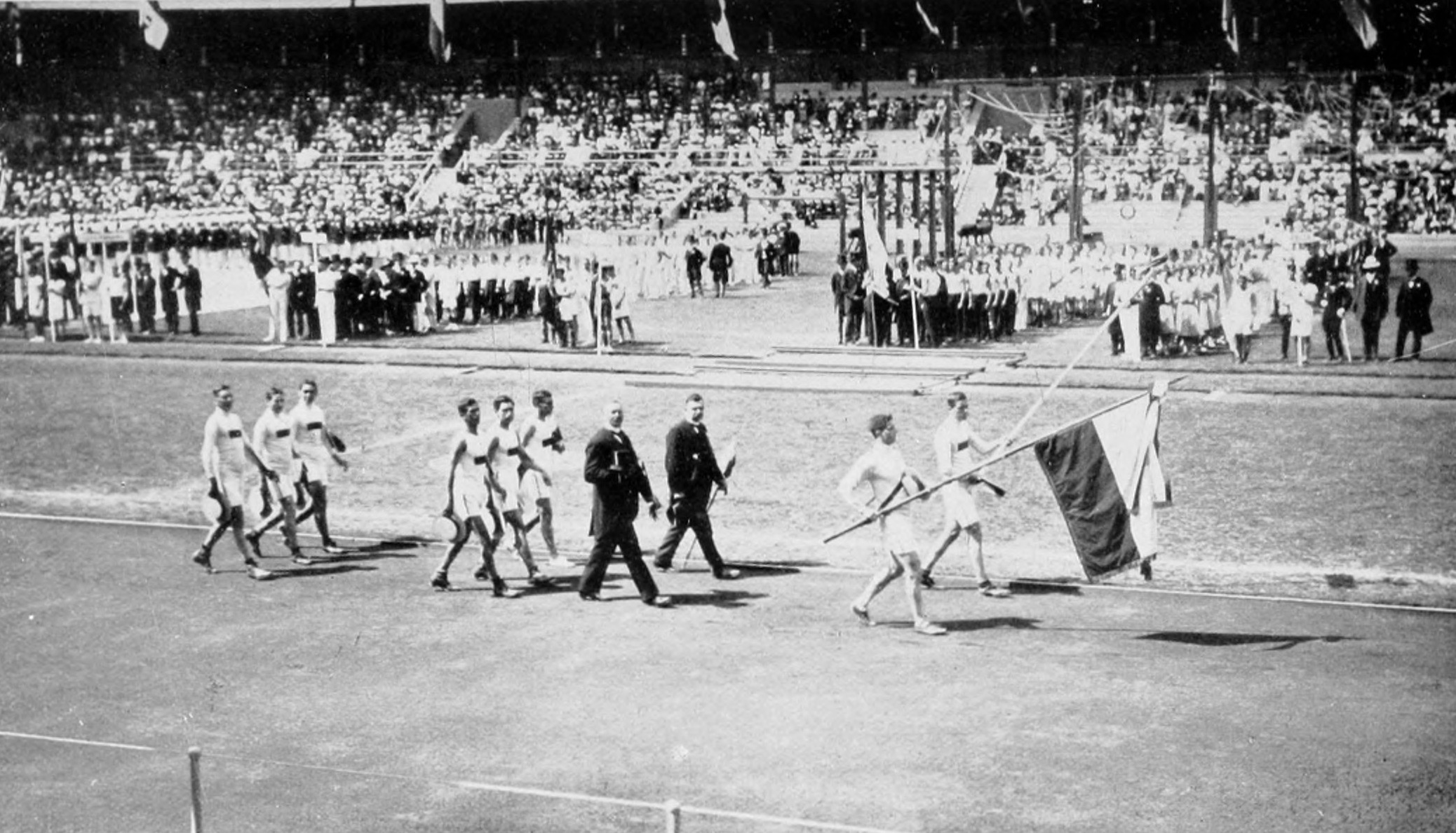
The team of Chile at the opening ceremony.

Chile at the 1912 Summer Olympics in Stockholm, Sweden was the nation's first official appearance out of four editions of the Summer Olympic Games. Some sources claim that Chile was represented by one athlete, Luis Subercaseaux, at the 1896 Summer Olympics. That cannot be substantiated because the Official Report typically includes only medal winners and Subercaseaux did not win any.

The all-male 1912 national team of fourteen athletes competed in sixteen events in four sports.

== Athletics ==
6 athletes represented Chile.

Ranks given are within that athlete's heat for running events.

Athlete	Events	Heat		Semifinal		Final	
Athlete	Events	Result	Rank	Result	Rank	Result	Rank
Pablo Eitel	100 m	?	6	did not advance			
Pablo Eitel	200 m	?	5	did not advance			
Pablo Eitel	110 m hurdles	17.2	1	?	4	did not advance	
Rodolfo Hammersley	High jump	N/A		1.60	28	did not advance	
Rodolfo Hammersley	Standing high jump	N/A		1.40	13	did not advance	
Federico Mueller	800 m	?	5–7	did not advance			
Leopoldo Palma	800 m	?	4	did not advance			
Rolando Salinas	10 km walk	55:02	7	did not advance			
Alfonso Sánchez	5000 m	N/A		did not finish		did not advance	
Alfonso Sánchez	10000 m	N/A		did not finish		did not advance	
Alfonso Sánchez	Marathon	N/A				did not start	

== Cycling ==
Four cyclists represented Chile. It was the first appearance of the nation in cycling. Alberto Downey had the best time in the time trial, the only race held, placing 42nd. The team of four had a combined time that placed them 9th of the 15 teams.

=== Road cycling ===
Cyclist	Events	Final	
Cyclist	Events	Result	Rank
Alberto Downey	Ind. time trial	11:53:02.5	42
Arturo Friedemann	Ind. time trial	12:28:20.8	67
Cárlos Koller	Ind. time trial	12:13:49.2	58
José Torres	Ind. time trial	12:39:39.5	74
Alberto Downey; Arturo Friedemann; Carlos Koller; José Torres	Team time trial	49:14:52.0	9

== Equestrian ==
Jumping

Rider	Horse	Event	Final	
Rider	Horse	Event	Penalties	Rank
Enrique Deichler	Chile	Individual	14	16
Elías Yáñez	Patria	Individual	24	25

== Shooting ==
Two shooters represented Chile. It was the nation's debut in shooting. Both men took part in the same four events, with Ekwall being the better of the pair in three of those events.

Rower	Event	Final	
Rower	Event	Result	Rank
Félix Alegría	600 m free rifle	61	72
Félix Alegría	300 m military rifle, 3 pos.	77	48
Félix Alegría	50 m pistol	406	38
Félix Alegría	30 m rapid fire pistol	259	25
Harald Ekwall	600 m free rifle	67	67
Harald Ekwall	300 m military rifle, 3 pos.	80	43
Harald Ekwall	50 m pistol	430	23
Harald Ekwall	30 m rapid fire pistol	217	38
