= Tilkanen =

Surname list

Tilkanen is a Finnish surname. Notable people with the surname include:

- Lauri Tilkanen (born 1987), Finnish actor
- Vilho Tilkanen (1885–1945), Finnish road racing cyclist
