= Vienna City Hall =

19th-century Neo-Gothic city hall in Vienna, Austria

- Wiener Rathaus
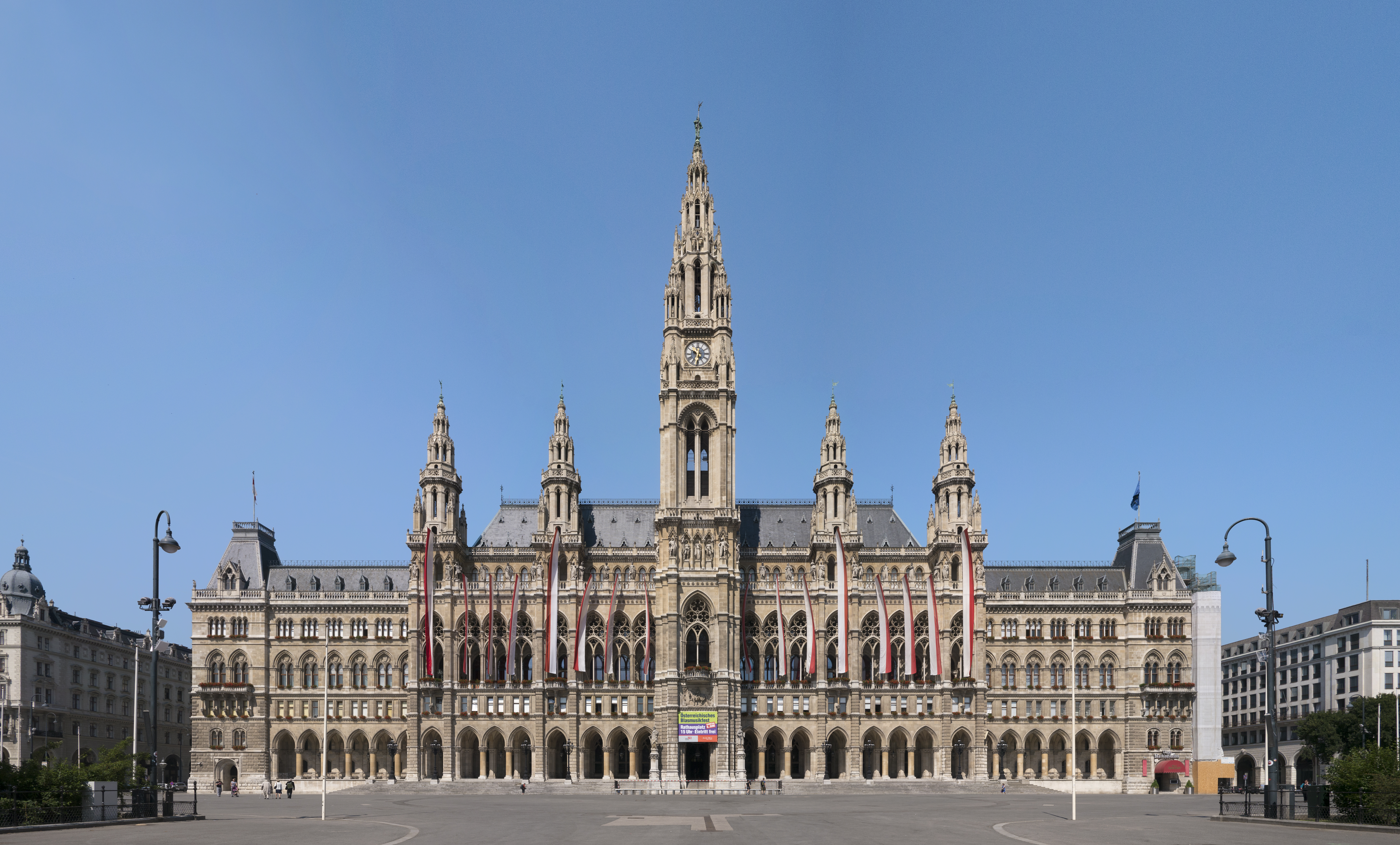
- Main facade of the Wiener Rathaus facing Rathausplatz

- Location within Vienna

General information
- Type: City hall
- Architectural style: Gothic Revival
- Location: Rathausplatz 1, 1010 Innere Stadt, Vienna, Austria
- Coordinates: 48°12′39″N 16°21′26″E
- Current tenants: Mayor of Vienna, Landtag of Vienna, Vienna City Library
- Construction started: 1872
- Completed: 1883
- Inaugurated: 12 September 1883
- Cost: 14 million Gulden
- Client: City Council of Vienna
- Owner: City of Vienna

Height
- Height: 98 m (322 ft) (103.3 m / 339 ft including Rathausmann)

Dimensions
- Other dimensions: Length: 152 m (499 ft); Width: 127 m (417 ft)

Technical details
- Structural system: Brick masonry with natural stone cladding
- Floor count: 6
- Floor area: 113,000 m^{2} (1,220,000 ft^{2})

Design and construction
- Architect: Friedrich von Schmidt
- Other designers: Alexander Nehr (sculptor of the Rathausmann)

The Vienna City Hall (German: Wiener Rathaus; [ʁaːtˌhaʊs]) is the town hall of Vienna, Austria, located in the Innere Stadt on the Rathausplatz, off the Ringstrasse. The Gothic Revival building was designed by Friedrich von Schmidt and constructed between 1872 and 1883. It houses the offices of the Mayor of Vienna, as well as the city and state government.

== History ==
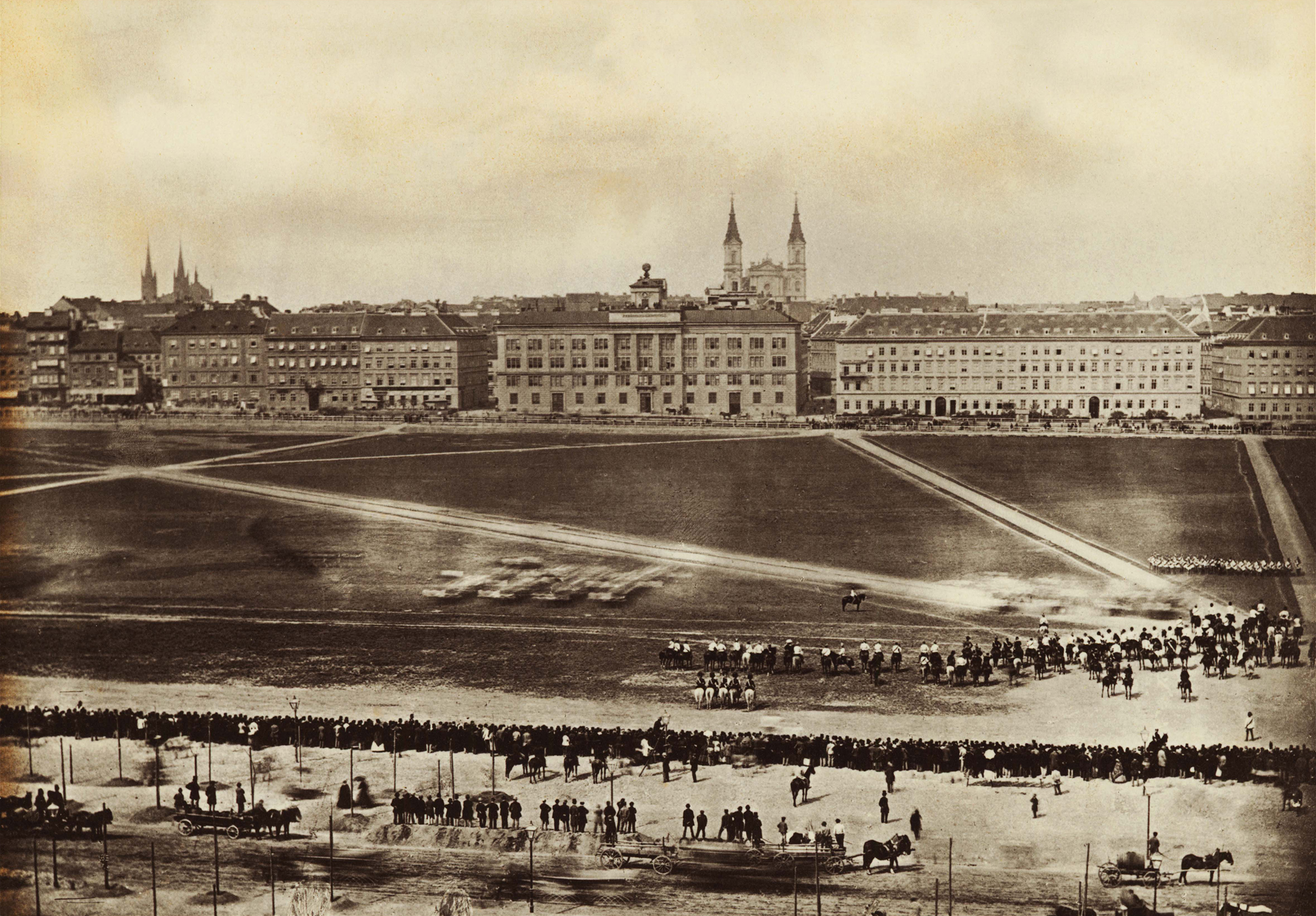
The parade ground on the Josefstädter Glacis in 1860, the future site of the Rathaus

=== Background ===
By 1850, Vienna's rapid expansion, driven by the integration of nearby suburbs, made the Altes Rathaus on Wipplingerstraße inadequate. With the demolition of city walls between 1858 and 1865 to build the Ringstraße, a competition for a new city hall was held in 1868. German architect Friedrich von Schmidt won the commission, and the new building was planned for the Ringstraße, alongside other major constructions like the Vienna State Opera (1869), the Parliament Building (1883), the University of Vienna's main building (1884), and the Burgtheater (1888).

Initially, a site across from Stadtpark, Vienna's first municipal park, was considered. However, the city ultimately chose a location on the Josefstädter Glacis, a former restricted area in front of the demolished city walls, which had served as a parade ground. This site was secured in 1870 following interventions by Mayor Cajetan Felder. Debates between the city administration and imperial government over financial contributions to the Ringstraße project made the location of the new city hall a significant issue, symbolizing the rising confidence of the bourgeoisie in relation to the Emperor.

=== Construction ===
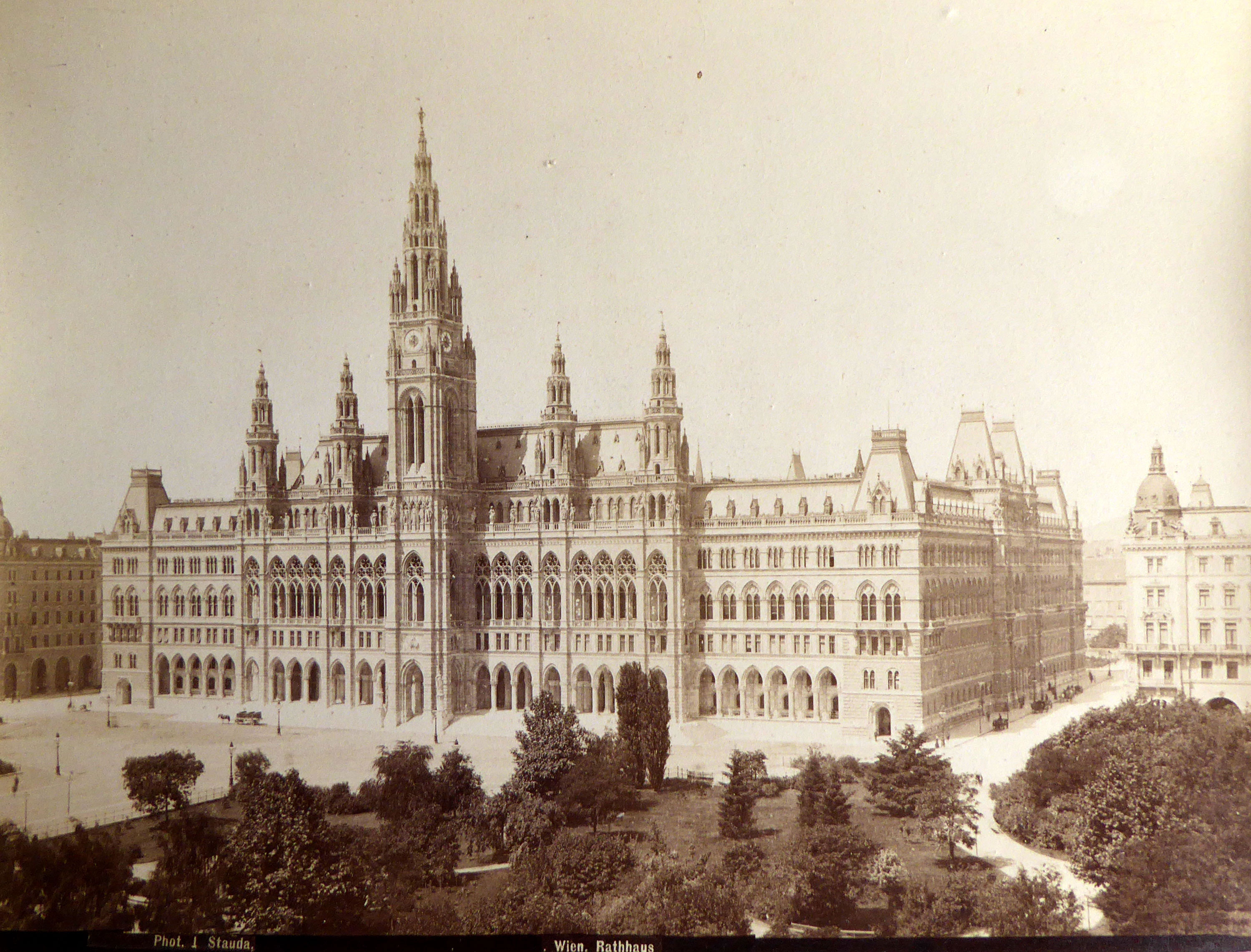
The Rathaus in 1885

Construction of the city hall commenced in May 1872. By 1873, the inner and outer perimeter walls had been completed up to street level, allowing for the ceremonial laying of the foundation stone made of lime on 14 June 1873. The final stone was placed on 12 September 1883, coinciding with the bicentennial celebration of the 1683 victory over the Ottoman invaders, marking the building's external completion. The City Council moved into the building on 23 June 1885. Construction costs amounted to a total of about 14 million florins, borne by both the City of Vienna and the Imperial-Royal (k.k.) government. The building spans a floor area of 19,592 m^{2}, with a total usable space of 113,000 m^{2}. The town hall has a floor area of 19,592 m^{2} and a total usable space of 113,000 m^{2}. It is 152 meters long and 127 meters wide, containing 1,575 rooms and 2,035 windows.

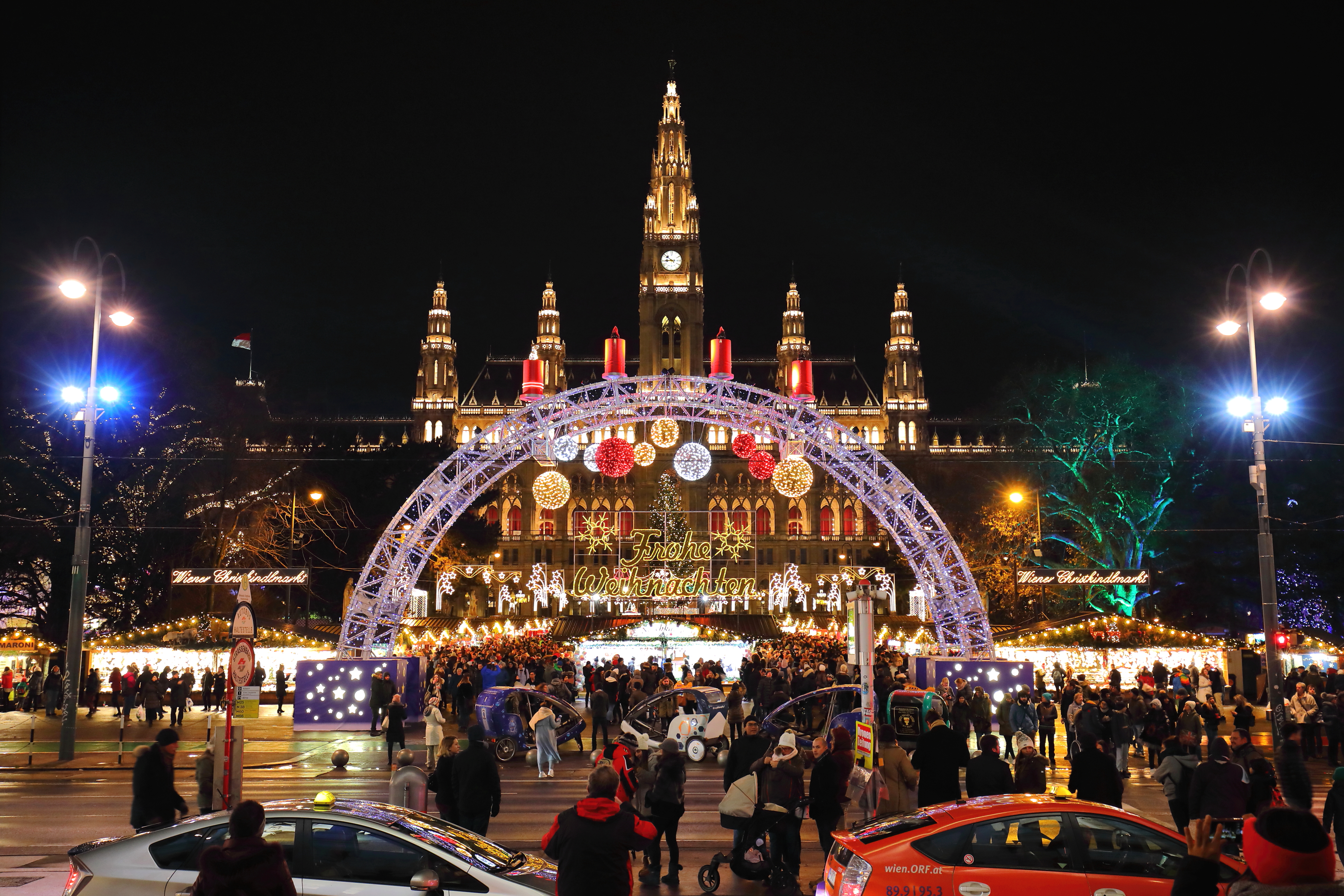
The christmas market in 2017

=== Modern history ===
During World War II, the hall sustained significant damage from bombing. The building was rebuilt by the mid-1950s, while interior renovations were finalized in the early 1970s. The tower underwent restoration between 1958 and 1959, during which a carillon was installed and first played on 31 May 1958, though it was later decommissioned. Between 1979 and 1984, the four smaller towers were restored, followed by the cleaning of the main tower’s facade from 1984 to 1988.

The ceremonial hall was fully renovated by 14 December 1999. From 2012 to 2023, the facade underwent restoration, including the refurbishment of 40,000 square meters of natural stone, as well as the replacement of doors, gates, window grilles, and stained glass. As part of the restoration, four statues on Felderstraße, destroyed during World War II, were reconstructed to depict the bourgeois professions of a printer, merchant, physician, and jurist. The building's lighting system was also upgraded to energy-efficient lamps.

== Building ==
=== Outside ===
The Rathaus is a freestanding Neo-Gothic building with Renaissance elements, located on Rathausplatz with the Rathauspark in front, consisting of two parks on either side of the square. Behind it are Florianipark and Friedrich-Schmidt-Platz, the latter housing a statue of the building's architect. On the south side, Lichtenfelsgasse contains the Mayor's residence, once used by mayors like Karl Lueger and Jakob Reumann. The Rathaus is also set to be the site of the future U2xU5 U-Bahn station.

The main facade features a central Risalit with a large tower and four smaller side towers, complemented by open arcades on the ground floor. Above the central tower entrances, three equestrian sculptures are displayed: Emperor Franz Joseph I (by Kaspar von Zumbusch) at the center, Rudolf of Habsburg (by Carl Kundmann) on the right, and Duke Rudolf IV (by Josef Gasser) on the left. Flanking the entrance are statues representing Strength and Justice, while the keystone above the entrance features a portrait of architect Friedrich von Schmidt, with colleagues Franz von Neumann and Victor Luntz. The 98-meter high tower is crowned by the Rathausmann, a symbolic figure of Vienna.

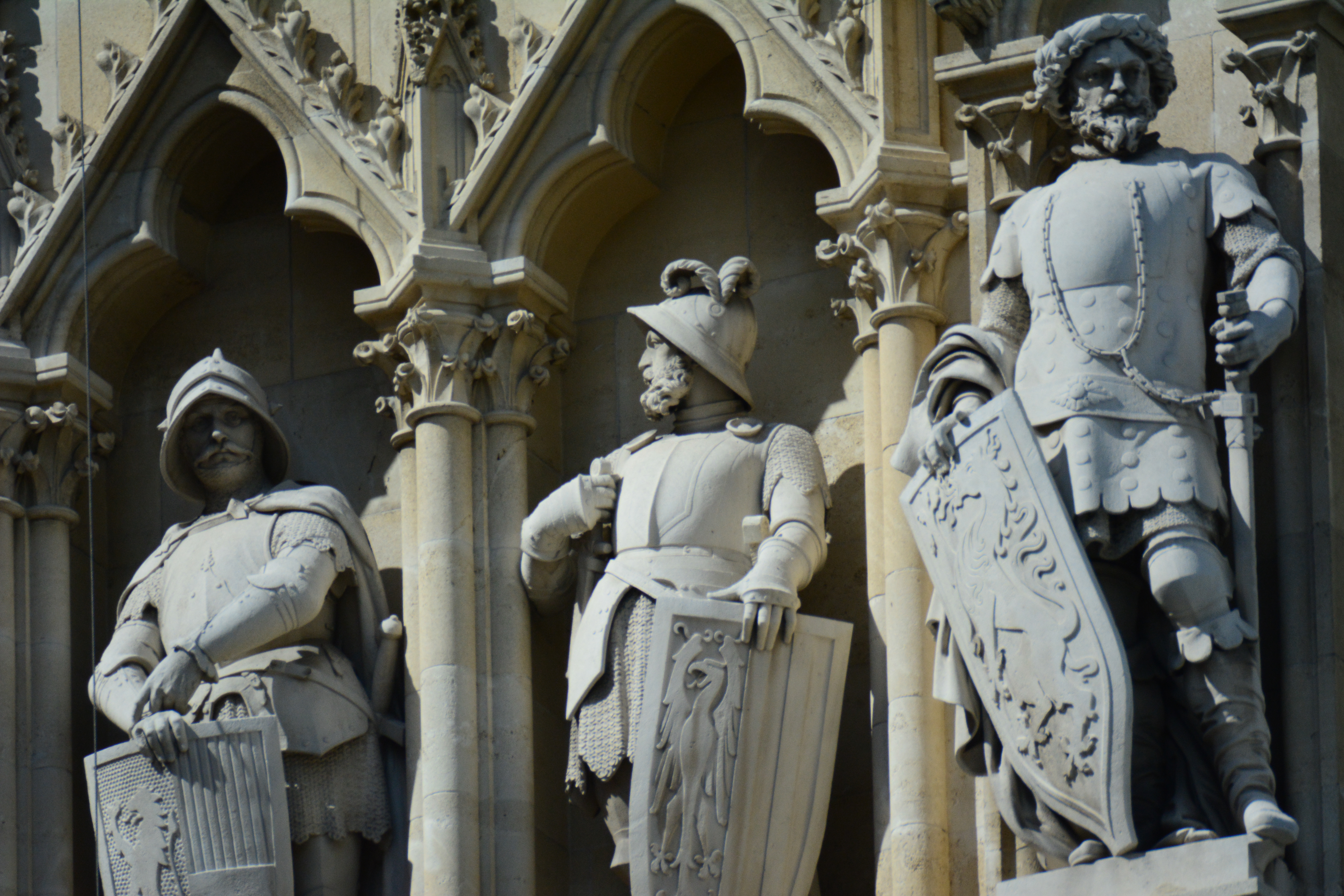
Coat of arms bearers

A statue of "Vindobona" adorns the front balustrade, flanked by banner bearers holding Vienna’s and the monarchy’s coats of arms. Eighteen statues of citizen-soldiers from various historical periods (1529–1859) are placed on either side, with additional figures holding shields bearing coats of arms from various suburbs and crown lands.

On the rear facade, a central "Vindobona" statue is flanked by allegorical figures representing Justice, Strength, Art, and Science on the right, and Wisdom, Loyalty, Education, and Charity on the left. The side facades feature statues of various professions: along Lichtenfelsgasse, they depict a carpenter, mechanic, goldsmith, musician, sculptor, architect, painter, weaponsmith, blacksmith, and shoemaker; along Felderstraße, they represent a tailor, cloth maker, merchant, printer, jurist, physician, innkeeper, brewer, baker, and butcher.

=== Inside ===
The ground floor of the Rathaus houses the Volkshalle, featuring vaulted ceilings, tracery windows, and portrait reliefs of the City Hall commission members. Side entrances lead to vestibules and grand staircases that access the ceremonial rooms on the first floor. At the rear, the Schmidthalle, originally a council vestibule with a carriage entrance, now functions as an information center.

Above the Volkshalle, the Festsaal is Austria’s largest historic hall, designed with a Renaissance-style barrel vault to avoid a church-like appearance. It includes a loggia, three galleries, orchestra niches, and relief portraits of Mozart, Haydn, Gluck, and Schubert. The hall is also decorated with ten statues of historical figures, including Nicholas von Salm, Johann Peter Frank, and Albert Kasimir von Sachsen-Teschen. In front of the hall are marble busts of Cajetan von Felder and Friedrich Schmidt, along with honor boards listing Vienna's honorary citizens.

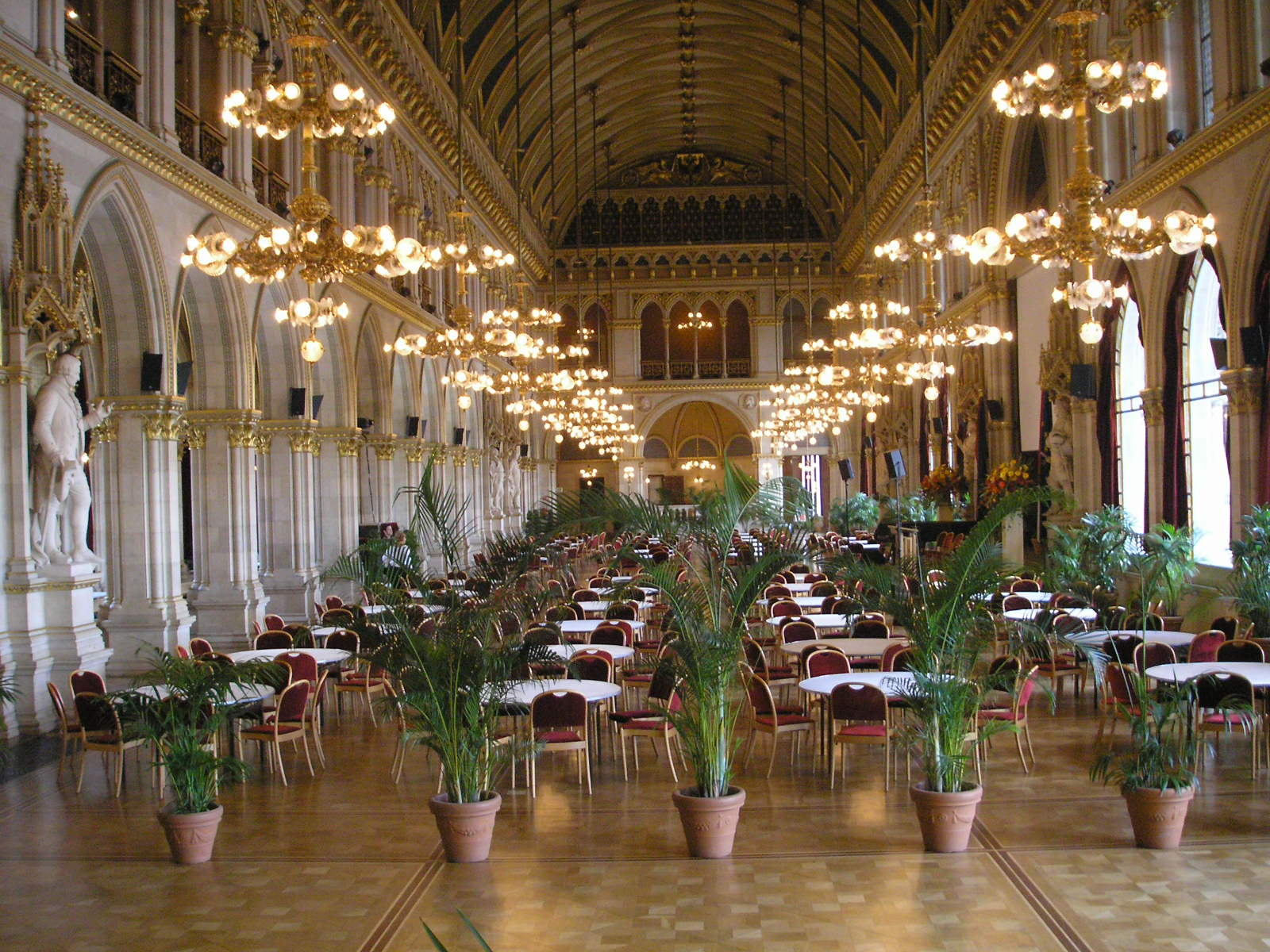
The Festsaal

The former buffet rooms flanking the Festsaal include the South Buffet, restored in 1971 and serving as the mayor's office since 1973, while the North Buffet is used for smaller events.

The first floor of the Rathaus contains the Senate Chamber, the Coat of Arms Halls, and the Council Chamber at the rear. The Senate Chamber features a richly gilded wooden coffered ceiling and a Majolica fireplace, with part of the Mayor’s Gallery displayed on the walls. The Coat of Arms Halls, restored in the early 1960s after the Vienna Museum relocated its Weapons Museum collection, are decorated with flags representing Austria's federal states in the larger hall and the state capitals in the smaller one. The Council Chamber, renovated in 1964, boasts a gilded coffered ceiling with rosettes, a large chandelier (designed by Friedrich Schmidt and exhibited at the 1878 Paris World Exposition), and frescoes depicting significant moments in Vienna's history. Memorial plaques outside commemorate events from 1805 and 1945, as well as the local politicians who died in Nazi concentration camps.

The Rathaus features seven courtyards, with the central Arcaded Courtyard being the most prominent. It hosted events during the First Republic and Nazi era, including a 1929 performance of Danton's Death by Max Reinhardt. Since the Second Republic, it has been a venue for the Vienna Festival. In 1989, the courtyard was closed to parking, landscaped, and adorned with sculptures. A café, the Arkaden-Cafe, opened in 1992. Since the 1990s, the Rathaus has been a major venue for balls, including the Refugee Balls, with the most notable being the Life Ball (1993–2019), Europe’s largest charity event for AIDS relief.

== Gallery ==
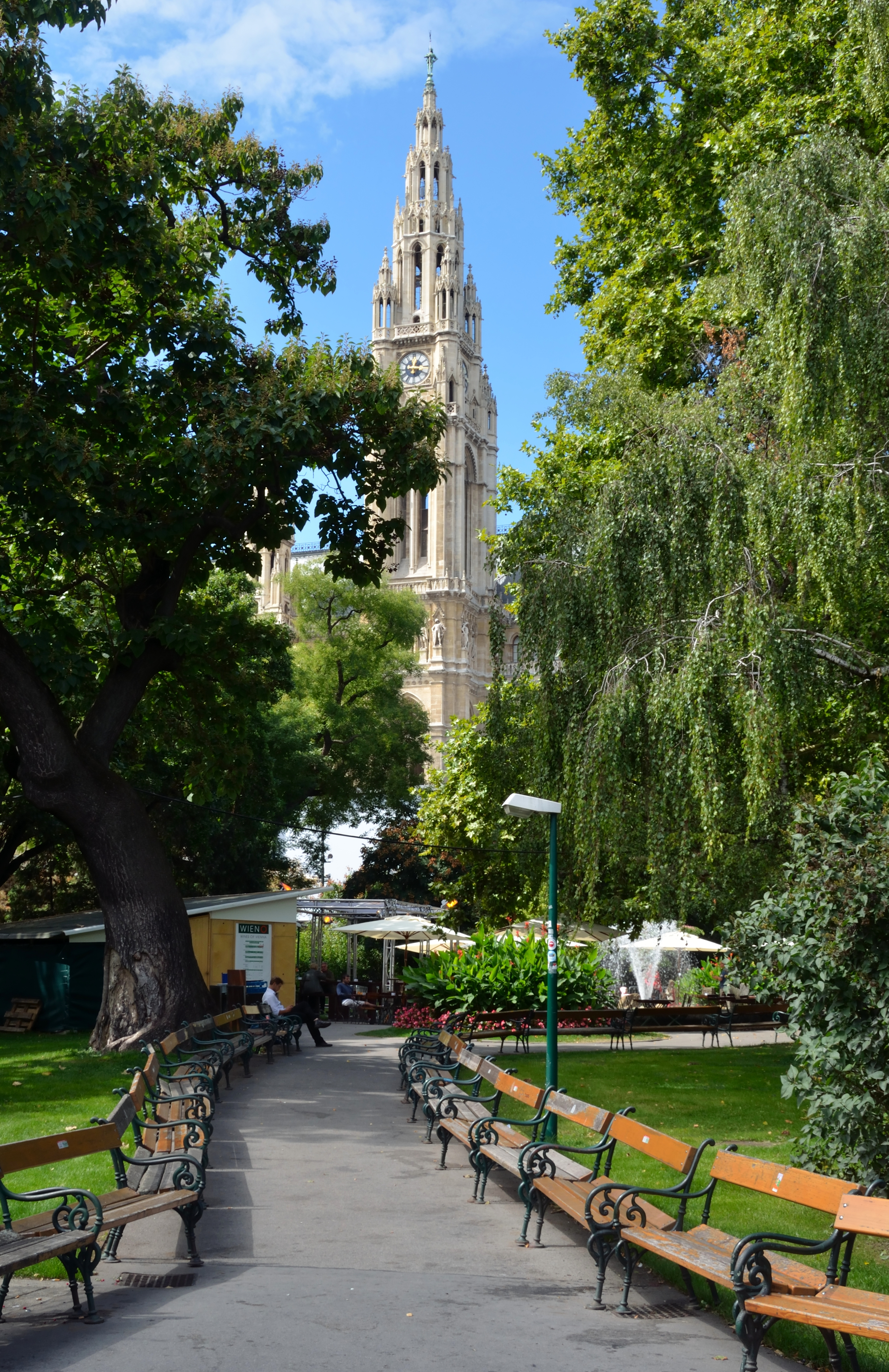
The Rathaus from the Rathauspark

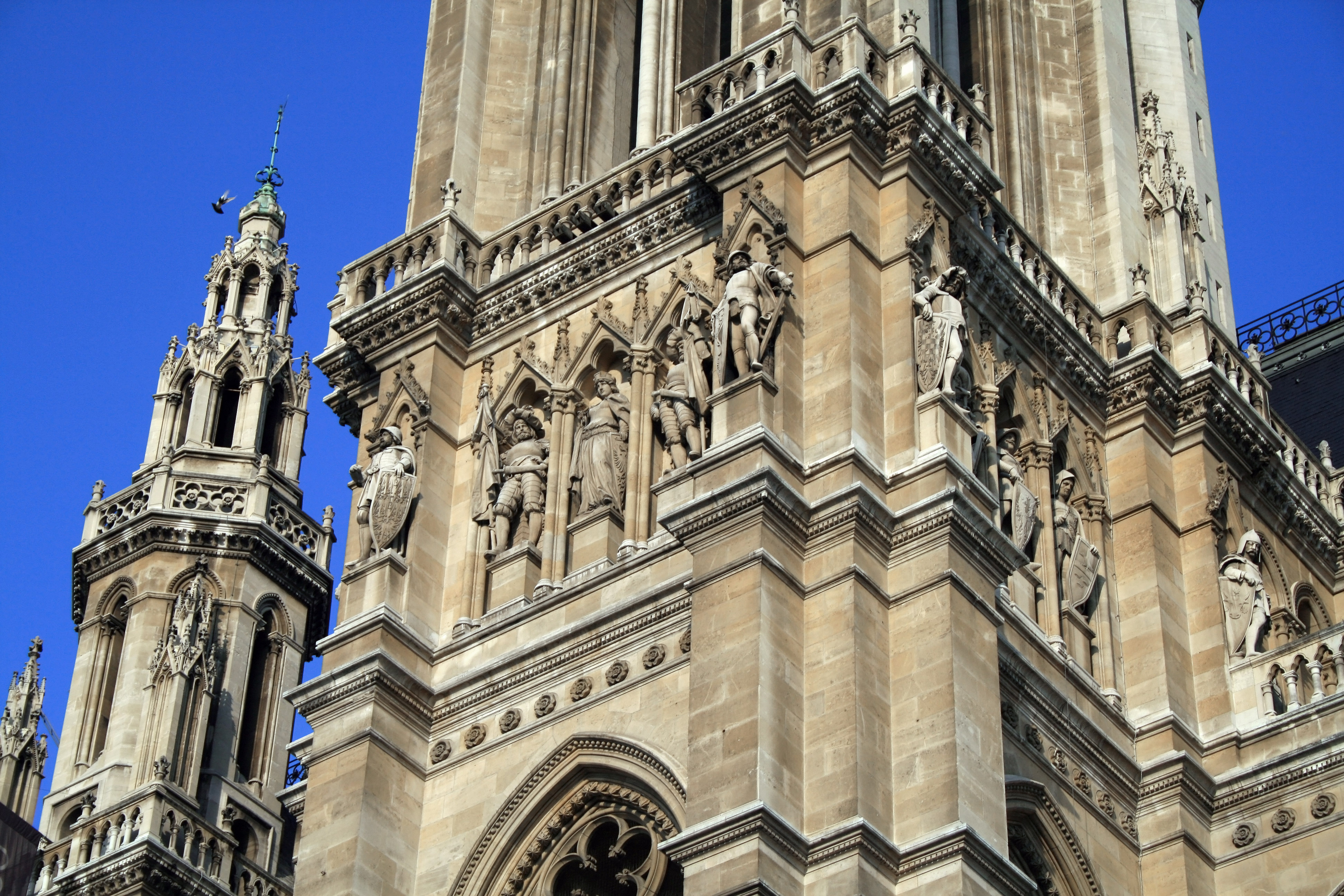
Close up of the facade

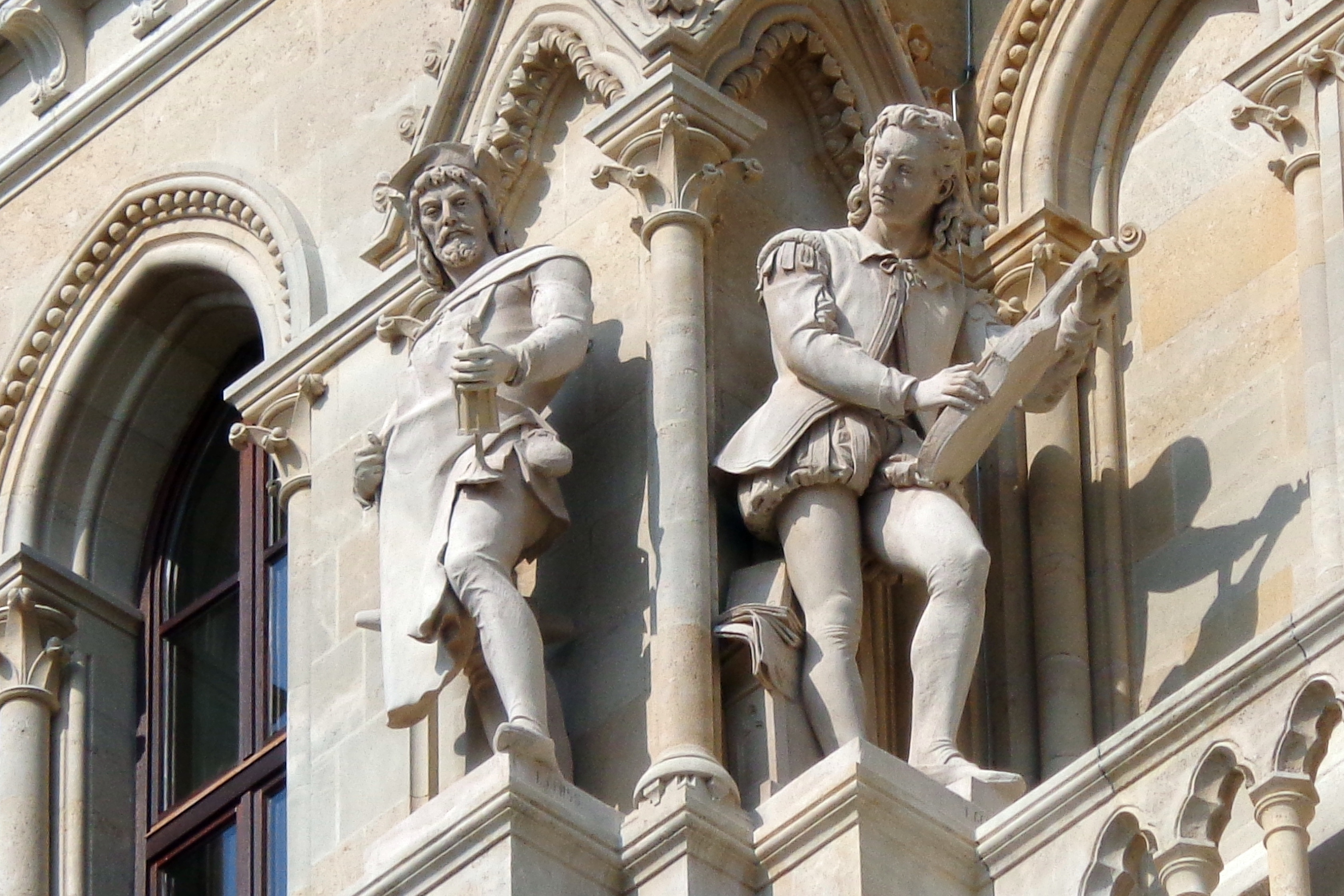
Statues of professions

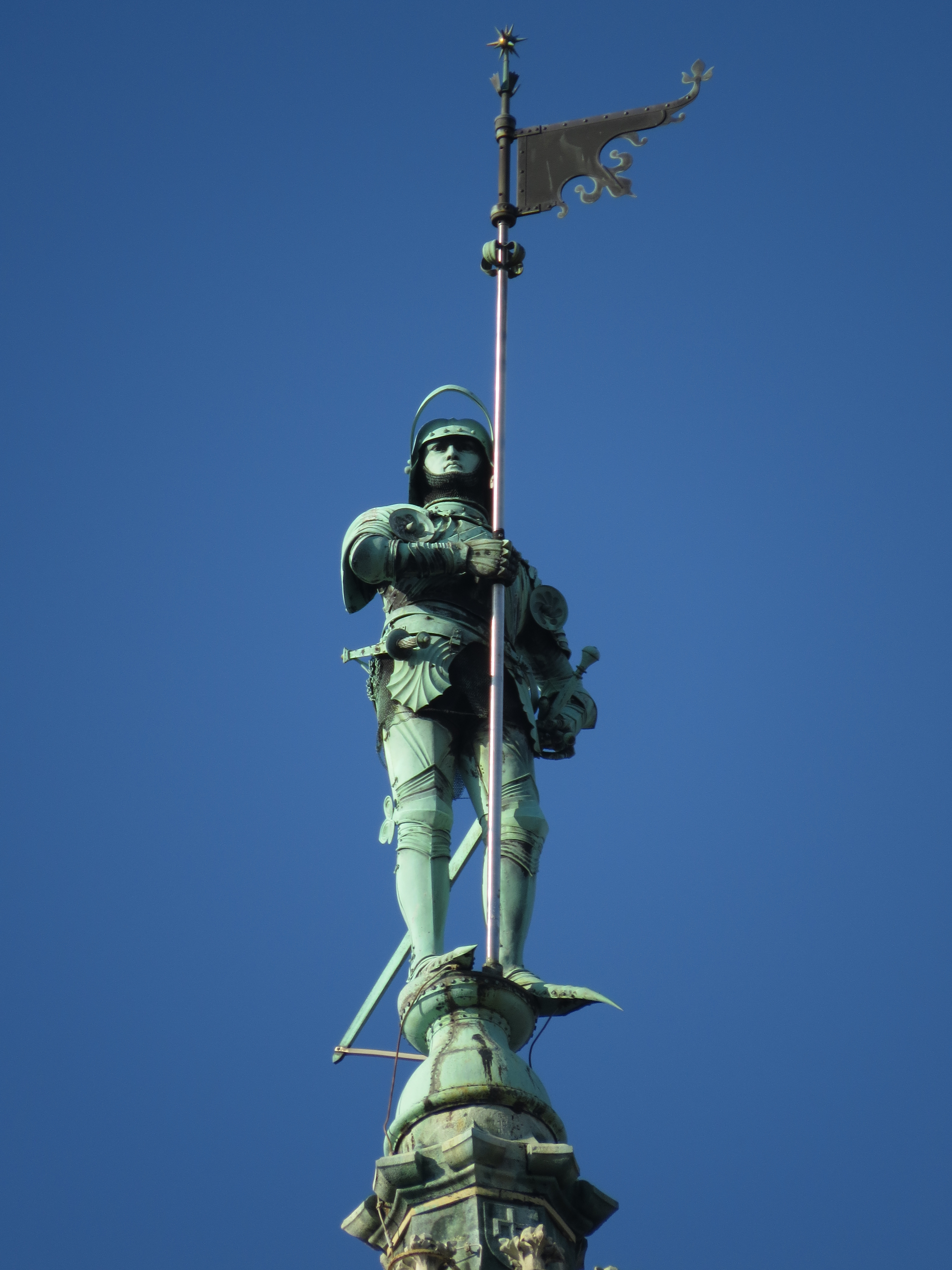
The Rathausmann

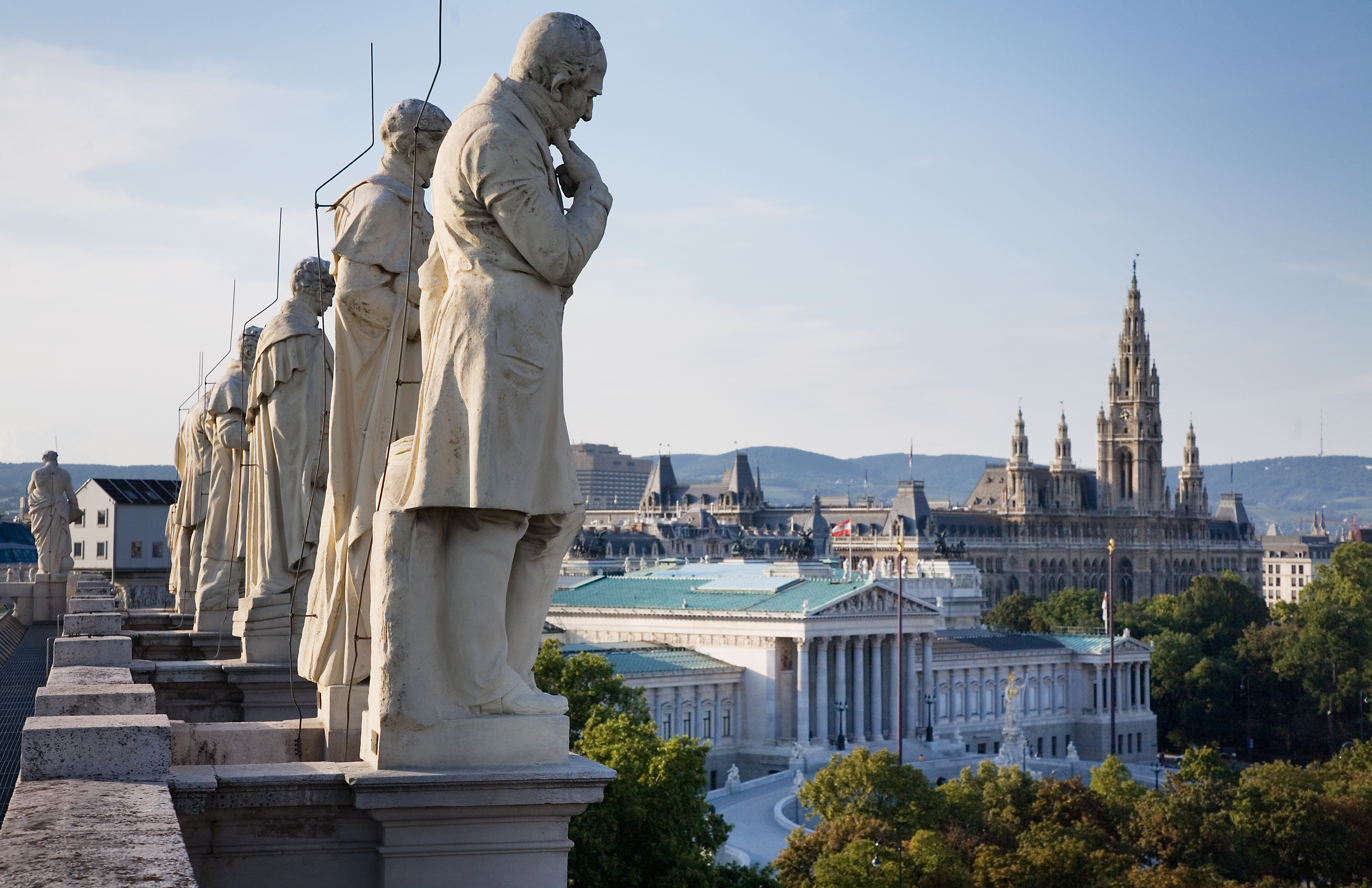
The Rathaus from the Natural History Museum with the Parliament in front

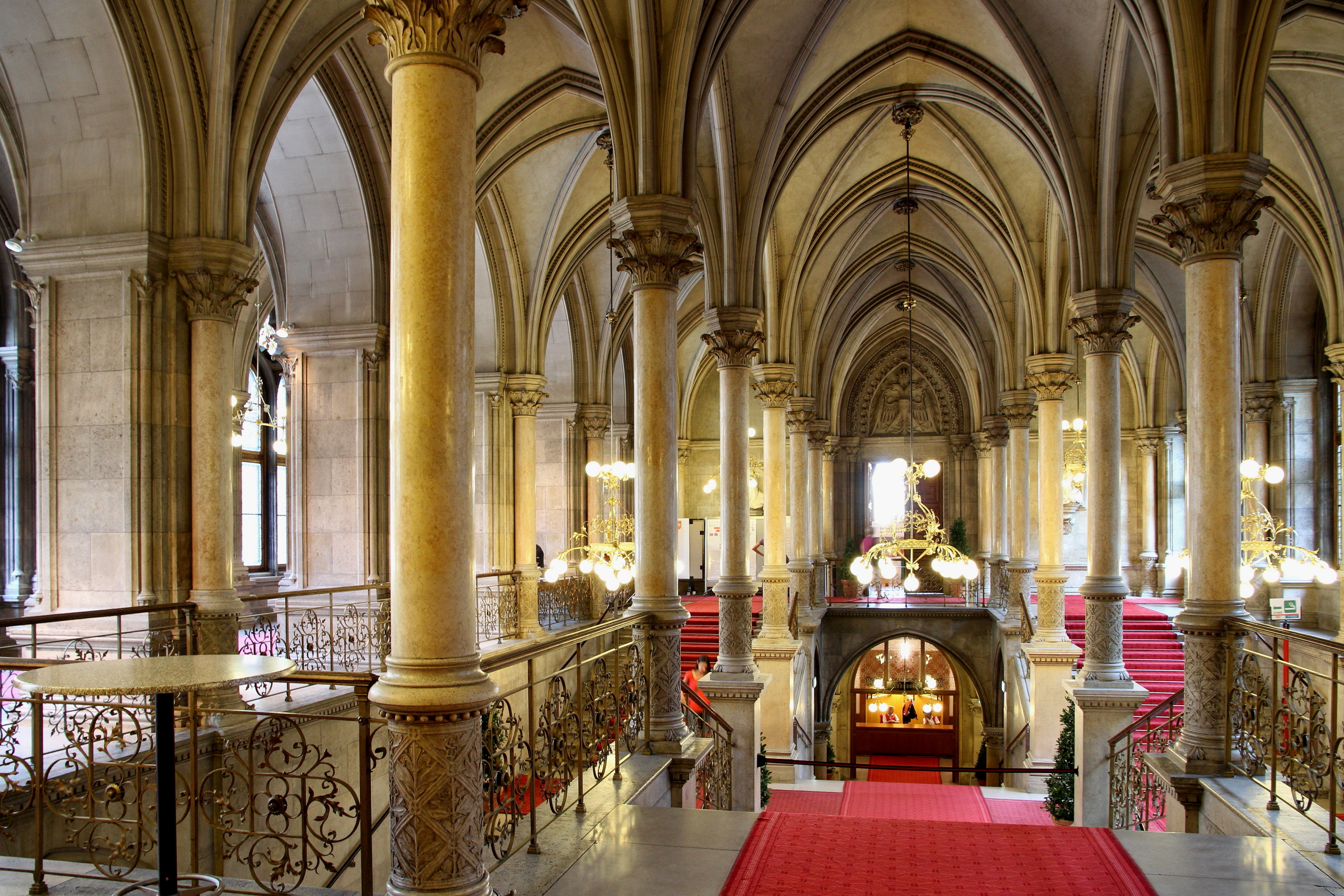
Interior

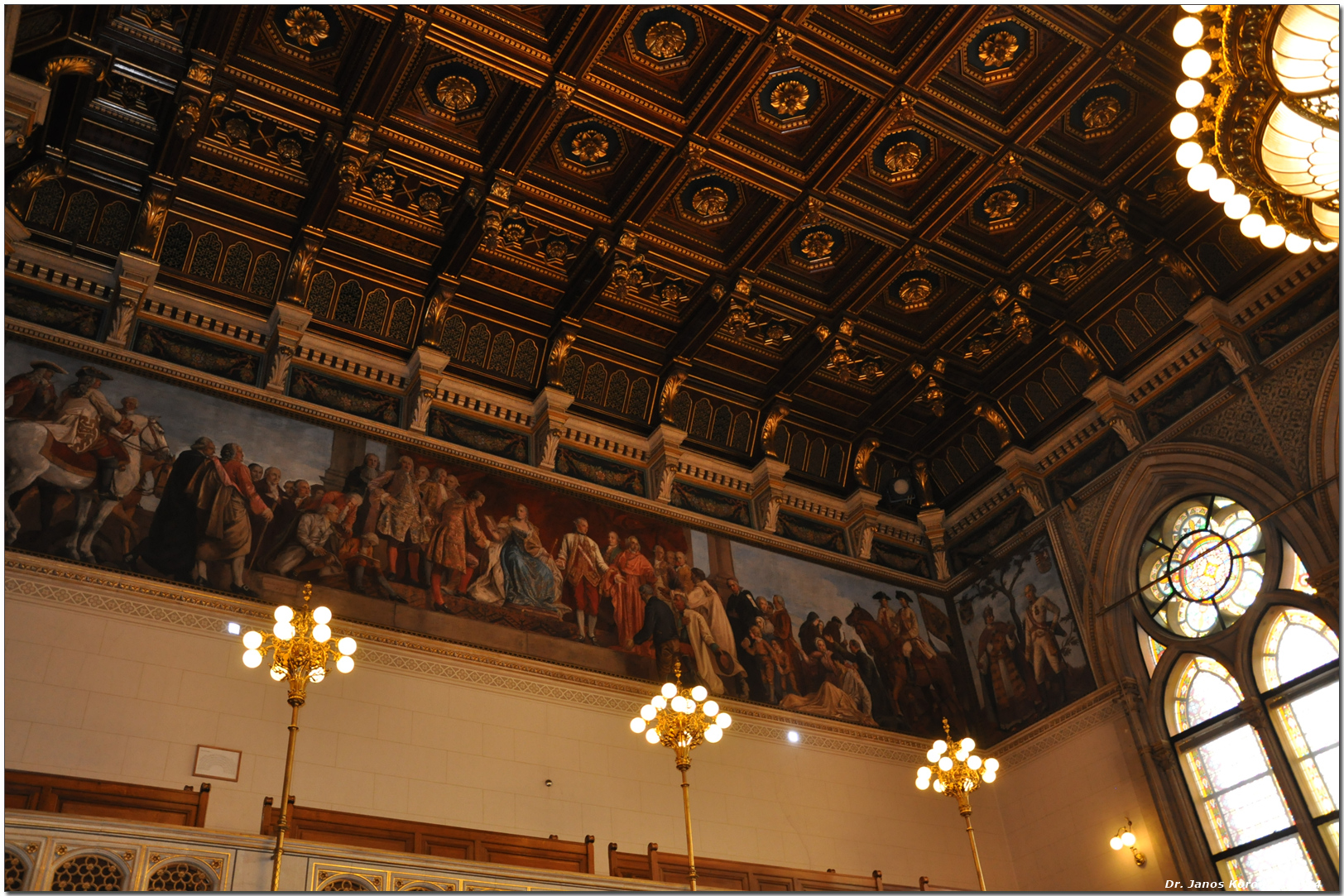
The ceiling of the Rathaus

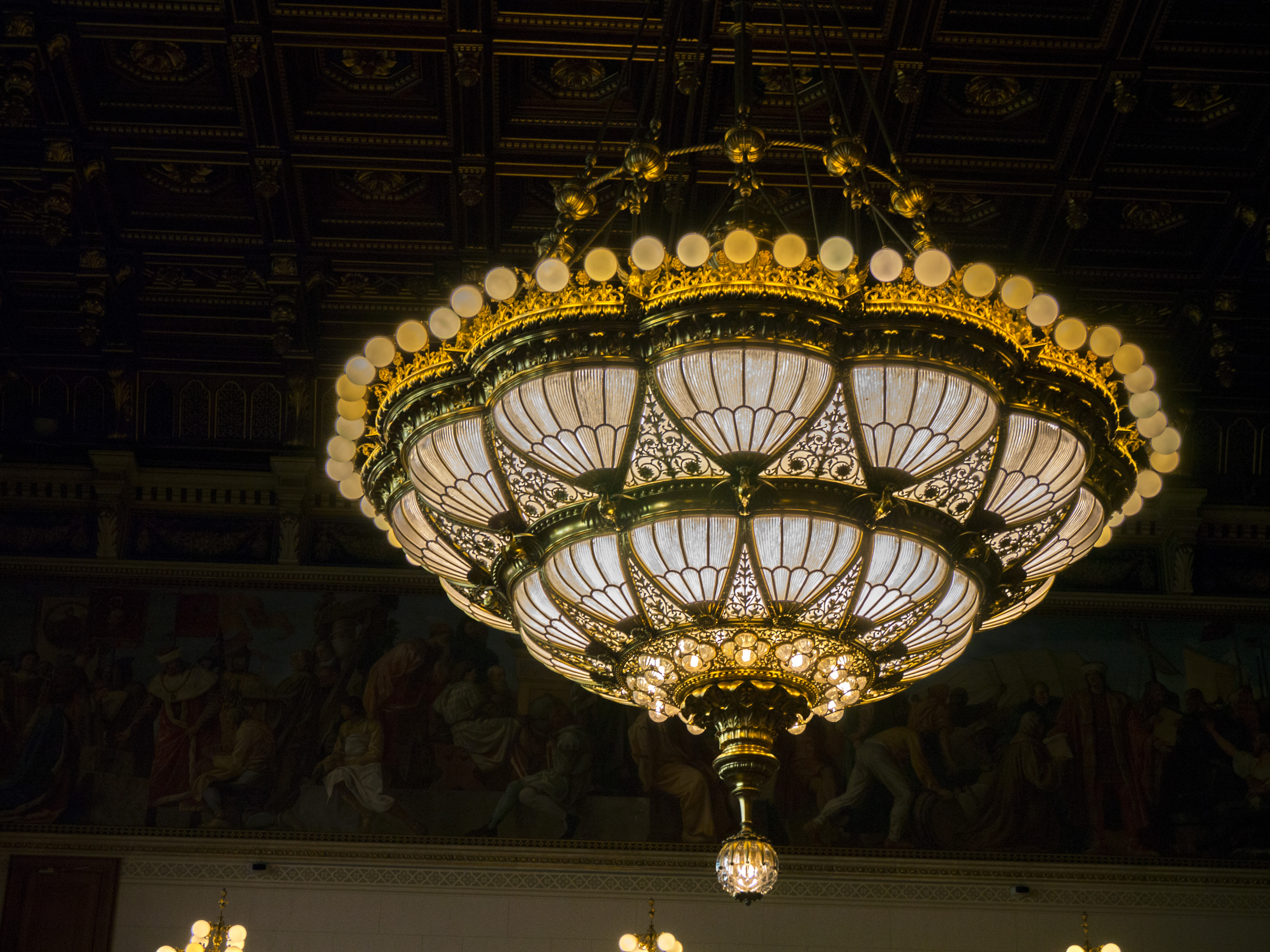
Friedrich Schmidt's chandelier

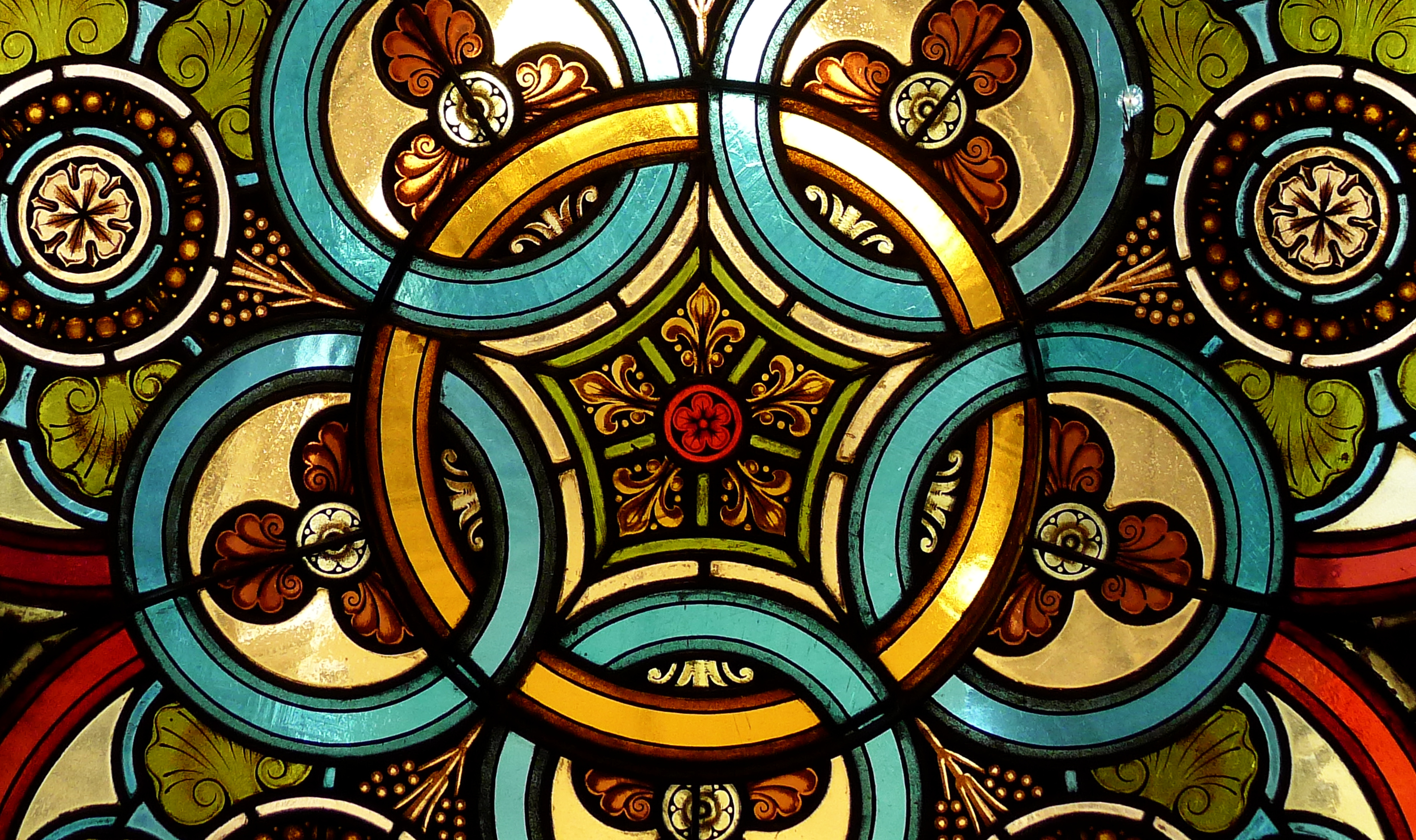
Close-up of a window

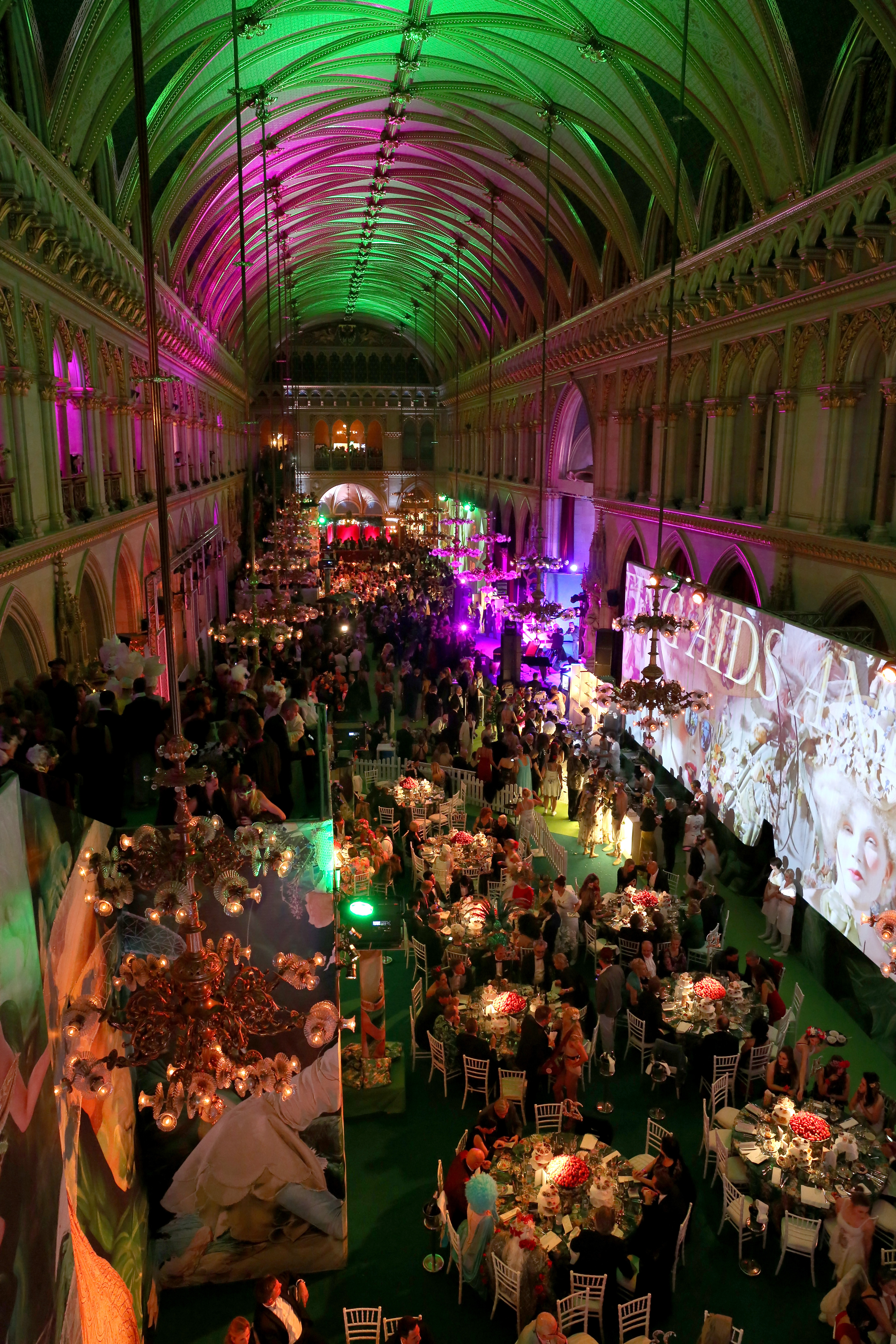
The Life Ball 2014
