= Innere Stadt =

Coordinates: 48°12′35″N 16°22′12″E

- 1st District of Vienna
- Inner City
- Coat of arms

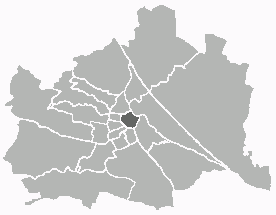
- Location of the district within Vienna
- Country: Austria
- City: Vienna

Government
  - District Director: Markus Figl (ÖVP)
  - First Deputy: Isabelle Jungnickel (ÖVP)
  - Second Deputy: Daniela Ecker-Stepp (SPÖ)
  - Representation (40 Members): ÖVP 15, SPÖ 8, Greens 6, FPÖ 5, NEOS 5, KPÖ 1

Area
  - Total: 2.88 km^{2} (1.11 sq mi)

Population (2016-01-01)
  - Total: 16,409
  - Density: 5,700/km^{2} (14,800/sq mi)
- Postal code: A-1010
- Address of District Office: Wipplingerstraße 8 A-1011 Wien
- Website: www.wien.gv.at/bezirke/innerestadt/

Innere Stadt
UNESCO World Heritage Site
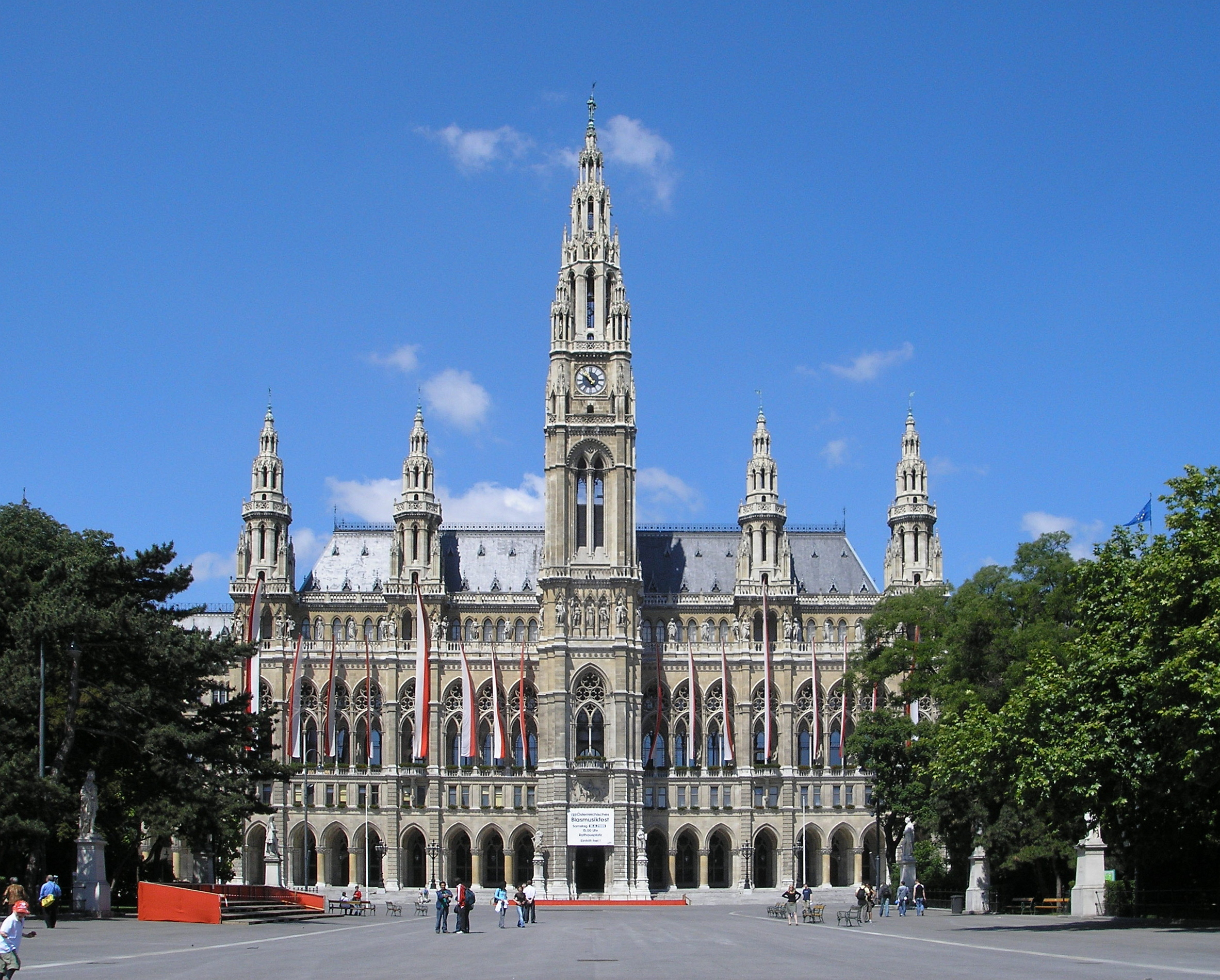
- Rathaus Vienna
- Interactive map of Innere Stadt
- Part of: Historic Centre of Vienna
- Criteria: Cultural: (ii)(iv)(vi)
- Reference: 1033
- Inscription: 2001 (25th Session)
- Endangered: 2017–...
- Area: 371 ha (1.43 sq mi)
- Buffer zone: 462 ha (1.78 sq mi)

The Innere Stadt (Austrian German pronunciation: [ˈɪnərə ˈʃtad], Viennese: Innare Stod, English: Inner City) is the 1st municipal district of Vienna (Austrian German: 1. Bezirk) located in the center of the Austrian capital. The Innere Stadt is the old town of Vienna. Until the city boundaries were expanded in 1850, the Innere Stadt was congruent with the city of Vienna. Traditionally it was divided into four quarters, which were designated after important town gates: Stubenviertel (northeast), Kärntner Viertel (southeast), Widmerviertel (southwest), Schottenviertel (northwest).

The Ringstraße circles the Innere Stadt along the route of the former city walls.

The first district is, with a workforce of 100,745, the largest employment locale in Vienna. This is partially due to tourism, as well as the presence of many corporate headquarters due to the district's central location.

== Geography ==
Innere Stadt is the central district of Vienna. It borders Leopoldstadt in the northeast, Landstraße in the east, Wieden and Mariahilf in the south, Neubau and Josefstadt in the west, and Alsergrund in the north. The district border, starting at Urania, follows Wienfluss, Lothringerstraße, Karlsplatz, Gedreidemarkt, Museumsplatz, Museumstraße, Auerspergstraße, Landesgerichtsstraße, Universitätsstraße, Maria-Theresien-Straße and the Donaukanal.

== History ==
The origins of the Innere Stadt date back to a Celtic settlement and later Roman legionary camp of Vindobona and its canabae. Until the incorporation of the suburbs in 1850, Vienna's history was largely that of today's 1st district. The Innere Stadt remained the political, economic, and spiritual centre of the city, home to Vienna City Hall, the Hofburg Palace, the official residence of the president, and St. Stephen's Cathedral, the cathedral of the Archdiocese of Vienna.

== Places of interest ==
- Albertina
- Burgtheater
- Friedrich-Schmidt-Platz
- Graben
- Hofburg Imperial Palace
- Kapuzinergruft
- Kärntner Straße
- Lutheran City Church
- Museum of Art History
- Museum of Natural History
- Maria am Gestade Church
- Palais Ephrussi
- Pestsäule (a plague column)
- Peterskirche
- Rathaus, Vienna
- Ruprechtskirche
- Schottenstift
- Stadtpark, Vienna
- Stephansdom
- Vienna State Opera
- Virgilkapelle
- Parliament Building
- Palace of Justice
- Main Building of the University of Vienna
- Volksgarten

== Demographics ==
Historical population
Year	Pop.	±%
1869	68,079	—
1880	72,688	+6.8%
1890	70,167	−3.5%
1900	58,736	−16.3%
1910	53,326	−9.2%
1923	43,045	−19.3%
1934	39,963	−7.2%
1939	33,027	−17.4%
1951	34,654	+4.9%
1961	32,243	−7.0%
1971	25,169	−21.9%
1981	19,537	−22.4%
1991	18,002	−7.9%
2001	17,056	−5.3%
2011	16,374	−4.0%
2021	15,774	−3.7%
Source: Censuses

Population has been declining ever since its peak of 73,000 in 1880, until it hit the lowest recorded value of 15,774 in 2025. Although population has been increasing slightly in early 2000s, Innere Stadt continues to remain the least populated district in Vienna.

In 2001, 28.1% of the district's population was over 60 years of age, above the city average of 22.2%. The percentage of people under 15 years of age was 9.8%. The female population of 53.3% was also above city average.

=== Origin and language ===
At 15.5%, the percentage of foreign residents in Innere Stadt was 2% under city average for the year 2001. 2.8% of the population had EU citizenship (Germany excluded), 2.7% were citizens of Serbia and Montenegro, and 2.2% were German citizens. In total, 25.6% of the population were born in a foreign country. 79% of residents listed German as their language of choice. 4.0% spoke primarily Serbian, 1.8% Hungarian, and 1.4% Croatian. 14.3% spoke other languages.

=== Religion ===
Roman Catholics made up 51.3% of the Innere Stadt population in 2001, followed by 6.6% Protestants, 5.1% Orthodox Christians, 3.3% Jews. 22.7% were listed as non-confessional.

== Politics ==
The Bezirksvorsteher (district director) has been a member of the conservative ÖVP since 1946. Former Bezirksvorsteher Ursula Stenzel has spoken out against holding events in the city, citing concerns regarding noise pollution. Her comments have drawn criticism from other parties, especially the social democratic SPÖ.

District Directors from 1945
Theodor Köpl (KPÖ)	April 1945–August 1945
Fritz Schuckeld (SPÖ)	August 1945–October 1945
Adolf Planek (SPÖ)	October 1945 – 1946
August Altmutter (ÖVP)	1946–1948
Franz Eichberger (ÖVP)	1948–1951
Otto Friesinger (ÖVP)	1951–1968
Heinrich Anton Heinz (ÖVP)	1968–1987
Richard Schmitz (ÖVP)	1987–2001
Franz Grundwalt (ÖVP)	2001–2005
Ursula Stenzel (ÖVP)	2005–2015
Markus Figl (ÖVP)	2015–

== Coat of arms ==
The first district's coat of arms is a white cross on a red background. It is also the coat of arms for the City of Vienna and the State of Vienna. The current coat of arms dates back to around 1270, when it first appeared on the minted "Wiener Pfennige" coins. It may have been based on the flag of the King of the Romans' forces during the Middle Ages, as the combat flag of Rudolph I of Germany featured a similar design.
