= Rudolf Kramer =

Austrian cyclist

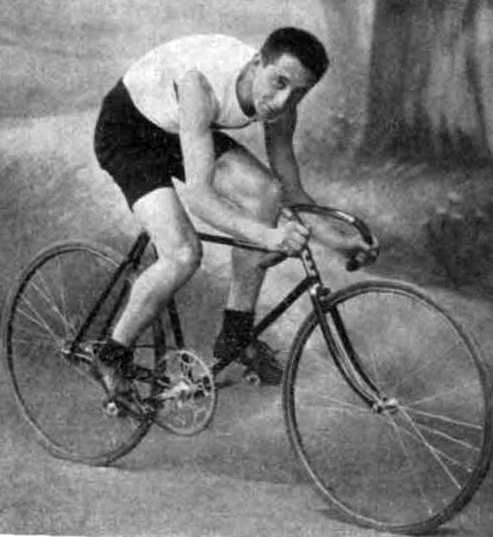
- Rudolf Kramer (1911)

Personal information
- Born: 17 January 1886 Vienna, Austria

Cycling career
- Sport: Cycling

Rudolf Kramer (born 17 January 1886, date of death unknown) was an Austrian road racing cyclist who competed in the 1912 Summer Olympics. He was born in Vienna.

In 1912, he was a member of the Austrian cycling team, which finished seventh in the team time trial event. In the individual time trial competition he finished 43rd.
