= Josef Hellensteiner =

Austrian cyclist

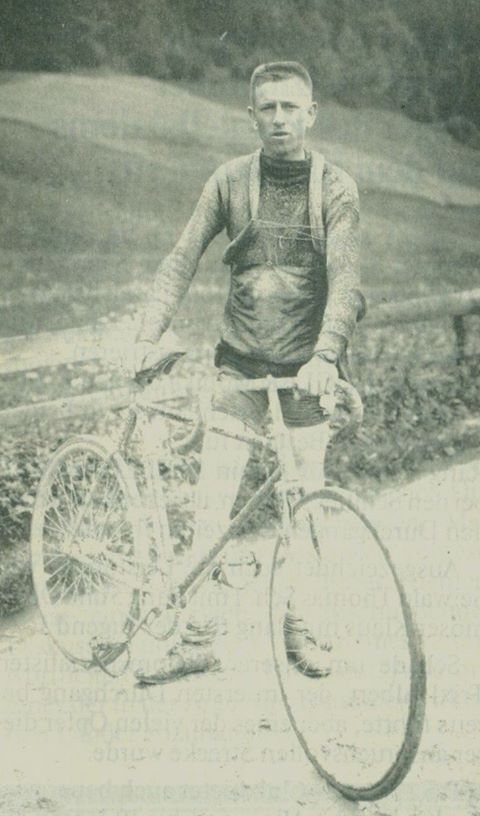
- Hellensteiner Josef taking a cycling course

Personal information
- Born: 26 October 1889 Tyrol, Austria-Hungary
- Died: 7 December 1980 (aged 91) St. Johann in Tirol, Austria

Cycling career
- Sport: Cycling

Josef Hellensteiner (26 October 1889 – 7 December 1980) was an Austrian road racing cyclist who competed in the 1912 Summer Olympics. He was born in Tyrol, Austria-Hungary and died in St. Johann in Tirol, Austria.

In 1912, he was a member of the Austrian cycling team, which finished seventh in the team time trial event. In the individual time trial competition he finished 45th.
