= Ursula Stenzel =

Austrian politician (born 1945)

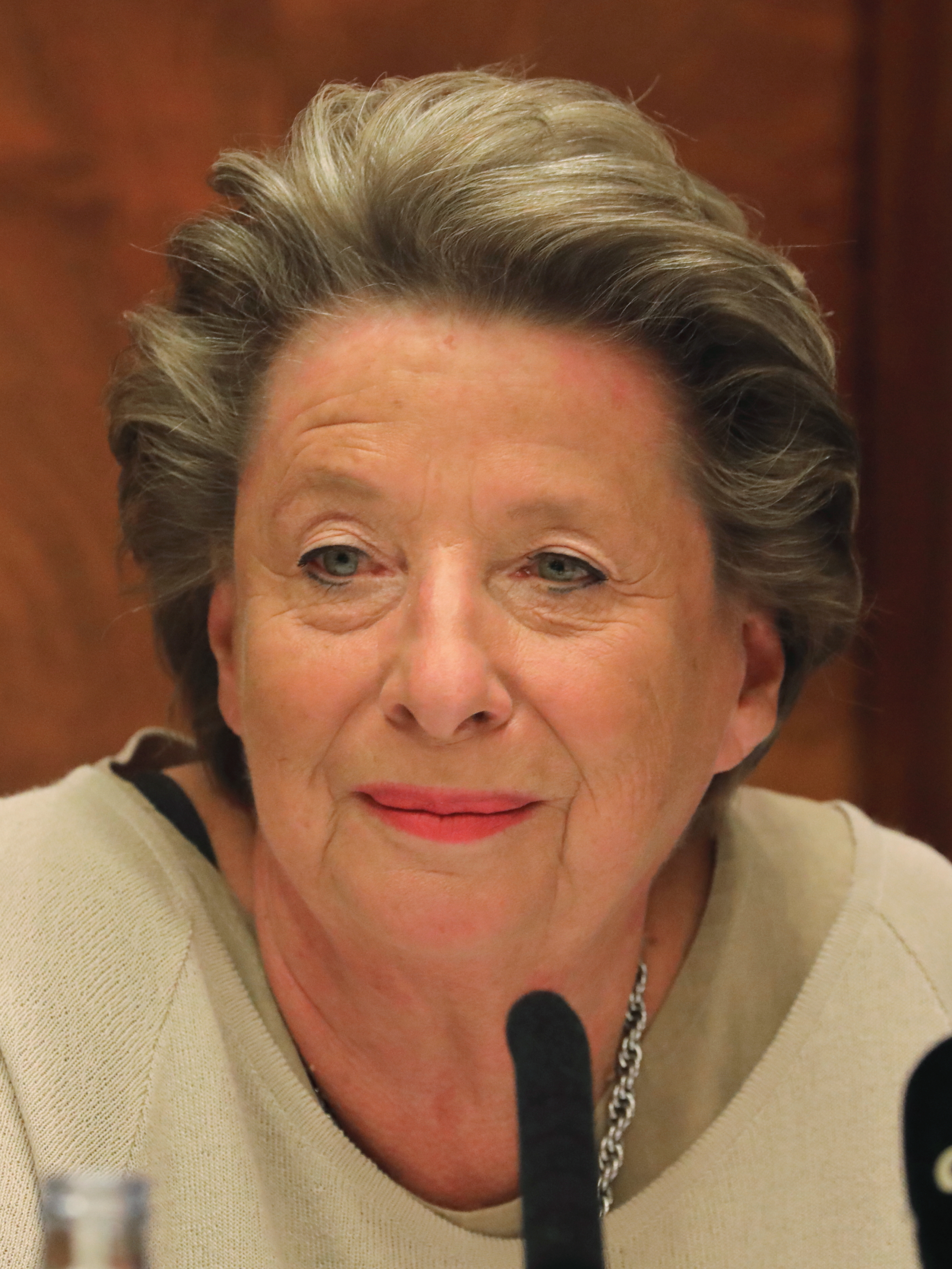
Ursula Stenzel

Ursula Stenzel (born 22 September 1945 in Leopoldstadt, Vienna) is an Austrian politician who was a Member of the European Parliament (MEP) from 1996 to 2006. Until September 2015, she was a member of the Austrian People's Party. She was also a former member of the bureau of the European People's Party, and sat on the European Parliament's Committee on Foreign Affairs.

As MEP, she was also chair of the delegation for relations with the Korean Peninsula, a member of the Subcommittee on Security and Defence, and a substitute for the Committee on Budgetary Control and the Committee on Employment and Social Affairs.

Stenzel has been Bezirksvorsteherin (district mayor) of Innere Stadt, Vienna's 1st district and old town, from 2005 until she stepped down in 2015. Her successor as district mayor is Markus Figl (ÖVP).

== Family ==
Stenzel was born in a Catholic family of Jewish descent. Her father was engineer of the North railway, Stenzels mother was the daughter of a hazzan and granddaughter of a rabbi, both from the synagogue in the Rotensterngasse in Leopoldstadt, the second municipal district of Vienna.

== Career ==
- Studied journalism, political science and modern history
- Journalist and presenter at ORF (1972–1999)
- Member of the European Parliament
- Delegation member, EU-Poland Joint Parliamentary Committee (1997–2002)
- Delegation Chair, EU-Czech Republic Joint Parliamentary Committee (2002–2004)
- Schuman Prize

== Controversies ==
=== Protests against about fixed closing hours ===
Stenzel has been criticised by local and national artists for her conservative positions, most notably for her outspoken support of the introduction of a closing time in Vienna's 1'st district ("Innere Stadt"). In answer to Stenzels proposal, a number of Viennese club owners and deejays created a cover version of the Duck Sauce hit single "Barbra Streisand" which also included a satirical video titled Ursula stress ned (Ursula don't stress). The single became widely popular within days and the video quickly went viral on YouTube.

=== Switch to Austrian Freedom Party ===
Shortly before the Viennese municipal election of 2015, the Viennese regional administration of the Austrian People's Party (ÖVP) decided that it would not endorse Stenzel as district mayor for another term. In reaction, Stenzel left the Christian democratic and conservative ÖVP to join the right-wing populist and national-conservative Freedom Party of Austria (FPÖ). However, as the ÖVP managed to keep her relative majority in the first district (despite losing 12,27% of their voters from the elections in 2010) and the FPÖ only coming in third, Stenzel had to step down as district mayor and was succeeded by Markus Figl from the ÖVP.
