= Ragnar Malm =

Swedish cyclist

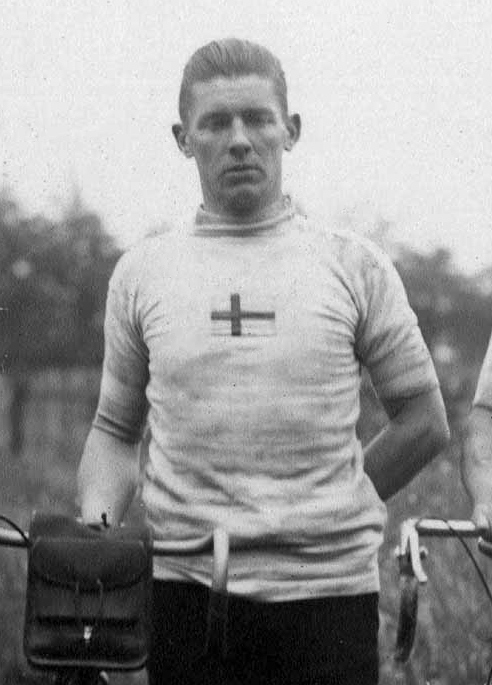
- Malm at the 1920 Olympics

Personal information
- Full name: Karl Oscar Ragnar Malm
- Born: 14 May 1893 Stockholm, Sweden
- Died: 1 March 1959 (aged 65) Uppsala, Sweden

Sport
- Sport: Cycling
- Club: Söderbrunns IS, Stockholm; IF Thor, Uppsala
Medal record
Men's road bicycle racing
Representing Sweden
Olympic Games
Gold medal – first place	1912 Stockholm	Team road race
Silver medal – second place	1920 Antwerp	Team road race
Bronze medal – third place	1924 Paris	Team road race

Karl Oscar Ragnar Malm (14 May 1893 – 1 March 1959) was a Swedish road racing cyclist. He competed at the 1912, 1920 and 1924 Summer Olympics and won a team gold, silver and bronze medal, respectively. His best individual result was seventh place in 1920. Nationally, he won the road time trial 10 times, individually (1912, 1917–18 and 1920–1922) and with a team (1913, 1918–1920).
