= Hjalmar Väre =

Finnish cyclist

Personal information
- Full name: Hjalmar Väre
- Born: 22 July 1892 Vihti, Finland
- Died: 20 March 1952 (aged 59) Turku, Finland

Cycling career
- Sport: Cycling

Frans Albert Hjalmar Väre (22 July 1892 – 20 March 1952) was a Finnish road racing cyclist who competed in the 1912 Summer Olympics. He was born in Vihti and died in Turku.

In 1912, he was a member of the Finnish cycling team, which finished fifth in the team time trial event. In the individual time trial competition he finished 66th.
