= Adolf Kofler =

Austrian cyclist

Personal information
- Born: 12 January 1892 Graz, Austria
- Died: 13 March 1915 (aged 23) Bolzano-Bozen, Italy

Cycling career
- Sport: Cycling

Adolf Kofler (12 January 1892 – 13 March 1915) was an Austrian road racing cyclist who competed in the 1912 Summer Olympics.

He was born in Graz. In 1912, he was a member of the Austrian cycling team, which finished seventh in the team time trial event. In the individual time trial competition he finished 31st. He was killed in action during World War I.

== See also ==
- List of Olympians killed in World War I
