= Georg Warsow =

German cyclist (1877–1965)

Personal information
- Full name: Georg Karl Gustav Warsow
- Born: 22 September 1877 Bütow, Germany (today Bytów, Poland)
- Died: 30 November 1965 (aged 88) Beuel, West Germany

Cycling career
- Sport: Cycling

Georg Warsow (22 September 1877 – 30 November 1965) was a German road racing cyclist who competed in the 1912 Summer Olympics. He was born in Bütow.

In 1912, he was a member of the German cycling team, which finished sixth in the team time trial event. In the individual time trial competition he finished 36th.
