= Charles Hansen (cyclist) =

Danish cyclist

Personal information
- Born: 23 April 1891 Copenhagen, Denmark

Cycling career
- Sport: Cycling

Charles Carl Hans Hansen (23 April 1891 – after 1912) was a Danish road racing cyclist who competed in the 1912 Summer Olympics. He was born in Copenhagen.

In 1912, he was a member of the Danish cycling team, which finished eighth in the team time trial event. In the individual time trial competition he finished 32nd.
