= Kankkonen =

Surname list

Kankkonen is a surname. Notable people with the surname include:

- Anssi Kankkonen (born 1968), Finnish golfer
- Johan Kankkonen (1886–1955), Finnish road racing cyclist
- Veikko Kankkonen (born 1940), Finnish ski jumper

== See also ==
- Kakkonen
