= Markus Figl =

Austrian politician (1973-)

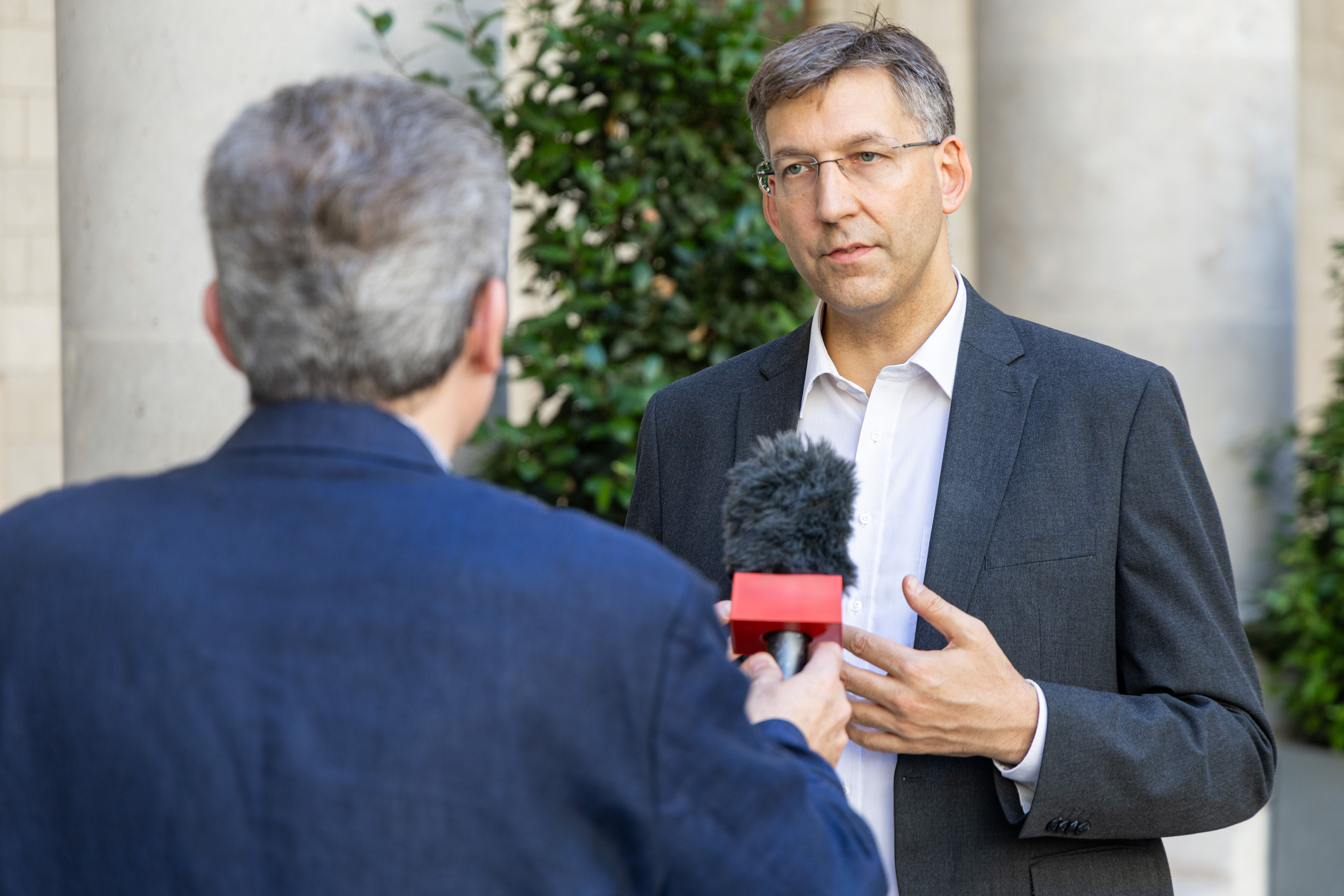
- Figl in 2025

Chairman of the People's Party of Vienna
- Incumbent
- Assumed office 28 April 2025
- Preceded by: Karl Mahrer

District mayor of the Innere Stadt
- Incumbent
- Assumed office 22 December 2015
- Preceded by: Ursula Stenzel

Personal details
- Born: 14 November 1973 (age 52) Vienna, Austria
- Party: ÖVP
- Relations: Leopold Figl (granduncle)

Markus Figl (born 14 November 1973, Vienna) is an Austrian politician. He is the chairman of the Vienna People's Party (ÖVP), as well as district mayor of Vienna's first district, the Innere Stadt.

== Career ==
In 1999, after studying law and political science, Figl became a parliamentary aide to Michael Spindelegger, and worked with him during his roles as Second President of the National Council, Foreign Minister, and Finance Minister. Figl also served as chairman of the Young People's Party in the Innere Stadt.

He served as deputy district chairman under district mayor Ursula Stenzel from 2005 to 2010, when he was dismissed by Stenzel. This move was unpopular within the ÖVP, and he was elected chairman of the district party the following year. For the 2015 Viennese elections, he was chosen as the party's lead candidate in the district. He won the election and has served as district head since then.

Following the 2025 Viennese elections, in which the ÖVP received only 9.7% of the vote and finished in fifth place, Figl replaced Karl Mahrer as state party chairman of the Vienna ÖVP on an interim basis. He was then formally elected by the party in September 2025 with 86% of the vote. He stepped down as head of the ÖVP in the Innere Stadt while remaining district mayor.

== Personal life ==
Figl's great-uncle is Leopold Figl, Austria's first chancellor after World War II.
