= Rudolf Baier =

German cyclist

Personal information
- Born: 22 March 1892 Dresden, German Empire
- Died: 21 October 1945 (aged 53) Dresden, Soviet occupation zone in Germany

Cycling career
- Sport: Cycling

Rudolf Baier (22 March 1892 – 21 October 1945) was a German road racing cyclist who competed in the 1912 Summer Olympics.

In 1912, he was a member of the German cycling team, which finished sixth in the team time trial event. In the individual time trial competition he finished 27th.
