= Johannes Reinwaldt =

Danish cyclist

Personal information
- Born: 14 May 1890 Copenhagen, Denmark
- Died: 28 June 1958 (aged 68) Copenhagen, Denmark

Cycling career
- Sport: Cycling

Johannes Ferdinand Reinwaldt (14 May 1890 – 28 June 1958) was a Danish road racing cyclist who competed in the 1912 Summer Olympics. He was born and died in Copenhagen.

In 1912, he was a member of the Danish cycling team, which finished eighth in the team time trial event. In the individual time trial competition he finished 48th.
