= Alvin Loftes =

American cyclist (1890–1971)

Personal information
- Full name: Alvin Hjalmar Loftes
- Born: January 1, 1890 Providence, Rhode Island, U.S.
- Died: July 1971 (aged 81) Narragansett, Rhode Island, U.S.

Cycling career
- Sport: Cycling
Medal record
Men's road bicycle racing
Representing the United States
Olympic Games
Bronze medal – third place	1912 Stockholm	Team road race

Alvin Hjalmar "Al" Loftes (January 1, 1890 – July 1971) was an American road racing cyclist who competed in the 1912 Summer Olympics.

He was part of the team that won the bronze medal in the Team road race. He finished eleventh in the individual road race.
