= Vilho Tilkanen =

Finnish cyclist (1885–1945)

Personal information
- Full name: Vilho Tilkanen
- Born: 14 April 1885 Karinainen, Finland
- Died: 1 August 1945 (aged 60) Karinainen, Finland

Cycling career
- Sport: Cycling

Vilho Oskari Tilkanen (14 April 1885 – 1 August 1945) was a Finnish road racing cyclist who competed in the 1912 Summer Olympics. He was born and died in Karinainen.

In 1912, he was a member of the Finnish cycling team, which finished fifth in the team time trial event. In the individual time trial competition he finished 21st.
