= Axel Persson =

Swedish cyclist (1888–1955)

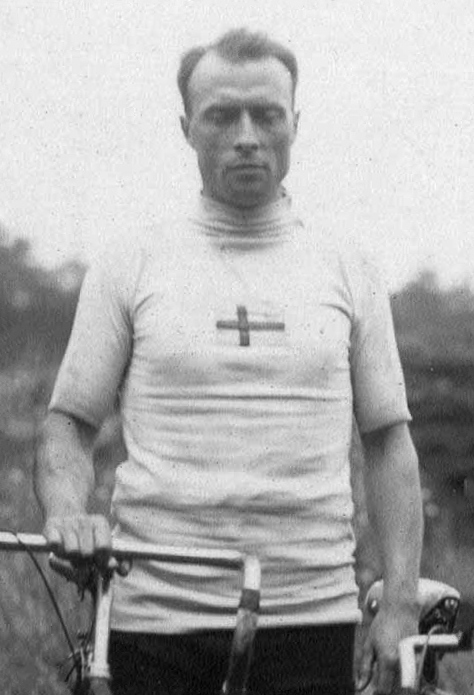
- Persson at the 1920 Olympics

Personal information
- Born: 23 January 1888 Eskilstuna, Sweden
- Died: 2 September 1955 (aged 67) Västerhaninge, Sweden

Sport
- Sport: Cycling
- Event: Road
- Club: SK Iter, Stockholm; Upsala CK
Medal record
Representing Sweden
Olympic Games
Gold medal – first place	1912 Stockholm	Team road race
Silver medal – second place	1920 Antwerp	Team road race

Axel Wilhelm Persson (23 January 1888 – 2 September 1955) was a Swedish cyclist. He competed in the road race at the 1912 and 1920 Summer Olympics and won a gold and a silver medal with the Swedish teams. Individually he finished 9th and 12th, respectively.

Person won nine to eleven Swedish titles on the road and track in both sprint and long-distance events. In 1919, he also became the Scandinavian champion in the road race.
