= William Hammond (cyclist) =

English cyclist

Personal information
- Full name: William Robert Hammond
- Born: 2 July 1886 Eastbourne, England
- Died: 13 January 1960 (aged 73) Coventry, England

Cycling career
- Sport: Cycling
- Discipline: Road
- Role: Rider
Medal record
Representing Great Britain
Men's road bicycle racing
Olympic Games
Silver medal – second place	1912 Stockholm	Team road race

William Robert Hammond (2 July 1886 – 13 January 1960) was a British road racing cyclist who competed in the 1912 Summer Olympics.

He was born in Eastbourne, Sussex England, and was part of the team which won the silver medal in the Team road race. In the individual road race he finished 22nd.

Hammond was the son of David Hammond, a painter, and Emily, a laundress. At 15, he was a compass maker in Bexleyheath, Kent.
