= Erik Friborg =

Swedish cyclist

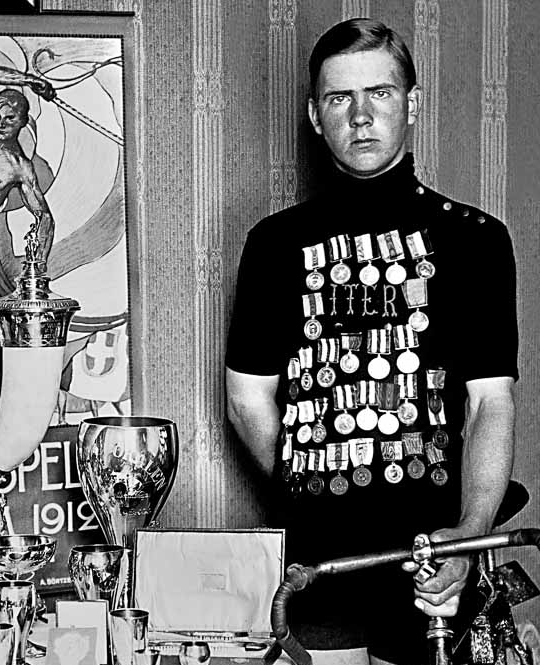
- Friborg in 1912

Personal information
- Born: 24 January 1893 Stockholm, Sweden
- Died: 22 May 1968 (aged 75) Hounslow, Greater London, Great Britain

Sport
- Sport: Cycling
- Event: Road
- Club: SK Iter, Stockholm
Medal record
Representing Sweden
Olympic Games
Gold medal – first place	1912 Stockholm	Team road race

Johan Erik Friborg (24 January 1893 – 22 May 1968) was a Swedish road racing cyclist who competed in the 1912 Summer Olympics. He finished seventh individually and won a gold medal with the Swedish team. The city of Västerås donated a silver trophy to be given to the best Swedish road cyclist at the 1912 Olympics, and the trophy went to Friborg. In 1955, he donated it to a Swedish racing society (Sällskapet Gamla Tävlingcyklister), which decided to present it to the best Swedish cyclist at each forthcoming Olympics, as originally intended.

After the 1912 Games, Friborg moved to the United States. In 1917, he enlisted in the Swedish army and participated in the final stages of World War I. After that, he settled in France and worked as a physiotherapist in Cannes. He attended the 1920 and 1948 Olympics as a masseur for Swedish wrestlers; at the 1924 Games in Paris, he was an interpreter and deputy head of the Swedish cycling team. At the onset of World War II, Friborg moved to London, where he died in 1968.
