= Rathausmann =

Monument and symbol of Vienna, Austria

Coordinates: 48.2108°N 16.3581°E

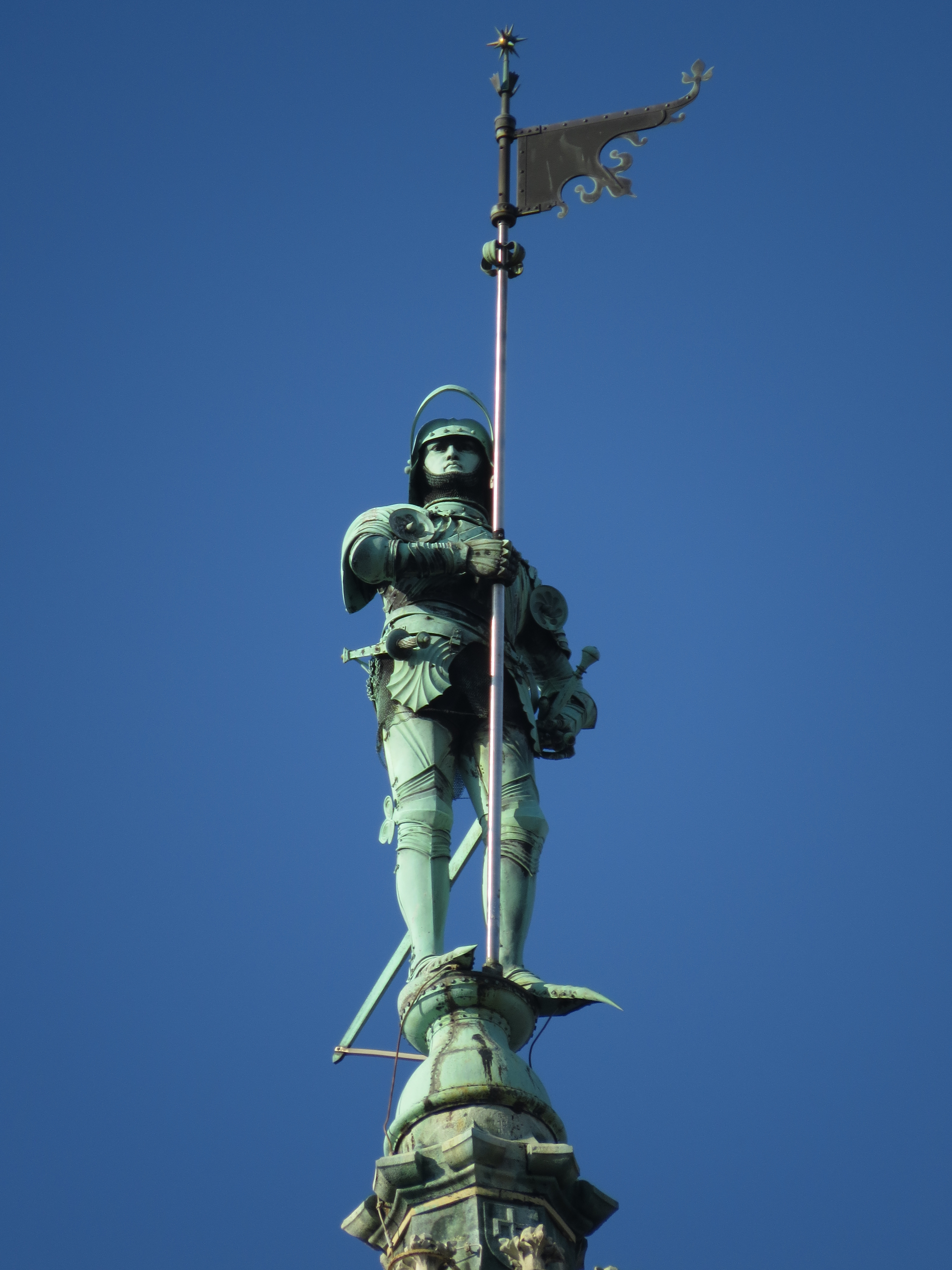
Rathausmann

Rathausmann (from German: 'city hall man') is a monument at the top of the City Hall in Vienna, Austria. Rathausmann is one of the symbols of Vienna. The statue itself is 5.4 m (18 ft) tall (including the flagpole), and its armour was modelled after that of Emperor Maximilian I.

A replica of the statue is in Rathauspark.
