= Oswald Rathmann =

German cyclist

Personal information
- Born: 21 July 1891 Glatz, German Empire (modern Poland
- Died: 22 September 1936 (aged 45)

Cycling career
- Sport: Cycling

Oswald Rathmann (21 July 1891 – 22 September 1936) was a German road racing cyclist who competed in the 1912 Summer Olympics. He was born in Glatz.

== Biography ==
In 1912, he was a member of the German cycling team, which finished sixth in the team time trial event. In the individual time trial competition he finished 33rd.
