= Algot Lönn =

Swedish cyclist

Personal information
- Full name: Karl Algot Lönn
- Born: 18 December 1887 Eskilstuna, Sweden
- Died: 3 April 1953 (aged 65) Eskilstuna, Sweden

Cycling career
- Sport: Cycling
Medal record
Men's road bicycle racing
Representing Sweden
Olympic Games
Gold medal – first place	1912 Stockholm	Team road race

Karl Algot Lönn (18 December 1887 – 3 April 1953) was a Swedish road racing cyclist who competed in the 1912 Summer Olympics. He was part of the team, which won the gold medal in the Team road race. In the individual road race he finished tenth.
