= Charles Moss (cyclist) =

English cyclist

Personal information
- Born: 6 March 1882 Ascott-under-Wychwood, Oxfordshire
- Died: 25 July 1963 (aged 81) Solihull, West Midlands

Cycling career
- Sport: Cycling
Medal record
Men's road bicycle racing
Representing Great Britain
Olympic Games
Silver medal – second place	1912 Stockholm	Team time trial

Charles Moss (6 March 1882 – 25 July 1963) was an English road racing cyclist who competed in the 1912 Summer Olympics. He was born in Ascott-under-Wychwood, Oxfordshire.

He was part of the Great Britain team which won the silver medal in the team time trial. In the individual time trial he finished 18th.
