= Albert Kruschel =

American cyclist (1889–1959)

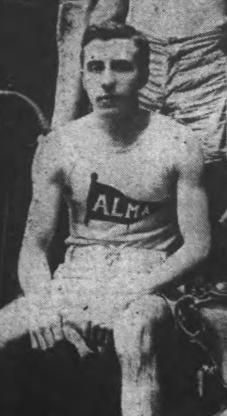
- Kruschel in 1913

Personal information
- Full name: Albert Michael Kruschel
- Born: October 21, 1889 Buffalo, New York, U.S.
- Died: March 25, 1959 (aged 69) Buffalo, New York, U.S.

Cycling career
- Sport: Cycling
Medal record
Men's road bicycle racing
Representing the United States
Olympic Games
Bronze medal – third place	1912 Stockholm	Team road race

Albert Michael Kruschel (October 21, 1889 – March 25, 1959) was an American road racing cyclist who competed in the 1912 Summer Olympics.

He was part of the team that won the bronze medal in the Team road race. In the individual road race he finished in 13th place.
