= Carl Schutte =

American cyclist

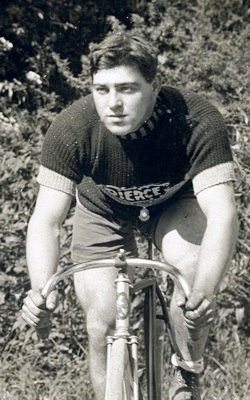
- Schutte circa 1910

Personal information
- Full name: Carl Otto Schutte
- Born: October 5, 1887 Kansas City, Missouri, U.S.
- Died: June 24, 1962 (aged 74) Seattle, Washington, U.S.

Cycling career
- Sport: Cycling
Medal record
Men's road bicycle racing
Representing the United States
Olympic Games
Bronze medal – third place	1912 Stockholm	Individual time trial
Bronze medal – third place	1912 Stockholm	Team time trial

Carl Otto Schutte (October 5, 1887 – June 24, 1962) was an American road racing cyclist who competed in the 1912 Summer Olympics. He won two bronze medals, one in the individual time trial and another in the team time trial.
