= Walden Martin =

American cyclist

Personal information
- Born: September 28, 1891
- Died: November 17, 1966 (aged 75)

Cycling career
- Sport: Cycling
- Discipline: Road racing
- Role: Rider

Professional team
- 1912: U.S. Olympic Cycling Team
Medal record
Representing the United States
Men's road bicycle racing
Olympic Games
Bronze medal – third place	1912 Stockholm	Team road race

Walden Martin (September 28, 1891 – November 17, 1966) was an American road racing cyclist who competed in the 1912 Summer Olympics. He was part of the team which won the bronze medal in the Team road race. In the individual road race, he finished 17th.
