= Johan Kankkonen =

Finnish cyclist

Personal information
- Full name: Johan Kankkonen
- Born: 11 July 1886 Kokkola, Finland
- Died: 3 February 1955 (aged 68) Ylivieska, Finland

Cycling career
- Sport: Cycling

Johan Werner Kankkonen (11 July 1886 – 3 February 1955) was a Finnish road racing cyclist who competed in the 1912 Summer Olympics. He was born in Kokkola and died in Ylivieska.

In 1912, he was a member of the Finnish cycling team, which finished fifth in the team time trial event. In the individual time trial competition he finished 34th.
