= Freddie Grubb =

English cyclist

Frederick Grubb
Personal information
- Full name: Frederick Henry Grubb
- Born: 27 May 1887 Kingston, Surrey, England
- Died: 6 March 1949 (aged 61) Surrey, England

Cycling career
- Sport: Cycling
- Discipline: Road
- Role: Rider
Medal record
Representing Great Britain
Men's road bicycle racing
Olympic Games
Silver medal – second place	1912 Stockholm	road race
Silver medal – second place	1912 Stockholm	Team road race

Frederick Henry Grubb (27 May 1887 – 6 March 1949) was a British road racing cyclist who competed in the 1912 Summer Olympics. He won silver medals in the individual road race and the team road race. In 1914, after he retired from racing, he established a bicycle manufacturing business (F.H.Grubb) in Brixton, London. By 1920, manufacturing had moved to Croydon and then in 1926 to Twickenham. In 1935, FHG Ltd was established in Wimbledon, but by 1947, the F H Grubb name was back in use. Two years after his death, the business was bought by Holdsworth, which used the Freddie Grubb brand until around 1978.

== Cycling career ==
Born in Kingston, Surrey, in 1887, Freddie Grubb was a leading rider when cycle racing in Britain was limited to time-trials and track racing. A writer said of him in 1910: "Since August Bank Holiday he has been the most talked-of cyclist in Great Britain... and it is safe to say that no man since Harry Green has shown more brilliant promise". Grubb was teetotal and a vegetarian. He rode for the Vegetarian Cycling and Athletic Club. He broke the 100-mile time-trial record in 1910 on a fixed-wheel bike with no brakes. The Vegetarian Club historian, Peter Duncan, said: "He has no brakes; traffic was so light he saw no need for them." (Note: Riding a fixed wheel, or direct gearing between the pedals and the back wheel, would have given him limited braking but not enough for an emergency stop.) Grubb rode the distance in less than five hours. The distance had already been ridden in less than five hours by "Goss" Green during a record attempt from London to Brighton and back over 104 miles; his finishing time showed he had ridden 100 miles in less than five hours, but he was denied the 100-mile record because he had not been timed at that distance. Grubb's ride was the first to be formally timed.

Grubb set a record for 12 hours in the Anerley event near Liverpool in 1911. The organizers had set a course of 210 miles, further than they expected any rider to go. It had to be extended to allow Grubb to ride 220.5 miles. The second rider, Charlie Davey, also beat the club's plans and finished in 215.5 miles.

Grubb set a record of 351 miles for a 24-hour time trial on the track. Henrik Morén broke it with 375.6 miles in 1912. Grubb's 5h 9m 41s for London to Brighton and back stood for 14 years. He rode a Triumph bicycle with a reinforced frame to withstand his style of forcing round big gears.

He won two silver medals in the Olympic Games in Stockholm in 1912. He turned professional in 1914. Cycling reported:

F. H. Grubb [has] returned his amateur licence to the National Cyclists' Union. He has decided to make cycle racing and record breaking both on road and path a profession... Next year, he will take part in all the big Continental road races, and will also participate in paced races on the track. Grubb, who has been a strict vegetarian for five years, is a non-smoker and total abstainer and should prove a very worthy British representative abroad. He is 25 years of age and scales 12th stripped, and when he gets accustomed to the Continental methods, there is no reason he should not shine as a star of the very first order in the professional ranks.

Grubb was considered for the New York, Paris and Berlin six-day races. He rode briefly on the continent, starting in the 1914 Giro d'Italia before returning disillusioned. The venture ended his cycling because rules denied professionals the right to ride again as an amateur.

== Cycle trade ==
Grubb opened a cycle business in Brixton, south London, in 1914, but the First World War started. Peter Duncan said:

Fred worked in a London munitions factory. He had long working hours and cycled to and from work every day. It was all bed and work. He wanted to get into the Navy for an easier life, but his reserved-occupation status was a problem. (Note: Dispensation from military enlistment was given to workers in 'Reserved-occupations', those industries, such as munitions, farming and mines, often considered too valuable at home to be allowed to fight abroad.) Eventually, he managed, but Navy catering meant when he returned, he was no longer vegetarian. He was made an honorary club member.

Grubb opened another shop after the war with money from his clubmate Charlie Davey. Grubb went into partnership with Ching Allin in 1919, forming Allin & Grubb of 132 Whitehorse Road, Croydon. The two split in a row over cycle design. Allin & Grubb became A. H. Allin and began selling Davey cycles rather than Grubb.

The cycle-trade historian Mick Butler, who called Grubb "not a very likeable character", said: (Note: Quick release wheels can be attached and detached faster than the nut and bolt of other wheels, an advantage when changing a punctured tyre during a race) (Note: Cycling historian Mick Butler also noted that the earliest reference for 'quick release wheels' that could be verified was Cycling, 4 March 1920 p XVI. An advert declared Grubb Racing Cycles – with the simplest quickest form of quick release wheels – Allin & Grubb, 132 Whitehorse Road, Croydon. The same issue of Cycling also contains an advert for 'F.H.Grubb, 250 London Road, Croydon', (just around the corner from Allin & Grubb), which goes on to state "no connection with any other firm" so it would seem they had already parted company or all was not quite well.)

After the Armistice (1918), Charlie Davey put up more money for Fred Grubb to resume production with Ching Allin in partnership and the firm of Allin & Grubb was founded in 1919. Ching was a much more likeable character, so with the prestigious name of Grubb on the bikes and the likeable nature and business acumen of Ching, the bikes were an instant hit, complete with the then revolutionary quick release.

Butler added:

An advert for F.H.Grubb [says] "NOT THE ONLY DROPOUT BUT THE ONLY GENUINE QUICK RELEASE". I was told many moons ago by Bill Bush and Len James, former stalwarts of the Southern Veteran Cycling Club, that there was one hell of a row between Ching Allin and Fred Grubb over who originally designed the drop-out and quick release on the Grubb bicycle. Apparently, Fred Grubb wanted all the credit as his name had top billing on the bikes they were making, and Ching was annoyed by this, staking a claim for Charley Davey, who was Fred's money man and the designer of the original QR.

Grubb opened another business under his own name on London Road, West Croydon, in 1920, and by 1924, he had a shop at Robsart Street, Brixton.

In 1934, Grubb advertised that his business was in liquidation. He then opened another company, FHG, at 147a Haydons Road, Wimbledon, with 20 staff from the former venture.

Grubb died on 6 March 1949, aged 61, in north-east Surrey, and his family continued the business. The Holdsworth company bought the Grubb name in 1952.
