= Friedrich-Schmidt-Platz =

Square in Vienna, Austria

Coordinates: 48.2114°N 16.3553°E

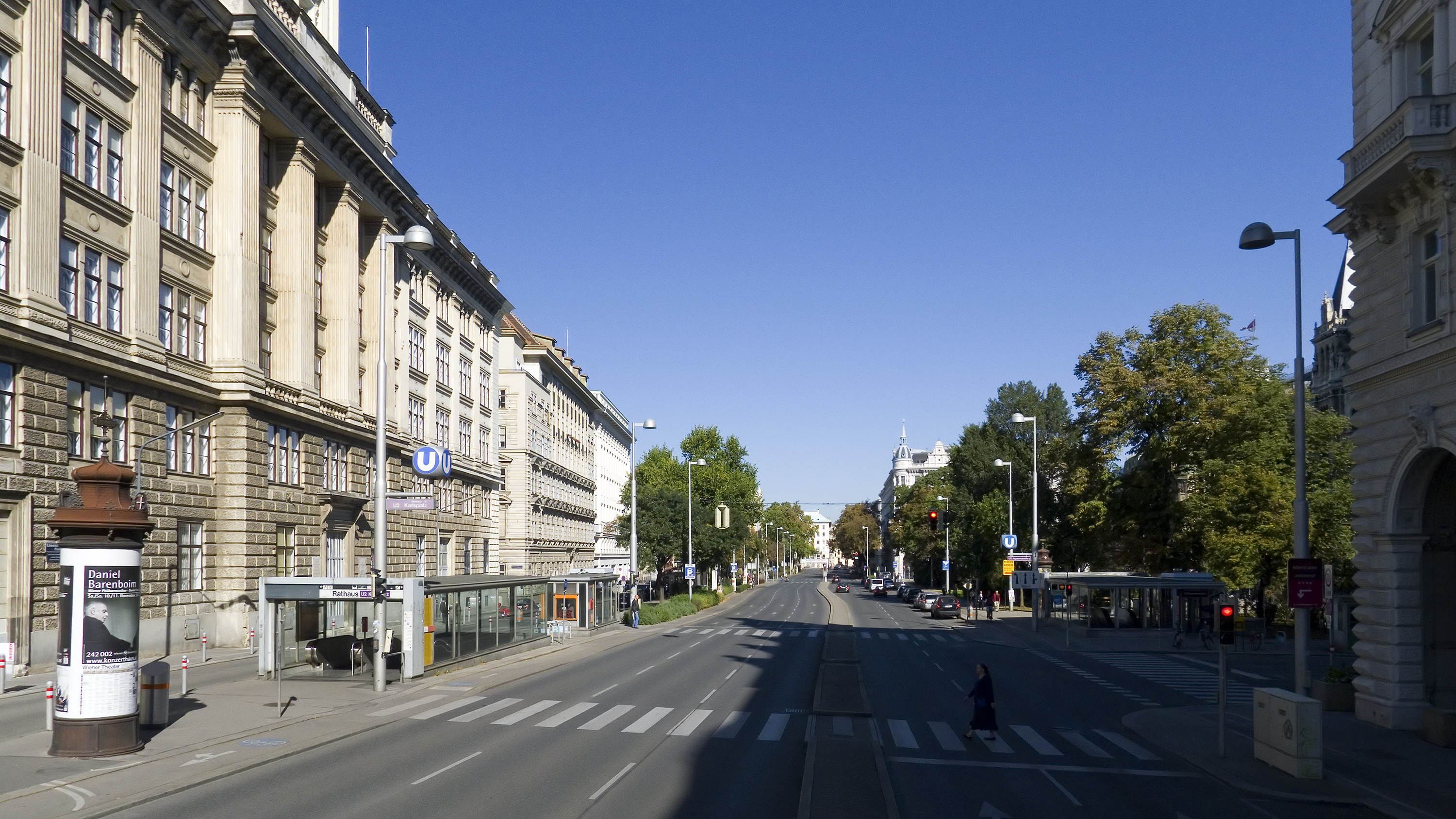
Friedrich-Schmidt-Platz

Friedrich-Schmidt-Platz is a square in Vienna, Austria.
