= Bohumil Kubrycht =

Czech cyclist

Personal information
- Born: 27 July 1886 Pardubice, Austria-Hungary

Cycling career
- Sport: Cycling

Bohumil Kubrycht (born 27 July 1886) was a Czech cyclist. He competed for Bohemia at the 1912 Summer Olympics.
