= Jan Vokoun =

Czech cyclist

Personal information
- Born: 2 August 1887 Prague, Austria-Hungary

Cycling career
- Sport: Cycling

Jan Vokoun (born 2 August 1887, date of death unknown) was a Czech cyclist. He competed for Bohemia in two events at the 1912 Summer Olympics.
