= Arturo Friedemann =

Chilean cyclist

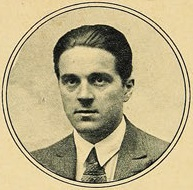

Personal information
- Born: 1 January 1893 Santiago, Chile
- Died: 6 March 1973 (aged 80)

Cycling career
- Sport: Cycling

Arturo Friedemann (1 January 1893 – 6 March 1973) was a Chilean cyclist. He competed in two events at the 1912 Summer Olympics.
