= Cárlos Koller =

Chilean cyclist

Personal information
- Born: 25 November 1888 Malleco, Chile
- Died: 11 July 1972 (aged 83)

Cycling career
- Sport: Cycling

Cárlos Koller (25 November 1888 – 11 July 1972) was a Chilean cyclist. He competed in two events at the 1912 Summer Olympics.
