= Cycling at the 1924 Summer Olympics – Men's individual time trial =

Men's individual time trial at the Games of the VIII Olympiad
- Venue: Stade Olympique Yves-du-Manoir and roads
- Date: July 23
- Competitors: 71 from 22 nations

Medalists
1st place, gold medalist(s)		Armand Blanchonnet	France
2nd place, silver medalist(s)		Henri Hoevenaers	Belgium
3rd place, bronze medalist(s)		René Hamel	France

The men's individual time trial event was part of the road cycling programme at the 1924 Summer Olympics. The results of individual cyclists were summed to give team results in the team time trial event.

The field consisted of 71 cyclists from 22 countries. The course was a 188-kilometre (117 mi) loop beginning and ending at the Stade Olympique Yves-du-Manoir.

== Results ==
Place	Cyclist	Time
1st place, gold medalist(s)	Armand Blanchonnet (FRA)	6:20:48.0
2nd place, silver medalist(s)	Henri Hoevenaers (BEL)	6:30:27.0
3rd place, bronze medalist(s)	René Hamel (FRA)	6:30:51.6
4	Gunnar Sköld (SWE)	6:33:36.2
5	Albert Blattmann (SUI)	6:34:09.0
6	Auguste Parfondry (BEL)	6:35:57.0
7	Erik Bohlin (SWE)	6:36:12.4
8	Georges Wambst (FRA)	6:38:34.4
9	André Leducq (FRA)	6:39:16.0
10	Jean Van Den Bosch (BEL)	6:40:31.4
11	Henry Kaltenbrunn (RSA)	6:41:34.4
12	Ardito Bresciani (ITA)	6:41:39.4
13	Cor Heeren (NED)	6:41:50.8
14	Otto Lehner (SUI)	6:43:39.0
15	Antonio Negrini (ITA)	6:48:09.8
16	Fernand Saivé (BEL)	6:48:46.4
17	Ragnar Malm (SWE)	6:49:53.0
18	Nello Ciaccheri (ITA)	6:50:10.0
19	Johannes Maas (NED)	6:51:05.0
20	Luigi Magnotti (ITA)	6:53:25.0
21	Georges Antenen (SUI)	6:53:27.0
22	Andy Wilson (GBR)	6:53:52.4
23	Ernie Pilcher (GBR)	6:54:02.0
24	Dave Marsh (GBR)	6:56:52.4
25	Georges Schiltz (LUX)	7:00:34.4
26	Philippus Innemee (NED)	7:04:32.0
27	Nic Rausch (LUX)	7:04:46.0
28	Fritz Bossi (SUI)	7:05:43.4
29	Martinus Vlietman (NED)	7:07:32.4
30	Cosme Saavedra (ARG)	7:09:16.2
31	Luis de Meyer (ARG)	7:14:10.4
32	Antonín Perič (TCH)	7:14:47.8
33	John Boulicault (USA)	7:15:51.6
34	Samuel Hunter (GBR)	7:16:35.0
35	Ðuro Dukanović (YUG)	7:17:23.6
36	Sidney Ramsden (AUS)	7:18:23.4
37	Ivan Kosmatin (YUG)	7:18:24.0
38	Georg Claussen (DEN)	7:19:16.4
39	Louis Pesch (LUX)	7:19:51.4
40	Karel Červenka (TCH)	7:20:20.0
41	Koloman Sović (YUG)	7:21:35.0
42	Jean-Pierre Kuhn (LUX)	7:22:12.4
43	José Zampicchiatti (ARG)	7:24:17.0
44	Antonín Charvát (TCH)	7:26:09.0
45	Ignatius Gronkowski (USA)	7:34:41.8
46	Mohamed Madkour (EGY)	7:35:38.4
47	Ilmari Voudelin (FIN)	7:41:03.4
48	Oswald Miller (POL)	7:46:56.0
49	Gustav Hentschel (USA)	7:52:59.6
50	Milan Truban (YUG)	7:53:40.0
51	Mihály Rusovszky (HUN)	7:57:49.0
52	Erik Frank (FIN)	8:04:53.0
53	Georgi Abadzhiev (BUL)	8:08:35.0
54	Joe Laporte (CAN)	8:11:22.0
55	Feliks Kostrzębski (POL)	8:14:53.6
56	Toivo Hörkkö (FIN)	8:18:00.0
57	Mikhail Klaynerov (BUL)	8:23:18.0
58	Victor Hopkins (USA)	8:29:02.0
59	Kazimierz Krzemiński (POL)	8:40:18.6
60	Ferenc Steiner (HUN)	8:42:14.4
–	Erik Andersen (DEN)	Did not finish
–	Isakas Anolikas (LTU)	Did not finish
–	Atanas Atanasov (BUL)	Did not finish
–	Erik Bjurberg (SWE)	Did not finish
–	Anton Collin (FIN)	Did not finish
–	Mikhail Georgiev (BUL)	Did not finish
–	Ahmed Salem Hassan (EGY)	Did not finish
–	Wiktor Hoechsmann (POL)	Did not finish
–	František Kundert (TCH)	Did not finish
–	Julio Polet (ARG)	Did not finish
–	Juozas Vilpišauskas (LTU)	Did not finish
