= Cycling at the 1924 Summer Olympics – Men's team time trial =

Men's team time trial at the Games of the VIII Olympiad
- Venue: Stade Olympique Yves-du-Manoir and roads
- Date: July 23
- Competitors: 60 from 15 nations

Medalists
1st place, gold medalist(s)		Armand Blanchonnet, René Hamel, André Leducq, Georges Wambst; France
2nd place, silver medalist(s)		Henri "Rik" Hoevenaers, Auguste Parfondry, Jean Van Den Bosch, Fernand Saivé; Belgium
3rd place, bronze medalist(s)		Gunnar Sköld, Erik Bohlin, Ragnar Malm, Erik Bjurberg; Sweden

The men's individual time trial event was part of the road cycling programme at the 1924 Summer Olympics. The results of individual cyclists were summed to give team results, with the worst time for each team being ignored. It was the third appearance of the team time trial; France successfully defended its 1920 championship in the event while Sweden won its third medal.

Fifteen countries fielded four-man teams, out of the total field of 71 cyclists from 22 countries. The course was a 188-kilometre (117 mi) loop beginning and ending at the Stade Olympique Yves-du-Manoir.

== Results ==
Place	Cyclists	Team	Time
1st place, gold medalist(s)	Armand Blanchonnet; René Hamel; André Leducq; Georges Wambst	France	19:30:14.0
2nd place, silver medalist(s)	Henri "Rik" Hoevenaers; Auguste Parfondry; Jean Van Den Bosch; Fernand Saivé	Belgium	19:46:55.4
3rd place, bronze medalist(s)	Gunnar Sköld; Erik Bohlin; Ragnar Malm; Erik Bjurberg	Sweden	19:59:41.6
4	Albert Blattmann; Otto Lehner; Georges Antenen; Fritz Bossi	Switzerland	20:11:15.0
5	Ardito Bresciani; Antonio Negrini; Nello Ciaccheri; Luigi Magnotti	Italy	20:19:59.2
6	Cor Heeren; Jan Maas; Philippus Innemee; Martinus Vlietman	Netherlands	20:37:27.8
7	Andy Wilson; Ernie Pilcher; Dave Marsh; Samuel Hunter	Great Britain	20:44:46.8
8	Georges Schiltz; Nic Rausch; Louis Pesch; Jean-Pierre Kuhn	Luxembourg	21:25:11.8
9	Cosme Saavedra; Luis de Meyer; José Zampìchiatti; Julio Polet	Argentina	21:47:43.6
10	Ðuro Dukanović; Ivan Kosmatin; Koloman Sović; Milan Truban	Yugoslavia	21:57:22.6
11	Antonín Perič; Karel Červenka; Antonín Charvát; František Kundert	Czechoslovakia	22:01:16.8
12	John Boulicault; Ignatius Gronkowski; Gustav Hentschel; Victor Hopkins	United States	22:43:33.0
13	Ilmari Voudelin; Toivo Hörkkö; Erik Frank; Anton Collin	Finland	24:03:56.4
14	Oswald Miller; Feliks Kostrzębski; Kazimierz Krzemiński; Wiktor Hoechsmann	Poland	24:42:08.2
15	Georgi Abadzhiev; Mikhail Klaynerov; Atanas Atanasov; Mikhail Georgiev	Bulgaria	Did not finish
