= Poland at the 1924 Summer Olympics =

- IOC code: POL
- NOC: Polish Olympic Committee

in Paris, France
- Competitors: 65 (64 men, 1 woman) in 10 sports
- Flag bearer: Sławosz Szydłowski
- Medals Ranked 22nd: Gold 0 Silver 1 Bronze 1 Total 2

Summer Olympics appearances (overview)
- 1924; 1928; 1932; 1936; 1948; 1952; 1956; 1960; 1964; 1968; 1972; 1976; 1980; 1984; 1988; 1992; 1996; 2000; 2004; 2008; 2012; 2016; 2020; 2024; 2028

Other related appearances
- Russian Empire (1900, 1912); Austria (1908–1912)

Poland competed at the Summer Olympic Games for the first time at the 1924 Summer Olympics in Paris, France. 65 competitors, 64 men and 1 woman, took part in 38 events in 10 sports.

== Medalists ==
Medal	Name	Sport	Event
Silver	Józef Lange; Jan Łazarski; Tomasz Stankiewicz; Franciszek Szymczyk	Cycling	Men's team pursuit
Bronze	Adam Królikiewicz	Equestrian	Individual jumping

== Athletics ==
Fourteen athletes represented Poland in 1924. It was the nation's debut appearance in the sport as well as the Games.

Ranks given are within the heat.

Athlete	Event	Heats		Quarterfinals		Semifinals		Final	
Athlete	Event	Result	Rank	Result	Rank	Result	Rank	Result	Rank
Stefan Adamczak	Pole vault	—N/a				3.20	9	Did not advance	
Antoni Cejzik	Decathlon	—N/a						6319.455	12
Władysław Dobrowolski	100 m	11.5	5	Did not advance					
Józef Jaworski	1500 m	—N/a				4:28.4	8	Did not advance	
Stefan Kostrzewski	800 m	—N/a		2:01.6	4	Did not advance			
Stefan Kostrzewski	1500 m	—N/a				4:29.0	7	Did not advance	
Stefan Ołdak	400 m	55.0	3	Did not advance					
Stefan Ołdak	800 m	—N/a		2:09.6	6	Did not advance			
Stanisław Sośnicki	100 m	11.6	4	Did not advance					
Stanisław Sośnicki	Long jump	—N/a				5.67	12	Did not advance	
Stanisław Świętochowski	400 m	55.4	4	Did not advance					
Stefan Szelestowski	5000 m	—N/a				Unknown	9	Did not advance	
Aleksander Szenajch	100 m	Unknown	4	Did not advance					
Aleksander Szenajch	200 m	22.8	4	Did not advance					
Sławosz Szydłowski	Discus throw	—N/a				35.71	7	Did not advance	
Sławosz Szydłowski	Javelin throw	—N/a				46.00	14	Did not advance	
Zygmunt Weiss	100 m	11.4	5	Did not advance					
Zygmunt Weiss	200 m	23.4	3	Did not advance					
Stanisław Ziffer	5000 m	—N/a				16:36.0	14	Did not advance	
Stanisław Ziffer	3000 m steeplechase	—N/a				10:38.4	5	Did not advance	
Julian Łukaszewicz; Stefan Szelestowski; Stanisław Ziffer	3000 m team	—N/a				41	5	Did not advance	

== Boxing ==
Five boxers represented Poland at the 1924 Games. It was the nation's debut in the sport as well as the Games. None of the Polish boxers advanced past the first bout.

Boxer	Weight class	Round of 32	Round of 16	Quarterfinals	Semifinals	Final / Bronze match	
Boxer	Weight class	Opposition Score	Opposition Score	Opposition Score	Opposition Score	Opposition Score	Rank
Jan Ertmański	Welterweight	BYE	Haggerty (USA); L	Did not advance			9
Jan Gerbich	Light heavyweight	BYE	Petersen (DEN); L	Did not advance			9
Tomasz Konarzewski	Heavyweight	BYE	Larsen (DEN); L	Did not advance			9
Eugeniusz Nowak	Middleweight	BYE	Murphy (IRL); L	Did not advance			9
Adam Świtek	Welterweight	Haggerty (USA); L	Did not advance				17

Opponent nation	Wins	Losses	Percent
Denmark	0	2	.000
Ireland	0	1	.000
United States	0	2	.000
Total	0	5	.000

Round	Wins	Losses	Percent
Round of 32	0	1	.000
Round of 16	0	4	.000
Quarterfinals	0	0	–
Semifinals	0	0	–
Final	0	0	–
Bronze match	0	0	–
Total	0	5	.000

== Cycling ==
Eight cyclists represented Poland in 1924. It was the nation's debut in the sport as well as the Games. The pursuit team won the silver medal. Lange, a member of the team, also placed fifth in the 50 kilometres.

=== Road cycling ===
Cyclist	Event	Final	
Cyclist	Event	Result	Rank
Wiktor Hoechsmann	Time trial	Did not finish	
Feliks Kostrzębski	Time trial	8:14:43.6	55
Kazimierz Krzemiński	Time trial	8:40:18.6	59
Oswald Miller	Time trial	7:46:56.0	48
Wiktor Hoechsmann; Feliks Kostrzębski; Kazimierz Krzemiński; Oswald Miller	Team time trial	24:42:08.2	14

=== Track cycling ===
Ranks given are within the heat.

Cyclist	Event	First round		First repechage		Quarterfinals		Second repechage		Semifinals		Final	
Cyclist	Event	Result	Rank	Result	Rank	Result	Rank	Result	Rank	Result	Rank	Result	Rank
Józef Lange	50 km	—N/a										Unknown	5
Jan Łazarski	50 km	—N/a										Unknown	8–36
Jan Łazarski	Sprint	Unknown	2 R	Unknown	2	Did not advance							
Franciszek Szymczyk	Sprint	13.6	1 Q	Advanced directly		Unknown	3 R	Did not start		Did not advance			
Józef Lange; Jan Lazarski; Tomasz Stankiewicz; Franciszek Szymczyk	Team pursuit	5:16.0	1 Q	—N/a		5:16.8	2 q	—N/a		5:18.0	1 Q	5:23.0	Silver medal

== Equestrian ==
Six equestrians represented Poland in 1924. It was the nation's debut in the sport as well as the Games. Królikiewicz won the country's first equestrian medal with the bronze in the jumping competition.

Equestrian	Event	Final		
Equestrian	Event	Score	Time	Rank
Kazimierz de Rostwo-Suski	Eventing	958.5	N/A	24
Zdzisław Dziadulski	Jumping	30.50	2:49.4	28
Tadeusz Komorowski	Eventing	929.0	N/A	26
Adam Królikiewicz	Jumping	10.00	2:38.4	Bronze medal
Kazimierz Szosland	Eventing	964.5	N/A	23
Kazimierz Szosland	Jumping	39.25	3:20.0	32
Karol von Rómmel	Eventing	1648.5	N/A	10
Karol von Rómmel	Jumping	18.00	2:38.2	10
Kazimierz de Rostwo-Suski; Tadeusz Komorowski; Kazimierz Szosland; Karol von Rómmel	Team eventing	3751.5	N/A	7
Zdzisław Dziadulski; Adam Królikiewicz; Kazimierz Szosland; Karol von Rómmel	Team jumping	58.50	N/A	6

== Fencing ==
Five fencers, four men and one woman, represented Poland in 1924. It was the nation's debut in the sport; Poland was one of nine nations to send women to the first Olympic women's fencing competition.

Men

Ranks given are within the pool.

Fencer	Event	Round 1		Round 2		Quarterfinals		Semifinals		Final	
Fencer	Event	Result	Rank	Result	Rank	Result	Rank	Result	Rank	Result	Rank
Konrad Winkler	Foil	Mendy (URU); L 4-5; Ettinger (AUT); L 3-5; Albaret (SUI); L 3-5; Munck (DEN); L 3-5	5	Did not advance							
Alfred Ader; Adam Papée; Konrad Winkler; Jerzy Zabielski	Team sabre	Netherlands; L 0-16; United States; L 4-12	4	—N/a		Did not advance					

Women

Ranks given are within the pool.

Fencer	Event	Quarterfinals		Semifinals		Final	
Fencer	Event	Result	Rank	Result	Rank	Result	Rank
Wanda Dubieńska	Foil	Daniell (GBR); L 0-5; Hamilton (SWE); L 1-5; Barding (DEN); L 0-5; Bory (FRA); L 1-5 de Boer (NED); L 0-5	6	Did not advance			

== Football ==
Poland competed in the Olympic football tournament for the first time in 1924.

Round 1

May 26, 1924

Hungary	5–0	Poland
Eisenhoffer 14'; Hirzer 51' 58'; Opata 70' 87'	Report

Stade Bergeyre
Attendance: 3,000
Referee: Johannes Mutters (NED)

Final rank
17th place

== Rowing ==
Six rowers represented Poland in 1924. It was the nation's debut in the sport.

Ranks given are within the heat.

Rower	Event	Round one		Repechage		Final	
Rower	Event	Result	Rank	Result	Rank	Result	Rank
Andrzej Osiecimski-Czapski	Single sculls	Unknown	3	Did not advance			
Antoni Brzozowski; Henryk Fronczak; Edmund Kowalec; Józef Szawara; Władysław Nadratowski	Coxed four	Unknown	3	Did not advance			

== Sailing ==
A single sailor represented Poland in 1924. It was the nation's debut in the sport as well as the Games.

Sailor	Event	Qualifying				Final			
Sailor	Event	Race 1	Race 2	Race 3	Total	Race 1	Race 2	Total	Rank
Edward Bryzemejster	Olympic monotype	6	6	N/A		Did not advance			

== Shooting ==
Seven sport shooters represented Poland in 1924.

Shooter	Event	Final	
Shooter	Event	Score	Rank
Marian Borzemski	25 m rapid fire pistol	17	9
Marian Borzemski	600 m free rifle	66	60
Bolesław Gościewicz	25 m rapid fire pistol	13	47
Stanisław Kowalczewski	25 m rapid fire pistol	16	21
Stanisław Kowalczewski	600 m free rifle	69	58
Walerian Maryański	25 m rapid fire pistol	16	21
Władysław Świątek	600 m free rifle	62	65
Eugeniusz Waszkiewicz	600 m free rifle	64	63
Marian Borzemski; Franciszek Brożek; Bolesław Gościewicz; Stanisław Kowalczewski; Władysław Świątek	Team free rifle	477	15

== Wrestling ==
=== Greco-Roman ===
Men's

Athlete	Event	First round	Second round	Third round	Fourth round	Fifth round	Sixth round	Seventh round	Eighth round	Rank
Athlete	Event	Opposition Result	Opposition Result	Opposition Result	Opposition Result	Opposition Result	Opposition Result	Opposition Result	Opposition Result	Rank
Wacław Okulicz-Kozaryn	Middleweight	Veuve (SUI); W	Lindfors (FIN); L	Vidal (ESP); W	Yalaz (TUR); W	Grbić (YUG); L	Did not advance		—N/a	7
Leon Rękawek	Lightweight	Pavlidis (GRE); W	Praks (EST); L	Askehave (DEN); L	Did not advance			—N/a		=13
