= UCI Road World Championships – Men's amateur road race =

- Rainbow jersey

Race details
- Discipline: road race
- Type: One-day
- Organiser: UCI

History
- First edition: 1921
- Editions: 62
- First winner: Gunnar Sköld (SWE)
- Most wins: Giuseppe Martano (ITA); Gustav-Adolf Schur (GDR) 2 times
- Most recent: Danny Nelissen (NED)

The UCI Road World Championships – Men's amateur road race was the annual world championship for amateurs for road bicycle racing in the discipline of a road race, organised by the world governing body, the Union Cycliste Internationale. The event was first run in 1921.

== Medal winners ==
| Championships | Gold | Silver | Bronze |
|---|---|---|---|
| 1921 | (Sweden) Gunnar Sköld | (Denmark) Willum Nielsen | (United Kingdom) Charles Davey |
| 1922 | (United Kingdom) David Marsh | (United Kingdom) Bill Burkill | (United Kingdom) Charles Davey |
| 1923 | (Italy) Liberio Ferrario | (Switzerland) Othmar Eichenberger | (Switzerland) Georges Antenen |
| 1924 | (France) André Leducq | (Switzerland) Otto Lehner | (France) Armand Blanchonnet |
| 1925 | (Belgium) Henri Hoevenaers | (France) Marc Bocher | (Netherlands) Gert van den Berg |
| 1926 | (France) Octave Dayen | (France) Jules Merviel | (Italy) Pierre Polano |
| 1927 | (Belgium) Jean Aerts | (Germany) Rudolf Wolke | (Italy) Michele Orecchia |
| 1928 | (Italy) Allegro Grandi | (Italy) Michele Bara | (Belgium) Jean Aerts |
| 1929 | (Italy) Pierino Bertolazzo | (Italy) Remo Bertoni | (France) René Brossy |
| 1930 | (Italy) Giuseppe Martano | (Italy) Eugenio Gestri | (Germany) Rudolf Risch |
| 1931 | (Denmark) Henry Hansen | (Italy) Giuseppe Olmo | (Denmark) Leo Nielsen |
| 1932 | (Italy) Giuseppe Martano | (Switzerland) Paul Egli | (France) Paul Chocque |
| 1933 | (Switzerland) Paul Egli | (Switzerland) Kurt Stettler | (Belgium) Joseph Lowagie |
| 1934 | (Netherlands) Kees Pellenaers | (France) André Deforge | (Belgium) Paul André |
| 1935 | (Italy) Ivo Mancini | (France) Robert Charpentier | (Denmark) Werner Grundahl |
| 1936 | (Switzerland) Edgar Buchwalder | (Switzerland) Gottlieb Weber | (Italy) Pierino Favalli |
| 1937 | (Italy) Adolfo Leoni | (Denmark) Frode Sørensen | Fritz Scheller |
| 1938 | (Switzerland) Hans Knecht | (Switzerland) Josef Wagner | (Netherlands) Joop Demmenie |
No race due to World War II
| 1946 | (France) Henry Aubry | (Switzerland) Ernest Stettler | (Belgium) Henri Van Kerkhove |
| 1947 | (Italy) Alfio Ferrari | (Italy) Silvio Pedroni | (Netherlands) Gerard Van Beek |
| 1948 | (Sweden) Harry Snell | (Belgium) Liévin Lerno | (Sweden) Olle Wänlund |
| 1949 | (Netherlands) Henk Faanhof | (Luxembourg) Henri Kaas | (Netherlands) Hubert Vinken |
| 1950 | (Australia) Jack Hoobin | (France) Robert Varnajo | (Italy) Alfio Ferrari |
| 1951 | (Italy) Gianni Ghidini | (Italy) Rino Benedetti | (Netherlands) Jan Plantaz |
| 1952 | (Italy) Luciano Ciancola | (Belgium) André Noyelle | (Luxembourg) Roger Ludwig |
| 1953 | (Italy) Ricardo Filippi | (Italy) Gastone Nencini | (Belgium) Rik Van Looy |
| 1954 | (Belgium) Emiel Van Cauter | (Denmark) Hans Andresen | (Netherlands) Martin Van den Borgh |
| 1955 | (Italy) Sante Ranucci | (Italy) Lino Grassi | (Italy) Dino Bruni |
| 1956 | (Netherlands) Frans Mahn | (Belgium) Norbert Verougstraete | (Netherlands) Jan Buis |
| 1957 | (Belgium) Louis Proost | (Italy) Arnaldo Pambianco | (Netherlands) Schalk Verhoef |
| 1958 | (East Germany) Gustav-Adolf Schur | (Belgium) Valère Paulissen | (Belgium) Henri De Wolf |
| 1959 | (East Germany) Gustav-Adolf Schur | (Netherlands) Bastiaan Maliepaard | (Belgium) Constant Goosens |
| 1960 | (East Germany) Bernhard Eckstein | (East Germany) Gustav-Adolf Schur | (Belgium) Willy Vanden Berghen |
| 1961 | (France) Jean Jourden | (France) Henri Belena | (France) Jacques Gestraut |
| 1962 | (Italy) Renato Bongioni | (Denmark) Ole Ritter | (Netherlands) Arie den Hartog |
| 1963 | (Italy) Flaviano Vicentini | (France) Francis Bazire | (West Germany) Winfried Bölke |
| 1964 | (Belgium) Eddy Merckx | (Belgium) Willy Planckaert | (Sweden) Gösta Pettersson |
| 1965 | (France) Jacques Botherel | José Manuel Lasa | (Italy) Battista Monti |
| 1966 | (Netherlands) Evert Dolman | (United Kingdom) Les West | (Denmark) Willy Skibby |
| 1967 | (United Kingdom) Graham Webb | (France) Claude Guyot | (Netherlands) René Pijnen |
| 1968 | (Italy) Vittorio Marcelli | (Brazil) Luis-Carlos Florès | (Sweden) Erik Pettersson |
| 1969 | (Denmark) Leif Mortensen | (Belgium) Jean-Pierre Monseré | (Belgium) Gustave Van Roosbroeck |
| 1970 | (Denmark) Jørgen Schmidt | (Belgium) Ludo Van der Linden | (Belgium) Tony Gakens |
| 1971 | (France) Régis Ovion | (Belgium) Freddy Maertens | José Luis Viejo |
| 1972 | No race due to the Summer Olympics | | |
| 1973 | (Poland) Ryszard Szurkowski | (Poland) Stanisław Szozda | (France) Bernard Bourreau |
| 1974 | (Poland) Janusz Kowalski | (Poland) Ryszard Szurkowski | (Switzerland) Michel Kuhn |
| 1975 | (Netherlands) André Gevers | (Sweden) Sven-Åke Nilsson | (Italy) Roberto Ceruti |
| 1976 | No race due to the Summer Olympics | | |
| 1977 | (Italy) Claudio Corti | (Soviet Union) Sergueï Morozov | (Italy) Salvatore Maccali |
| 1978 | (Switzerland) Gilbert Glaus | (Poland) Krzysztof Sujka | (Switzerland) Stefan Mutter |
| 1979 | (Italy) Gianni Giacomini | (Poland) Jan Jankiewicz | (East Germany) Bernd Drogan |
| 1980 | No race due to the Summer Olympics | | |
| 1981 | (Soviet Union) Andrei Vedernikov | (Belgium) Rudy Rogiers | (Switzerland) Gilbert Glaus |
| 1982 | (East Germany) Bernd Drogan | (Belgium) Francis Vermaelen | (Switzerland) Jorg Bruggmann |
| 1983 | (East Germany) Uwe Raab | (Switzerland) Niki Rüttimann | (Poland) Andrzej Serediuk |
| 1984 | No race due to the Summer Olympics | | |
| 1985 | (Poland) Lech Piasecki | (Denmark) Johnny Weltz | (Belgium) Frank Van De Vijver |
| 1986 | (East Germany) Uwe Ampler | (Netherlands) John Talen | (Netherlands) Arjan Jagt |
| 1987 | (France) Richard Vivien | (West Germany) Hartmut Bölts | (Denmark) Alex Pedersen |
| 1988 | No race due to the Summer Olympics | | |
| 1989 | (Poland) Joachim Halupczok | (France) Éric Pichon | (France) Christophe Manin |
| 1990 | (Italy) Mirco Gualdi | (Italy) Roberto Caruso | (France) Jean-Philippe Dojwa |
| 1991 | (Soviet Union) Viktor Rjaksinski | (Italy) Davide Rebellin | (Switzerland) Beat Zberg |
| 1992 | No race due to the Summer Olympics | | |
| 1993 | (Germany) Jan Ullrich | (Latvia) Kaspars Ozers | (Czech Republic) Lubor Tesař |
| 1994 | (Denmark) Alex Pedersen | (Slovakia) Milan Dvorščík | (France) Christophe Mengin |
| 1995 | (Netherlands) Danny Nelissen | (Italy) Daniele Sgnaolin | (Colombia) Víctor Becerra |

=== Medallists by nation ===
| Rank | Nation | Gold | Silver | Bronze | Total |
|---|---|---|---|---|---|
| 1 | Italy (ITA) | 18 | 12 | 8 | 38 |
| 2 | France (FRA) | 7 | 9 | 8 | 24 |
| 3 | Netherlands (NLD) | 6 | 2 | 11 | 19 |
| 4 | East Germany (RDA) | 6 | 1 | 1 | 8 |
| 5 | Belgium (BEL) | 5 | 10 | 11 | 26 |
| 6 | Switzerland (SUI) | 4 | 8 | 6 | 18 |
| 7 | Denmark (DEN) | 4 | 5 | 4 | 13 |
| 8 | Poland (POL) | 4 | 4 | 1 | 9 |
| 9 | Great Britain (GBR) | 2 | 2 | 2 | 6 |
| 10 | Sweden (SWE) | 2 | 1 | 3 | 6 |
| 11 | Soviet Union (URS) | 2 | 1 | 0 | 3 |
| 12 | Germany (GER) | 1 | 2 | 3 | 6 |
| 13 | Australia (AUS) | 1 | 0 | 0 | 1 |
| 14 | Luxembourg (LUX) | 0 | 1 | 1 | 2 |
| 14 | Spain (ESP) | 0 | 1 | 1 | 2 |
| 16 | Brazil (BRA) | 0 | 1 | 0 | 1 |
| 16 | Latvia (LAT) | 0 | 1 | 0 | 1 |
| 16 | Slovakia (SVK) | 0 | 1 | 0 | 1 |
| 19 | Colombia (COL) | 0 | 0 | 1 | 1 |
| 19 | Czech Republic (CZE) | 0 | 0 | 1 | 1 |
| Totals (20 entries) | | 62 | 62 | 62 | 186 |
