= 1924 UCI Road World Championships =

Cycling competition

- Venue: Versailles, France
- Date: 2 August 1924
- Coordinates: 48°48′19″N 2°08′06″E
- Events: 1

The 1924 UCI Road World Championships was the fourth edition of the UCI Road World Championships. The championship took place in Versailles, France on Saturday 2 August 1924 and consisted of 1 race for amateur cyclists.

In the same period, the 1924 UCI Track Cycling World Championships was organized in the Parc des Princes in Paris.

== Events summary ==
Event	Gold		Silver		Bronze	
Men's events
Men's amateur road race	André Leducq; France	5h 30 min. 34 sec.	Otto Lehner; Switzerland	+ 1 min. 02 sec.	Armand Blanchonnet; France	+ 3 min. 53 sec.

France won the nations classification (total time of the first four riders per nation) ahead of Italy and Switzerland.

== Medal table ==
Rank	Nation	Gold	Silver	Bronze	Total
1	France (FRA)	1	0	1	2
2	Switzerland (SUI)	0	1	0	1
Totals (2 entries)		1	1	1	3

== Results ==
The course was 180 km.

Place	Rider	Country	Time
1	André Leducq	France	5h 30m 34s
2	Otto Lehner	Switzerland	+ 01m 02s
3	Armand Blanchonnet	France	+ 03m 53s
4	Libero Ferrario	Italy	+ 08m 20s
5	Georges Wambst	France	+ 09m 38s
6	Georges Antenen	Switzerland	+ 12m 16s
7	Arturo Bresciani	Italy	+ 15m 10s
8	Alfons De Cat	Belgium	+ 18m 33s
9	Jean Van Den Bosch	Belgium	+ 21m 54s
10	Ernie Pilcher	Great Britain	+ 27m 48s
11	Domenico Piemontesi	Italy	+ 29m 54s
12	Erik Bohlin	Sweden	+30m 07s
13	Andy Wilson	Great Britain	+31m 20s
14	Joris Van Dijk	Netherlands	+31m 53s
15	Luigi Magnotti	Italy	+37m 01s
16	Gustav Lauppi	Switzerland	+38m 17s
17	Johan Christian Johansen	Denmark	+41m 33s
18	Henry-Peter Hansen	Denmark	+45m 46s
19	Bochsman	Poland	+46m 08s
20	Jan Maas	Netherlands	+46m 34s
21	Wout Heeren	Netherlands	+47m 18s
22	Frimodig	Sweden	+49m 10s

== See also ==
- 1924 UCI Track Cycling World Championships
