= Bulgaria at the 1924 Summer Olympics =

- IOC code: BUL
- NOC: Bulgarian Olympic Committee

in Paris
- Competitors: 24 in 4 sports
- Flag bearer: Kiril Petrunov
- Medals: Gold 0 Silver 0 Bronze 0 Total 0

Summer Olympics appearances (overview)
- 1896; 1900–1920; 1924; 1928; 1932; 1936; 1948; 1952; 1956; 1960; 1964; 1968; 1972; 1976; 1980; 1984; 1988; 1992; 1996; 2000; 2004; 2008; 2012; 2016; 2020; 2024; 2028

Bulgaria competed at the 1924 Summer Olympics in Paris, France, with 24 athletes competing in 4 sports. It was the first official appearance of the nation at the modern Olympic Games, although some sources claim that Charles Champaud represented Bulgaria in the inaugural 1896 Summer Olympics.

== Athletics ==
Four athletes represented Bulgaria in 1924. It was the nation's debut appearance in the sport.

Ranks given are within the heat.

Athlete	Event	Heats		Quarterfinals		Semifinals		Final	
Athlete	Event	Result	Rank	Result	Rank	Result	Rank	Result	Rank
Lyuben Karastoyanov	1500 m	N/A				Unknown	5	Did not advance	
Kiril Petrunov	400 m	Unknown	4	Did not advance					
Kiril Petrunov	Long jump	N/A				6.00	9	Did not advance	
Kiril Petrunov	Triple jump	N/A				12.015	9	Did not advance	
Anton Tsvetanov	10000 m	N/A						Did not finish	
Vasil Venkov	10000 m	N/A						Did not finish	

== Cycling ==
Seven cyclists represented Bulgaria in 1924. It was the nation's debut in the sport as well as the Games.

=== Road cycling ===
Ranks given are within the heat.

Cyclist	Event	Final	
Cyclist	Event	Result	Rank
Georgi Abadzhiev	Time trial	8:08:35.0	53
Atanas Atanasov	Time trial	Did not finish	
Mikhail Georgiev	Time trial	Did not finish	
Mikhail Klaynerov	Time trial	8:23:18.0	57
Georgi Abadzhiev; Atanas Atanasov; Mikhail Georgiev; Mikhail Klaynerov	Team time trial	Did not finish	

=== Track cycling ===
Ranks given are within the heat.

Cyclist	Event	First round		First repechage		Quarterfinals		Second repechage		Semifinals		Final	
Cyclist	Event	Result	Rank	Result	Rank	Result	Rank	Result	Rank	Result	Rank	Result	Rank
Boris Dimchev	Sprint	Unknown	3 r	Did not start		Did not advance							
Prodan Georgiev	50 km	N/A										Unknown	8–36
Borislav Stoyanov	50 km	N/A										Unknown	8–36

== Equestrian ==
Two equestrians represented Bulgaria in 1924. It was the nation's debut in the sport as well as the Games.

Equestrian	Event	Final		
Equestrian	Event	Score	Time	Rank
Krum Lekarski	Eventing	Did not finish		
Vladimir Stoychev	Dressage	220.2	N/A	17
Vladimir Stoychev	Eventing	533.5	N/A	31

== Football ==
Bulgaria competed in the Olympic football tournament for the first time in 1924.

Round 1
Bye

Round 2

May 28, 1924

Irish Free State	1–0	Bulgaria
Duncan 75'	Report

Stade Olympique, Colombes
Attendance: 1,500
Referee: A. Henriot (FRA)

Final rank
9th place
