= Shooting at the 1924 Summer Olympics – Men's 25 metre rapid fire pistol =

Men's 25 metre rapid fire pistol at the Games of the VIII Olympiad
- Shooting pictogram
- Venue: Le Stand de Tir de Versailles
- Date: 28 June 1924
- Competitors: 55 from 17 nations
- Winning score: 18

Medalists
1st place, gold medalist(s)		Henry Bailey; United States
2nd place, silver medalist(s)		Vilhelm Carlberg; Sweden
3rd place, bronze medalist(s)		Lennart Hannelius; Finland

The men's ISSF 25 meter rapid fire pistol was a shooting sports event held as part of the Shooting at the 1924 Summer Olympics programme. It was the fifth appearance of the event (including the "muzzle-loading pistol" in 1896, the 20 metre pistol in 1900, 30 metre "dueling pistol" in 1912, and 30 metre "revolver" in 1920). The competition was held on 28 June 1924 at the shooting ranges at Versailles. 55 shooters from 17 nations competed. Nations were limited to four shooters each. Henry Bailey won the United States' second consecutive championship in the event (though separated by 12 years). Sweden also earned the same medal as in 1912, with Vilhelm Carlberg's silver. Lennart Hannelius took bronze in Finland's debut in the event.

== Background ==
This was the fifth appearance of what would become standardised as the men's ISSF 25 meter rapid fire pistol event, the only event on the 2020 programme that traces back to 1896. The event has been held at every Summer Olympics except 1904 and 1928 (when no shooting events were held) and 1908; it was open to women from 1968 to 1980. The first five events were quite different, with the 1924 competition being the first that closely resembled a modern rapid fire pistol competition. The scoring system in 1924 was quite different from current scoring, however.

Eleven nations competed in the event for the first time: Argentina, Belgium, Czechoslovakia, Egypt, Finland, Italy, Mexico, the Netherlands, Norway, Poland, and Portugal. France, Great Britain, Greece, and the United States each made their third appearance in the event, tied for most of any nation.

Switzerland withdrew due to their pistols having too much recoil and their team being unable to afford the pistols used by other teams.

== Competition format ==
The format was 18 shots in 3 series of 6 shots each. For each series, there were six separate standing silhouette targets that appeared for 10 seconds; the score for the string was how many targets were hit (there were no scoring rings). Maximum score was thus 18, 1 per shot. Ties were broken through additional series of shots, with the time reduced to 8 seconds per series. One series was shot at a time until the tie was broken.

== Schedule ==
Date	Time	Round
Saturday, 28 June 1924		Final

== Results ==
A maximum of four competitors per nation were allowed. The format consisted of three strings of six targets shot within ten seconds, for a total of 18 targets. Tied competitors fired successive six-shot strings, each completed within eight seconds, until all ties were resolved. The exact results of the shoot-offs are unknown, except the order of elimination and the gold medal shoot-off.

Seven shoot-offs were needed to determine the gold medalist. Bailey's gun jammed after his first shot, but he pulled the spent case out of the breech, and got off the five shots required in what remained of his eight-second time limit.

Rank	Shooter	Nation	Total	Notes
1st place, gold medalist(s)	Henry Bailey	United States	18	Won in seventh tie-breaker (6 hits)
2nd place, silver medalist(s)	Vilhelm Carlberg	Sweden	18	Eliminated in seventh tie-breaker (4 hits)
3rd place, bronze medalist(s)	Lennart Hannelius	Finland	18	Eliminated in fifth tie-breaker
4	Lorenzo Amaya	Argentina	18	Eliminated in fourth tie-breaker
5	Matías Osinalde	Argentina	18	Eliminated in third tie-breaker
6	Arnaud de Castelbajac	France	18	Eliminated in second tie-breaker
7	Unio Sarlin	Finland	18	Eliminated in second tie-breaker
8	Einar Liberg	Norway	18	Eliminated in second tie-breaker
9	André de Schonen	France	17	
9	Bernard Betke	United States	17	
9	William Frazer	United States	17	
9	William Whaling	United States	17	
9	Charles Bounton	Great Britain	17	
9	Marian Borzemski	Poland	17	
9	Eric Carlberg	Sweden	17	
9	António Martins	Portugal	17	
9	Francisco Mendonça	Portugal	17	
9	Manuel Solis	Mexico	17	
9	Krikor Agathon	Egypt	17	
9	Jean Theslöf	Finland	17	
21	Charles Riotteau	France	16	
21	Charles Mackie	Great Britain	16	
21	Jalo Autonen	Finland	16	
21	Víctor Bigand	Argentina	16	
21	François Marits	Netherlands	16	
21	Georges de Crequi-Montfort	France	16	
21	Stanisław Kowalczewski	Poland	16	
21	Walerian Maryański	Poland	16	
21	Alexandros Theofilakis	Greece	16	
30	Sten Forselius	Sweden	15	
30	Rezső Velez	Hungary	15	
30	António Montez	Portugal	15	
30	Tirso Hernández	Mexico	15	
30	Dingenis de Wilde	Netherlands	15	
30	Sikke Bruinsma	Netherlands	15	
30	Carlos Balestrini	Argentina	15	
37	Emilio Piersantelli	Italy	14	
37	Georgios Moraitinis	Greece	14	
37	Emil Werner	Czechoslovakia	14	
40	Philip Griffiths	Great Britain	13	
40	Victor Robert	Belgium	13	
40	François Lafortune Sr.	Belgium	13	
40	Ioannis Theofilakis	Greece	13	
40	António Ferreira	Portugal	13	
40	Jan van Balkum	Netherlands	13	
40	Josef Pavlík	Czechoslovakia	13	
47	Elemér Takács	Hungary	12	
47	Bolesław Gościewicz	Poland	12	
47	Jaroslav Mach	Czechoslovakia	12	
50	Jacques Thuriaux	Belgium	11	
51	Giovanni Scarella	Italy	8	
51	Paul Van Asbroeck	Belgium	8	
53	Sándor Prokopp	Hungary	7	
53	Georgios Vafeiadis	Greece	7	
53	Josef Kruz	Czechoslovakia	7	
