= Victor Hopkins =

Victor Hopkins may refer to:

- Vic Hopkins (1911–1984), English cricketer
- Victor Hopkins (cyclist) (1904–1969), American Olympic cyclist
