= Philip Griffiths =

Philip Griffiths may refer to:

- Philip Jones Griffiths (1936–2008), Welsh photojournalist
- Philip Lewis Griffiths (1881–1945), Australian judge
- Phil Griffiths (footballer) (1905–1978), Welsh international footballer
- Phil Griffiths (cyclist) (born 1949), former English racing cyclist
- Philip Griffiths (diplomat), New Zealand diplomat
- Philip Griffiths (sport shooter)

== See also ==
- Phillip Griffiths (born 1938), American mathematician
- Philip Griffitts (born 1971), American politician
