= René Hamel (cyclist) =

French cyclist

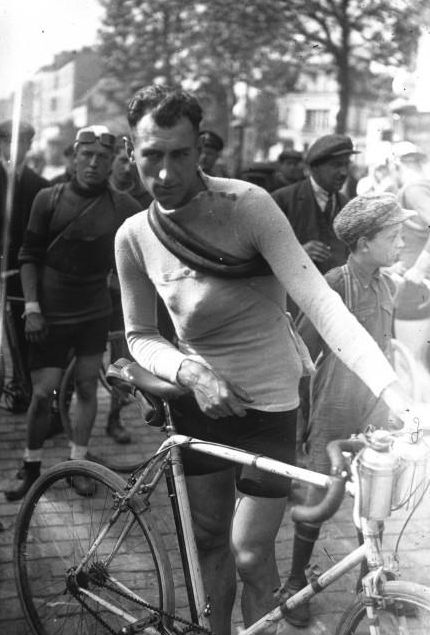

Medal record

Men's cycling

Representing France

Olympic Games
Gold medal – first place	1924 Paris	Team road race
Bronze medal – third place	1924 Paris	Individual road race

René Nicolas Adrien Hamel (14 October 1902 – 7 November 1992) was a French cyclist. He won the gold medal in Team road race along with Armand Blanchonnet and Georges Wambst and won the bronze medal in Individual road race.

Hamel was the father of Jean-Claude Hamel, an Olympic modern pentathlete.
