= Charles Mackie =

Charles Mackie may refer to:

- Charles Mackie (Scottish footballer) (1882–?), played in England and Scotland
- Charles Mackie (New Zealand footballer) (fl. 1936), played once for New Zealand
- Charles Mackie (sport shooter) (1885–?), British sport shooter
- Charles Hodge Mackie (1862–1920), British artist
