= 1922 UCI Road World Championships =

Bicycle Racing

- Venue: Liverpool, United Kingdom
- Date(s): 3 August 1922
- Coordinates: 53.4094°N 2.9785°W
- Nations participating: 5
- Events: 1

The 1922 UCI Road World Championships was the second edition of the UCI Road World Championships, the annual world championships for road bicycle racing. The championships took place in Liverpool, United Kingdom on Thursday 3 August 1922.

In the only race, the men's amateur championship, Great Britain swept the podium with David Marsh taking home the gold medal with fellow British riders in Bill Burkill and Charles Davey claiming the silver and bronze medal respectively.

The qualifications of the 1922 UCI Track Cycling World Championships took place across the Mersey at the Tower Athletic Ground in New Brighton, Merseyside. However, due to persistent rain, the finals were organized in Paris, France on 17 September 1922.

== Events summary ==
Event	Gold		Silver		Bronze	
Men's events
Men's amateur road race	Dave Marsh; Great Britain	5 u. 7 min. 27 sec.	Bill Burkill; Great Britain	+ 1 min. 20 sec.	Charles Davey; Great Britain	+ 5 min. 27 sec.

== Medal table ==
Rank	Nation	Gold	Silver	Bronze	Total
1	Great Britain (GBR)	1	1	1	3
Totals (1 entries)		1	1	1	3

== Results ==
The course was 100 miles (161 km) long.

Place	Rider	Country	Time
1	Dave Marsh	Great Britain	5 u. 7 min. 27 sec.
2	Bill Burkill	Great Britain	+1'20"
3	Charles Davey	Great Britain	+5'27"
4	Gunnar Skoeld	Sweden	+6'25"
5	F. Dredge	Great Britain	+6'33"
6	René Paul Maronnier	France	+8'27"
7	Henry-Peter Hansen	Denmark	+12'03"
8	Sigfrid Lundberg	Sweden	+13'13"
9	Jan Maas	Netherlands	+15'27"
10	Ragnar Malm	Sweden	+18'40"
11	Fernand Coldeboeuf	France	+22'22"

== See also ==
- 1922 UCI Track Cycling World Championships
