= Vafeiadis =

Vafeiadis is a surname. Notable people with the surname include:

- Georgios Vafeiadis (born 1894), Greek sports shooter
- Markos Vafeiadis (1906–1992), Greek politician
