= António Montez =

António Montez may refer to:

- António Montez (sport shooter) (1885–1968), Portuguese sports shooter
- António Montez (footballer) (born 2001), Portuguese footballer
