= Hannelius =

Hannelius is a surname. Notable people with the surname include:

- G Hannelius (born 1998), American actress and singer-songwriter
- Lennart Hannelius (1893–1950), Finnish sport shooter
