= Truban =

Truban is a Slovak surname. Notable people with the surname include:

- Michal Truban (born 1983), Slovak businessman and politician
- Milan Truban (1904–1929), Yugoslav cyclist
- William Truban (1924–2007), American politician
