= Forselius =

Origin
- Meaning: (name) Forsel + Latin suffix -ius

Forselius is a surname. It may refer to:

- Bengt Gottfried Forselius (c. 1660–1688), Estonian scholar
- Johann Forselius (d. 1684), Estonian scholar
- Sten Forselius (1890–1937), Swedish Olympic athlete
- Emil Forselius (1974–2010), Swedish actor
- Jesper Forselius, first drummer of the Swedish band The Kristet Utseende
