= Riotte =

Riotte is a surname. Notable people with the surname include:

- Charles N. Riotte (1814–1887), American diplomat
- Franziska Riotte (1845–1922), German painter and writer
- Jules C. E. Riotte (1901–2000), German-born priest of the Ukrainian Greek Catholic Church
- Philipp Jakob Riotte (1776–1856), German composer
- Raymond Riotte (1940–2026), French road bicycle racer

== See also ==
- Riot Ten (born 1992), American DJ and record producer
- Charles Riotteau (1875–1954), French sports shooter
