= Víctor Bigand =

Argentine sports shooter

Personal information
- Born: 11 May 1901

Sport
- Sport: Sports shooting

Víctor Bigand (born 11 May 1901, date of death unknown) was an Argentine sports shooter. He competed in the 25 m rapid fire pistol event at the 1924 Summer Olympics.
