= Erik Andersen (cyclist) =

Danish cyclist

Personal information
- Born: 15 August 1902 Sjælland, Denmark
- Died: 2 January 1980 (aged 77) Hovedstaden, Denmark

Cycling career
- Sport: Cycling

Erik Eloe Andersen (15 August 1902 – 2 January 1980) was a Danish cyclist. He competed in the individual time trial event at the 1924 Summer Olympics.
