= Mihály Rusovszky =

Hungarian cyclist

Personal information
- Born: 21 September 1894
- Died: July 1979 (aged 84)

Cycling career
- Sport: Cycling

Mihály Rusovszky (21 September 1894 – July 1979) was a Hungarian cyclist. He competed in the individual time trial event at the 1924 Summer Olympics.
