= Sidney Ramsden =

Australian cyclist

Personal information
- Born: 28 March 1901 Clifton Hill, Victoria, Australia
- Died: 24 March 1975 (aged 73) Melbourne, Victoria, Australia

Cycling career
- Sport: Cycling

Sidney Ramsden (28 March 1901 – 24 March 1975) was an Australian cyclist. He competed in the individual time trial event at the 1924 Summer Olympics.
