= Arnaud de Castelbajac =

French sports shooter

Personal information
- Born: 4 May 1871
- Died: 5 November 1949 (aged 78)

Sport
- Sport: Sports shooting

Arnaud de Castelbajac (4 May 1871 – 5 November 1949) was a French sports shooter. He competed in the 25 m rapid fire pistol event at the 1924 Summer Olympics.
