= Bernard Betke =

American sport shooter

Personal information
- Born: April 12, 1891 Milwaukee, Wisconsin, United States
- Died: April 18, 1975 (aged 84) Beaufort, South Carolina, United States

Sport
- Sport: Sports shooting

Bernard George Betke (April 12, 1891 – April 18, 1975) was an American sport shooter who competed in the 1924 Summer Olympics.

In 1924, he finished in 10th place in the 25 m rapid fire pistol competition.

He was born in Milwaukee, Wisconsin and died in Beaufort, South Carolina.
