= Henry Bailey (sport shooter) =

American sport shooter

Personal information
- Born: April 24, 1893 Colleton County, South Carolina, U.S.
- Died: November 1, 1972 (aged 79) Walterboro, South Carolina, U.S.

Sport
- Sport: Sports shooting
Medal record
Men's shooting
Representing United States
Olympic Games
Gold medal – first place	1924 Paris	25 m rapid fire pistol

Henry Marvin Bailey (April 24, 1893 – November 1, 1972) was an American sport shooter who competed in the 1924 Summer Olympics, winning the gold medal in the 25 m rapid fire pistol event. He was born in Colleton County, South Carolina and died in Walterboro, South Carolina.
