= Voškoniai =

- Village
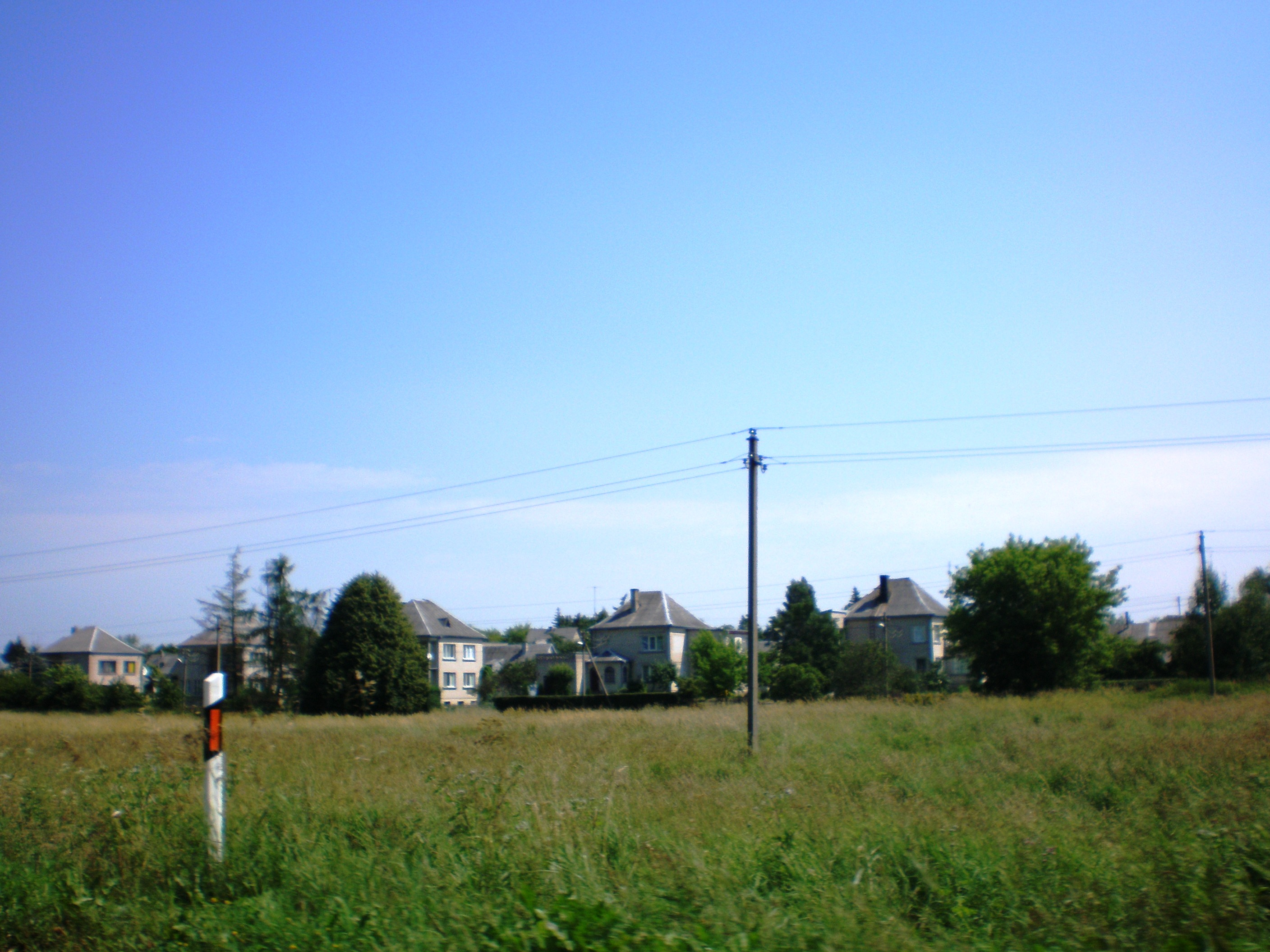

- Location of Voškoniai
- Coordinates: 54°59′31″N 23°57′00″E
- Country: Lithuania
- Ethnographic region: Aukštaitija
- County: Kaunas County
- Municipality: Kaunas district municipality
- Eldership: Domeikava eldership

Population (2011)
  - Total: 880
- Time zone: UTC+2 (EET)
  - Summer (DST): UTC+3 (EEST)

Voškoniai is a village in the Kaunas district municipality, Lithuania. It is located 3 km (1.9 mi) north east of Domeikava. Eigirgala library, established in 1953, is in Voškoniai. According to the 2011 census, the village had 880 residents.

== Notable residents ==
- Bolesław Gościewicz
