= Charles Bounton =

British sport shooter

Personal information
- Born: 23 April 1881 Alverstoke, Hampshire, England
- Died: 22 December 1968 (aged 87) Croydon, London, England

Sport
- Sport: Sports shooting

Charles Edward Bounton (23 April 1881 – 22 December 1968) was a British sport shooter who competed in the 1924 Summer Olympics. In 1924, he finished in 13th place in the 25 m rapid fire pistol competition.
