= Matías Osinalde =

Argentine sports shooter

Personal information
- Born: 1886
- Died: Unknown

Sport
- Sport: Sports shooting

Matías Osinalde (born 1886, date of death unknown) was an Argentine sports shooter. He competed in the 25 m rapid fire pistol event at the 1924 Summer Olympics.
