= Ferenc Steiner =

Hungarian cyclist

Personal information
- Born: 16 September 1888 Budapest, Hungary
- Died: 30 June 1967 (aged 78)

Cycling career
- Sport: Cycling

Ferenc Steiner (16 September 1888 – 30 June 1967) was a Hungarian cyclist. He competed in the individual time trial event at the 1924 Summer Olympics.
