= Jacques Thuriaux =

Belgian sports shooter

Sport
- Sport: Sports shooting

Jacques Thuriaux was a Belgian sports shooter. He competed in the 25 m rapid fire pistol event at the 1924 Summer Olympics.
