= Jean-Claude Hamel (pentathlete) =

French modern pentathlete (1931–2025)

Personal information
- Full name: Jean-Claude Raymond Hamel
- Born: 19 January 1931 Paris, France
- Died: 4 May 2025 (aged 94) Vétraz-Monthoux, France
- Parent: René Hamel (father)

Sport
- Sport: Modern pentathlon

Jean-Claude Raymond Hamel (19 January 1931 – 4 May 2025) was a French modern pentathlete. He competed at the 1956 Summer Olympics. Hamel died on 4 May 2025, at the age of 94.
