= 1921 UCI Road World Championships =

- Venue: Copenhagen, Denmark
- Date(s): 4 August 1921
- Coordinates: 55°40′N 12°34′E
- Nations participating: 5
- Events: 1

The 1921 UCI Road World Championships (the annual world championships for bicycle road racing organized by the Union Cycliste Internationale) took place in Copenhagen, Denmark on Thursday 4 August 1921. It was the first official World Championships organized by the UCI. The championships were only for amateur men. Four men per nation could participate.

From 30 July to 8 August, the 1921 UCI Track Cycling World Championships were organized on the velodrome of Ordrup, near Copenhagen.

== Events summary ==
Event	Gold		Silver		Bronze	
Men's events
Men's amateur road race	Gunnar Sköld; Sweden	6 h. 18 min. 17 sec.	Willum Nielsen; Denmark	+ 4 min. 53 sec.	Charles Davey; Great Britain	+ 5 min. 28 sec.

Sweden won the nations classification (total time of the first four riders per nation) ahead of France and Denmark.

== Medal table ==
Rank	Nation	Gold	Silver	Bronze	Total
1	Sweden (SWE)	1	0	0	1
2	Denmark (DEN)	0	1	0	1
3	Great Britain (GBR)	0	0	1	1
Totals (3 entries)		1	1	1	3

== Results ==
The course was 190 km with the finish in Glostrup.

Place	Rider	Country	Time
1	Gunnar Sköld	Sweden	6 h. 18 min. 17 sec.
2	Willum Nielsen	Denmark	6 h. 23 min. 10 sec.
3	Charles Davey	Great Britain	6 h. 23 min. 45 sec.
4	Fernand Canteloube	France	6 h. 28 min. 9 sec. 4/5
5	Ragnar Malm	Sweden	6 h. 29 min. 24 sec.
6	Marcel Huot	France	6 h. 32 min. 0 sec.
7	Frederik Ahrensborg Clausen	Denmark	6 h. 36 min. 13 sec. 2/5
8	Algot Persson	Sweden	6 h. 39 min. 6 sec.
9	Marcel Gobillot	France	6 h. 39 min. 17 sec. 1/5
10	Henrik Morén	Sweden	6 h. 41 min. 15 sec.
11	Orla Larsen	Denmark	6 h. 44 min. 17 sec.
12	Dave Marsh	Great Britain	6 h. 45 min. 48 sec.
13	Jack Rossiter	Great Britain	6 h. 47 min. 29 sec.
14	Henri George	Belgium	+37'31"
15	Albert Cantou	France	+48'34"
16	Edmund Hansen	Denmark	+56'40"
17	Arie Krijgsman	Netherlands	+1h 17'04"

== See also ==
- 1921 UCI Track Cycling World Championships
