= Jan van Balkum =

Dutch sports shooter

Personal information
- Born: 29 February 1888 Rossum, Gelderland, Netherlands
- Died: 17 May 1978 (aged 90) Rossum, Gelderland, Netherlands

Sport
- Sport: Sports shooting

Jan van Balkum (29 February 1888 – 17 May 1978) was a Dutch sports shooter. He competed in the 25 m rapid fire pistol event at the 1924 Summer Olympics.
