= Josef Kruz =

Czechoslovak sports shooter

Personal information
- Born: 1889
- Died: Unknown

Sport
- Sport: Sports shooting

Josef Kruz (born 1889, date of death unknown) was a Czechoslovak sports shooter. He competed in the 25 m rapid fire pistol event at the 1924 Summer Olympics.
