= Tirso Hernández =

Mexican sports shooter

Personal information
- Born: 13 August 1892 Rioverde, San Luis Potosí, Mexico
- Died: 9 December 1985 (aged 93)

Sport
- Sport: Sports shooting

Tirso Hernández (13 August 1892 – 9 December 1985) was a Mexican sports shooter. He competed in the 25 m rapid fire pistol event at the 1924 Summer Olympics. Hernández was also the President of the Mexican Olympic Committee from 1929 to 1951.
