= Emilio Piersantelli =

Italian sports shooter

Personal information
- Born: 1888 Ascoli Piceno, Italy
- Died: Unknown

Sport
- Sport: Sports shooting

Emilio Piersantelli (born 1888, date of death unknown) was an Italian sports shooter. He competed in the 25 m rapid fire pistol event at the 1924 Summer Olympics.
