= William Frazer (sport shooter) =

American sport shooter

Personal information
- Born: January 11, 1884 Niagara Falls, New York, United States
- Died: August 17, 1963 (aged 79) Seattle, Washington, United States

Sport
- Sport: Sports shooting

William David Frazer (January 11, 1884 – August 17, 1963) was an American sport shooter who competed in the 1924 Summer Olympics.

In 1924, he finished in 11th place in the 25 m rapid fire pistol competition.

He was born in Niagara Falls, New York and died in Seattle, Washington.

Frazer served as a colonel in the Coast Artillery Corps, U.S. Army. While a major, he authored the book American Pistol Shooting (New York: Dutton, 1929).
