= Sikke Bruinsma =

Dutch sports shooter

Personal information
- Born: 5 April 1889 Joure, Netherlands
- Died: 27 February 1963 (aged 73) Groningen, Netherlands

Sport
- Sport: Sports shooting

Sikke Bruinsma (5 April 1889 – 27 February 1963) was a Dutch sports shooter. He competed in the 25 m rapid fire pistol event at the 1924 Summer Olympics.
