= Lennart Hannelius =

Finnish sport shooter

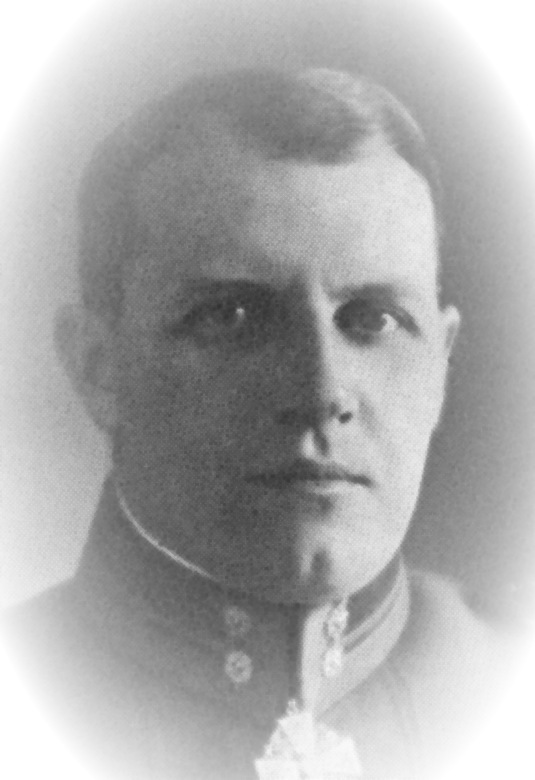

Personal information
- Born: 8 November 1893 Hanko, Finland
- Died: 4 May 1950 (aged 56) Stockholm, Sweden

Sport
- Sport: Sports shooting
Medal record
Men's shooting
Representing Finland
Olympic Games
Bronze medal – third place	1924 Paris	25 m rapid fire pistol

Lennart Vilhelm Hannelius (8 November 1893 – 4 May 1950) was a Finnish sport shooter who competed in the 1924 Summer Olympics. He won the bronze medal in the 25 m rapid fire pistol event.

He led the Finnish shooting team at the 1927 World Shooting Championships in Rome.
