= Walerian Maryański =

Polish sports shooter

Personal information
- Born: 2 January 1875; Stulsku, Kingdom of Galicia and Lodomeria, Austria-Hungary
- Died: 6 May 1946 (aged 71); Kraków, Poland

Sport
- Sport: Sports shooting

Walerian Maryański (2 January 1875 – 6 May 1946) was a Polish sports shooter. He competed in the 25 m rapid fire pistol event at the 1924 Summer Olympics.
