= António Montez (sport shooter) =

Portuguese sports shooter

Personal information
- Born: 4 April 1885
- Died: 1968 (aged 82–83)

Sport
- Sport: Sports shooting

António Duarte Montez (4 April 1885 – 1968) was a Portuguese sports shooter. He competed in the 25 m rapid fire pistol event at the 1924 Summer Olympics.
