= Frans Mahn =

Dutch cyclist

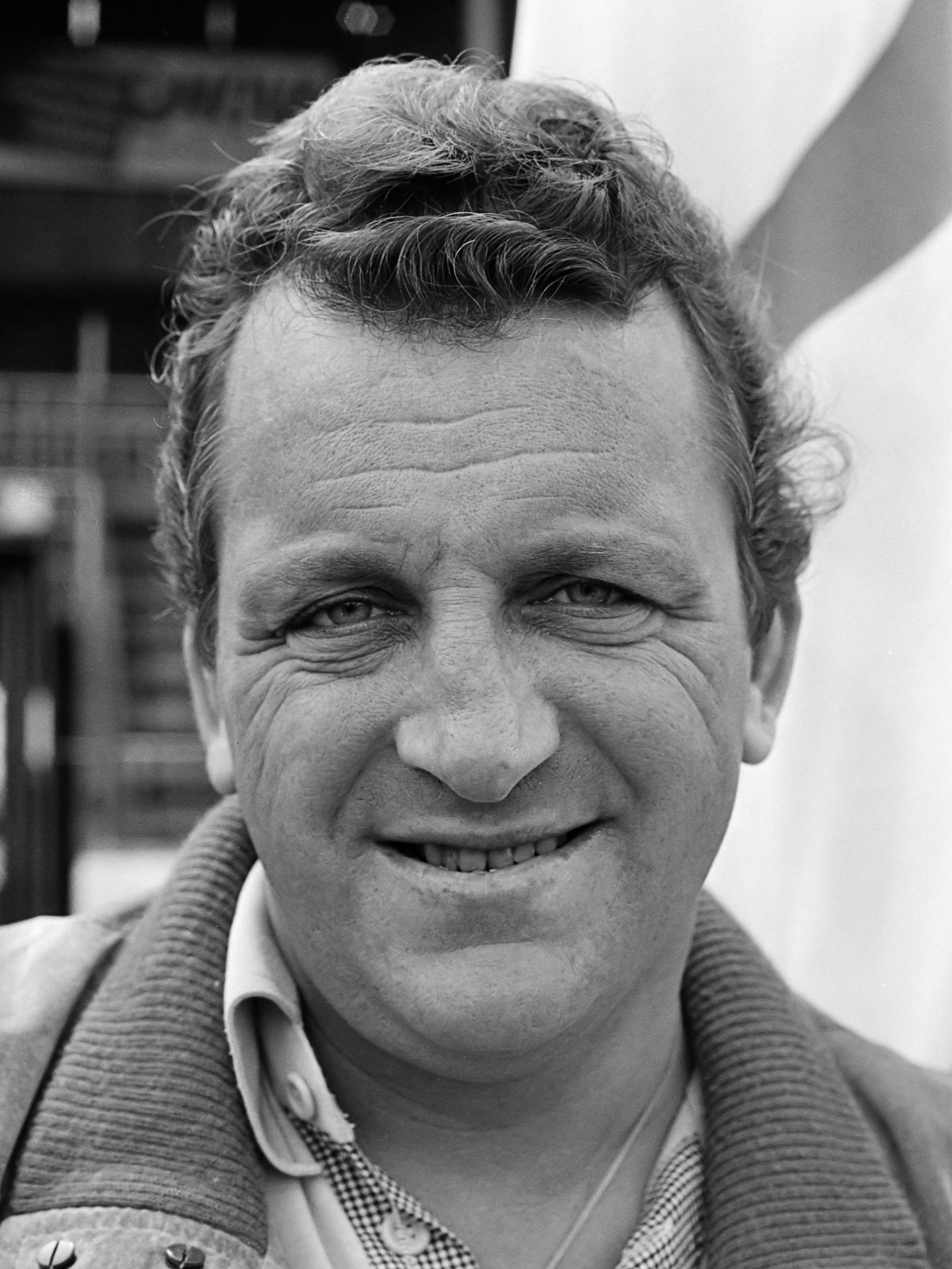
- Frans Mahn in 1978

Personal information
- Born: 24 June 1933 Amsterdam, the Netherlands
- Died: 26 March 1995 (aged 61) Hoofddorp, the Netherlands

Sport
- Sport: Cycling
Medal record
Representing the Netherlands
UCI Road World Championships
Gold medal – first place	1956 Copenhagen	Road race

Frans Mahn (24 June 1933 – 26 March 1995) was a Dutch cyclist who was active between 1952 and 1967. He won the road race at the 1956 UCI Road World Championships, as well as the Ronde van Limburg (1953) and two national sprint titles (1966, 1967). After retiring from competitions he worked as a cycling coach with the Royal Dutch Cycling Union.
