= Erik Bjurberg =

Swedish cyclist

Personal information
- Full name: Erik Albert Bjurberg
- Born: 1 June 1895 Solna, Sweden
- Died: 22 June 1976 (aged 81) Bandhagen, Sweden

Cycling career
- Sport: Cycling
Medal record
Men's road bicycle racing
Representing Sweden
Olympic Games
| Bronze medal – third place | 1924 Paris | Team road race |

Erik Albert Bjurberg (1 June 1895 – 22 June 1976) was a Swedish road racing cyclist who won the bronze medal in the 1924 Summer Olympics.
