= Vic Hopkins =

English cricketer

Personal information
- Full name: Victor Hopkins
- Born: 21 January 1911; Dumbleton, Gloucestershire, England
- Died: 6 August 1984 (aged 73); Dumbleton, Gloucestershire, England
- Batting: Right-handed
- Role: Wicket-keeper

Domestic team information
- Years: Team
- 1934–1948: Gloucestershire

Career statistics
Competition	FC
Matches	139
Runs scored	2608
Batting average	14.81
100s/50s	0/8
Top score	83*
Catches/stumpings	138/44
- Source: Cricinfo, 3 August 2013

Victor Hopkins (21 January 1911 – 6 August 1984) was an English cricketer who played in 139 first-class matches for Gloucestershire between 1934 and 1948. In his early first-class career, Hopkins was played as a wicket-keeper, but loss of form and injury meant that he was replaced behind the stumps, and in his last two seasons of regular Gloucestershire cricket, 1938 and 1939, he mainly appeared as a batter, sometimes opening the innings.

Hopkins' obituary in Wisden Cricketers' Almanack (published a year late, in the 1986 edition) recounts that he "came straight from village cricket to keep wicket for the county in May 1934". The 1935 edition of Wisden recorded that "at the outset he showed remarkable form," but "about the middle of the season he had a bad spell with the result that in August he stood down".
