= Charles Mackie (sport shooter) =

British sports shooter

Personal information
- Born: 22 May 1886
- Died: 31 May 1964 (aged 78)

Sport
- Sport: Sports shooting

Charles Herbert Mackie (22 May 1886 – 31 May 1964) was a British sports shooter. He competed in the 25 m rapid fire pistol event at the 1924 Summer Olympics.
