= Sten Forselius =

Swedish sports shooter

Personal information
- Born: 3 December 1890 Stockholm, Sweden
- Died: 31 January 1937 (aged 46) Undersåker, Sweden

Sport
- Sport: Sports shooting

Sten Forselius (3 December 1890 – 31 January 1937) was a Swedish sports shooter. He competed in the 25 m rapid fire pistol event at the 1924 Summer Olympics.
