= Jan Buis =

Dutch cyclist

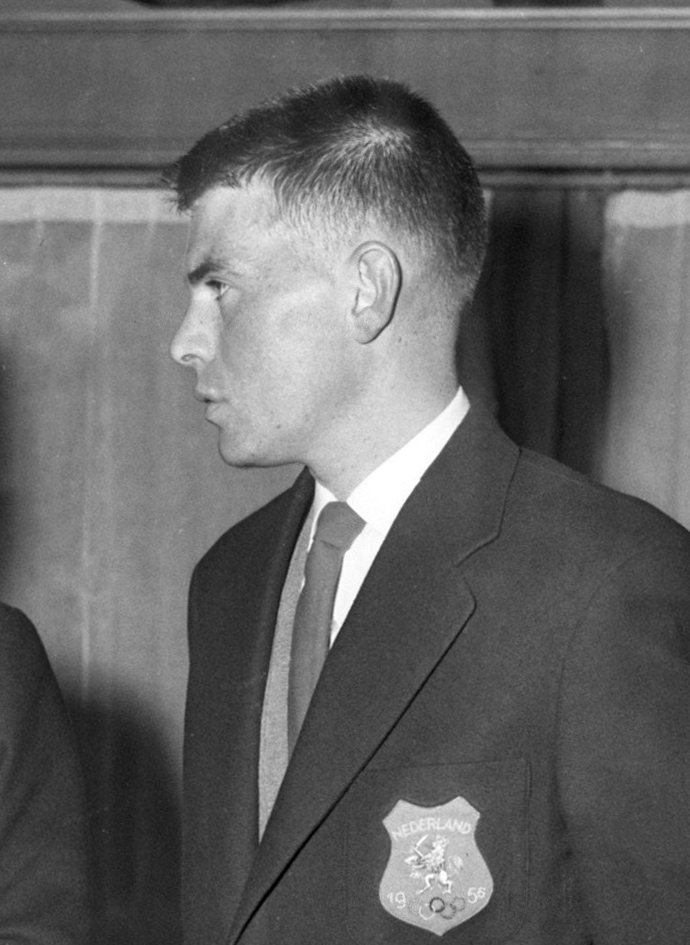
- Jan Buis in the 1956 Dutch Olympic suit

Personal information
- Born: 15 February 1933 (age 93) Badhoevedorp, the Netherlands

Sport
- Sport: Road cycling
Medal record
Representing the Netherlands
World championships
Bronze medal – third place	1956 Copenhagen	Road race, amateurs

Jan Buis (born 15 February 1933) is a retired Dutch road cyclist who won a bronze medal at the 1956 World Championships. He was selected for the 1956 Olympics, but could not compete because of their boycott by the Netherlands. He has a twin brother Wim.
