= 1956 UCI Road World Championships =

Cycling competition

- Venue: Copenhagen, Denmark
- Date: 25–26 August 1956
- Coordinates: 55°40′N 12°34′E
- Events: 2

The 1956 UCI Road World Championships was the 29th edition of the UCI Road World Championships. It took place in Copenhagen, Denmark on Saturday 25 (amateurs) and Sunday 26 August (professionals) on a circuit measuring 12.96 km near Ballerup.

The title race among the professionals was dominated by the Belgian riders, who occupied five of the first six places. "Rik I" (Rik Van Steenbergen) made it through in a group sprint from "Rik II" (Rik Van Looy). Forty-year-old Gerrit Schulte finished third. For Van Steenbergen, it was the second world title, seven years after his first, which he had also won in Copenhagen.

Among the amateurs, Dutchman Frans Mahn triumphed in a bunch sprint.

The 1956 UCI Track Cycling World Championships took place in the Ordrup velodrome, near Copenhagen, from 27 August to 2 September 1956.

== Events Summary ==
Event	Gold		Silver		Bronze	
Men's Events
Professional Road Race	Rik Van Steenbergen; Belgium	7h 26' 15"	Rik Van Looy; Belgium	s.t.	Gerrit Schulte; Netherlands	s.t.
Amateur Road Race	Frans Mahn; Netherlands	-	Norbert Veroughstraete; Belgium	-	Jan Buis; Netherlands	-

== See also ==
- 1956 UCI Track Cycling World Championships
