= Charlie Davey (cyclist) =

British racing cyclist

Charles (Charlie) Frederick Davey
Personal information
- Full name: Charles Frederick Davey
- Nickname: Charlie
- Born: 27 August 1886 Croydon, England, United Kingdom
- Died: 7 October 1964 (aged 78) Beckenham, London

Cycling career
- Sport: Cycling
- Discipline: Road
- Role: Rider

Amateur team
- 1906–1922: –

Professional team
- 1923: New Hudson bicycle company

Major wins
- 1914 SRRA 50-mile record with Harry Paul; London-Worthing-London record Land's End to London record (twice); 24-hour record with 402 miles London to Portsmouth and back record London to Bath record
Medal record
Men's road bicycle racing
Representing Great Britain
World Championships
Bronze medal – third place	1921 Copenhagen	Amateur's Road Race
Bronze medal – third place	1922 Liverpool	Amateur's Road Race

Charles Frederick Davey (27 August 1886 – 7 October 1964) was a British racing cyclist who rode in the Olympic Games, the world championship and the marathon Bol d'Or race.

== Career ==
Davey originally played football. He also tried athletics. At 17, he came third in a 12-mile walk promoted by tradesmen in Addiscombe, Surrey. He competed for East Surrey Harriers. He started cycling when his brothers persuaded him to try racing on a grass track in another event the tradesmen ran. He won five prizes.

In 1910, he joined the Vegetarian Cycling and Athletic Club and then moved to the Addiscombe CC, which he founded in 1906. His first road win was for the Addiscombe club in the Olympian CC 50-mile time trial, held between Crawley and Godstone. He won by eight minutes in 2h 35m 0s.

In 1911. he finished third in the Anerley 12-hour time-trial. That qualified him to ride for Britain in the 1912 Olympic Games road race in Stockholm. The race was run over 200 miles around lake Mälaren. The organisation was chaotic, with riders bunching together instead of being separated, cars impeding the competitors and errors in time-keeping.

Davey won his first record when, in 1914, he partnered with Harry Paul to beat the Southern Road Records Association 50-mile time, followed two weeks later by London-Worthing-London.

War interrupted his career, and he became a petty officer in the Royal Naval Air Service and a forerunner of the Royal Air Force. He was stationed in the Orkney Islands, where he swam two miles to a buoy in Scapa Flow and back again.

In 1920, Davey won seven track events: the Balham 50-mile time trial, the Anerley 12-hour and the Lincolnshire championships at 25, 50 and 100 miles. He was selected for the Olympic Games in Antwerp as a reserve. He waited until the complete team had arrived at the ferry port in Harwich, then rode the Anerley for 12 hours to finish second to Maurice Selbach.

His best year was 1921, the year of the first cycling world road race championship. Davey was 34.

Britain ran the world championship in 1922, again run as a time trial, in Shropshire. Dave Marsh of Britain won. Davey came third, and Britain won a gold medal as the best team.

Davey turned professional the following year for the New Hudson bicycle company. He beat the Land's End to London record by 1hr 55m, then the 24-hour record with 402 miles and Land's End to London again in 17h 29m. He went to Paris to ride the Bol d'Or marathon race on the Buffalo velodrome. He finished sixth, the winner being Oscar Egg after 550 miles.

Davey's last year was when he was 40. He beat the London to Portsmouth and back record by 12 minutes and set the London to Bath and back record at 11h 47m 52s. In retirement, he managed other riders' record attempts and arranged or scheduled many rides between 1926 and 1960.

Addiscombe Cycling Club gave him a gold-plated spanner in 1959 for his work for the club.

He was celebrated in Golden Book of Cycling in 1959.
