= Georgios Vafeiadis =

Greek sports shooter

Personal information
- Born: 1894 Volos, Greece
- Died: Unknown

Sport
- Sport: Sports shooting

Georgios Vafeiadis (born 1894, date of death unknown) was a Greek sports shooter. He competed in the 25 m rapid fire pistol event at the 1924 Summer Olympics.
