= Joop Demmenie =

Dutch cyclist

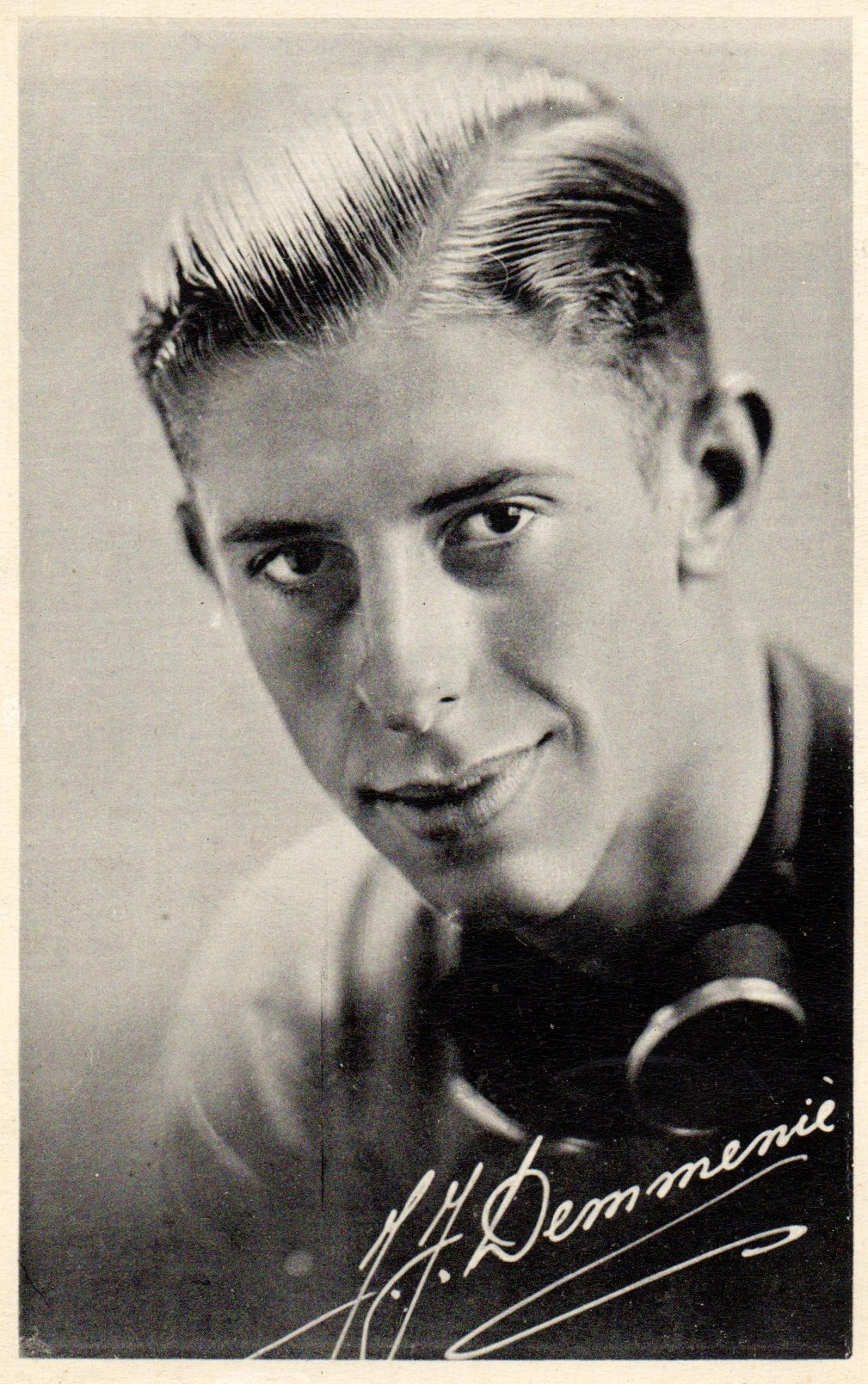

Personal information
- Nickname: Johannes Jacobus Demmenie
- Born: 19 December 1918 Rotterdam, Netherlands
- Died: 3 June 1991 (aged 72)

Cycling career
- Sport: Cycling
- Discipline: Road cycling
- Role: Rider
Medal record
World Championships
Bronze medal – third place	1938 Valkenburg	Amateur road race

Joop Demmenie (19 December 1918 – 3 June 1991) was a road cyclist from Netherlands. After he finished fourth in the amateur road race at the 1937 UCI Road World Championships, he won the bronze medal at the 1938 UCI Road World Championships in the men's amateur road race. He was a professional cyclist between 1939 and 1948. In 1939 he won Brussel-Hozémont.
