= Kiril Petrunov =

Bulgarian sprinter and footballer

- Born: 1901
- Died: 1971 (aged 69–70)
- Sports career
- Sport: Sprinting
- Event: 400 metres
Association football career
- Position: Forward
Senior career*
Years	Team	Apps	(Gls)
1923–1931	Levski Sofia	24	(8)
- * Club domestic league appearances and goals

Kiril Petrunov (1901 – 1971) was a Bulgarian sprinter and footballer. He competed in the men's 400 metres at the 1924 Summer Olympics. and was the first flag bearer for Bulgaria. He was also a long-time football player for Levski Sofia.
