= Georges Wambst =

French cyclist

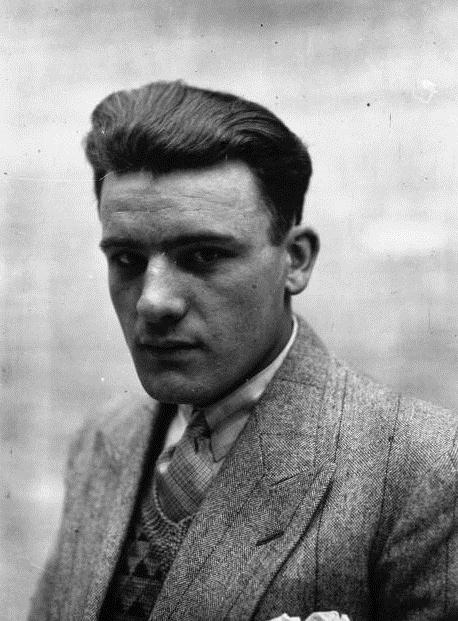
- Wambst in 1928

Personal information
- Full name: Georges Eugène Wambst
- Nickname: Le Frelon
- Born: 21 July 1902 Lunéville, France
- Died: 1 August 1988 (aged 86) Antibes, France
- Height: 172 cm (5 ft 8 in)
- Weight: 72 kg (159 lb)

Cycling career
- Sport: Cycling
Medal record
Men's road bicycle racing
Representing France
Olympic Games
Gold medal – first place	1924 Paris	Team road race

Georges Eugène Wambst (21 July 1902 – 1 August 1988) was a French cyclist. He won the gold medal in Team road race along with Armand Blanchonnet and René Hamel in the 1924 Summer Olympics.

He died on 1 August 1988.
