= Charles Riotteau =

French sports shooter

Personal information
- Born: 20 May 1875
- Died: 9 April 1954 (aged 78)

Sport
- Sport: Sports shooting

Charles Riotteau (20 May 1875 – 9 April 1954) was a French sports shooter. He competed in the 25 m rapid fire pistol event at the 1924 Summer Olympics.
