= Konrad Winkler (fencer) =

Polish fencer

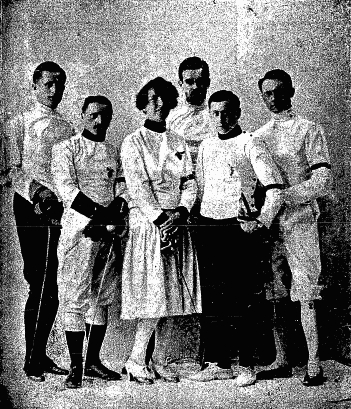
- Fencers team AZS Kraków in 1922. Second from the left is Konrad Winkler.

Personal information
- Born: 20 January 1882; Warsaw, Congress Poland
- Died: 16 January 1962 (aged 79); Kraków, Poland

Sport
- Sport: Fencing

Konrad Sebastian Winkler (20 January 1882 – 16 January 1962) was a Polish fencer. He competed in the individual foil and team sabre at the 1924 Summer Olympics.
