= Władysław Świątek =

Polish sports shooter

Personal information
- Born: 5 December 1897 Inowrocław, Grand Duchy of Posen, German Empire
- Died: 28 January 1930 (aged 32) Inowrocław, Poland

Sport
- Sport: Sports shooting

Władysław Świątek (5 December 1897 – 28 January 1930) was a Polish sports shooter. He competed in two events at the 1924 Summer Olympics.
