= Philip Griffiths (sport shooter) =

British sport shooter

Personal information
- Born: 14 August 1892
- Died: 29 October 1972 (aged 80)

Sport
- Sport: Sports shooting

Philip Griffiths (14 August 1892 – 29 October 1972) was a British sport shooter who competed in the 1924 Summer Olympics. In 1924, he finished in 40th place in the 25 metre rapid fire pistol competition.
