= Philippus Innemee =

Dutch cyclist

Personal information
- Born: 4 December 1902 The Hague, Netherlands
- Died: 10 September 1963 (aged 60) Wassenaar, Netherlands

Cycling career
- Sport: Cycling

Philippus Innemee (4 December 1902 – 10 September 1963) was a Dutch cyclist. He competed in two events at the 1924 Summer Olympics.

== See also ==
- List of Dutch Olympic cyclists
