= David Marsh (cyclist) =

British cyclist

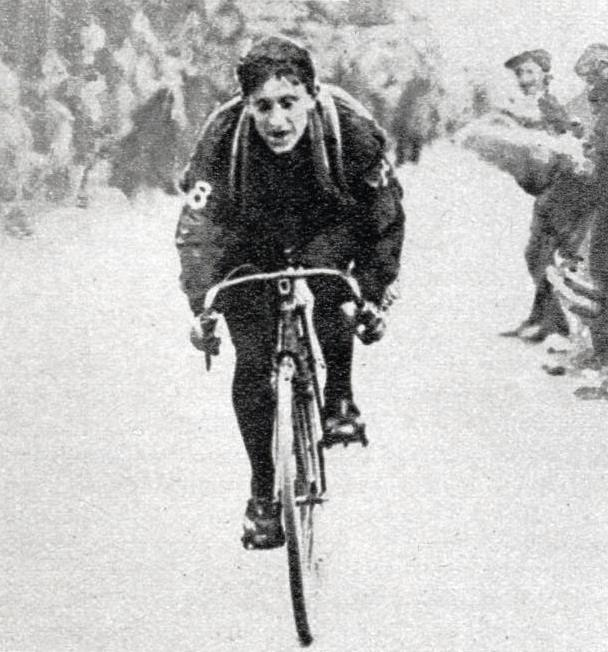
- Marsh in 1922

Personal information
- Born: 28 December 1894 Poplar, London, England
- Died: 1960 (aged 65–66) Epping, Essex, England

Cycling career
- Sport: Cycling

Amateur team
- University Cycling Club, London

David Broadhead Robertson Marsh (28 December 1894 – 1960) was a British cyclist. He competed at the 1920 and the 1924 Summer Olympics. He won a gold medal in the men's amateur road race at the 1922 UCI Road World Championships, after he finished 12th in 1921.
