= Koloman Sović =

Croatian cyclist

Personal information
- Born: 22 July 1899 Mali Bukovec, Kingdom of Croatia-Slavonia, Austria-Hungary
- Died: 23 January 1971 (aged 71) Buenos Aires, Argentina

Cycling career
- Sport: Cycling

Koloman Sović (22 July 1899 – 23 January 1971) was a Croatian cyclist who competed in two events at the 1924 Summer Olympics for Yugoslavia.
