= Nic Rausch =

Luxembourgish cyclist

Personal information
- Full name: Nicolas Rausch
- Born: 20 August 1900 Bigonville, Rambrouch, Luxembourg
- Died: 13 March 1977 (aged 76)

Cycling career
- Sport: Cycling

Nicolas "Nic" Rausch (20 August 1900 in Bigonville – 13 March 1977) was a Luxembourgish cyclist. He competed in two events at the 1924 Summer Olympics.
