= Stanisław Kowalczewski =

Polish sports shooter

Personal information
- Born: 22 February 1890; Dąbrowa Górnicza, Congress Poland
- Died: 18 October 1939 (aged 49); Warsaw, German-occupied Poland

Sport
- Sport: Sports shooting

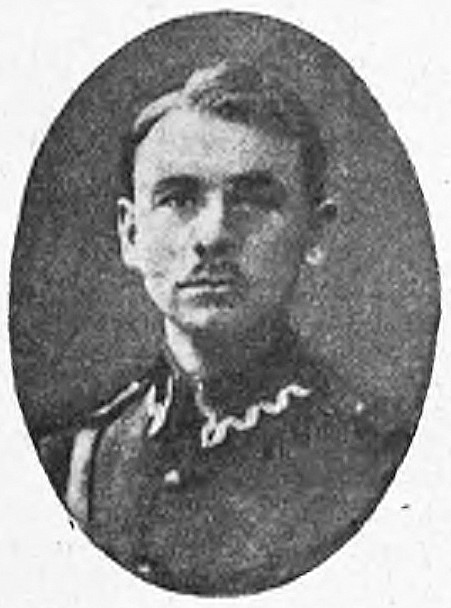

Stanisław Kowalczewski (22 February 1890 – 18 October 1939) was a Polish sports shooter. He competed in three events at the 1924 Summer Olympics.
