= Cor Heeren =

Dutch cyclist

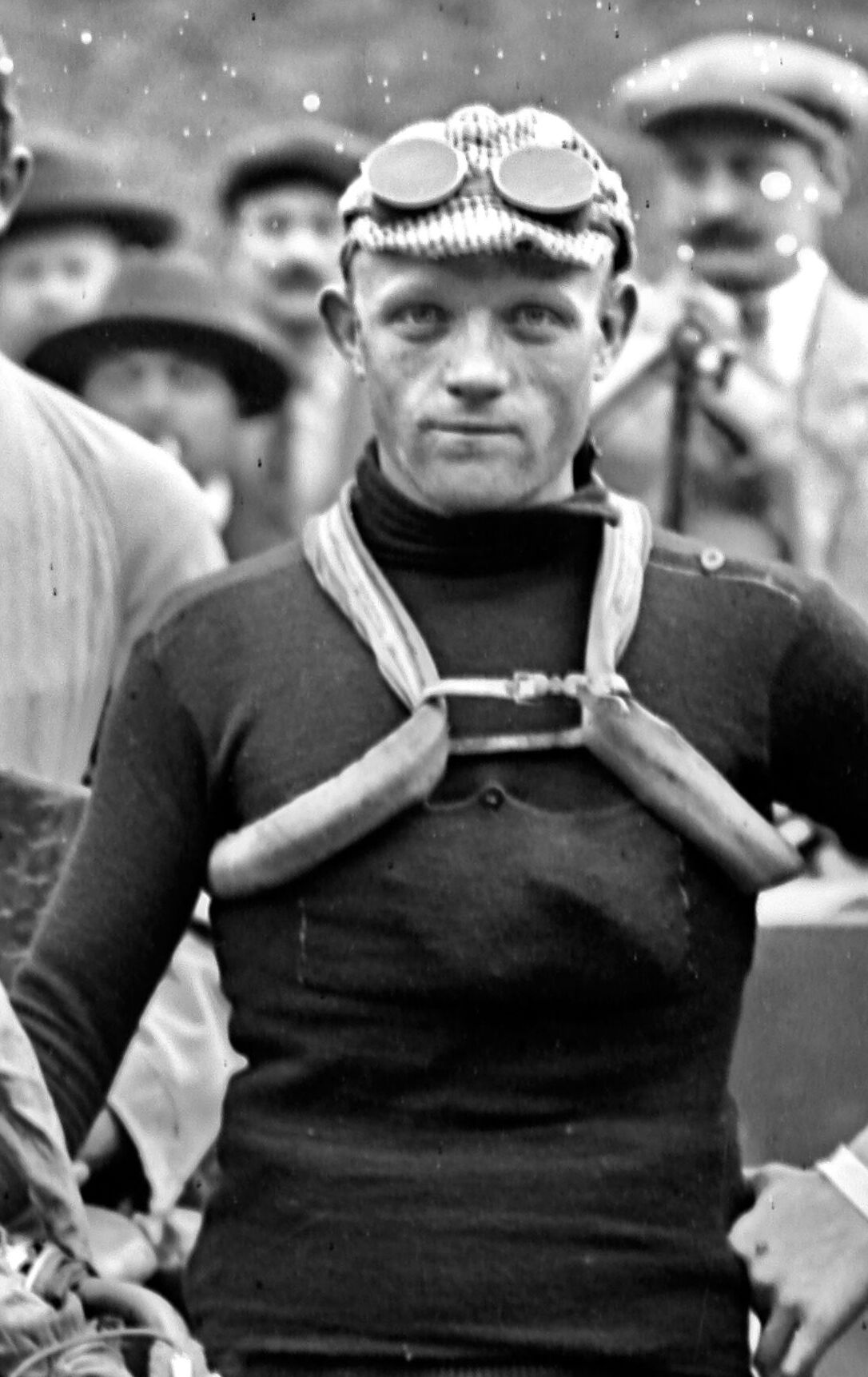
- Cor Heeren in 1924

Personal information
- Born: 5 December 1900 Oudenbosch, Netherlands
- Died: 7 May 1976 (aged 75) Oudenbosch, Netherlands

Cycling career
- Sport: Cycling

Cor Heeren (5 December 1900 – 7 May 1976) was a Dutch cyclist. He competed in two events at the 1924 Summer Olympics.

== See also ==
- List of Dutch Olympic cyclists
