= Jean-Pierre Kuhn =

Luxembourgish cyclist (1903–1984)

Personal information
- Born: 7 May 1903
- Died: 2 August 1984 (aged 81)

Cycling career
- Sport: Cycling

Jean-Pierre Kuhn (7 May 1903 – 2 August 1984) was a Luxembourgish cyclist. He competed in two events at the 1924 Summer Olympics.
