= John Boulicault =

American cyclist

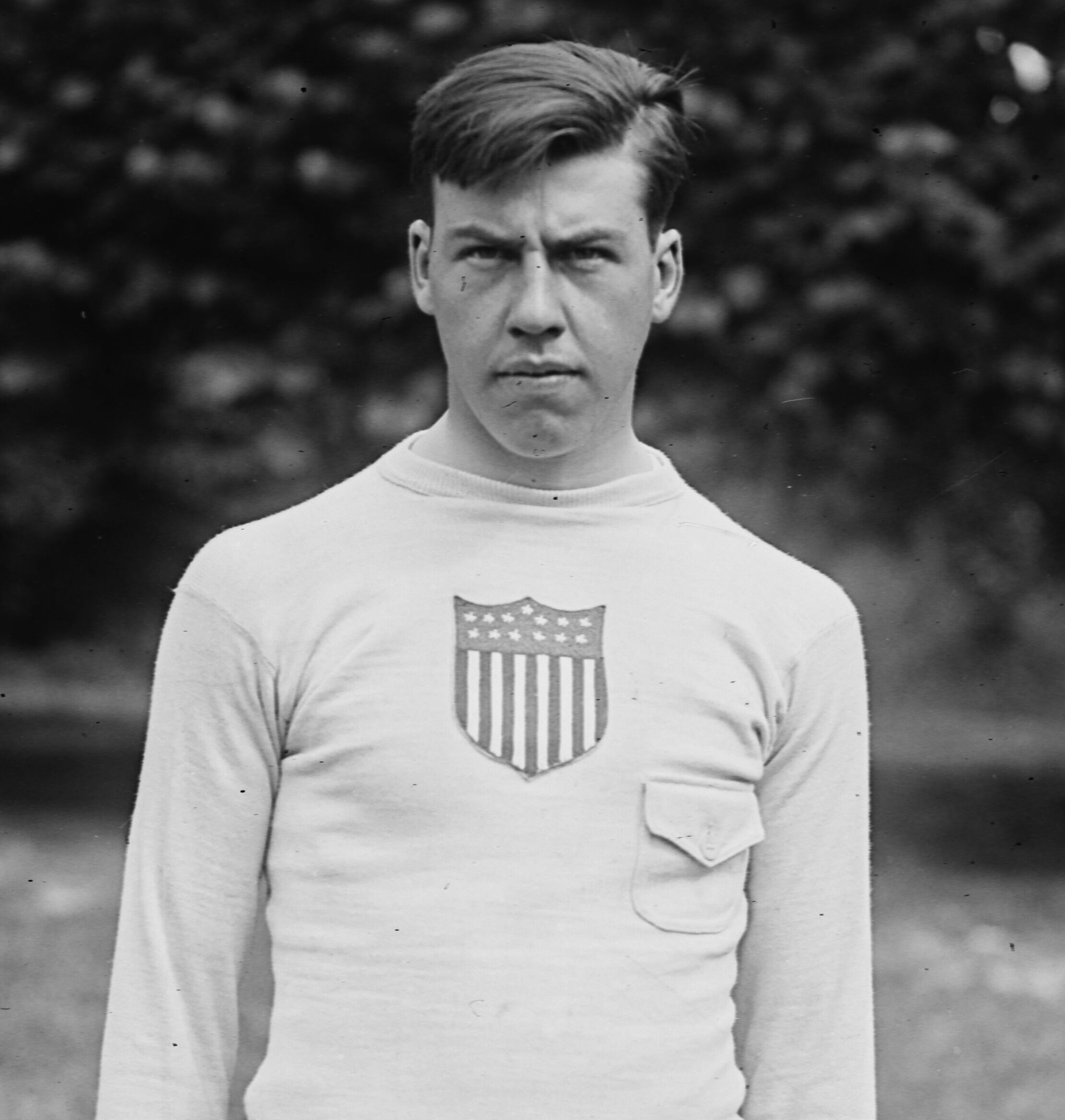
- John Boulicault in 1924

Personal information
- Born: July 27, 1906 St. Louis, Missouri, United States
- Died: July 11, 1985 (aged 78)

Cycling career
- Sport: Cycling

John Boulicault (June 27, 1906 – July 11, 1985) was an American cyclist. He competed in two events at the 1924 Summer Olympics.
