= Louis Pesch =

Luxembourgish cyclist

Personal information
- Born: 11 March 1904
- Died: 22 February 1959 (aged 54)

Cycling career
- Sport: Cycling

Louis Pesch (11 March 1904 – 22 February 1959) was a Luxembourgish cyclist. He competed in two events at the 1924 Summer Olympics.
