= Gustav Hentschel =

American cyclist

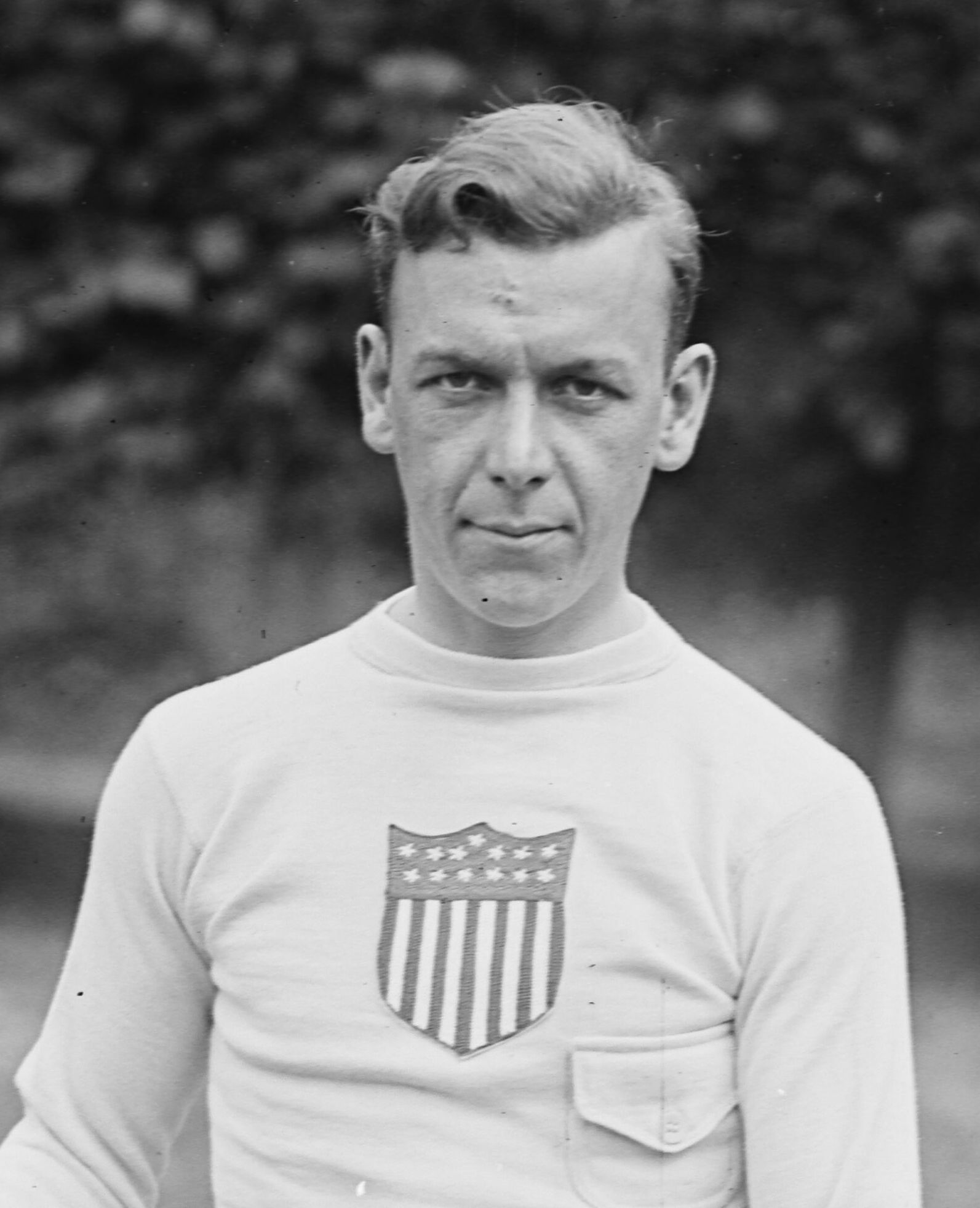
- Gustav Hentschel in 1924

Personal information
- Born: July 5, 1896 Chicago, Illinois, United States
- Died: June 7, 1980 (aged 83) Chicago, Illinois, United States

Cycling career
- Sport: Cycling

Gustav Hentschel (July 5, 1896 – June 7, 1980) was an American cyclist. He competed in two events at the 1924 Summer Olympics.
