= Erik Frank =

Finnish cyclist

Personal information
- Born: 12 November 1899 Tuusula, Finland
- Died: 5 January 1972 (aged 72) Helsinki, Finland

Cycling career
- Sport: Cycling

Erik Frank (12 November 1899 – 5 January 1972) was a Finnish cyclist. He competed in two events at the 1924 Summer Olympics.
