= Ivan Kosmatin =

Yugoslav cyclist

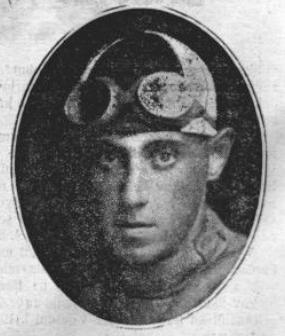
- Kosmatin in 1928

Personal information
- Born: 22 December 1897 Ljubljana, Austro-Hungarian Empire, modern day Slovenia
- Died: 11 September 1961 (aged 63)

Cycling career
- Sport: Cycling

Ivan Kosmatin (22 December 1897 – 11 September 1961) was a Yugoslav cyclist. He competed in two events at the 1924 Summer Olympics.
