= Antonín Charvát =

Czech cyclist

Personal information
- Born: 9 October 1899 Rakovník, Austria-Hungary
- Died: 19 September 1930 (aged 30)

Cycling career
- Sport: Cycling

Antonín Charvát (9 October 1899 – 19 September 1930) was a Czech cyclist. He competed for Czechoslovakia in two events at the 1924 Summer Olympics.
