= Bolesław Gościewicz =

Polish sports shooter

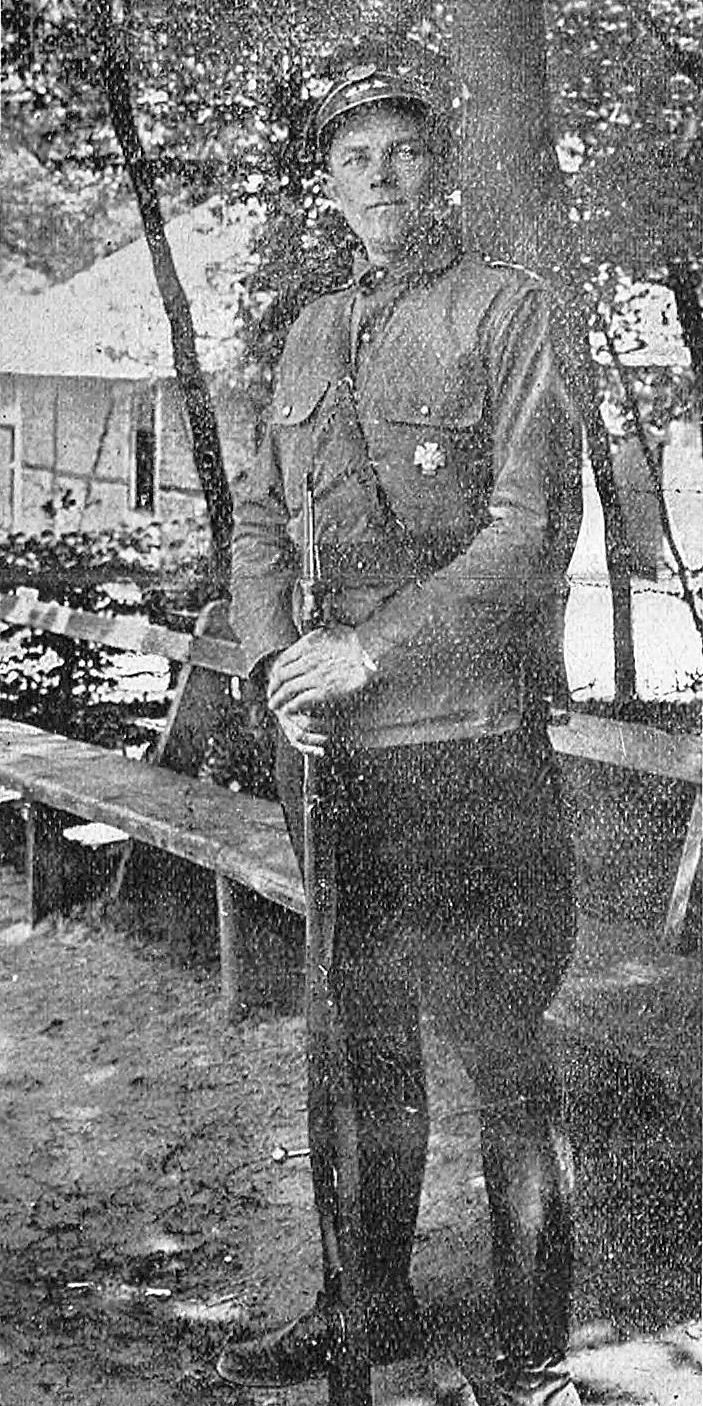

Personal information
- Born: 14 April 1890 Voškoniai, Russian Empire
- Died: 26 August 1973 (aged 83) Łódź, Poland

Sport
- Sport: Sports shooting

Bolesław Gościewicz (14 April 1890 – 26 August 1973) was a Polish sports shooter. He competed in two events at the 1924 Summer Olympics.
