= José Zampicchiatti =

Argentine cyclist

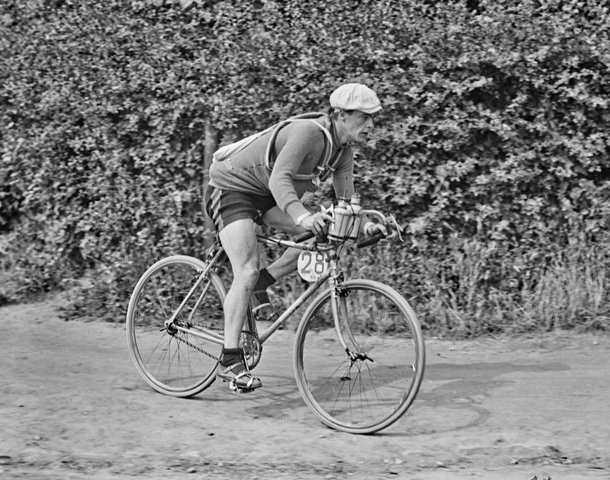
- Zampicchiatti at the 1924 Summer Olympics

Personal information
- Born: 11 October 1900 Olavarría, Argentina
- Died: 13 December 1984 (aged 84) Buenos Aires, Argentina

Cycling career
- Sport: Cycling

José Zampicchiatti (11 October 1900 – 13 December 1984) was an Argentine cyclist. He competed in two events at the 1924 Summer Olympics.
