= Samuel Hunter (cyclist) =

British cyclist

Personal information
- Born: 21 August 1894 Hatfield, Hertfordshire, England
- Died: 5 July 1976 (aged 81)

Cycling career
- Sport: Cycling

Amateur team
- Warren Cycling Club

Samuel George Ridley Hunter (21 August 1894 – 5 July 1976) was a British cyclist. He competed in two events at the 1924 Summer Olympics.
