= Marian Borzemski =

Polish sports shooter

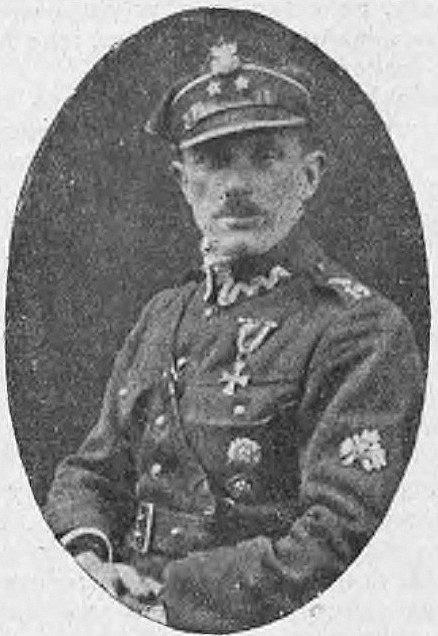

Personal information
- Born: 21 July 1894 Stanisławów, Austria-Hungary
- Died: 12 November 1959 (aged 65) Limanowa, Poland

Sport
- Sport: Sports shooting

Marian Borzemski (21 July 1894 – 12 November 1959) was a Polish sports shooter. He competed in three events at the 1924 Summer Olympics.
