= Ilmari Voudelin =

Finnish cyclist

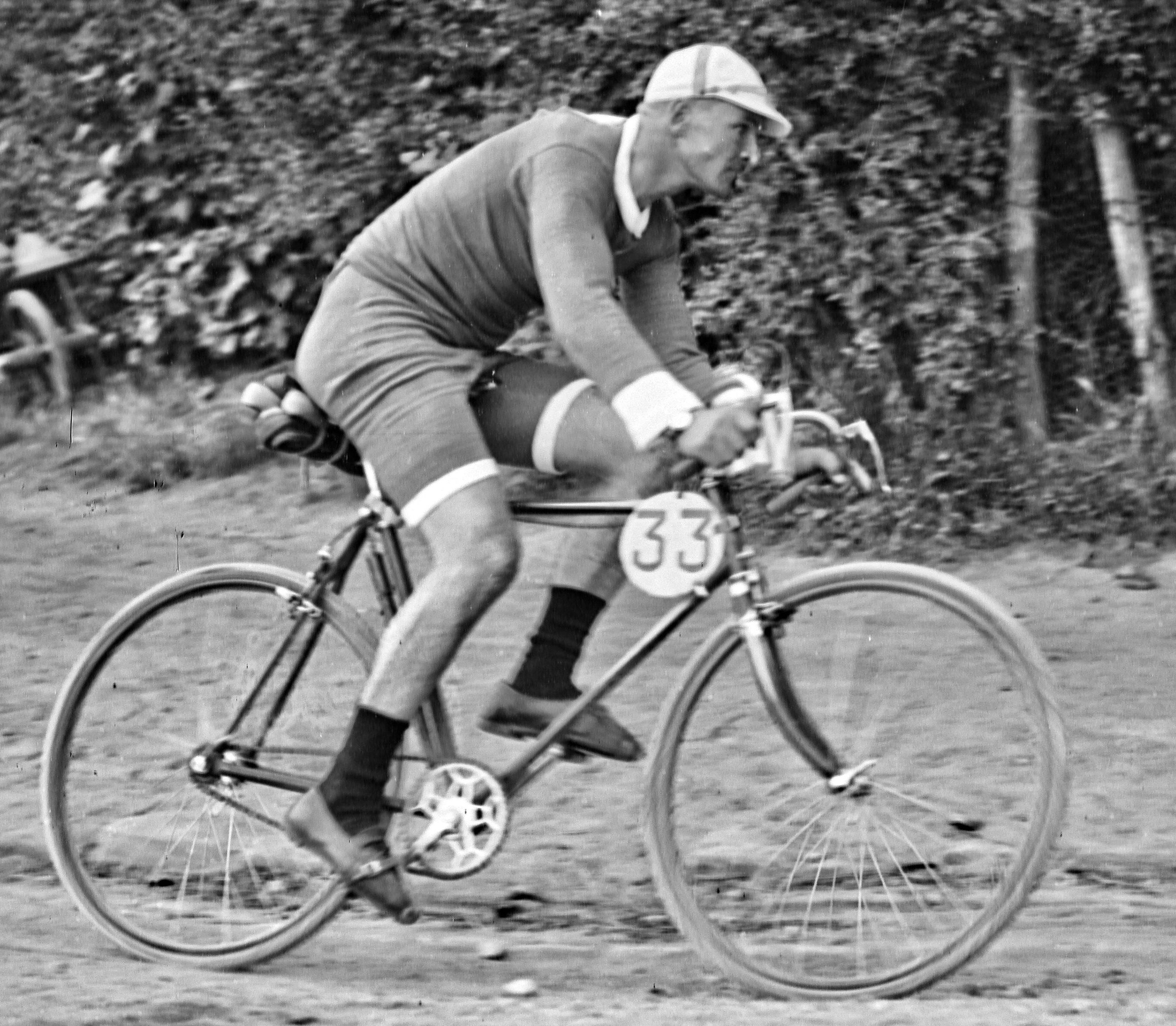
- Ilmari Voudelin in 1924

Personal information
- Born: 21 June 1896 Pukkila, Finland
- Died: 14 April 1946 (aged 49) Orimattila, Finland

Cycling career
- Sport: Cycling

Ilmari Voudelin (21 June 1896 – 14 April 1946) was a Finnish cyclist. He competed in two events at the 1924 Summer Olympics.
