= Martinus Vlietman =

Dutch cyclist

Personal information
- Born: 25 June 1900 Amsterdam, Netherlands
- Died: 4 February 1970 (aged 69) Amsterdam, Netherlands

Cycling career
- Sport: Cycling

Martinus Vlietman (25 June 1900 – 4 February 1970) was a Dutch cyclist. He competed in two events at the 1924 Summer Olympics.

== See also ==
- List of Dutch Olympic cyclists
