= Toivo Hörkkö =

Finnish cyclist

Personal information
- Born: 23 October 1898 Saint Petersburg, Russian Empire
- Died: 18 December 1975 (aged 77) Lappeenranta, Finland

Cycling career
- Sport: Cycling

Toivo Hörkkö (23 October 1898 – 18 December 1975) was a Finnish cyclist. He competed in two events at the 1924 Summer Olympics.
