= Georges Schiltz =

Luxembourgish cyclist

Personal information
- Born: 3 February 1901 Luxembourg City, Luxembourg

Cycling career
- Sport: Cycling

Georges Schiltz (born 3 February 1901, date of death unknown) was a Luxembourgish cyclist. He competed in two events at the 1924 Summer Olympics.
