= Feliks Kostrzębski =

Polish cyclist

Personal information
- Full name: Feliks Franciszek Kostrzębski
- Born: 10 May 1899 Lemberg, Austria-Hungary
- Died: 19 June 1954 (aged 55) Brzeg, Poland

Cycling career
- Sport: Cycling

Feliks Franciszek Kostrzębski (10 May 1899 – 19 June 1954) was a Polish cyclist. He competed in both the individual and team cycling races at the 1924 Summer Olympics. He finished 55th in the individual race and the Polish team finished 14th.
