= Milan Truban =

Yugoslav cyclist (1904–1929)

Personal information
- Born: 14 March 1904
- Died: 7 August 1929 (aged 25)

Cycling career
- Sport: Cycling

Milan Truban (14 March 1904 – 7 August 1929) was a Yugoslav cyclist. He competed in two events at the 1924 Summer Olympics.
