= Victor Hopkins (cyclist) =

American cyclist

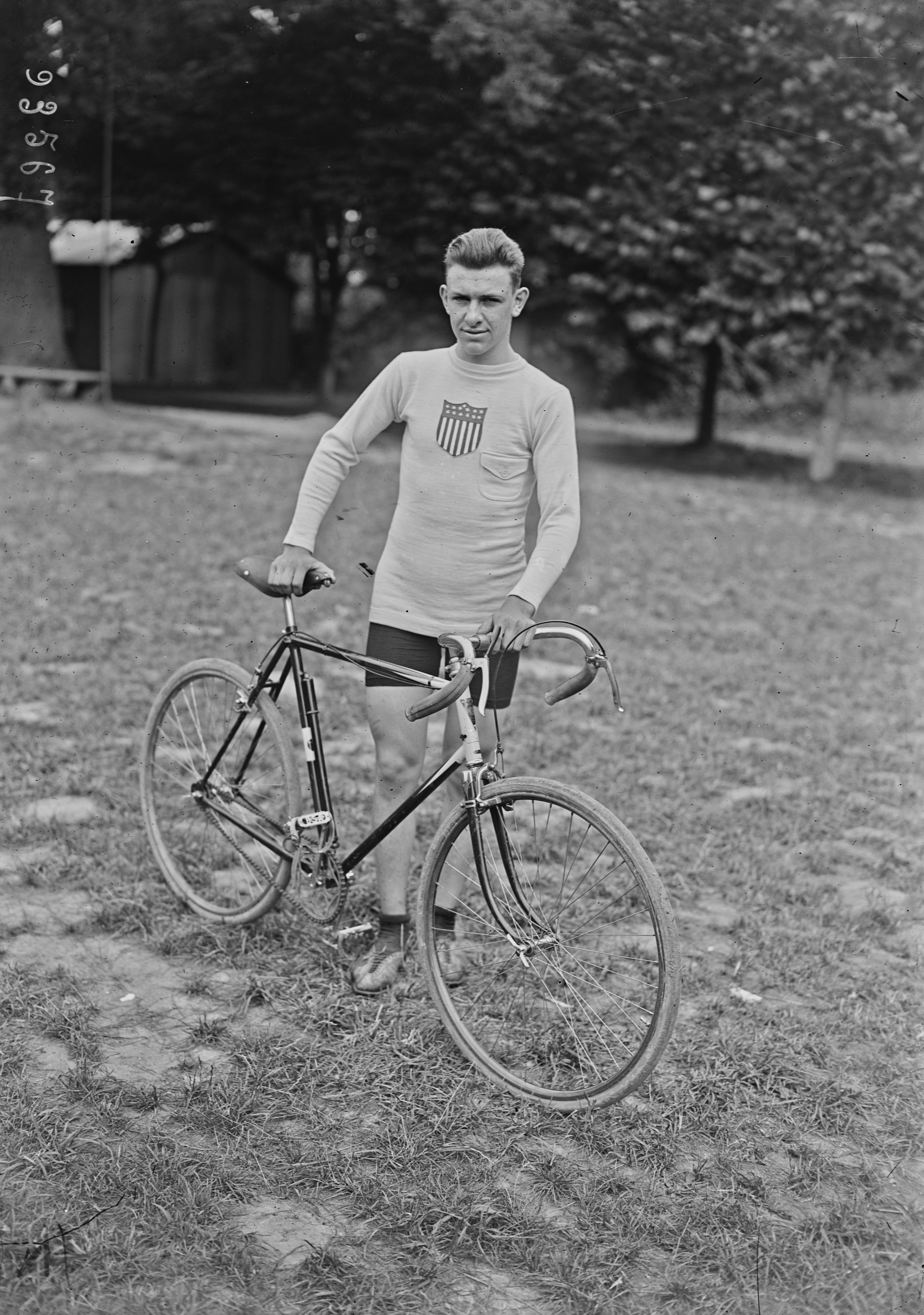
- Hopkins as an Olympic team member in 1924

Personal information
- Born: 19 July 1904 Cedar Rapids, Iowa, United States
- Died: 8 December 1969 (aged 65) Nutley, New Jersey, United States

Cycling career
- Sport: Cycling

Victor Hopkins (July 19, 1904 – December 8, 1969) was an American cyclist. He was raised at the Iowa Soldiers' Orphans' Home in Davenport, Iowa. He competed in two events at the 1924 Summer Olympics. He had qualified for the 1924 Olympics by finishing first in a race in Patterson, N.J. He also won the US Pro Championship in 1926.
