= Wiktor Hoechsmann =

Polish cyclist

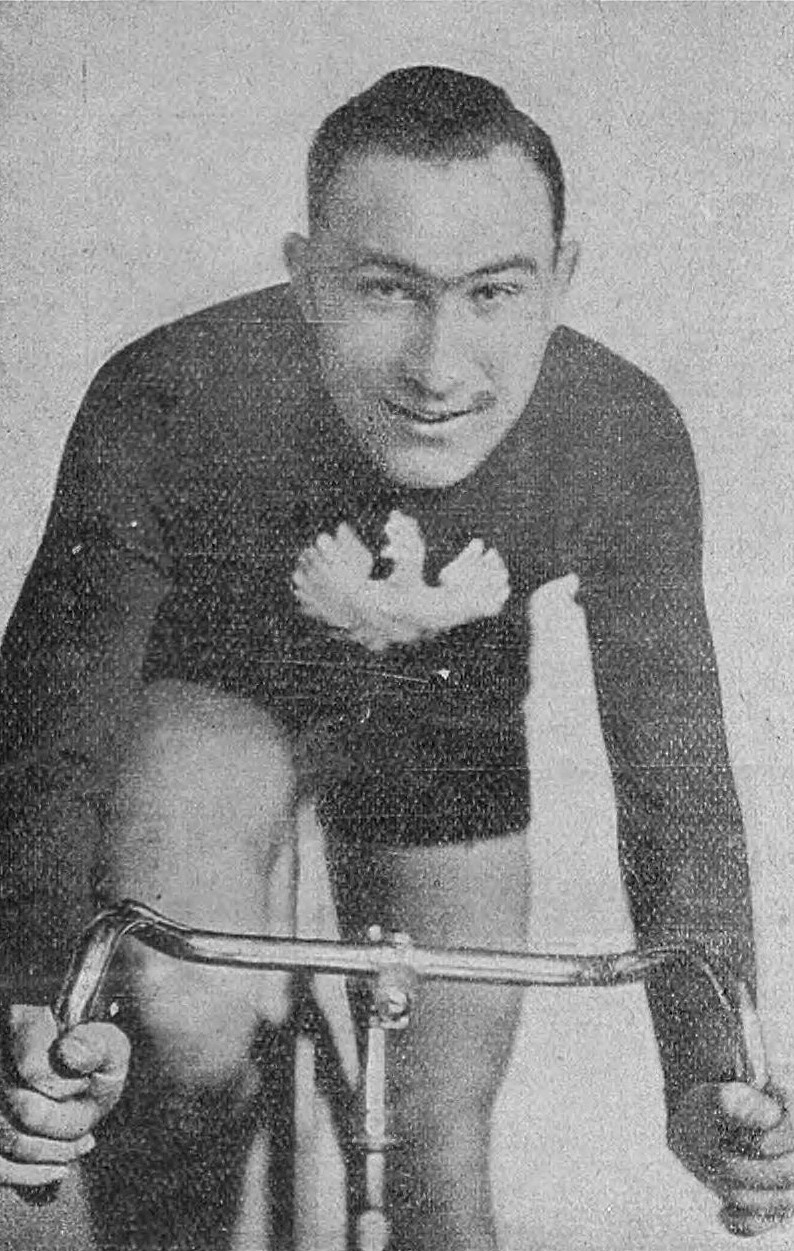

Personal information
- Born: 17 July 1894 Niepołomice, Poland
- Died: 29 June 1977 (aged 82) Kraków, Poland

Cycling career
- Sport: Cycling

Wiktor Hoechsmann (17 July 1894 – 29 June 1977) was a Polish cyclist. He competed in two events at the 1924 Summer Olympics.
