= Atanas Atanasov (cyclist) =

Bulgarian cyclist

Personal information
- Born: 1904

Cycling career
- Sport: Cycling

Atanas Atanasov (Bulgarian: Атанас Атанасов, born 1904, date of death unknown) was a Bulgarian cyclist. He competed in two events at the 1924 Summer Olympics.
