= Armand Blanchonnet =

French cyclist

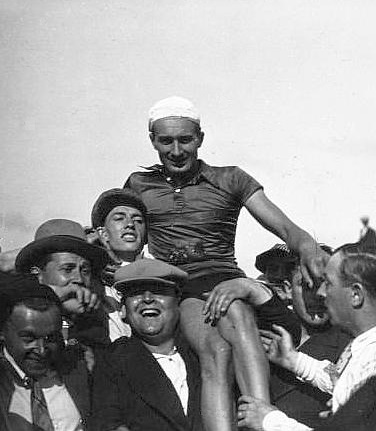
- Blanchonnet in 1931

Personal information
- Nickname: Le phénomène / King-Kong
- Born: 23 December 1903 Gipcy, Allier, France
- Died: 17 September 1968 (aged 64) Cernay-la-Ville, Yvelines, France
- Height: 182 cm (6 ft 0 in)
- Weight: 78 kg (172 lb)

Cycling career
- Sport: Cycling
Medal record
Men's road bicycle racing
Representing France
Olympic Games
Gold medal – first place	1924 Paris	Individual time trial
Gold medal – first place	1924 Paris	Team time trial
World Championships
Bronze medal – third place	1924 Paris	Amateur's road race

Armand Blanchonnet (French pronunciation: [aʁmɑ̃ blɑ̃ʃɔnɛ]; 23 December 1903 – 17 September 1968) was a French cyclist and Olympic Champion. He won the gold medal at the 1924 Olympic Games in Paris, in the Individual Time Trial. He also won the gold medal in the Team Road Race with the French winning team.
