= Mikhail Klaynerov =

Bulgarian cyclist

Personal information
- Born: 1 December 1904 Ruse, Bulgaria

Cycling career
- Sport: Cycling

Mikhail Klaynerov (Bulgarian: Михаил Клайнеров; born 1 December 1904, date of death unknown) was a Bulgarian cyclist. He competed in two road cycling events at the 1924 Summer Olympics.

== Career ==
Klaynerov's professional journey as a cyclist saw him competing in the 1924 Summer Olympics held in Paris. He participated in both the individual time trial and the team road race events. He finished 57th in the individual race, while his team did not finish the time trial.
