= Oswald Miller =

Polish cyclist

Personal information
- Born: 1892
- Died: Unknown

Cycling career
- Sport: Cycling

Oswald Miller (born 1892 — ?) was a Polish cyclist who represented the Union Sports Association in Łódź. He also competed in two events at the 1924 Summer Olympics.
