= Kazimierz Krzemiński =

Polish cyclist

Personal information
- Born: 25 February 1902 Lemberg, Austria-Hungary
- Died: 1940 (aged 37–38) Lwów, Poland

Cycling career
- Sport: Cycling

Kazimierz Krzemiński (25 February 1902 – 1940) was a Polish cyclist. He competed in two events at the 1924 Summer Olympics. He was murdered by the NKVD during World War II.
