= Georgi Abadzhiev (cyclist) =

Bulgarian cyclist

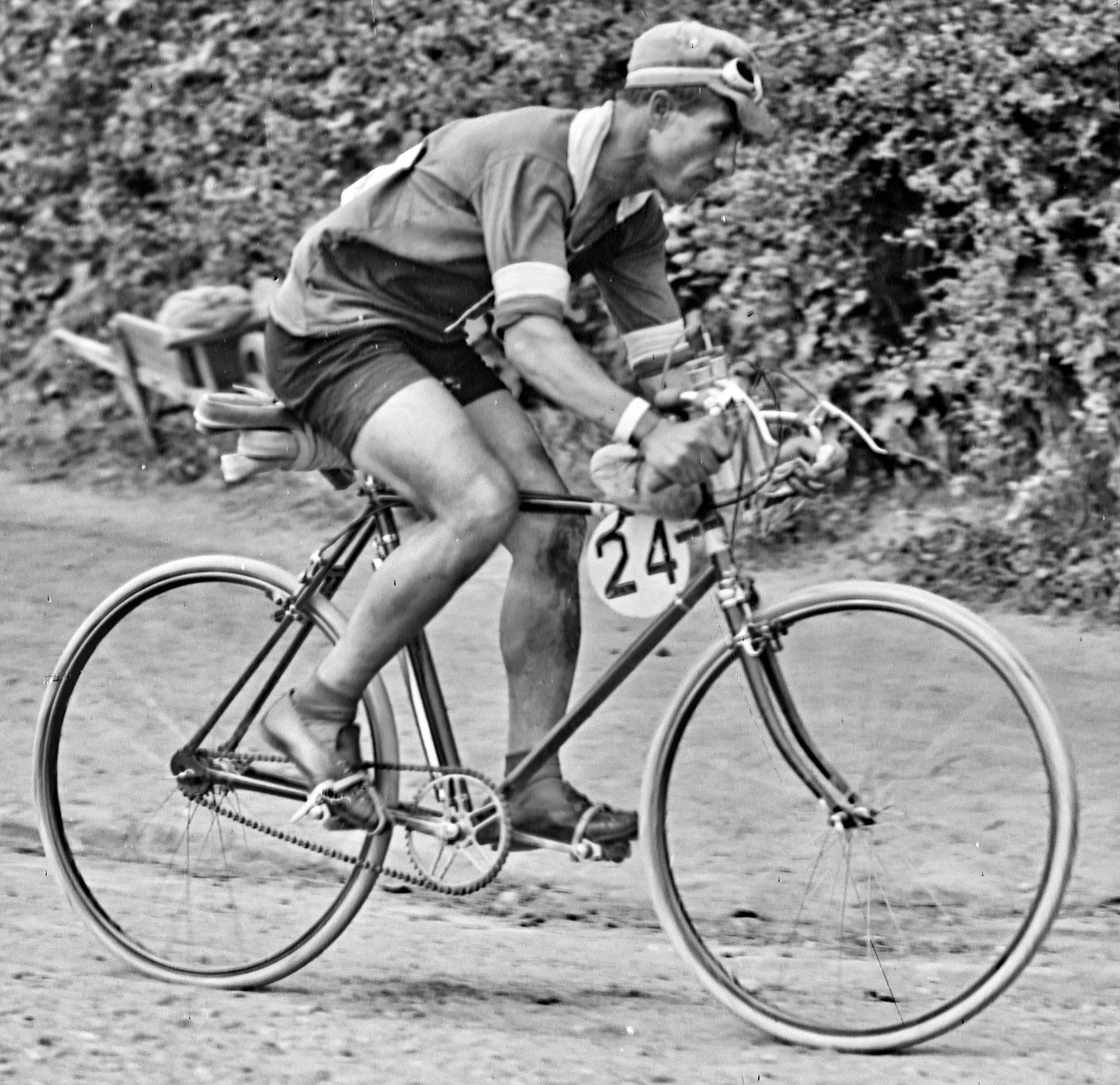
- Georgi Abadzhiev in 1924

Personal information
- Born: 21 October 1893 Razgrad, Bulgaria
- Died: 23 February 1972 (aged 78)

Cycling career
- Sport: Cycling

Georgi Abadzhiev (Bulgarian: Георги Абаджиев, 21 October 1893 – 23 February 1972) was a Bulgarian cyclist. He competed in two events at the 1924 Summer Olympics.

He was considered one of the "great names" of Bulgarian cycling and won the first Tour of Bulgaria in 1924.
