= Luigi Magnotti =

Italian cyclist

Personal information
- Born: 23 April 1895 Boffalora sopra Ticino, Italy
- Died: 8 July 1948 (aged 53) Milan, Italy

Cycling career
- Sport: Cycling

Luigi Magnotti (23 April 1895 – 8 July 1948) was an Italian cyclist. He competed in two events at the 1924 Summer Olympics.
