= Erik Bohlin =

Swedish cyclist

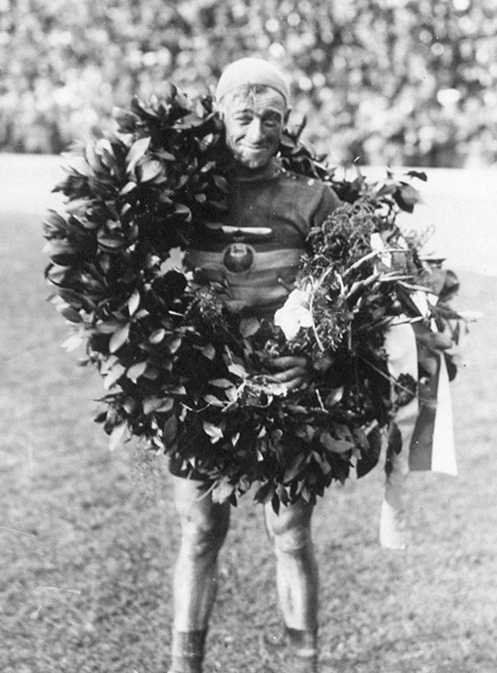

Personal information
- Born: 1 June 1897 Orsa, Sweden
- Died: 8 June 1977 (aged 80) Orsa, Sweden

Sport
- Sport: Cycling
- Event: Road
- Club: Upsala CK
Medal record
Representing Sweden
Olympic Games
| Bronze medal – third place | 1924 Paris | Team road race |

Erik Viktor "Orsa" Bohlin (1 June 1897 – 8 June 1977) was a Swedish road racing cyclist who competed in the 1924 Summer Olympics. He finished seventh in the individual road race and won a team bronze medal.

During his cycling career Bohlin won four national titles and two Swedish six-day races (in 1924 and 1926). He retired in 1927 after finishing fourth at the road world championships. He later changed to motorcycling and, with the engineer Gösta Rödén, created a 250 cc motorcycle that set a new Swedish speed record.
