= Ernie Pilcher =

British cyclist

Personal information
- Born: 1 August 1896 Faversham, England
- Died: 1980 (aged 83–84)

Cycling career
- Sport: Cycling

Amateur team
- Polytechnic C.C., Westminster

Ernest Clifford Pilcher (1 August 1896 – 1980) was a British cyclist. He competed in two events at the 1924 Summer Olympics.
