= Andy Wilson (cyclist) =

British cyclist

Personal information
- Born: 16 September 1902
- Died: 21 April 1926 (aged 23)

Cycling career
- Sport: Cycling

Amateur team
- Yorkshire RC

Andrew Wilson (16 September 1902 – 21 April 1926) was a British cyclist. He competed in two events at the 1924 Summer Olympics. Wilson died from pleurisy on 21 April 1926, aged 23. An annual memorial race was created and contested in his memory.
