= Gunnar Sköld =

Swedish cyclist

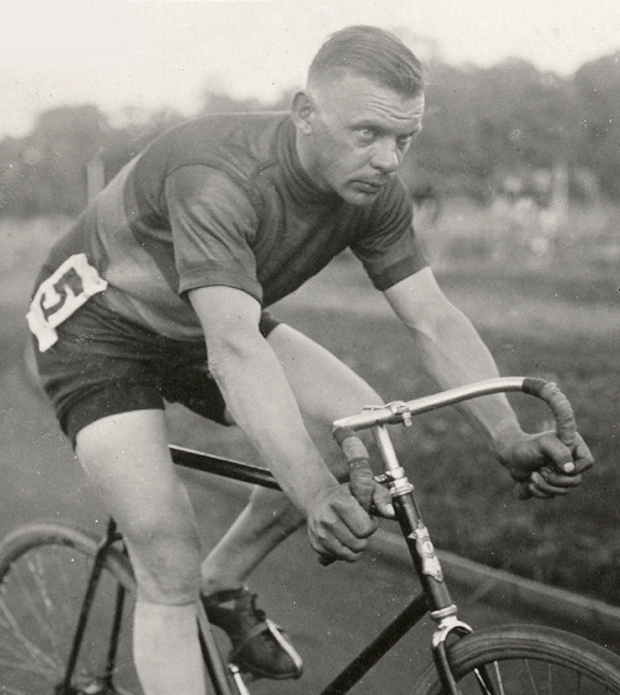

Personal information
- Born: 24 September 1894 Västerås, Sweden
- Died: 24 June 1971 (aged 76) Västerås, Sweden

Sport
- Sport: Cycling
- Event: Road
- Club: Upsala CK
Medal record
Representing Sweden
Olympic Games
Bronze medal – third place	1924 Paris	Team road race
World Championships
Gold medal – first place	1921 Copenhagen	Amateur road race

Alf Gunnar Sköld (24 September 1894 – 24 June 1971) was a Swedish road racing cyclist who competed in the 1924 Summer Olympics. He finished fourth in the individual road race and won a team bronze medal. At the inaugural amateur world championships in 1921 he won the road race and finished fourth in 1922 edition.

After retiring from competitions Sköld worked as treasurer and vice president of his native club Upsala CK and ran a sports shop.
