= Otto Lehner =

Swiss cyclist

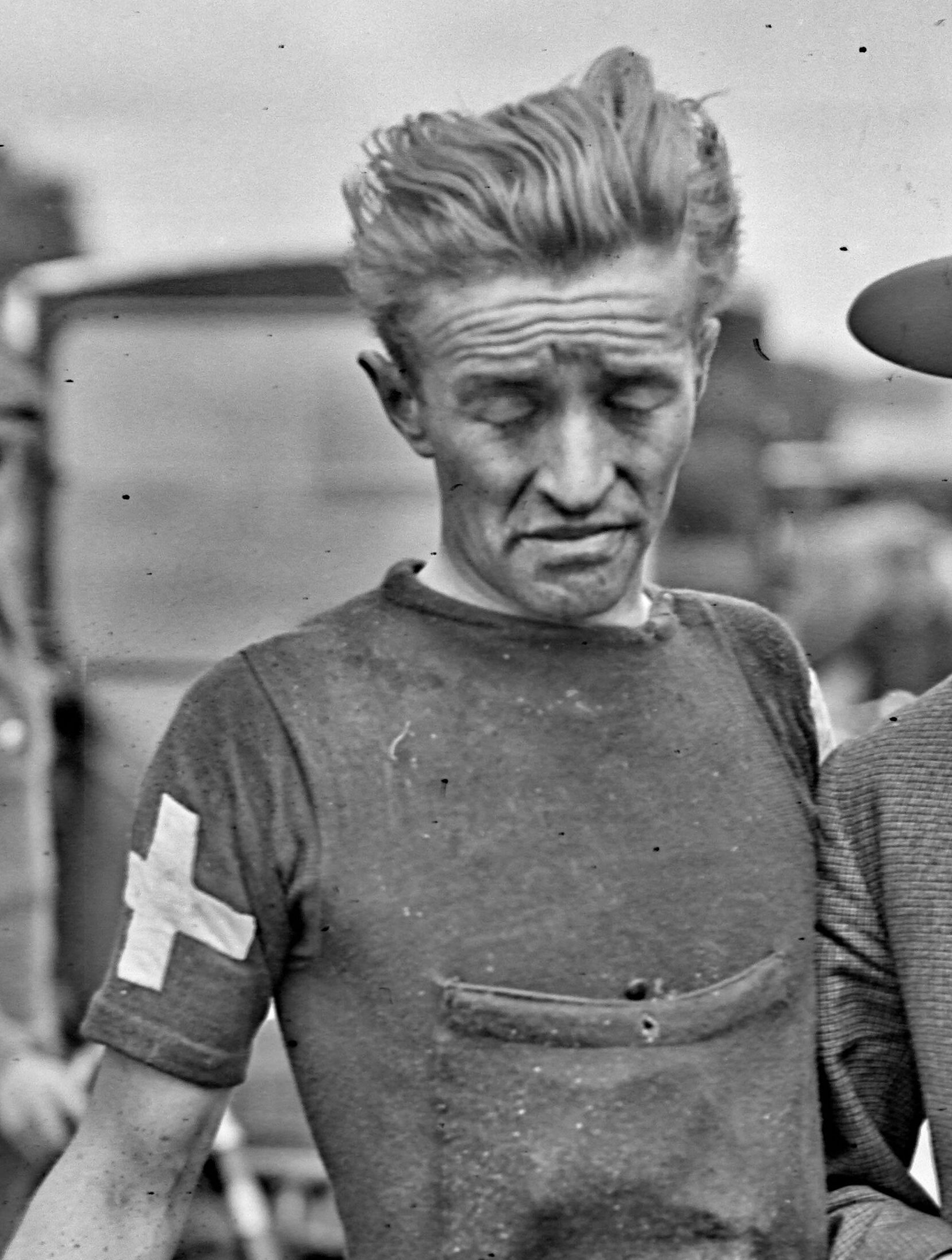
- Otto Lehner in 1924

Personal information
- Born: 20 August 1898 Gränichen, Switzerland
- Died: 1977 (aged 78–79)

Cycling career
- Sport: Cycling

Otto Lehner (20 August 1898 – 1977) was a Swiss cyclist. He competed in two events at the 1924 Summer Olympics.
