= List of Olympic medalists in cycling (men) =

This is the complete list of men's Olympic medalists in cycling.

== Current program ==
=== Road cycling ===
With three gold medals on the road, the most successful Olympic road cyclist is Viatcheslav Ekimov of Russia and the Soviet Union (Ekimov had a fourth gold on the track). Only one rider has won gold in both the road race and the road time trial at the same Olympic Games; Remco Evenepoel of Belgium in Paris 2024.

==== Road race, individual ====
The Olympic road race, one of the most iconic events at the Games, is also one with the most turnover in medals. No rider has ever won two gold medals, and only one rider has won two medals; Alexander Vinokourov of Kazakhstan, with a gold medal in London 2012, following a silver medal in Sydney 2000. Until 1992 and the Games in Barcelona, all riders were amateurs, with professionals not allowed to ride. Since 1992, the event has been dominated by the same professionals, with a list of famous winners. Unusually, the Games road race continues to be held without rider radios that are used at all times in the professional tours. This creates less predictable racing than the professional circuit.

Games	Gold	Silver	Bronze
1896 Athens	Aristidis Konstantinidis; Greece	August von Gödrich; Germany	Edward Battell; Great Britain
1900–1932	not included in the Olympic program		
1936 Berlin	Robert Charpentier; France	Guy Lapébie; France	Ernst Nievergelt; Switzerland
1948 London	José Beyaert; France	Gerrit Voorting; Netherlands	Lode Wouters; Belgium
1952 Helsinki	André Noyelle; Belgium	Robert Grondelaers; Belgium	Edi Ziegler; Germany
1956 Melbourne	Ercole Baldini; Italy	Arnaud Geyre; France	Alan Jackson; Great Britain
1960 Rome	Viktor Kapitonov; Soviet Union	Livio Trapè; Italy	Willy van den Berghen; Belgium
1964 Tokyo	Mario Zanin; Italy	Kjell Rodian; Denmark	Walter Godefroot; Belgium
1968 Mexico City	Pierfranco Vianelli; Italy	Leif Mortensen; Denmark	Gösta Pettersson; Sweden
1972 Munich	Hennie Kuiper; Netherlands	Clyde Sefton; Australia	None awarded
1976 Montreal	Bernt Johansson; Sweden	Giuseppe Martinelli; Italy	Mieczysław Nowicki; Poland
1980 Moscow	Sergei Sukhoruchenkov; Soviet Union	Czesław Lang; Poland	Yuri Barinov; Soviet Union
1984 Los Angeles	Alexi Grewal; United States	Steve Bauer; Canada	Dag Otto Lauritzen; Norway
1988 Seoul	Olaf Ludwig; East Germany	Bernd Gröne; West Germany	Christian Henn; West Germany
1992 Barcelona	Fabio Casartelli; Italy	Erik Dekker; Netherlands	Dainis Ozols; Latvia
1996 Atlanta	Pascal Richard; Switzerland	Rolf Sørensen; Denmark	Max Sciandri; Great Britain
2000 Sydney	Jan Ullrich; Germany	Alexander Vinokourov; Kazakhstan	Andreas Klöden; Germany
2004 Athens	Paolo Bettini; Italy	Sérgio Paulinho; Portugal	Axel Merckx; Belgium
2008 Beijing	Samuel Sánchez; Spain	Fabian Cancellara; Switzerland	Alexandr Kolobnev; Russia
2012 London	Alexander Vinokourov; Kazakhstan	Rigoberto Urán; Colombia	Alexander Kristoff; Norway
2016 Rio de Janeiro	Greg Van Avermaet; Belgium	Jakob Fuglsang; Denmark	Rafał Majka; Poland
2020 Tokyo	Richard Carapaz; Ecuador	Wout Van Aert; Belgium	Tadej Pogačar; Slovenia
2024 Paris	Remco Evenepoel; Belgium	Valentin Madouas; France	Christophe Laporte; France
2028 Los Angeles			

==== Time trial, individual ====
Two riders have won a pair of gold medals in the time trial. Viatcheslav Ekimov, representing Russia and Fabian Cancellara for Switzerland. Tom Dumoulin of the Netherlands, and Chris Froome of Great Britain have also won two medals each, though neither of them gold. Bradley Wiggins in 2012, is the only rider to win time trial gold, or any Olympic road racing gold, in the same year - and in this case the same month - as winning the maillot jeune of the Tour de France.

Games	Gold	Silver	Bronze
1912 Stockholm	Rudolph Lewis; South Africa	Frederick Grubb; Great Britain	Carl Schutte; United States
1920 Antwerp	Harry Stenqvist; Sweden	Henry Kaltenbrunn; South Africa	Fernand Canteloube; France
1924 Paris	Armand Blanchonnet; France	Henri Hoevenaers; Belgium	René Hamel; France
1928 Amsterdam	Henry Hansen; Denmark	Frank Southall; Great Britain	Gösta Carlsson; Sweden
1932 Los Angeles	Attilio Pavesi; Italy	Guglielmo Segato; Italy	Bernhard Britz; Sweden
1936–1992	not included in the Olympic program		
1996 Atlanta	Miguel Induráin; Spain	Abraham Olano; Spain	Chris Boardman; Great Britain
2000 Sydney	Viatcheslav Ekimov; Russia	Jan Ullrich; Germany	None awarded
2004 Athens	Viatcheslav Ekimov; Russia	Bobby Julich; United States	Michael Rogers; Australia
2008 Beijing	Fabian Cancellara; Switzerland	Gustav Larsson; Sweden	Levi Leipheimer; United States
2012 London	Bradley Wiggins; Great Britain	Tony Martin; Germany	Chris Froome; Great Britain
2016 Rio de Janeiro	Fabian Cancellara; Switzerland	Tom Dumoulin; Netherlands	Chris Froome; Great Britain
2020 Tokyo	Primož Roglič; Slovenia	Tom Dumoulin; Netherlands	Rohan Dennis; Australia
2024 Paris	Remco Evenepoel; Belgium	Filippo Ganna; Italy	Wout van Aert; Belgium
2028 Los Angeles			

=== Track cycling ===
==== Keirin ====
Games	Gold	Silver	Bronze
2000 Sydney	Florian Rousseau; France	Gary Neiwand; Australia	Jens Fiedler; Germany
2004 Athens	Ryan Bayley; Australia	José Antonio Escuredo; Spain	Shane Kelly; Australia
2008 Beijing	Chris Hoy; Great Britain	Ross Edgar; Great Britain	Kiyofumi Nagai; Japan
2012 London	Chris Hoy; Great Britain	Maximilian Levy; Germany	Simon van Velthooven; New Zealand
2012 London	Chris Hoy; Great Britain	Maximilian Levy; Germany	Teun Mulder; Netherlands
2016 Rio de Janeiro	Jason Kenny; Great Britain	Matthijs Büchli; Netherlands	Azizulhasni Awang; Malaysia
2020 Tokyo	Jason Kenny; Great Britain	Azizulhasni Awang; Malaysia	Harrie Lavreysen; Netherlands
2024 Paris	Harrie Lavreysen; Netherlands	Matthew Richardson; Australia	Matthew Glaetzer; Australia
2028 Los Angeles			

==== Madison ====
Games	Gold	Silver	Bronze
2000 Sydney	Brett Aitken and Scott McGrory; Australia	Etienne De Wilde and Matthew Gilmore; Belgium	Silvio Martinello and Marco Villa; Italy
2004 Athens	Graeme Brown and Stuart O'Grady; Australia	Franco Marvulli and Bruno Risi; Switzerland	Rob Hayles and Bradley Wiggins; Great Britain
2008 Beijing	Juan Curuchet and Walter Pérez; Argentina	Joan Llaneras and Antonio Tauler; Spain	Mikhail Ignatiev and Alexei Markov; Russia
2012–2016	not included in the Olympic program		
2020 Tokyo	Lasse Norman Hansen and Michael Mørkøv; Denmark	Ethan Hayter and Matthew Walls; Great Britain	Donavan Grondin and Benjamin Thomas; France
2024 Paris	Iúri Leitão and Rui Oliveira; Portugal	Simone Consonni and Elia Viviani; Italy	Niklas Larsen and Michael Mørkøv; Denmark
2028 Los Angeles			

==== Omnium ====
Games	Gold	Silver	Bronze
2012 London	Lasse Norman Hansen; Denmark	Bryan Coquard; France	Ed Clancy; Great Britain
2016 Rio de Janeiro	Elia Viviani; Italy	Mark Cavendish; Great Britain	Lasse Norman Hansen; Denmark
2020 Tokyo	Matthew Walls; Great Britain	Campbell Stewart; New Zealand	Elia Viviani; Italy
2024 Paris	Benjamin Thomas; France	Iúri Leitão; Portugal	Fabio Van den Bossche; Belgium
2028 Los Angeles			

==== Pursuit, team ====
Games	Gold	Silver	Bronze
1908 London	Great Britain; Benjamin Jones; Clarence Kingsbury; Leonard Meredith; Ernest Payne	Germany; Max Götze; Rudolf Katzer; Hermann Martens; Karl Neumer	Canada; William Anderson; Walter Andrews; Frederick McCarthy; William Morton
1912 Stockholm	not included in the Olympic program		
1920 Antwerp	Italy; Arnaldo Carli; Ruggero Ferrario; Franco Giorgetti; Primo Magnani	Great Britain; Cyril Alden; Horace Johnson; William Stewart; Albert White	South Africa; Harry Goosen; Henry Kaltenbrun; William Smith; James Walker
1924 Paris	Italy; Angelo de Martino; Alfredo Dinale; Aurelio Menegazzi; Francesco Zucchetti	Poland; Józef Lange; Jan Lazarski; Tomasz Stankiewicz; Franciszek Szymczyk	Belgium; Jean Van Den Bosch; Léonard Daghelinckx; Henri Hoevenaers; Ferdinand Saive
1928 Amsterdam	Italy; Giacomo Gaioni; Cesare Facciani; Mario Lusiani; Luigi Tasselli	Netherlands; Janus Braspennincx; Piet van der Horst; Johannes Maas; Jan Pijnenburg	Great Britain; George Southall; Harry Wyld; Leonard Wyld; Percy Wyld
1932 Los Angeles	Italy; Nino Borsari; Marco Cimatti; Alberto Ghilardi; Paolo Pedretti	France; Paul Chocque; Amédée Fournier; René Legrèves; Henri Mouillefarine	Great Britain; William Harvell; Charles Holland; Ernest Johnson; Frank Southall
1936 Berlin	France; Robert Charpentier; Jean Goujon; Guy Lapébie; Roger-Jean Le Nizerhy	Italy; Bianco Bianchi; Mario Gentili; Armando Latini; Severino Rigoni	Great Britain; Harry Hill; Ernest Johnson; Charles King; Ernest Mills
1948 London	France; Pierre Adam; Serge Blusson; Charles Coste; Fernand Decanali	Italy; Arnaldo Benfenati; Guido Bernardi; Anselmo Citterio; Rino Pucci	Great Britain; Robert Geldard; Tommy Godwin; David Ricketts; Wilfred Waters
1952 Helsinki	Italy; Loris Campana; Mino De Rossi; Guido Messina; Marino Morettini	South Africa; George Estman; Robert Fowler; Thomas Shardelow; Alfred Swift	Great Britain; Donald Burgess; George Newberry; Alan Newton; Ronald Stretton
1956 Melbourne	Italy; Antonio Domenicali; Leandro Faggin; Franco Gandini; Valentino Gasparella; Virginio Pizzali	France; René Bianchi; Jean Graczyk; Jean-Claude Lecante; Michel Vermeulin	Great Britain; Donald Burgess; Michael Gambrill; John Geddes; Tom Simpson
1960 Rome	Italy; Luigi Arienti; Franco Testa; Mario Vallotto; Marino Vigna	United Team of Germany; Bernd Barleben; Peter Gröning; Manfred Klieme; Siegfried Köhler	Soviet Union; Arnold Belgardt; Leonid Kolumbet; Stanislav Moskvin; Viktor Romanov
1964 Tokyo	United Team of Germany; Lothar Claesges; Karl-Heinz Henrichs; Karl Link; Ernst Streng	Italy; Vincenzo Mantovani; Carlo Rancati; Luigi Roncaglia; Franco Testa	Netherlands; Henk Cornelisse; Gerard Koel; Jaap Oudkerk; Cor Schuuring
1968 Mexico City	Denmark; Gunnar Asmussen; Mogens Jensen; Per Lyngemark; Reno Olsen	West Germany; Udo Hempel; Karl-Heinz Henrichs; Jürgen Kissner; Karl Link	Italy; Lorenzo Bosisio; Cipriano Chemello; Giorgio Morbiato; Luigi Roncaglia
1972 Munich	West Germany; Günther Schumacher; Jürgen Colombo; Günter Haritz; Udo Hempel	East Germany; Uwe Unterwalder; Thomas Huschke; Heinz Richter; Herbert Richter	Great Britain; William Moore; Michael Bennett; Ian Hallam; Ronald Keeble
1976 Montreal	West Germany; Peter Vonhof; Gregor Braun; Hans Lutz; Günther Schumacher	Soviet Union; Viktor Sokolov; Vladimir Osokin; Aleksandr Perov; Vitaly Petrakov	Great Britain; Ian Hallam; Ian Banbury; Michael Bennett; Robin Croker
1980 Moscow	Soviet Union; Viktor Manakov; Valery Movchan; Vladimir Osokin; Vitaly Petrakov; Aleksandr Krasnov	East Germany; Gerald Mortag; Uwe Unterwalder; Matthias Wiegand; Volker Winkler	Czechoslovakia; Teodor Černý; Martin Penc; Jiří Pokorný lgor Sláma
1984 Los Angeles	Australia; Michael Grenda; Kevin Nichols; Michael Turtur; Dean Woods	United States; David Grylls; Steve Hegg; Patrick McDonough; Leonard Nitz	West Germany; Reinhard Alber; Rolf Gölz; Roland Günther; Michael Marx
1988 Seoul	Soviet Union; Viatcheslav Ekimov; Artūras Kasputis; Dmitry Nelyubin; Gintautas Umaras	East Germany; Carsten Wolf; Steffen Blochwitz; Roland Hennig; Dirk Meier	Australia; Scott McGrory; Dean Woods; Brett Dutton; Wayne McCarny; Stephen McGlede
1992 Barcelona	Germany; Stefan Steinweg; Andreas Walzer; Guido Fulst; Michael Glöckner; Jens Lehmann	Australia; Stuart O'Grady; Brett Aitken; Stephen McGlede; Shaun O'Brien	Denmark; Jan Petersen; Michael Sandstød; Ken Frost; Jimmi Madsen; Klaus Kynde Nielsen
1996 Atlanta	France; Christophe Capelle; Philippe Ermenault; Jean-Michel Monin; Francis Moreau	Russia; Eduard Gritsun; Nikolay Kuznetsov; Alexei Markov; Anton Shantyr	Australia; Brett Aitken; Stuart O'Grady; Timothy O'Shannessey; Dean Woods
2000 Sydney	Germany; Guido Fulst; Robert Bartko; Daniel Becke; Jens Lehmann	Ukraine; Sergiy Chernyavsky; Sergiy Matveyev; Alexander Symonenko; Oleksandr Fedenko	Great Britain; Paul Manning; Chris Newton; Bryan Steel; Bradley Wiggins
2004 Athens	Australia; Graeme Brown; Brett Lancaster; Bradley McGee; Luke Roberts	Great Britain; Steve Cummings; Rob Hayles; Paul Manning; Bradley Wiggins	Spain; Carlos Castaño; Sergi Escobar; Asier Maeztu; Carlos Torrent
2008 Beijing	Great Britain; Ed Clancy; Paul Manning; Geraint Thomas; Bradley Wiggins	Denmark; Casper Jørgensen; Jens-Erik Madsen; Michael Mørkøv; Alex Nicki Rasmussen; Michael Færk Christensen	New Zealand; Sam Bewley; Hayden Roulston; Marc Ryan; Jesse Sergent; Westley Gough
2012 London	Great Britain; Ed Clancy; Geraint Thomas; Steven Burke; Peter Kennaugh	Australia; Jack Bobridge; Glenn O'Shea; Rohan Dennis; Michael Hepburn	New Zealand; Sam Bewley; Aaron Gate; Marc Ryan; Jesse Sergent; Westley Gough
2016 Rio de Janeiro	Great Britain; Ed Clancy; Steven Burke; Owain Doull; Bradley Wiggins	Australia; Alexander Edmondson; Jack Bobridge; Michael Hepburn; Sam Welsford	Denmark; Lasse Norman Hansen; Niklas Larsen; Frederik Madsen; Casper von Folsach
2020 Tokyo	Italy; Simone Consonni; Filippo Ganna; Francesco Lamon; Jonathan Milan	Denmark; Lasse Norman Hansen; Niklas Larsen; Frederik Rodenberg; Rasmus Pedersen	Australia; Kelland O'Brien; Sam Welsford; Leigh Howard; Luke Plapp
2024 Paris	Australia; Oliver Bleddyn; Sam Welsford; Conor Leahy; Kelland O'Brien	Great Britain; Ethan Hayter; Daniel Bigham; Charlie Tanfield; Ethan Vernon	Italy; Simone Consonni; Filippo Ganna; Francesco Lamon; Jonathan Milan
2028 Los Angeles			

==== Sprint, individual ====
Games	Gold	Silver	Bronze
1896 Athens	Paul Masson; France	Stamatios Nikolopoulos; Greece	Léon Flameng; France
1900 Paris	Albert Taillandier; France	Fernand Sanz; France	John Henry Lake; United States
1904 St. Louis	not included in the Olympic program		
1908 London	No medalists: final declared void as time limit was exceeded		
1912 Stockholm	not included in the Olympic program		
1920 Antwerp	Maurice Peeters; Netherlands	Horace Johnson; Great Britain	Harry Ryan; Great Britain
1924 Paris	Lucien Michard; France	Jacob Meijer; Netherlands	Jean Cugnot; France
1928 Amsterdam	Roger Beaufrand; France	Antoine Mazairac; Netherlands	Willy Hansen; Denmark
1932 Los Angeles	Jacobus van Egmond; Netherlands	Louis Chaillot; France	Bruno Pellizzari; Italy
1936 Berlin	Toni Merkens; Germany	Arie van Vliet; Netherlands	Louis Chaillot; France
1948 London	Mario Ghella; Italy	Reg Harris; Great Britain	Axel Schandorff; Denmark
1952 Helsinki	Enzo Sacchi; Italy	Lionel Cox; Australia	Werner Potzernheim; Germany
1956 Melbourne	Michel Rousseau; France	Guglielmo Presenti; Italy	Dick Ploog; Australia
1960 Rome	Sante Gaiardoni; Italy	Leo Sterckx; Belgium	Valentino Gasarella; Italy
1964 Tokyo	Giovanni Pettenella; Italy	Sergio Bianchetto; Italy	Daniel Morelon; France
1968 Mexico City	Daniel Morelon; France	Giordano Turrini; Italy	Pierre Trentin; France
1972 Munich	Daniel Morelon; France	John Nicholson; Australia	Omar Pkhakadze; Soviet Union
1976 Montreal	Anton Tkáč; Czechoslovakia	Daniel Morelon; France	Hens-Jurgen Geschke; East Germany
1980 Moscow	Lutz Heßlich; East Germany	Yave Cahard; France	Sergei Kopylov; Soviet Union
1984 Los Angeles	Mark Gorski; United States	Nelson Vails; United States	Tsutomu Sakamoto; Japan
1988 Seoul	Lutz Heßlich; East Germany	Nikolai Kovsh; Soviet Union	Gary Neiwand; Australia
1992 Barcelona	Jens Fiedler; Germany	Gary Neiwand; Australia	Curt Harnett; Canada
1996 Atlanta	Jens Fiedler; Germany	Marty Nothstein; United States	Curt Harnett; Canada
2000 Sydney	Marty Nothstein; United States	Florian Rousseau; France	Jens Fiedler; Germany
2004 Athens	Ryan Bayley; Australia	Theo Bos; Netherlands	René Wolff; Germany
2008 Beijing	Chris Hoy; Great Britain	Jason Kenny; Great Britain	Mickaël Bourgain; France
2012 London	Jason Kenny; Great Britain	Grégory Baugé; France	Shane Perkins; Australia
2016 Rio de Janeiro	Jason Kenny; Great Britain	Callum Skinner; Great Britain	Denis Dmitriev; Russia
2020 Tokyo	Harrie Lavreysen; Netherlands	Jeffrey Hoogland; Netherlands	Jack Carlin; Great Britain
2024 Paris	Harrie Lavreysen; Netherlands	Matthew Richardson; Australia	Jack Carlin; Great Britain
2028 Los Angeles			

==== Sprint, team ====
Introduced in the 2000 Summer Olympics in Sydney, Australia, the team sprint is effectively a 750-metre team time trial, with a rider peeling off at the end of each lap. since its introduction, the event has been dominated by Great Britain, with three wins from the six occasions on which the event was held, and two silver medals. Jason Kenny holds the record of three gold and one silver medal in the event, having been a part of the winning team on three consecutive occasions between 2008 and 2016. France, the first winners of the event in Sydney, were the only nation to have won a medal in every edition, with 1 gold, 2 silvers and 3 bronze medals, but failed to maintain that record, ironically, in their home Games of 2024.

Netherlands hold the Olympic and World record in the event, set in the team sprint final at the Paris Olympic Games of 2024. They also hold the distinction of being the only team to win the event twice with the same three riders: Roy van den Berg, Harrie Lavreysen and Jeffrey Hoogland. Great Britain's three triumphs came with three different teams of which Jason Kenny was the only ever-present.

Games	Gold	Silver	Bronze
2000 Sydney	France; Florian Rousseau; Arnaud Tournant; Laurent Gané	Great Britain; Chris Hoy; Craig MacLean; Jason Queally	Australia; Gary Neiwand; Sean Eadie; Darryn Hill
2004 Athens	Germany; Jens Fiedler; Stefan Nimke; René Wolff	Japan; Toshiaki Fushimi; Masaki Inoue; Tomohiro Nagatsuka	France; Mickaël Bourgain; Laurent Gané; Arnaud Tournant
2008 Beijing	Great Britain; Chris Hoy; Jason Kenny; Jamie Staff	France; Grégory Baugé; Kévin Sireau; Arnaud Tournant	Germany; René Enders; Maximilian Levy; Stefan Nimke
2012 London	Great Britain; Chris Hoy; Jason Kenny; Philip Hindes	France; Grégory Baugé; Kévin Sireau; Michaël D'Almeida	Germany; René Enders; Maximilian Levy; Robert Förstemann
2016 Rio de Janeiro	Great Britain; Philip Hindes; Jason Kenny; Callum Skinner	New Zealand; Eddie Dawkins; Ethan Mitchell; Sam Webster	France; Grégory Baugé; Michaël D'Almeida; François Pervis
2020 Tokyo	Netherlands; Jeffrey Hoogland; Harrie Lavreysen; Roy van den Berg	Great Britain; Jack Carlin; Jason Kenny; Ryan Owens	France; Florian Grengbo; Rayan Helal; Sébastien Vigier
2024 Paris	Netherlands; Jeffrey Hoogland; Harrie Lavreysen; Roy van den Berg	Great Britain; Ed Lowe; Hamish Turnbull; Jack Carlin	Australia; Leigh Hoffman; Matthew Richardson; Matthew Glaetzer
2028 Los Angeles			

=== Mountain bike ===
==== Cross-country ====
Two riders have won two gold medals in the cross-country; Julien Absalon of France (2008 and 2012), and Tom Pidcock of Great Britain (2020 and 2024). The most decorated rider is the Swiss Nino Schurter, with gold, silver and bronze across three editions from 2008 to 2016, while three other riders have one gold, and one other medal.

Games	Gold	Silver	Bronze
1996 Atlanta	Bart Brentjens; Netherlands	Thomas Frischknecht; Switzerland	Miguel Martinez; France
2000 Sydney	Miguel Martinez; France	Filip Meirhaeghe; Belgium	Christoph Sauser; Switzerland
2004 Athens	Julien Absalon; France	José Antonio Hermida; Spain	Bart Brentjens; Netherlands
2008 Beijing	Julien Absalon; France	Jean-Christophe Péraud; France	Nino Schurter; Switzerland
2012 London	Jaroslav Kulhavý; Czech Republic	Nino Schurter; Switzerland	Marco Aurelio Fontana; Italy
2016 Rio de Janeiro	Nino Schurter; Switzerland	Jaroslav Kulhavý; Czech Republic	Carlos Coloma Nicolás; Spain
2020 Tokyo	Tom Pidcock; Great Britain	Mathias Flückiger; Switzerland	David Valero; Spain
2024 Paris	Tom Pidcock; Great Britain	Victor Koretzky; France	Alan Hatherly; South Africa
2028 Los Angeles			

=== BMX ===
==== Freestyle ====
Games	Gold	Silver	Bronze
2020 Tokyo	Logan Martin; Australia	Daniel Dhers; Venezuela	Declan Brooks; Great Britain
2024 Paris	José Torres; Argentina	Kieran Reilly; Great Britain	Anthony Jeanjean; France
2028 Los Angeles			

==== Racing ====
Games	Gold	Silver	Bronze
2008 Beijing	Māris Štrombergs; Latvia	Mike Day; United States	Donny Robinson; United States
2012 London	Māris Štrombergs; Latvia	Sam Willoughby; Australia	Carlos Oquendo; Colombia
2016 Rio de Janeiro	Connor Fields; United States	Jelle van Gorkom; Netherlands	Carlos Ramírez; Colombia
2020 Tokyo	Niek Kimmann; Netherlands	Kye Whyte; Great Britain	Carlos Ramírez; Colombia
2024 Paris	Joris Daudet; France	Sylvain André; France	Romain Mahieu; France
2028 Los Angeles			

== Discontinued events ==
=== Road cycling ===
==== Road race, team ====
Games	Gold	Silver	Bronze
1928 Amsterdam	Denmark; Henry Hansen; Orla Jørgensen; Leo Nielsen	Great Britain; Jack Lauterwasser; John Middleton; Frank Southall	Sweden; Gösta Carlsson; Erik Jansson; Georg Johnsson
1932 Los Angeles	Italy; Giuseppe Olmo; Attilio Pavesi; Guglielmo Segato	Denmark; Henry Hansen; Leo Nielsen; Frode Sørensen	Sweden; Arne Berg; Bernhard Britz; Sven Höglund
1936 Berlin	France; Robert Charpentier; Robert Dorgebray; Guy Lapébie	Switzerland; Edgar Buchwalder; Ernst Nievergelt; Kurt Ott	Belgium; Auguste Garrebeek; Armand Putzeys; François Vandermotte
1948 London	Belgium; Léon Delathouwer; Eugène van Roosbroeck; Lode Wouters	Great Britain; Robert John Maitland; Ian Scott; Gordon Thomas	France; José Beyaert; Jacques Dupont; Alain Moineau
1952 Helsinki	Belgium; Robert Grondelaers; André Noyelle; Lucien Victor	Italy; Dino Bruni; Gianni Ghidini; Vincenzo Zucconelli	France; Jacques Anquetil; Claude Rouer; Alfred Tonello
1956 Melbourne	France; Arnaud Geyre; Maurice Moucheraud; Michel Vermeulin	Great Britain; Arthur Brittain; William Holmes; Alan Jackson	United Team of Germany; Reinhold Pommer; Gustav-Adolf Schur; Horst Tüller

==== Time trial, team ====
Games	Gold	Silver	Bronze
1912 Stockholm	Sweden; Erik Friborg; Ragnar Malm; Axel Persson; Algot Lönn	Great Britain; Frederick Grubb; Leonard Meredith; Charles Moss; William Hammond	United States; Carl Schutte; Alvin Loftes; Albert Krushel; Walter Martin
1920 Antwerp	France; Achille Souchard; Fernand Canteloube; Georges Detreille; Marcel Gobillot	Sweden; Harry Stenqvist; Sigfrid Lundberg; Ragnar Malm; Axel Persson	Belgium; Albert Wyckmans; Albert De Bunné; Bernard Janssens; André Vercruysse
1924 Paris	France; Armand Blanchonnet; René Hamel; André Leducq; Georges Wambst	Belgium; Henri Hoevenaers; Auguste Parfondry; Jean Van Den Bosch; Fernand Saivé	Sweden; Gunnar Sköld; Erik Bohlin; Ragnar Malm; Erik Bjurberg
1928–1956	not included in the Olympic program		
1960 Rome	Italy; Livio Trapè; Antonio Bailetti; Ottavio Cogliati; Giacomo Fornoni	United Team of Germany; Gustav-Adolf Schur; Egon Adler; Erich Hagen; Günter Lörke	Soviet Union; Aleksei Petrov; Viktor Kapitonov; Yevgeny Klevtsov; Yury Melikhov
1964 Tokyo	Netherlands; Bart Zoet; Evert Dolman; Gerben Karstens; Jan Pieterse	Italy; Ferruccio Manza; Severino Andreoli; Luciano Dalla Bona; Pietro Guerra	Sweden; Sture Pettersson; Sven Hamrin; Erik Pettersson; Gösta Pettersson
1968 Mexico City	Netherlands; Joop Zoetemelk; Fedor den Hertog; Jan Krekels; René Pijnen	Sweden; Sture Pettersson; Tomas Pettersson; Erik Pettersson; Gösta Pettersson	Italy; Pierfranco Vianelli; Giovanni Bramucci; Vittorio Marcelli; Mauro Simonetti
1972 Munich	Soviet Union; Valery Yardy; Gennady Komnatov; Valery Likhachov; Boris Shukov	Poland; Ryszard Szurkowski; Edward Barcik; Lucjan Lis; Stanisław Szozda	None awarded
1976 Montreal	Soviet Union; Aavo Pikkuus; Valery Chaplygin; Anatoly Chukanov; Vladimir Kaminsky	Poland; Ryszard Szurkowski; Tadeusz Mytnik; Mieczysław Nowicki; Stanisław Szozda	Denmark; Jørn Lund; Verner Blaudzun; Gert Frank; Jørgen Hansen
1980 Moscow	Soviet Union; Yury Kashirin; Oleg Logvin; Sergei Shelpakov; Anatoly Yarkin	East Germany; Falk Boden; Bernd Drogan; Olaf Ludwig; Hans-Joachim Hartnick	Czechoslovakia; Michal Klasa; Vlastibor Konečný; Alipi Kostadinov; Jiří Škoda
1984 Los Angeles	Italy; Marcello Bartalini; Marco Giovannetti; Eros Poli; Claudio Vandelli	Switzerland; Alfred Achermann; Richard Trinkler; Laurent Vial; Benno Wiss	United States; Ron Kiefel; Clarence Knickman; Davis Phinney; Andrew Weaver
1988 Seoul	East Germany; Jan Schur; Uwe Ampler; Mario Kummer; Maik Landsmann	Poland; Andrzej Sypytkowski; Joachim Halupczok; Zenon Jaskuła; Marek Leśniewski	Sweden; Michel Lafis; Anders Jarl; Björn Johansson; Jan Karlsson
1992 Barcelona	Germany; Michael Rich; Bernd Dittert; Christian Meyer; Uwe Peschel	Italy; Andrea Peron; Flavio Anastasia; Luca Colombo; Gianfranco Contri	France; Jean-Louis Harel; Hervé Boussard; Didier Faivre-Pierret; Philippe Gaumont

=== Track cycling ===
==== Early Games (1896–1908) ====
During the first four Games of the Olympiad, track cycling events were held over various distances that were contested at one or two Games only.

Event	96	00	04	08	Gold	Silver	Bronze
¼ mile			•		Marcus Hurley; United States	Burton Downing; United States	Teddy Billington; United States
⅓ mile			•		Marcus Hurley; United States	Burton Downing; United States	Teddy Billington; United States
660 yards				•	Victor Johnson; Great Britain	Émile Demangel; France	Karl Neumer; Germany
½ mile			•		Marcus Hurley; United States	Teddy Billington; United States	Burton Downing; United States
1 mile			•		Marcus Hurley; United States	Burton Downing; United States	Teddy Billington; United States
2 miles			•		Burton Downing; United States	Oscar Goerke; United States	Marcus Hurley; United States
5 km				•	Benjamin Jones; Great Britain	Maurice Schilles; France	André Auffray; France
5 miles			•		Charles Schlee; United States	George E. Wiley; United States	Arthur F. Andrews; United States
10 km	•				Paul Masson; France	Léon Flameng; France	Adolf Schmal; Austria
20 km				•	Clarence Kingsbury; Great Britain	Benjamin Jones; Great Britain	Joseph Werbrouck; Belgium
25 km		•			Louis Bastien; France	Louis Hildebrand; France	Auguste Daumain; France
25 miles			•		Burton Downing; United States	Arthur F. Andrews; United States	George E. Wiley; United States
100 km	•				Léon Flameng; France	Georgios Kolettis; Greece	None awarded
100 km				•	Charles Bartlett; Great Britain	Charles Denny; Great Britain	Octave Lapize; France
12 hours	•				Adolf Schmal; Austria	Frederick Keeping; Great Britain	None awarded

==== 50 km ====
Games	Gold	Silver	Bronze
1920 Antwerp	Henry George; Belgium	Cyril Alden; Great Britain	Piet Ikelaar; Netherlands
1924 Paris	Ko Willems; Netherlands	Cyril Alden; Great Britain	Harry Wyld; Great Britain

==== Points race ====
Games	Gold	Silver	Bronze
1900 Paris	Enrico Brusoni; Italy	Karl Duill; Germany	Louis Trousselier; France
1904–1980	not included in the Olympic program		
1984 Los Angeles	Roger Ilegems; Belgium	Uwe Messerschmidt; West Germany	José Youshimatz; Mexico
1988 Seoul	Dan Frost; Denmark	Leo Peelen; Netherlands	Marat Ganeyev; Soviet Union
1992 Barcelona	Giovanni Lombardi; Italy	Léon van Bon; Netherlands	Cédric Mathy; Belgium
1996 Atlanta	Silvio Martinello; Italy	Brian Walton; Canada	Stuart O'Grady; Australia
2000 Sydney	Joan Llaneras; Spain	Milton Wynants; Uruguay	Alexei Markov; Russia
2004 Athens	Mikhail Ignatiev; Russia	Joan Llaneras; Spain	Guido Fulst; Germany
2008 Beijing	Joan Llaneras; Spain	Roger Kluge; Germany	Chris Newton; Great Britain

==== Pursuit, individual ====
Games	Gold	Silver	Bronze
1964 Tokyo	Jiří Daler; Czechoslovakia	Giorgio Ursi; Italy	Preben Esaksson; Denmark
1968 Mexico City	Daniel Rebillard; France	Mogens Frey Jensen; Denmark	Xaver Kurmann; Switzerland
1972 Munich	Knut Knudsen; Norway	Xaver Kurmann; Switzerland	Hans Lutz; West Germany
1976 Montreal	Gregor Braun; West Germany	Herman Ponsteen; Netherlands	Thomas Huschke; East Germany
1980 Moscow	Robert Dill-Bundi; Switzerland	Alain Bondue; France	Hans-Henrik Ørsted; Denmark
1984 Los Angeles	Steve Hegg; United States	Rolf Gölz; West Germany	Leonard Nitz; United States
1988 Seoul	Gintautas Umaras; Soviet Union	Dean Woods; Australia	Bernd Dittert; East Germany
1992 Barcelona	Chris Boardman; Great Britain	Jens Lehmann; Germany	Gary Anderson; New Zealand
1996 Atlanta	Andrea Collinelli; Italy	Philippe Ermenault; France	Bradley McGee; Australia
2000 Sydney	Robert Bartko; Germany	Jens Lehmann; Germany	Bradley McGee; Australia
2004 Athens	Bradley Wiggins; Great Britain	Bradley McGee; Australia	Sergi Escobar; Spain
2008 Beijing	Bradley Wiggins; Great Britain	Hayden Roulston; New Zealand	Steven Burke; Great Britain

==== Tandem ====
Games	Gold	Silver	Bronze
1908 London	André Auffray and Maurice Schilles; France	Frederick Hamlin and Horace Johnson; Great Britain	Charlie Brooks and Walter Isaacs; Great Britain
1912 Stockholm	not included in the Olympic program		
1920 Antwerp	Thomas Lance and Harry Ryan; Great Britain	William Smith and James Walker; South Africa	Frans de Vreng and Piet Ikelaar; Netherlands
1924 Paris	Lucien Choury and Jean Cugnot; France	Edmund Hansen and Willy Hansen; Denmark	Gerard Bosch van Drakestein and Maurice Peeters; Netherlands
1928 Amsterdam	Bernhard Leene and Daan van Dijk; Netherlands	Ernest Chambers and John Sibbit; Great Britain	Hans Bernhardt and Karl Köther; Germany
1932 Los Angeles	Louis Chaillot and Maurice Perrin; France	Ernest Chambers and Stanley Chambers; Great Britain	Harald Christensen and Willy Gervin; Denmark
1936 Berlin	Ernst Ihbe and Carl Lorenz; Germany	Bernhard Leene and Hendrik Ooms; Netherlands	Pierre Georget and Georges Maton; France
1948 London	Renato Perona and Ferdinando Teruzzi; Italy	Alan Bannister and Reg Harris; Great Britain	Gaston Dron and René Faye; France
1952 Helsinki	Lionel Cox and Russell Mockridge; Australia	Raymond Robinson and Thomas Shardelow; South Africa	Antonio Maspes and Cesare Pinarello; Italy
1956 Melbourne	Joey Browne and Tony Marchant; Australia	Ladislav Fouček and Václav Machek; Czechoslovakia	Giuseppe Ogna and Cesare Pinarello; Italy
1960 Rome	Giuseppe Beghetto and Sergio Bianchetto; Italy	Jürgen Simon and Lothar Stäber; United Team of Germany	Vladimir Leonov and Boris Vasilyev; Soviet Union
1964 Tokyo	Angelo Damiano and Sergio Bianchetto; Italy	Imants Bodnieks and Viktor Logunov; Soviet Union	Willi Fuggerer and Klaus Kobusch; United Team of Germany
1968 Mexico City	Daniel Morelon and Pierre Trentin; France	Leijn Loevesijn and Jan Janssen; Netherlands	Daniel Goens and Robert van Lancker; Belgium
1972 Munich	Vladimir Semenets and Igor Tselovalnikov; Soviet Union	Jürgen Geschke and Werner Otto; East Germany	Andrzej Bek and Benedykt Kocot; Poland

==== Time trial ====
Games	Gold	Silver	Bronze
1896 Athens	Paul Masson; France	Stamatios Nikolopoulos; Greece	Adolf Schmal; Austria
1900–1924	not included in the Olympic program		
1928 Amsterdam	Willy Hansen; Denmark	Gerard Bosch van Drakestein; Netherlands	Dunc Gray; Australia
1932 Los Angeles	Dunc Gray; Australia	Jacobus van Egmond; Netherlands	Charles Rampelberg; France
1936 Berlin	Arie van Vliet; Netherlands	Pierre Georget; France	Rudolf Karsch; Germany
1948 London	Jacques Dupont; France	Pierre Nihant; Belgium	Tommy Godwin; Great Britain
1952 Helsinki	Russell Mockridge; Australia	Marino Morettini; Italy	Raymond Robinson; South Africa
1956 Melbourne	Leandro Faggin; Italy	Ladislav Fouček; Czechoslovakia	Alfred Swift; South Africa
1960 Rome	Sante Gaiardoni; Italy	Dieter Gieseler; United Team of Germany	Rostislav Vargashkin; Soviet Union
1964 Tokyo	Patrick Sercu; Belgium	Giovanni Pettenella; Italy	Pierre Trentin; France
1968 Mexico City	Pierre Trentin; France	Niels Fredborg; Denmark	Janusz Kierzkowski; Poland
1972 Munich	Niels Fredborg; Denmark	Danny Clark; Australia	Jürgen Schütze; East Germany
1976 Montreal	Klaus-Jürgen Grünke; East Germany	Michel Vaarten; Belgium	Niels Fredborg; Denmark
1980 Moscow	Lothar Thoms; East Germany	Aleksandr Panfilov; Soviet Union	David Weller; Jamaica
1984 Los Angeles	Fredy Schmidtke; West Germany	Curtis Harnett; Canada	Fabrice Colas; France
1988 Seoul	Aleksandr Kirichenko; Soviet Union	Martin Vinnicombe; Australia	Robert Lechner; West Germany
1992 Barcelona	José Manuel Moreno; Spain	Shane Kelly; Australia	Erin Hartwell; United States
1996 Atlanta	Florian Rousseau; France	Erin Hartwell; United States	Takanobu Jumonji; Japan
2000 Sydney	Jason Queally; Great Britain	Stefan Nimke; Germany	Shane Kelly; Australia
2004 Athens	Chris Hoy; Great Britain	Arnaud Tournant; France	Stefan Nimke; Germany

== All-time medal table (Men's) 1896–Present ==
Rank	Nation	Gold	Silver	Bronze	Total
1	France	34	21	22	77
2	Italy	31	17	10	58
3	Great Britain	24	25	23	72
4	United States	12	13	15	40
5	Australia	10	14	13	37
6	Germany	10	9	13	32
7	Soviet Union	10	4	8	22
8	Netherlands	9	17	6	32
9	Denmark	7	9	10	26
10	Belgium	7	8	10	25
11	East Germany	6	5	4	15
12	Switzerland	5	7	4	16
13	Spain	5	5	3	13
14	West Germany	4	4	4	12
15	Sweden	3	3	8	14
16	Russia	3	1	4	8
17	Czechoslovakia	2	2	2	6
18	Latvia	2	0	1	3
19	South Africa	1	4	3	8
20	United Team of Germany	1	4	2	7
21	Greece	1	3	0	4
22	Czech Republic	1	1	0	2
22	Kazakhstan	1	1	0	2
24	Austria	1	0	2	3
24	Norway	1	0	2	3
26	Argentina	1	0	0	1
27	Poland	0	5	4	9
28	Canada	0	3	3	6
29	New Zealand	0	2	4	6
30	Japan	0	1	3	4
31	Colombia	0	1	2	3
32	Malaysia	0	1	1	2
33	Portugal	0	1	0	1
33	Ukraine	0	1	0	1
33	Uruguay	0	1	0	1
36	Jamaica	0	0	1	1
36	Mexico	0	0	1	1
Totals (37 entries)		192	193	188	573

== See also ==
- Cycling at the 1906 Intercalated Games — these Intercalated Games are no longer regarded as official Games by the International Olympic Committee
