= Cycling at the 1924 Summer Olympics – Men's team pursuit =

Men's team pursuit at the Games of the VIII Olympiad
- Venue: Vélodrome de Vincennes
- Dates: July 26–27
- Competitors: 40 from 10 nations

Medalists
1st place, gold medalist(s)		Angelo de Martino, Alfredo Dinale, Aurelio Menegazzi, Francesco Zucchetti; Italy
2nd place, silver medalist(s)		Józef Lange, Jan Lazarski, Tomasz Stankiewicz, Franciszek Szymczyk; Poland
3rd place, bronze medalist(s)		Léonard Daghelinckx, Henri Hoevenaers, Fernand Saivé, Jean Van Den Bosch; Belgium

The men's team pursuit event was part of the track cycling programme at the 1924 Summer Olympics.

The field consisted of 10 teams of four, with each team representing a different country. The Vélodrome de Vincennes track was a 500-metre (1,640 ft) loop. The format was a 4-kilometre (8 lap) team pursuit.

== Results ==
=== First round ===
The top finisher in each heat qualified for the quarterfinals. All other teams were eliminated. Italy and Denmark received byes.

Heat 1

Place	Team	Cyclists	Time	Qual.
1	Belgium	Léonard Daghelinckx; Henri Hoevenaers; Fernand Saivé; Jean Van Den Bosch	5:12.0	Q
2	Netherlands	Gerard Bosch; Jan Maas; Simon van Poelgeest; Franciscus Waterreus		

Heat 2

Place	Team	Cyclists	Time	Qual.
1	Italy	Angelo de Martino; Alfredo Dinale; Aurelio Menegazzi; Francesco Zucchetti	5:23.2	Q

Heat 3

Place	Team	Cyclists	Time	Qual.
1	Switzerland	Ernst Leutert; Arnold Nötzli; Ernst Richli; Gottfried Weilenmann	5:23.0	Q
2	Czechoslovakia	Jaroslav Brož; Oldřich Červinka; Miloš Knobloch; Karel Pechan		

Heat 4

Place	Team	Cyclists	Time	Qual.
1	Denmark	Holger Guldager; Edmund Hansen; Willy Hansen; Erik Kjeldsen	5:27.6	Q

Heat 5

Place	Team	Cyclists	Time	Qual.
1	France	Lucien Choury; René Guillemin; René Hournon; Marcel Renaud	5:11.4	Q
2	Great Britain	Frederick Habberfield; Thomas Harvey; Henry Lee; William Stewart		

Heat 6

Place	Team	Cyclists	Time	Qual.
1	Poland	Józef Lange; Jan Lazarski; Tomasz Stankiewicz; Franciszek Szymczyk	5:16.0	Q
2	Latvia	Andrejs Apsītis; Roberts Plūme; Fridrihs Ukstiņš; Artūrs Zeiberliņš		

=== Quarterfinals ===
The six winners of the first round competed in the quarterfinals. Again, the winner of each heat advanced; this time, a fastest loser also qualified.

Quarterfinal 1

Place	Team	Cyclists	Time	Qual.
1	Belgium	Léonard Daghelinckx; Henri Hoevenaers; Fernand Saivé; Jean Van Den Bosch	5:12.2	Q
2	Poland	Józef Lange; Jan Lazarski; Tomasz Stankiewicz; Franciszek Szymczyk	5:16.8	q

Quarterfinal 2

Place	Team	Cyclists	Time	Qual.
1	France	Lucien Choury; René Guillemin; René Hournon; Marcel Renaud	5:14.2	Q
2	Switzerland	Ernst Leutert; Arnold Nötzli; Ernst Richli; Gottfried Weilenmann	5:21.6	

Quarterfinal 3

Place	Team	Cyclists	Time	Qual.
1	Italy	Angelo de Martino; Alfredo Dinale; Aurelio Menegazzi; Francesco Zucchetti	5:13.8	Q
–	Denmark	Holger Guldager; Edmund Hansen; Willy Hansen; Erik Kjeldsen	Did not start	

=== Semifinals ===
The four remaining teams competed in two semifinals, with the winners advancing to the final and the losers facing off in a bronze medal race.

Semifinal 1

Place	Team	Cyclists	Time	Qual.
1	Italy	Angelo de Martino; Alfredo Dinale; Aurelio Menegazzi; Francesco Zucchetti	5:12.0	Q
2	Belgium	Léonard Daghelinckx; Henri Hoevenaers; Fernand Saivé; Jean Van Den Bosch		r

Semifinal 2

Place	Team	Cyclists	Time	Qual.
1	Poland	Józef Lange; Jan Lazarski; Tomasz Stankiewicz; Franciszek Szymczyk	5:18.0	Q
2	France	Lucien Choury; René Guillemin; René Hournon; Marcel Renaud	5:19.6	r

=== Bronze medal race ===
Belgium defeated France.

Place	Team	Cyclists	Time
1 ( (bronze) )	Belgium	Léonard Daghelinckx; Henri Hoevenaers; Fernand Saivé; Jean Van Den Bosch	
2 (4)	France	Lucien Choury; René Guillemin; René Hournon; Marcel Renaud	

=== Final ===
Italy and Poland competed for the top two spots, with Italy taking the prime honors.

Place	Team	Cyclists	Time
1st place, gold medalist(s)	Italy	Angelo de Martino; Alfredo Dinale; Aurelio Menegazzi; Francesco Zucchetti	5:15.0
2nd place, silver medalist(s)	Poland	Józef Lange; Jan Lazarski; Tomasz Stankiewicz; Franciszek Szymczyk	5:23.0
