= Cycling at the 1924 Summer Olympics =

Cycling at the Games of the VIII Olympiad
- Venues: Paris and surrounding area Vélodrome de Vincennes
- Date: 23 –27 July 1924
- Competitors: 139 from 24 nations

The cycling competition at the 1924 Summer Olympics in Paris consisted of two road cycling events and four track cycling events, all for men only. The 50 km track event was held for the last time at these Games, having only been introduced in 1920.

== Medal summary ==
=== Road cycling ===
Games	Gold	Silver	Bronze
Individual time trial	Armand Blanchonnet; France	Henri Hoevenaers; Belgium	René Hamel; France
Team time trial	France; Armand Blanchonnet; René Hamel; André Leducq; Georges Wambst	Belgium; Henri Hoevenaers; Auguste Parfondry; Jean Van Den Bosch; Fernand Saivé	Sweden; Gunnar Sköld; Erik Bohlin; Ragnar Malm; Erik Bjurberg

=== Track cycling ===
Games	Gold	Silver	Bronze
50 km	Ko Willems; Netherlands	Cyril Alden; Great Britain	Harry Wyld; Great Britain
Sprint	Lucien Michard; France	Jacob Meijer; Netherlands	Jean Cugnot; France
Tandem	Lucien Choury and Jean Cugnot; France	Edmund Hansen and Willy Hansen; Denmark	Gerard Bosch van Drakestein and Maurice Peeters; Netherlands
Team pursuit	Italy; Francesco Zucchetti; Angelo De Martini; Alfredo Dinale; Aurelio Menegazzi	Poland; Tomasz Stankiewicz; Franciszek Szymczyk; Józef Lange; Jan Lazarski	Belgium; Jean Van Den Bosch; Léonard Daghelinckx; Henri Hoevenaers; Fernand Saive

== Participating nations ==
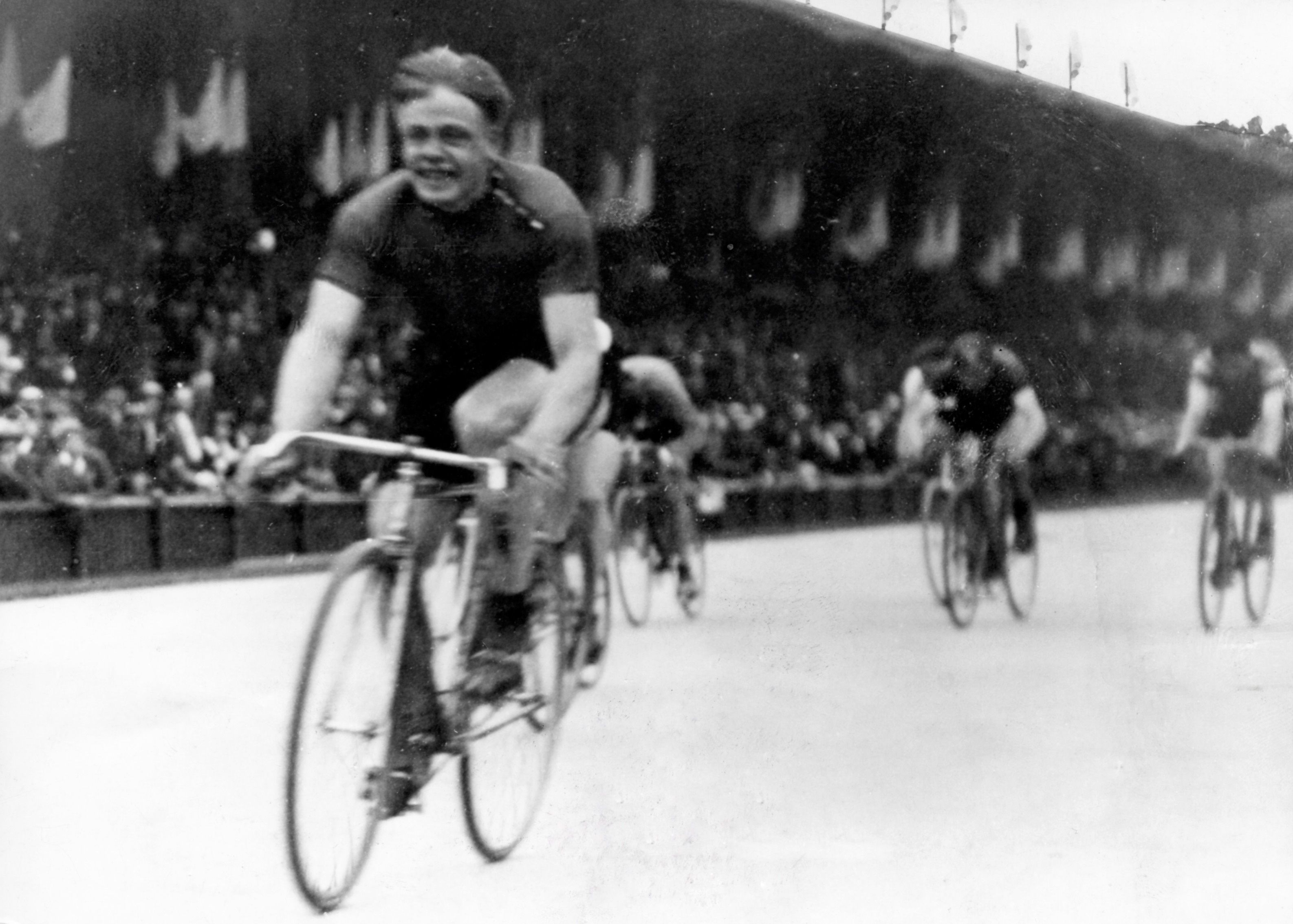
Finish of the men's 50 kilometres

A total of 139 cyclists from 24 nations competed at the Paris Games:

- Argentina (5)
- Australia (4)
- Belgium (9)
- Bulgaria (7)
- Canada (1)
- Chile (3)
- Czechoslovakia (8)
- Denmark (6)

- Egypt (3)
- Finland (4)
- France (11)
- Great Britain (12)
- Hungary (4)
- Italy (10)
- Latvia (4)
- Lithuania (2)

- Luxembourg (5)
- Netherlands (10)
- Poland (8)
- South Africa (1)
- Sweden (4)
- Switzerland (9)
- United States (5)
- Yugoslavia (4)

== Medal table ==
Rank	Nation	Gold	Silver	Bronze	Total
1	France	4	0	2	6
2	Netherlands	1	1	1	3
3	Italy	1	0	0	1
4	Belgium	0	2	1	3
5	Great Britain	0	1	1	2
6	Denmark	0	1	0	1
6	Poland	0	1	0	1
8	Sweden	0	0	1	1
Totals (8 entries)		6	6	6	18
