= Poland at the Olympics =

- IOC code: POL
- NOC: Polish Olympic Committee
- Website: www.olimpijski.pl (in Polish)
- Medals Ranked 23rd: Gold 80 Silver 103 Bronze 152 Total 335

Summer appearances
- 1924; 1928; 1932; 1936; 1948; 1952; 1956; 1960; 1964; 1968; 1972; 1976; 1980; 1984; 1988; 1992; 1996; 2000; 2004; 2008; 2012; 2016; 2020; 2024; 2028

Winter appearances
- 1924; 1928; 1932; 1936; 1948; 1952; 1956; 1960; 1964; 1968; 1972; 1976; 1980; 1984; 1988; 1992; 1994; 1998; 2002; 2006; 2010; 2014; 2018; 2022; 2026

Other related appearances
- Russian Empire (1900, 1912); Austria (1908–1912)

Poland first participated at the Olympic Games in 1924, and has sent athletes to compete in every Summer Olympic Games since then, except for the 1984 Games, when they were forced to be part of the Soviet-led boycott of the 1984 Summer Olympics. The nation has also participated in every Winter Olympic Games.

Polish athletes have won a total of 335 medals (80 gold, 103 silver, 152 bronze) in 21 different summer and 5 different winter sports and the country currently ranks 21st in the all-time Olympic Games medal count, with athletics as the top medal-producing sport. Poland is the second most successful country in total medals of those who have never hosted the Olympics. The nation's best overall performance at the Olympics occurred at the 1976 Summer Olympics in Montreal, with the country's athletes winning 7 gold, 6 silver and 13 bronze medals and finishing sixth in the medal table.

Its most successful teams have been football and volleyball. Poland ranks fifth all-time in modern pentathlon, seventh in athletics, and has also been successful in weightlifting, martial arts and Nordic skiing.

The National Olympic Committee for Poland is the Polish Olympic Committee (Polish: Polski Komitet Olimpijski, PKOl). The entity was created in 1918 and recognized in 1919.

== History ==
Poland officially made its debut at the Olympics in 1924, however, Polish athletes participated in earlier editions of the Olympic Games representing other nations. The first ever Olympic medal for Poland (silver) was won by track cyclists in team pursuit Franciszek Szymczyk, Jan Lazarski, Józef Lange and Tomasz Stankiewicz at the 1924 Summer Olympics in Paris while the first gold medal for Poland was won by discus thrower Halina Konopacka at the 1928 Summer Olympics in Amsterdam. The first Polish sportsperson who individually won two Olympic medals (silver and bronze) was equestrian Michał Antoniewicz in 1928.

After setting its gold medal high with seven in Montreal at the 1976 Summer Games, Poland won its largest number of medals to date (32) at the 1980 Summer Olympics in Moscow. Poland was forced to boycott the next Summer Olympic Games in Los Angeles by the Soviet Union, alongside another 13 Eastern Bloc countries in response to the American-led boycott of the 1980 Summer Olympics in Moscow in protest of the Soviet invasion of Afghanistan. The most successful Polish Olympian to date is Irena Szewińska with seven Olympic medals. With four gold medals, Robert Korzeniowski is the most successful Polish Olympian in terms of the number of gold medals.

== Medal tables ==
=== Medals by Summer Games ===
Games	Athletes	Gold	Silver	Bronze	Total	Rank
(French Third Republic) 1900 Paris	as part of the Russian Empire					
(United States) 1904 St. Louis	did not participate					
(United Kingdom) 1908 London	as part of Austria					
(Sweden) 1912 Stockholm	as part of the Russian Empire and Austria					
(Belgium) 1920 Antwerp	did not participate					
(French Third Republic) 1924 Paris	65	0	1	1	2	22
(Netherlands) 1928 Amsterdam^{[Art]}	93	1	1	3	5	21
(United States) 1932 Los Angeles^{[Art]}	51	2	1	4	7	14
(Nazi Germany) 1936 Berlin^{[Art]}	143	0	3	3	6	22
(United Kingdom) 1948 London^{[Art]}	37	0	0	1	1	34
(Finland) 1952 Helsinki	125	1	2	1	4	20
(Australia) 1956 Melbourne	64	1	4	4	9	17
(Italy) 1960 Rome	185	4	6	11	21	9
(Japan) 1964 Tokyo	140	7	6	10	23	7
1968 Mexico City	177	5	2	11	18	11
(West Germany) 1972 Munich	290	7	5	9	21	7
(Canada) 1976 Montreal	207	7	6	13	26	6
(Soviet Union) 1980 Moscow	306	3	14	15	32	10
(United States) 1984 Los Angeles	boycotted					
(South Korea) 1988 Seoul	143	2	5	9	16	20
(Spain) 1992 Barcelona	201	3	6	10	19	19
(United States) 1996 Atlanta	165	7	5	5	17	11
(Australia) 2000 Sydney	187	6	5	3	14	14
(Greece) 2004 Athens	194	3	2	5	10	23
(China) 2008 Beijing	268	4	5	2	11	17
(United Kingdom) 2012 London	218	3	2	6	11	24
(Brazil) 2016 Rio de Janeiro	242	2	3	6	11	33
(Japan) 2020 Tokyo	210	4	5	5	14	17
(France) 2024 Paris	213	1	4	5	10	42
(United States) 2028 Los Angeles	future event					
(Australia) 2032 Brisbane	future event					
Total (23/30)	3,924	73	93	142	308	20

- ^{Art comp.} Art competitions (1912–1948) are not included in the medal table above, as they were non-sports events formerly part of the Olympic Games. (Note: In 1952, art competition medals, as well as the gold medal awards for feats in alpinism and aeronautics, were removed from the official national medal counts. Only since 2021 have they been officially listed again by the IOC in the medal tables and respective NOC profile on its website. Poland won a total of eight art competition medals (3 gold, 2 silver, and 3 bronze), across the 1928, 1932, 1936, and 1948 Summer Olympics.) Poland won a total of eight art competition medals (3 gold, 2 silver, and 3 bronze), across the 1928, 1932, 1936, and 1948 Summer Olympics.

=== Medals by Winter Games ===
Games	Athletes	Gold	Silver	Bronze	Total	Rank
(France) 1924 Chamonix	7	0	0	0	0	–
(Switzerland) 1928 St. Moritz	26	0	0	0	0	–
(United States) 1932 Lake Placid	15	0	0	0	0	–
(Nazi Germany) 1936 Garmisch-Partenkirchen	20	0	0	0	0	–
(Switzerland) 1948 St. Moritz	29	0	0	0	0	–
(Norway) 1952 Oslo	30	0	0	0	0	–
(Italy) 1956 Cortina d'Ampezzo	51	0	0	1	1	12
(United States) 1960 Squaw Valley	13	0	1	1	2	11
(Austria) 1964 Innsbruck	51	0	0	0	0	–
(France) 1968 Grenoble	31	0	0	0	0	–
(Japan) 1972 Sapporo	47	1	0	0	1	13
(Austria) 1976 Innsbruck	56	0	0	0	0	–
(United States) 1980 Lake Placid	30	0	0	0	0	–
(Socialist Federal Republic of Yugoslavia) 1984 Sarajevo	30	0	0	0	0	–
(Canada) 1988 Calgary	32	0	0	0	0	–
(France) 1992 Albertville	53	0	0	0	0	–
(Norway) 1994 Lillehammer	28	0	0	0	0	–
(Japan) 1998 Nagano	39	0	0	0	0	–
(United States) 2002 Salt Lake City	27	0	1	1	2	21
(Italy) 2006 Turin	45	0	1	1	2	20
(Canada) 2010 Vancouver	47	1	3	2	6	15
(Russia) 2014 Sochi	58	4	1	1	6	11
(South Korea) 2018 Pyeongchang	62	1	0	1	2	20
(China) 2022 Beijing	57	0	0	1	1	27
(Italy) 2026 Milano Cortina	59	0	3	1	4	21
(France) 2030 French Alps	future event					
(United States) 2034 Utah	future event					
Total (25/25)	943	7	10	10	27	25

=== Medals by summer sport ===
Sport	Gold	Silver	Bronze	Total
Athletics	29	20	18	67
Boxing	8	10	26	44
Weightlifting	6	6	22	34
Wrestling	5	9	13	27
Fencing	4	9	10	23
Rowing	4	4	12	20
Shooting	4	3	5	12
Judo	3	3	2	8
Modern pentathlon	3	0	1	4
Equestrian	1	3	2	6
Swimming	1	3	2	6
Football	1	2	0	3
Sailing	1	1	3	5
Gymnastics	1	1	2	4
Volleyball	1	1	2	4
Sport climbing	1	0	1	2
Canoeing	0	9	14	23
Cycling	0	8	4	12
Archery	0	1	1	2
Handball	0	0	1	1
Tennis	0	0	1	1
Totals (21 entries)	73	93	142	308

=== Medals by winter sport ===
Sport	Gold	Silver	Bronze	Total
Ski jumping	4	5	4	13
Cross country skiing	2	1	2	5
Speed skating	1	3	3	7
Biathlon	0	1	0	1
Nordic combined	0	0	1	1
Totals (5 entries)	7	10	10	27

== Multiple medalists ==
Athlete	Sport	Olympics	Gold	Silver	Bronze	Total
Robert Korzeniowski	Athletics	1996–2004	4	0	0	4
Irena Szewińska	Athletics	1964–1976	3	2	2	7
Kamil Stoch	Ski jumping	2014–2018	3	0	1	4
Anita Włodarczyk	Athletics	2012–2020	3	0	0	3
Justyna Kowalczyk	Cross country skiing	2006–2014	2	1	2	5
Witold Woyda	Fencing	1964–1972	2	1	1	4
Renata Mauer	Shooting	1996–2000	2	0	1	3
Józef Szmidt	Athletics	1960–1964	2	0	0	2
Waldemar Baszanowski	Weightlifting	1964–1968	2	0	0	2
Jerzy Kulej	Boxing	1964–1968	2	0	0	2
Józef Zapędzki	Shooting	1968–1972	2	0	0	2
Waldemar Legień	Judo	1988–1992	2	0	0	2
Arkadiusz Skrzypaszek	Modern pentathlon	1992	2	0	0	2
Andrzej Wroński	Wrestling	1988–1996	2	0	0	2
Robert Sycz	Rowing	2000–2004	2	0	0	2
Tomasz Kucharski	Rowing	2000–2004	2	0	0	2
Tomasz Majewski	Athletics	2008–2012	2	0	0	2
Jerzy Pawłowski	Fencing	1956–1968	1	3	1	5
Otylia Jędrzejczak	Swimming	2000–2004	1	2	0	3
Teresa Ciepły	Athletics	1960–1964	1	1	1	3
Egon Franke	Fencing	1964–1968	1	1	1	3
Natalia Kaczmarek	Athletics	2020–2024	1	1	1	3
Stanisława Walasiewicz	Athletics	1932–1936	1	1	0	2
Elżbieta Krzesińska	Athletics	1956–1960	1	1	0	2
Józef Grudzień	Boxing	1964–1968	1	1	0	2
Lesław Ćmikiewicz	Football	1972–1976	1	1	0	2
Kazimierz Deyna	Football	1972–1976	1	1	0	2
Jerzy Gorgoń	Football	1972–1976	1	1	0	2
Kazimierz Kmiecik	Football	1972–1976	1	1	0	2
Grzegorz Lato	Football	1972–1976	1	1	0	2
Zygmunt Maszczyk	Football	1972–1976	1	1	0	2
Antoni Szymanowski	Football	1972–1976	1	1	0	2
Bronisław Malinowski	Athletics	1976–1980	1	1	0	2
Tadeusz Ślusarski	Athletics	1976–1980	1	1	0	2
Jacek Wszoła	Athletics	1976–1980	1	1	0	2
Jan Kowalczyk	Equestrian	1980	1	1	0	2
Szymon Kołecki	Weightlifting	2000–2008	1	1	0	2
Iga Baumgart-Witan	Athletics	2020	1	1	0	2
Małgorzata Hołub-Kowalik	Athletics	2020	1	1	0	2
Justyna Święty-Ersetic	Athletics	2020	1	1	0	2
Ireneusz Paliński	Weightlifting	1960–1964	1	0	1	2
Halina Górecka	Athletics	1960–1964	1	0	1	2
Marian Kasprzyk	Boxing	1960–1964	1	0	1	2
Ewa Kłobukowska	Athletics	1964	1	0	1	2
Lech Koziejowski	Fencing	1972–1980	1	0	1	2
Kazimierz Lipień	Wrestling	1972–1976	1	0	1	2
Jerzy Rybicki	Boxing	1976–1980	1	0	1	2
Mateusz Kusznierewicz	Sailing	1996–2004	1	0	1	2
Leszek Blanik	Gymnastics	2000–2008	1	0	1	2
Zbigniew Bródka	Speed skating	2014	1	0	1	2
Magdalena Fularczyk	Rowing	2012–2016	1	0	1	2
Wojciech Nowicki	Athletics	2016–2020	1	0	1	2
Adam Małysz	Ski jumping	2002–2010	0	3	1	4
Andrzej Piątkowski	Fencing	1956–1964	0	2	1	3
Ryszard Zub	Fencing	1956–1964	0	2	1	3
Wojciech Zabłocki	Fencing	1956–1964	0	2	1	3
Kacper Tomasiak	Ski jumping	2026	0	2	1	3
Marian Kuszewski	Fencing	1956–1960	0	2	0	2
Artur Olech	Boxing	1964–1968	0	2	0	2
Stanisław Szozda	Cycling	1972–1976	0	2	0	2
Ryszard Szurkowski	Cycling	1972–1976	0	2	0	2
Piotr Małachowski	Athletics	2008–2016	0	2	0	2
Maja Włoszczowska	Cycling	2008–2016	0	2	0	2
Karolina Naja	Canoeing	2012–2020	0	1	3	4
Aneta Konieczna	Canoeing	2000–2008	0	1	2	3
Beata Mikołajczyk	Canoeing	2008–2016	0	1	2	3
Zbigniew Pietrzykowski	Boxing	1956–1964	0	1	2	3
Józef Tracz	Wrestling	1988–1996	0	1	2	3
Michał Antoniewicz	Equestrian	1928	0	1	1	2
Janusz Pawłowski	Judo	1980–1988	0	1	1	2
Marek Dopierała	Canoeing	1988	0	1	1	2
Marek Łbik	Canoeing	1988	0	1	1	2
Izabela Dylewska	Canoeing	1988–1992	0	1	1	2
Artur Partyka	Athletics	1992–1996	0	1	1	2
Sylwia Gruchała	Fencing	2000–2004	0	1	1	2
Agata Wróbel	Weightlifting	2000–2004	0	1	1	2
Katarzyna Bachleda-Curuś	Speed skating	2010–2014	0	1	1	2
Katarzyna Woźniak	Speed skating	2010–2014	0	1	1	2
Luiza Złotkowska	Speed skating	2010–2014	0	1	1	2
Agnieszka Kobus-Zawojska	Rowing	2016–2020	0	1	1	2
Maria Sajdak	Rowing	2016–2020	0	1	1	2
Anna Puławska	Canoeing	2020	0	1	1	2
Marian Zieliński	Weightlifting	1956–1968	0	0	3	3
Teodor Kocerka	Rowing	1952–1960	0	0	2	2
Krystyna Czajkowska	Volleyball	1964–1968	0	0	2	2
Krystyna Jakubowska	Volleyball	1964–1968	0	0	2	2
Krystyna Krupa	Volleyball	1964–1968	0	0	2	2
Jadwiga Książek	Volleyball	1964–1968	0	0	2	2
Józefa Ledwig	Volleyball	1964–1968	0	0	2	2
Zofia Szczęśniewska	Volleyball	1964–1968	0	0	2	2
Leszek Błażyński	Boxing	1972–1976	0	0	2	2
Janusz Gortat	Boxing	1972–1976	0	0	2	2
Beata Sokołowska-Kulesza	Canoeing	2000–2004	0	0	2	2
Dawid Kubacki	Ski jumping	2018–2022	0	0	2	2

== Medals in art competitions ==
In addition to its accomplishments in sport, Poland has also earned recognition in Olympic art competitions—one of the three non-sports events once included in the Olympic Games. The country won a total of eight art competition medals (3 gold, 2 silver, and 3 bronze), across the 1928, 1932, 1936, and 1948 Summer Olympics. These events were part of the official Olympic program in seven Summer Games, from 1912 to 1948. In 1952, the International Olympic Committee (IOC) formally discontinued all non-sport events (including art competitions), as well as awards for feats (such as alpinism and aeronautics). These were subsequently removed from official national medal counts.

=== Medalists ===
Medal	Name	Games	Event	Piece
Gold	Kazimierz Wierzyński	(Netherlands) 1928 Amsterdam	Literature, Lyric works	"Laur Olimpijski"
Bronze	Władysław Skoczylas	(Netherlands) 1928 Amsterdam	Painting, Drawings	"Archer"
Gold	Józef Klukowski	(United States) 1932 Los Angeles	Sculpture, Medals And Reliefs	"Sport Sculpture II"
Silver	Janina Konarska	(United States) 1932 Los Angeles	Painting, Graphic Arts	"Stadium"
Silver	Józef Klukowski	(Germany) 1936 Berlin	Sculpture, Reliefs	"Ball"
Bronze	Jan Parandowski	(Germany) 1936 Berlin	Literature, Epic works	"Olympic Discus"
Bronze	Stanisław Ostoja-Chrostowski	(Germany) 1936 Berlin	Painting, Applied Arts	"Yachting Club Certificate"
Gold	Zbigniew Turski	(United Kingdom) 1948 London	Music, Compositions for Qrchestra	"Olympic Symphony"

== Flag bearers ==
- 2024 Paris – Anita Włodarczyk (athletics) and Przemysław Zamojski (basketball)
- 2022 Beijing – Aleksandra Król (snowboarding) and Zbigniew Bródka (speed skating)
- 2020 Tokyo – Paweł Korzeniowski (swimming), Maja Włoszczowska (mountain biking)
- 2018 Pyeongchang – Zbigniew Bródka (speed skating)
- 2016 Rio de Janeiro – Karol Bielecki (handball)
- 2014 Sochi – Dawid Kupczyk (bobsleigh)
- 2012 London – Agnieszka Radwańska (tennis)
- 2010 Vancouver – Konrad Niedźwiedzki (speed skating)
- 2008 Beijing – Marek Twardowski (canoe racing)
- 2006 Turin – Paulina Ligocka (snowboarding)
- 2004 Athens – Bartosz Kizierowski (swimming)
- 2002 Salt Lake City – Mariusz Siudek (figure skating)
- 2000 Sydney – Andrzej Wroński (wrestling)
- 1998 Nagano – Jan Ziemianin (biathlon)
- 1996 Atlanta – Rafał Szukała (swimming)
- 1994 Lillehammer – Tomasz Sikora (biathlon)
- 1992 Barcelona – Waldemar Legień (judo)
- 1992 Albertville – Henryk Gruth (ice hockey)
- 1988 Seoul – Bogdan Daras (wrestling)
- 1988 Calgary – Henryk Gruth (ice hockey)
- 1984 Sarajevo – Józef Łuszczek (cross-country skiing)
- 1980 Moscow – Czesław Kwieciński (wrestling)
- 1980 Lake Placid – Józef Łuszczek (cross-country skiing)
- 1976 Montreal – Grzegorz Śledziewski (canoe racing)
- 1976 Innsbruck – Wojciech Truchan (biathlon)
- 1972 Munich – Waldemar Baszanowski (weightlifting)
- 1972 Sapporo – Andrzej Bachleda (alpine skiing)
- 1968 Mexico City – Waldemar Baszanowski (weightlifting)
- 1968 Grenoble – Stanisław Szczepaniak (biathlon)
- 1964 Tokyo – Waldemar Baszanowski (weightlifting)
- 1964 Innsbruck – Jerzy Wojnar (luge)
- 1960 Rome – Teodor Kocerka (rowing)
- 1960 Squaw Valley – Józef Karpiel (Nordic combined/cross-country skiing)
- 1956 Melbourne – Tadeusz Rut (athletics)
- 1956 Cortina d'Ampezzo – Tadeusz Kwapień (cross-country skiing)
- 1952 Helsinki – Teodor Kocerka (rowing)
- 1952 Oslo – Stanisław Marusarz (ski jumping)
- 1948 London – Mieczysław Łomowski (athletics)
- 1948 St. Moritz – Stanisław Marusarz (ski jumping)
- 1936 Berlin – Klemens Biniakowski (athletics)
- 1936 Garmisch-Partenkirchen – Bronisław Czech (ski jumping/Nordic combined/Alpine skiing)
- 1932 Los Angeles – Janusz Ślązak (rowing)
- 1932 Lake Placid – Józef Stogowski (ice hockey)
- 1928 Amsterdam – Marian Cieniewski (wrestling)
- 1928 St. Moritz – Andrzej Krzeptowski I (ski jumping/Nordic combined)
- 1924 Paris – Sławosz Szydłowski (athletics)
- 1924 Chamonix – Kazimierz Smogorzewski (sports journalist)

== See also ==
- Category:Olympic competitors for Poland
- Poland at the Paralympics
