= Marcel Renaud =

Marcel Renaud may refer to:

- Marcel Renaud (cyclist) (1900–1968), French Olympic cyclist
- Marcel Renaud (canoeist) (1926–2016), his nephew, French Olympic sprint canoer
