= Philippe Renaud =

French sprint canoer (born 1962)

Medal record

Men's canoe sprint

Olympic Games
| Bronze medal – third place | 1988 Seoul | C-2 500 m |

World Championships
| Silver medal – second place | 1991 Paris | C-4 500 m |
| Bronze medal – third place | 1989 Plovdiv | C-2 500 m |
| Bronze medal – third place | 1989 Plovdiv | C-4 500 m |

Philippe Renaud (born 23 November 1962) is a French sprint canoeist who competed during the 1980s. Competing in two Summer Olympics, he won a bronze in the C-2 500 m event at Seoul in 1988.

Renaud also won three medals at the ICF Canoe Sprint World Championships with a silver (C-4 500 m: 1991) and two bronzes (C-2 500 m and C-4 500 m: both 1989).

His father, Marcel won a silver in the C-2 10000 m event at Melbourne in 1956. His brother, Eric, won a bronze in the C-2 1000 m event at Los Angeles in 1984. A great-uncle, also named Marcel, finished fourth in the 4000 m team pursuit cycling event at Paris in 1924.
