= Henri Hoevenaers =

Belgian cyclist

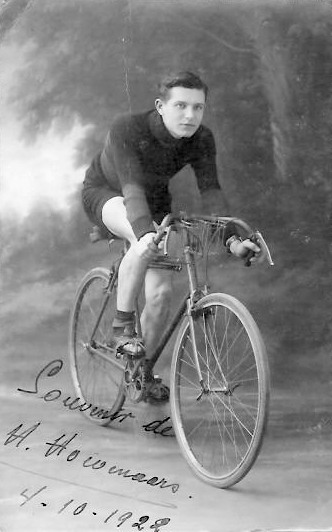
- Henri Hoevenaars in 1922

Personal information
- Born: 1 May 1902 Antwerp, Belgium
- Died: 12 November 1958 (aged 56) Antwerp, Belgium

Sport
- Sport: Cycling
Medal record
Representing Belgium
Olympic Games
Silver medal – second place	1924 Paris	Individual time trial
Silver medal – second place	1924 Paris	Team time trial
Bronze medal – third place	1924 Paris	Team pursuit
World Championships
Gold medal – first place	1925 Apeldoorn	Amateur's road race

Henri "Rik" Hoevenaers (1 May 1902 – 12 November 1958) was a Belgian road cyclist who won three medals at the 1924 Summer Olympics, including a silver in the individual time trial, a silver in the team time trial (with Auguste Parfondry and Jean Van Den Bosch), and a bronze in the team pursuit (with Van Den Bosch, Léonard Daghelinckx and Fernand Saivé). He also won the road race at the 1925 World Championships. Hoevenaers turned professional in 1926. His father Josef and son Jos were also professional cyclists.
