= Cycling at the 1924 Summer Olympics – Men's tandem =

Men's tandem events at the Olympics

Men's tandem at the Games of the VIII Olympiad
- Venue: Vélodrome de Vincennes
- Dates: July 26–27
- Competitors: 10 from 5 nations

Medalists
1st place, gold medalist(s)		Lucien Choury, Jean Cugnot; France
2nd place, silver medalist(s)		Edmund Hansen, Willy Hansen; Denmark
3rd place, bronze medalist(s)		Gerard Bosch van Drakestein, Maurice Peeters; Netherlands

Video

The men's tandem event was part of the track cycling programme at the 1924 Summer Olympics.

The field consisted of 5 pairs of cyclists, each pair from a different country. The Vélodrome de Vincennes track was a 500-metre (1,640 ft) loop.

== Results ==
=== Semifinals ===
The five pairs were divided into three heats, with the French team getting a bye while the other two heats featured two pairs.

Semifinal 1

Place	Cyclists	Time	Qual.
1	Gerard Bosch van Drakestein (NED); Maurice Peeters (NED)	12.6	Q
2	János Grimm (HUN); Ferenc Uhereczky (HUN)		

Semifinal 2

Place	Cyclists	Time	Qual.
1	Lucien Choury (FRA); Jean Cugnot (FRA)	14.0	Q

Semifinal 3

Place	Cyclists	Time	Qual.
1	Edmund Hansen (DEN); Willy Hansen (DEN)	12.8	Q
2	Frederick Habberfield (GBR); Thomas Harvey (GBR)		

=== Final ===
The final three pairs competed for the three medals. The French led most of the way, with the Dutch taking a brief lead before veering off. Bosch later explained that Peeters had finished a bottle of cognac before the final.

Place	Cyclists	Time
1st place, gold medalist(s)	Lucien Choury (FRA); Jean Cugnot (FRA)	12.06
2nd place, silver medalist(s)	Edmund Hansen (DEN); Willy Hansen (DEN)	
3rd place, bronze medalist(s)	Gerard Bosch van Drakestein (NED); Maurice Peeters (NED)	
