= Marcel Renaud (canoeist) =

French canoeist (1926–2016)

Personal information
- Nationality: French
- Born: 27 May 1926
- Died: 5 December 2016 (aged 90)

Sport
- Country: France
- Sport: Canoeing
Medal record
Representing France
Men's canoe sprint
Olympic Games
Silver medal – second place	1956 Melbourne	C-2 10000 m
Canoe Sprint World Championships
Bronze medal – third place	1954 Mâcon	K-4 1000 m
Men's canoe slalom
Canoe Slalom World Championships
Gold medal – first place	1949 Geneva	C-1 team

Marcel Renaud (27 May 1926 – 5 December 2016) was a French sprint and slalom canoeist who competed in the 1940s and the 1950s. Competing in two Summer Olympics, he won a silver medal in the C-2 10000 m event at Melbourne in 1956. Renaud also won a bronze medal in the K-4 1000 m at the 1954 ICF Canoe Sprint World Championships at Mâcon. In canoe slalom, he won a gold medal in the C-1 team event at the 1949 ICF Canoe Slalom World Championships in Geneva.

Renaud's uncle Marcel finished fourth in the 4000 m team pursuit cycling event at Paris in 1924. Both of his sons would win Olympic canoeing medals of their own. His oldest son, Eric, won a bronze in the C-2 1000 m event at the 1984 Summer Olympics in Los Angeles while his youngest son, Philippe, won a bronze in the C-2 500 m at the 1988 Summer Olympics in Seoul.
