= Leutert =

Leutert is a surname. Notable people with the surname include:

- Ernst Leutert (1898–1966), Swiss cyclist
- Michael Leutert (born 1974), German politician
