= Edmund Hansen =

Edmund Hansen may refer to:

- Edmund H. Hansen (1894–1962), American sound engineer
- Edmund Hansen (cyclist) (1900–1995), Danish Olympic cyclist
