= Gottfried Weilenmann =

Gottfried Weilenmann may refer to:

- Gottfried Weilenmann (cyclist, born 1894) (1894–?), Swiss cyclist
- Gottfried Weilenmann (cyclist, born 1920) (1920–2018), Swiss cyclist, and son of the above cyclist
