= Simon van Poelgeest =

Dutch cyclist

Personal information
- Born: 27 August 1900 Amsterdam, Netherlands
- Died: 9 July 1978 (aged 77) Haarlem, Netherlands

Cycling career
- Sport: Cycling

Simon van Poelgeest (27 August 1900 – 9 July 1978) was a Dutch cyclist. He competed in the team pursuit at the 1924 Summer Olympics.

== See also ==
- List of Dutch Olympic cyclists
