= Arnold Nötzli =

Swiss cyclist

Personal information
- Born: 1900

Cycling career
- Sport: Cycling

Arnold Nötzli (born 1900, date of death unknown) was a Swiss cyclist. He competed in the team pursuit at the 1924 Summer Olympics.
