= René Hournon =

French cyclist

Personal information
- Born: 7 February 1905
- Died: 16 May 1979 (aged 74)

Cycling career
- Sport: Cycling

René Hournon (7 February 1905 – 16 May 1979) was a French cyclist. He competed in the team pursuit at the 1924 Summer Olympics.
