= Franciscus Waterreus =

Dutch cyclist

Personal information
- Born: 19 November 1902 Stratum, Netherlands
- Died: 11 December 1962 (aged 60) Eindhoven, Netherlands

Cycling career
- Sport: Cycling

Franciscus Waterreus (19 November 1902 – 11 December 1962) was a Dutch cyclist. He competed in the team pursuit at the 1924 Summer Olympics.

== See also ==
- List of Dutch Olympic cyclists
