= Marcel Renaud (cyclist) =

French cyclist

Personal information
- Full name: Marcel Renaud
- Born: 2 June 1909 Paris, France
- Died: 17 June 1968 (aged 67) Paris, France

Cycling career
- Sport: Cycling
- Discipline: Track
- Role: Rider

Marcel Renaud (2 June 1909 – 17 June 1968) was a French racing cyclist who competed in the mid-1920s. He finished fourth in the 4000 m team pursuit event at the 1924 Summer Olympics in Paris.

Renaud's nephew, also named Marcel, won a silver in the C-2 10000 m at the 1956 Summer Olympics in Melbourne. Two of his great-nephews, Eric and Philippe, won bronze medals in canoeing at the Summer Olympics. Eric won his in the C-2 1000 m event at Los Angeles in 1984 while Philippe won his in the C-2 500 m event at Seoul in 1988.
