= Karel Pechan =

Czech cyclist

Personal information
- Born: 22 February 1901

Cycling career
- Sport: Cycling

Karel Pechan (born 22 February 1901, date of death unknown) was a Czech cyclist. He competed in the team pursuit at the 1924 Summer Olympics.
