= René Guillemin =

French cyclist

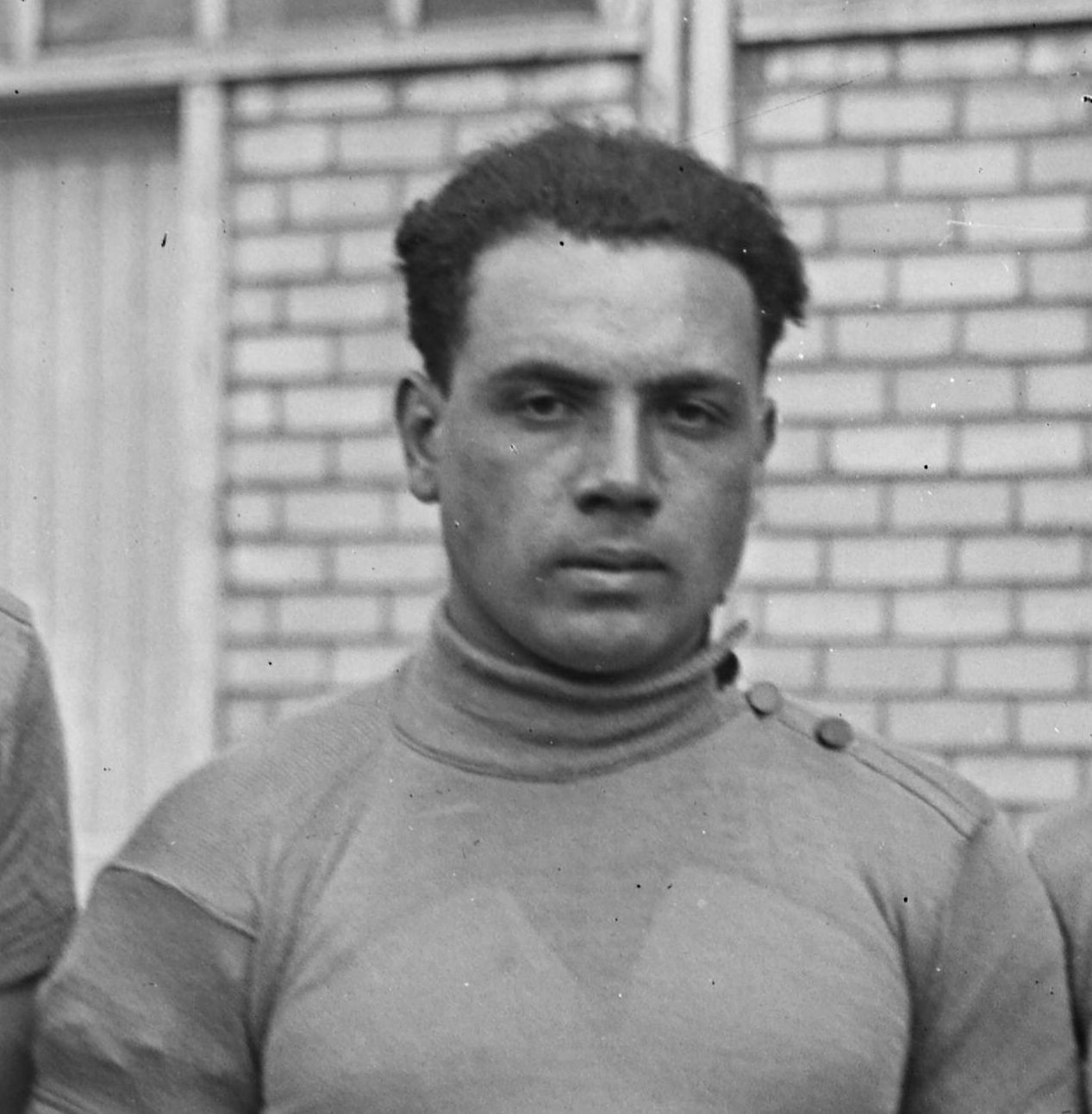

Personal information
- Born: 31 January 1898
- Died: 2 June 1970 (aged 72)

Cycling career
- Sport: Cycling

René Guillemin (31 January 1898 – 2 June 1970) was a French cyclist. He competed in the team pursuit at the 1924 Summer Olympics.
