= Erik Kjeldsen =

Danish cyclist

Personal information
- Born: 20 October 1890 Copenhagen, Denmark
- Died: 22 February 1976 (aged 85) Gentofte, Denmark

Cycling career
- Sport: Cycling

Jens Erik Kjeldsen (Danish pronunciation: [ˈkʰelˀsn̩]; 20 October 1890 – 22 February 1976) was a Danish cyclist. He competed in the team pursuit at the 1924 Summer Olympics.
