= Gottfried Weilenmann (cyclist, born 1894) =

Swiss cyclist

Personal information
- Born: 1894
- Died: Unknown

Cycling career
- Sport: Cycling

Gottfried Weilenmann (born 1894 — ?) was a Swiss cyclist. He competed in the team pursuit at the 1924 Summer Olympics.
