= Ernst Leutert =

Swiss cyclist

Personal information
- Born: 1898
- Died: 1966 (aged 67–68)

Cycling career
- Sport: Cycling

Ernst Leutert (1898 – 1966) was a Swiss cyclist. He competed in the team pursuit at the 1924 Summer Olympics.
