= Fridrihs Ukstiņš =

Latvian cyclist

Personal information
- Born: 15 November 1895 Riga, Russian Empire
- Died: May 1972 (aged 76)

Cycling career
- Sport: Cycling

Fridrihs Ukstiņš (15 November 1895 – May 1972) was a Latvian cyclist. He competed at the 1924 Summer Olympics and the 1928 Summer Olympics.
