= Lucien Choury =

French cyclist (1898–1987)

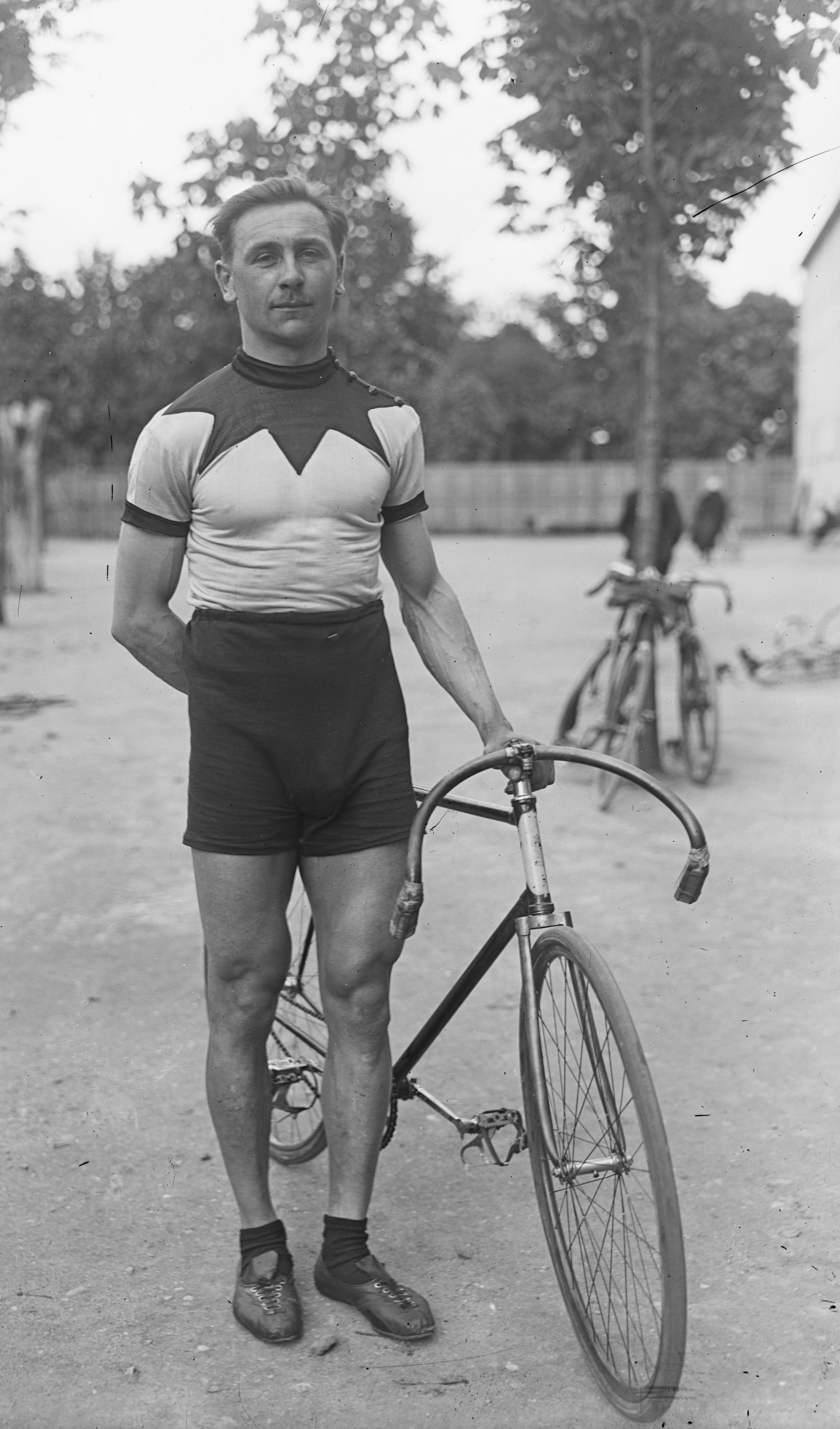

Personal information
- Full name: Lucien Choury
- Born: 26 March 1898
- Died: 6 May 1987 (aged 89)

Cycling career
- Sport: Cycling
- Discipline: Track
- Role: Rider
Medal record
Men's cycling
Representing France
Olympic Games
Gold medal – first place	1924 Paris	Men's tandem

Lucien Choury (26 March 1898 – 6 May 1987) was a French cyclist. He won the gold medal in Men's tandem along with Jean Cugnot at the 1924 Summer Olympics
