= Alfredo Dinale =

Italian cyclist

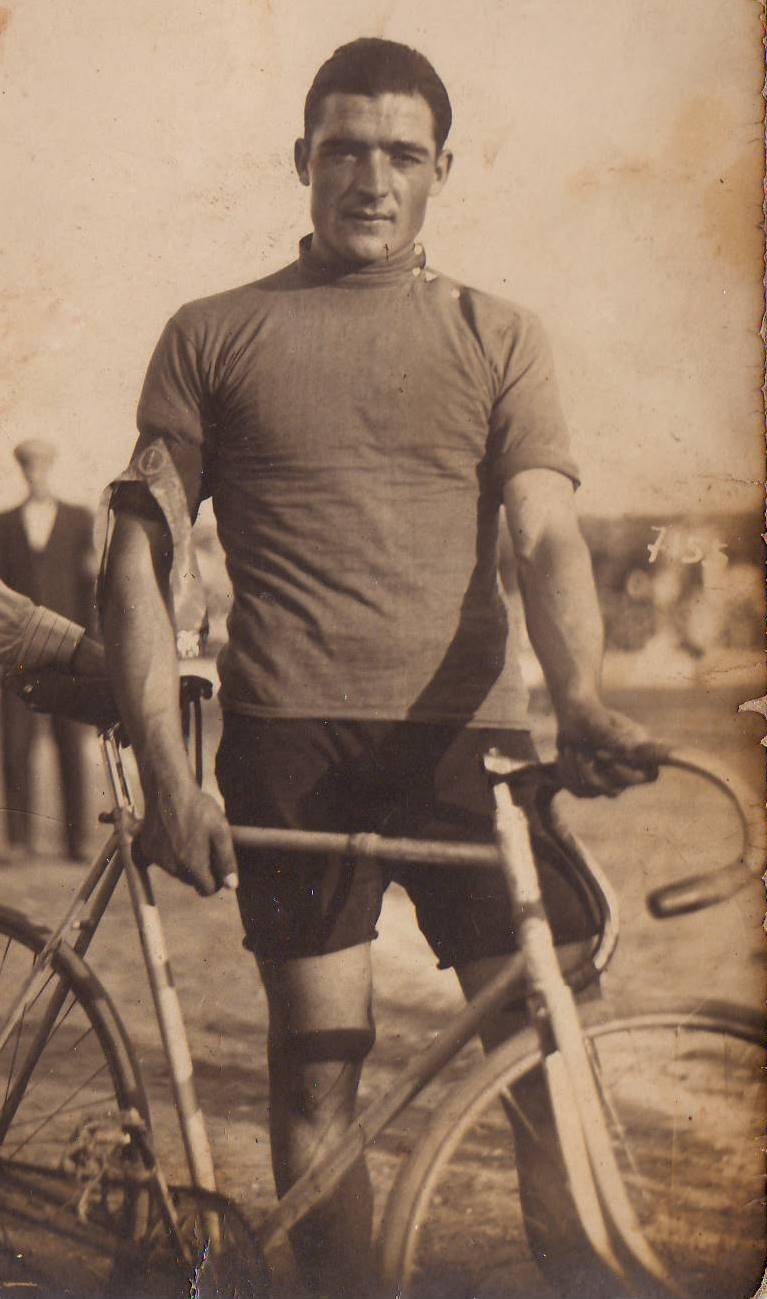

Personal information
- Born: 11 March 1900 Vallonara di Marostica, Italy
- Died: 3 December 1976 (aged 76) Vicenza, Italy

Cycling career
- Sport: Cycling
- Disciplines: Road and track
- Role: Rider

Major wins
- Giro d'Italia, 2 stages (1929); Coppa Bernocchi (1924); Six Days of Dortmund (1929); Six Days of Paris (1931); Six Days of Frankfurt (1931)
Medal record
Men's track cycling
Representing Italy
Olympic Games
Gold medal – first place	1924 Paris	Team pursuit

Alfredo Dinale (11 March 1900 – 3 December 1976, Vicenza) was an Italian racing cyclist and Olympic champion in track cycling.

He won the gold medal in team pursuit at the 1924 Summer Olympics in Paris.

He won the bicycle race Coppa Bernocchi in 1924.
