= Francesco Zucchetti =

Italian cyclist (1902–1980)

Personal information
- Full name: Francesco Zucchetti
- Born: 14 April 1902 Cernusco sul Naviglio, Italy
- Died: 8 February 1980 (aged 77) Trichiana, Italy

Cycling career
- Sport: Cycling
- Discipline: Track
- Role: Rider
Medal record
Representing Italy
Men's track cycling
Olympic Games
Gold medal – first place	Paris 1924	Team pursuit

Francesco Zucchetti (14 April 1902 – 8 February 1980) was an Italian racing cyclist and Olympic champion in track cycling. He won a gold medal in the team pursuit at the 1924 Summer Olympics in Paris.
