= Angelo De Martini =

Italian cyclist (1897–1979)

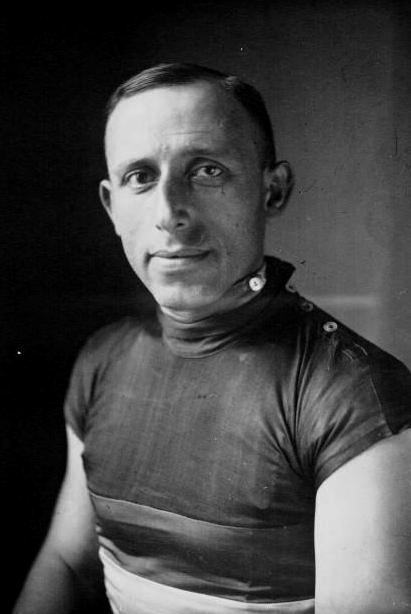

Personal information
- Born: 24 January 1897 Villafranca di Verona, Italy
- Died: 12 August 1979 (aged 82) Verona, Italy

Cycling career
- Sport: Cycling
- Disciplines: Road and track
- Role: Rider
Medal record
Representing Italy
Olympic Games
Gold medal – first place	1924 Paris	Team pursuit

Angelo De Martini (24 January 1897 – 12 August 1979) was an Italian racing cyclist and Olympic champion in track cycling.

== Biography ==
Martini was born in Villafranca di Verona. He received a gold medal in team pursuit at the 1924 Summer Olympics in Paris. He died in Verona, aged 82.
