= Aurelio Menegazzi =

Italian cyclist (1900–1979)

Personal information
- Nickname: Aléardo
- Born: 15 November 1900 Buttapietra, Italy
- Died: 23 November 1979 (aged 79) Milan, Italy

Cycling career
- Sport: Cycling
- Disciplines: Road and track
- Role: Rider
Medal record
Representing Italy
Olympic Games
Gold medal – first place	Paris 1924	Team pursuit

Aurelio Menegazzi (15 November 1900 – 23 November 1979), also known as Aléardo Menegazzi, was an Italian racing cyclist and Olympic champion in track cycling. He won a gold medal in the team pursuit at the 1924 Summer Olympics in Paris.
