= Auguste Parfondry =

Belgian cyclist

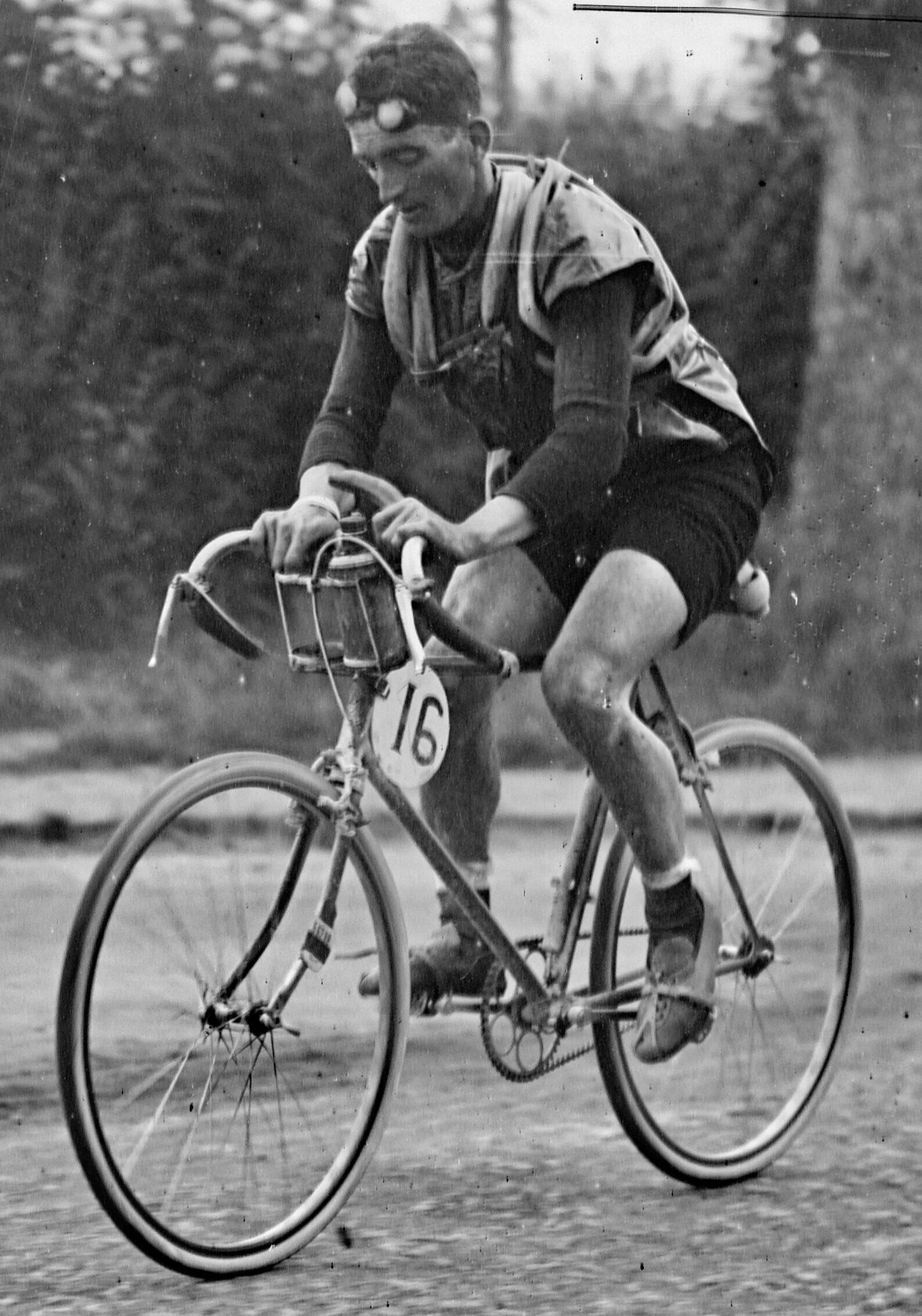

Personal information
- Born: 12 February 1896 Havelange, Namur, Belgium
- Died: 28 September 1978 (aged 82)

Cycling career
- Sport: Cycling
Medal record
Men's road bicycle racing
Representing Belgium
Olympic Games
Silver medal – second place	1924 Paris	Team road race

Auguste Parfondry (12 February 1896 – 28 September 1978) was a cyclist from Belgium. He won the silver medal in the Team Road race in the 1924 Summer Olympics in Paris.
