= Jean Van Den Bosch =

Belgian cyclist

Personal information
- Born: 5 August 1898 Brussels, Belgium
- Died: 1 July 1985 (aged 86)

Cycling career
- Sport: Cycling
Medal record
Representing Belgium
Men's track cycling
Olympic Games
Silver medal – second place	1924 Paris	Team Road Race
Bronze medal – third place	1924 Paris	Team Pursuit Men

Jean Van Den Bosch (5 August 1898 in Brussels – 1 July 1985 in Molenbeek-Saint-Jean) was a cyclist from Belgium. He won the silver medal in the Team Road race and a bronze medal in the Team Pursuit for Men at the 1924 Summer Olympics in Paris.
