= Fernand Saivé =

Belgian cyclist

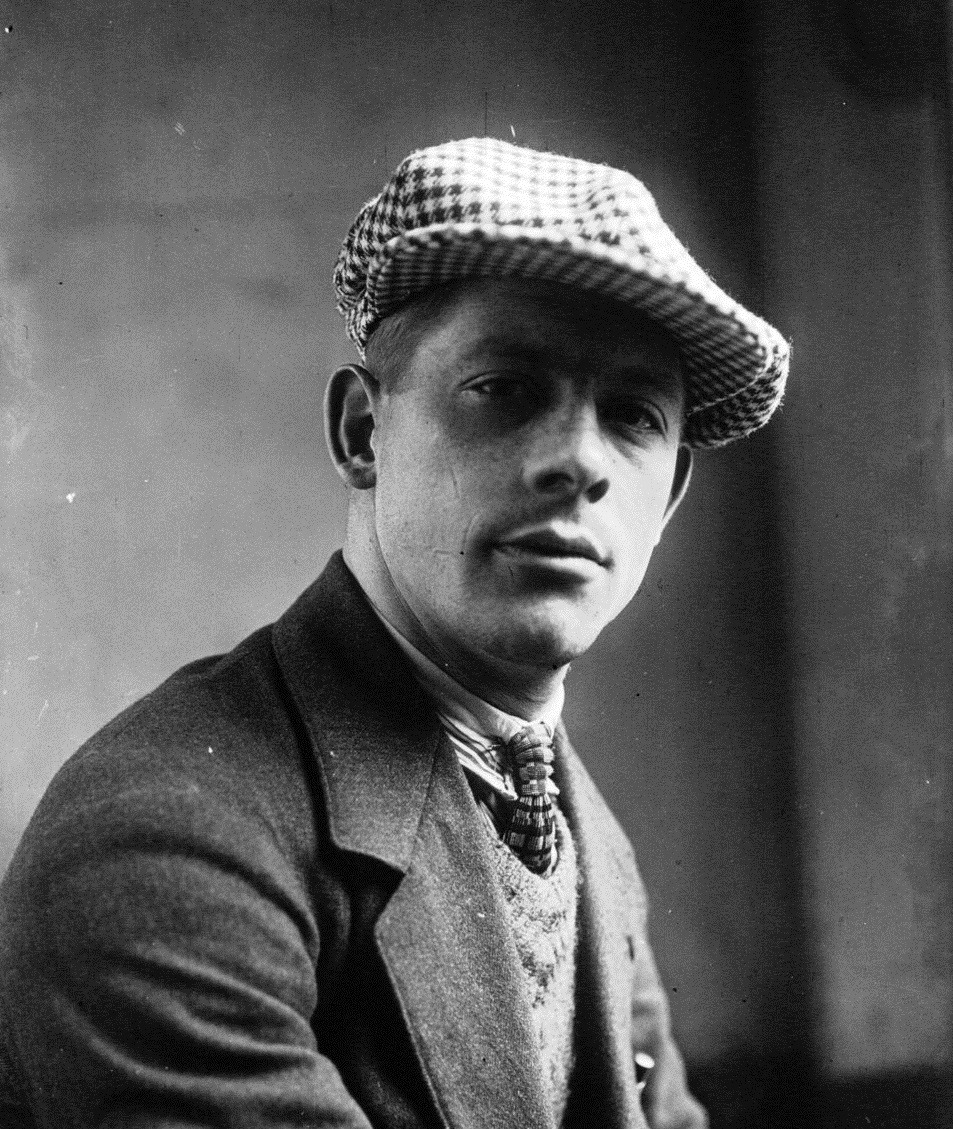
- Saivé in 1926

Personal information
- Born: 24 May 1900 Dison, Belgium
- Died: 21 April 1981 (aged 80) Anderlecht, Belgium

Cycling career
- Sport: Cycling
Medal record
Representing Belgium
Olympic Games
Men's track cycling
Bronze medal – third place	1924 Paris	Team pursuit
Men's road cycling
Silver medal – second place	1924 Paris	Team time trial

Fernand Saivé (24 May 1900 – 12 April 1981) was a Belgian cyclist. He competed in three events at the 1924 Summer Olympics winning a silver medal in the men's team trial and a bronze in the men's team pursuit.
