= Jean Cugnot =

French cyclist (1899–1933)

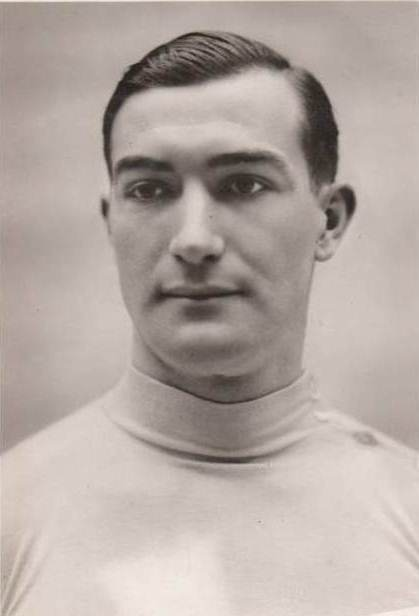

Personal information
- Full name: Jean Cugnot
- Born: 3 August 1899 Paris, France
- Died: 25 June 1933 (aged 33) Versailles, France

Cycling career
- Sport: Cycling
- Discipline: Track
- Role: Rider
Medal record
Men's track cycling
Representing France
Olympic Games
Gold medal – first place	1924 Paris	Tandem
Bronze medal – third place	1924 Paris	Individual sprint

Jean Cugnot (French: [ʒɑ̃ kyɲo]; 3 August 1899 – 25 June 1933) was a racing cyclist from France. He competed for France in the 1924 Summer Olympics held in Paris, France in the tandem event where he finished in first place and in the individual sprint event where he finished in third place.
