= Józef Lange =

Polish cyclist

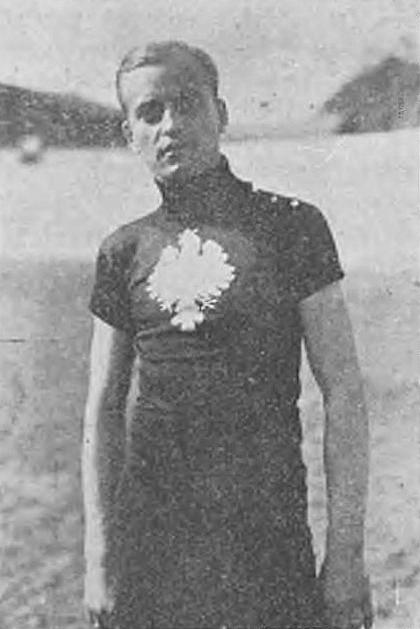

Personal information
- Born: 16 March 1897 Warsaw, Vistula Land, Russian Empire
- Died: 11 August 1972 (aged 75) Warsaw, Polish People's Republic

Cycling career
- Sport: Cycling
Medal record
Representing Poland
Olympic Games
Men's track cycling
Silver medal – second place	1924 Paris	Team pursuit

Józef Lange (16 March 1897 – 11 August 1972) was a Polish cyclist. He competed in two events at the 1924 Summer Olympics winning a silver medal in the men's team pursuit. He also competed in two events at the 1928 Summer Olympics.
