= Tomasz Stankiewicz =

Polish cyclist

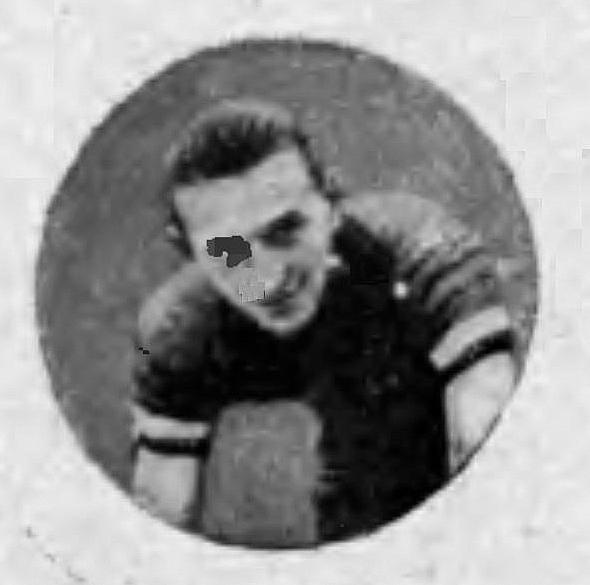

Personal information
- Full name: Tomasz Stankiewicz
- Born: 28 December 1902 Warsaw, Russian Empire
- Died: 21 June 1940 (aged 37) Palmiry, Poland

Cycling career
- Sport: Cycling
- Discipline: Track
- Role: Rider
- Rider type: Endurance
Medal record
Representing Poland
Men's track cycling
Olympic Games
Silver medal – second place	1924 Paris	Team pursuit

Tomasz Stankiewicz (28 December 1902 – 21 June 1940) was a Polish track cyclist who competed in the 1924 Summer Olympics. He was born in Warsaw and died in Palmiry, executed by Nazis.

In 1924 he won the silver as member of the Polish team in the team pursuit.
