= Éric Renaud =

French canoeist

Olympic medal record

Men's canoe sprint
Bronze medal – third place	1984 Los Angeles	C-2 1000 m

Éric Renaud (born 30 May 1961) is a French sprint canoeist who competed in the 1980s. At the 1984 Summer Olympics in Los Angeles, he won a bronze medal in the C-2 1000 m event.
