= Franciszek Szymczyk =

Polish cyclist

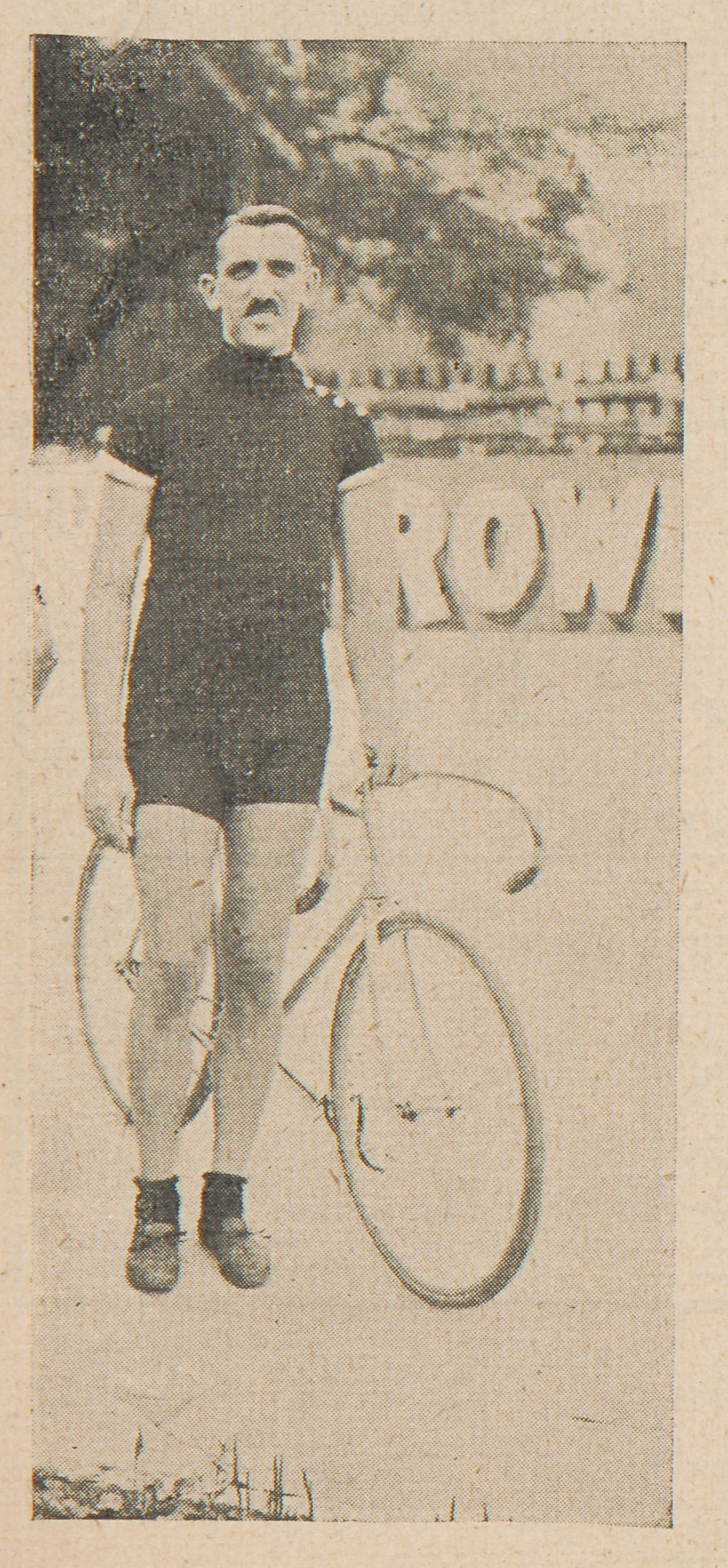
- Franciszek Szymczyk (cyclist, -1924)

Personal information
- Full name: Franciszek Szymczyk
- Born: 21 February 1892 Lemberg, Austro-Hungarian Empire (now Lviv, Ukraine)
- Died: 5 November 1976 (aged 84) Warsaw, Poland

Cycling career
- Sport: Cycling
- Discipline: Track
- Role: Rider
- Rider type: Endurance
Medal record
Representing Poland
Men's track cycling
Olympic Games
| Silver medal – second place | 1924 Paris | Team pursuit |

Franciszek Ksawery Szymczyk (21 February 1892 – 5 November 1976) was a Polish track cyclist who competed in the 1924 Summer Olympics. He was born in Lemberg and died in Warsaw.

In 1924 he won the silver as member of the Polish team in the team pursuit. He also competed in the sprint event but was eliminated in the quarter-finals.
