= Edmund Hansen (cyclist) =

Danish cyclist (1900–1995)

Personal information
- Full name: Edmund Carl Marius Møller Hansen
- Born: 9 September 1900 Odense, Denmark
- Died: 26 May 1995 (aged 94) Copenhagen, Denmark

Cycling career
- Sport: Cycling
Medal record
Men's track cycling
Representing Denmark
Olympic Games
Silver medal – second place	1924 Paris	Tandem

Edmund Carl Marius Møller Hansen (9 September 1900 – 26 May 1995) was a Danish track cyclist who won a silver medal at the 1924 Summer Olympics in the Tandem along with Willy Hansen.
