= Jan Łazarski =

Polish cyclist

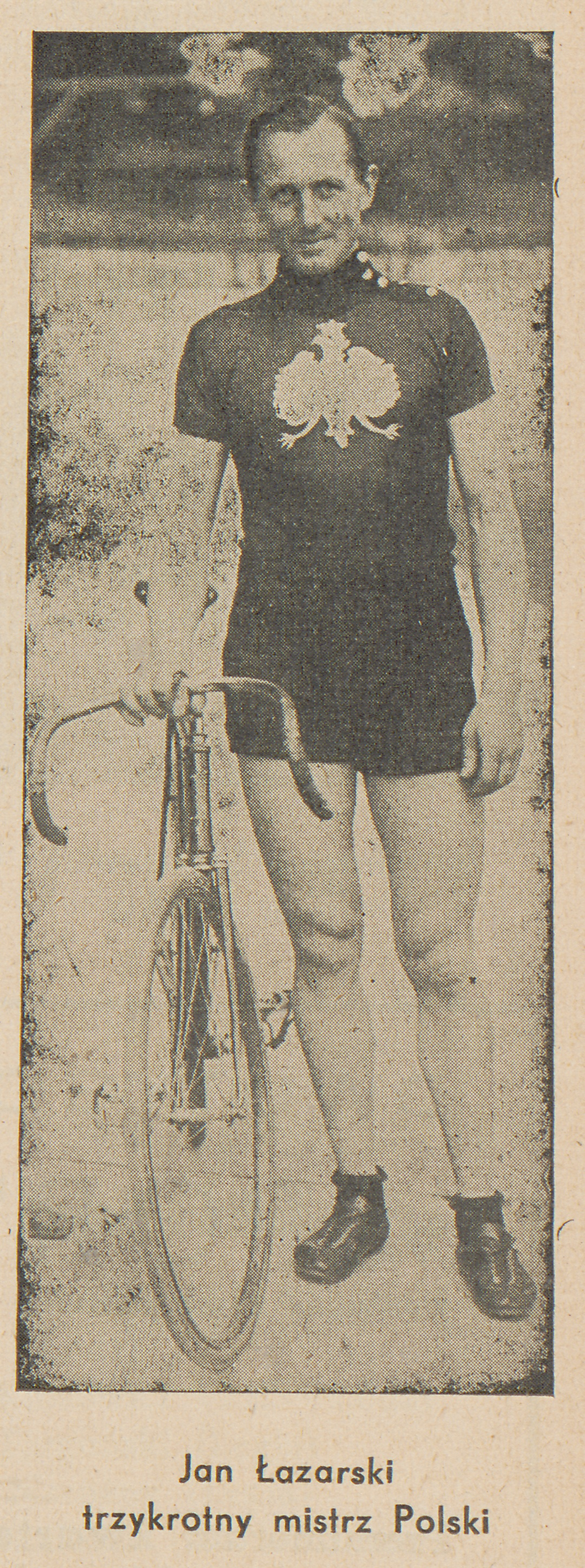
- Łazarski in 1938

Personal information
- Born: 26 October 1892 Kraków, Poland
- Died: 11 August 1968 (aged 75) Kraków, Poland

Cycling career
- Sport: Cycling
Medal record
Representing Poland
Men's track cycling
Olympic Games
Silver medal – second place	1924 Paris	Team pursuit

Jan Łazarski (26 October 1892 – 11 August 1968) was a Polish cyclist. He competed in two events at the 1924 Summer Olympics winning a silver medal in the men's team pursuit.
