= Willy Hansen =

Danish cyclist (1906–1978)

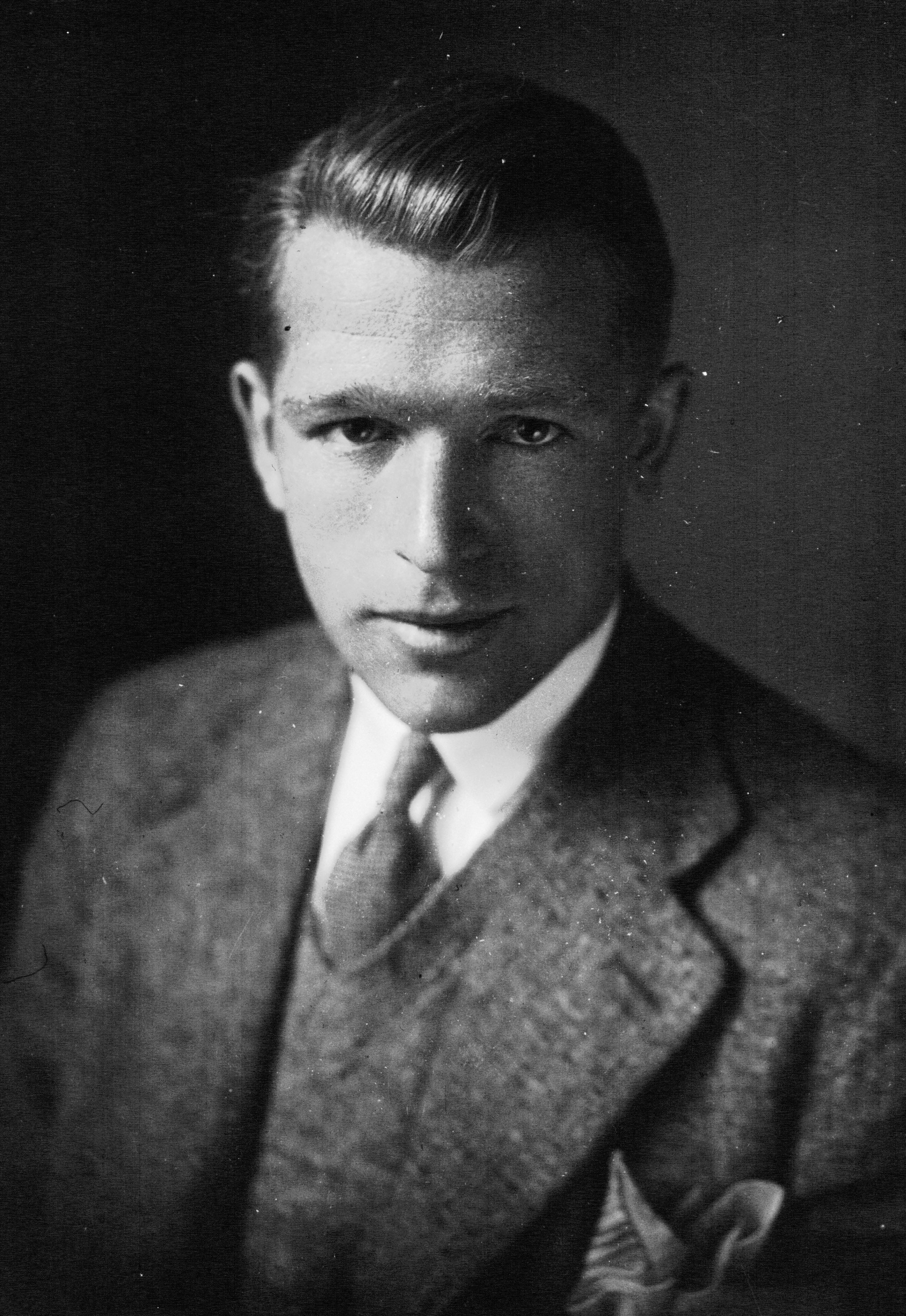

Personal information
- Full name: Willy Falck Hansen
- Born: 4 April 1906 Helsingør, Denmark
- Died: 18 March 1978 (aged 71) Braşov, Romania

Cycling career
- Sport: Cycling
- Discipline: Track
- Role: Rider
- Rider type: Sprinter
Medal record
Men's track cycling
Representing Denmark
Olympic Games
Gold medal – first place	1928 Amsterdam	1000 m time trial
Silver medal – second place	1924 Paris	Tandem
Bronze medal – third place	1928 Amsterdam	Olympic sprint
World Championships
Gold medal – first place	1931 Copenhagen	Sprint
Gold medal – first place	1928 Budapest	Amateur sprint
Silver medal – second place	1927 Cologne	Amateur sprint

Willy Falck Hansen (4 April 1906 – 18 March 1978) was a Danish track cyclist who won a silver medal at the 1924 Summer Olympics with Edmund Hansen and gold and bronze medals at the 1928 Summer Olympics.
