= Léonard Daghelinckx =

Belgian cyclist

Personal information
- Born: 10 April 1900 Antwerp, Belgium
- Died: 3 March 1986 (aged 85) Antwerp, Belgium

Cycling career
- Sport: Cycling
Medal record
Representing Belgium
Men's track cycling
Olympic Games
Bronze medal – third place	1924 Paris	Team pursuit

Léonard Daghelinckx (10 April 1900 – 3 March 1986) was a Belgian cyclist. He competed at the 1920 and 1924 Summer Olympics. At the 1924 Games, he won a bronze medal in the men's team pursuit.
