= Cycling at the 1924 Summer Olympics – Men's sprint =

Men's sprint at the Games of the VIII Olympiad
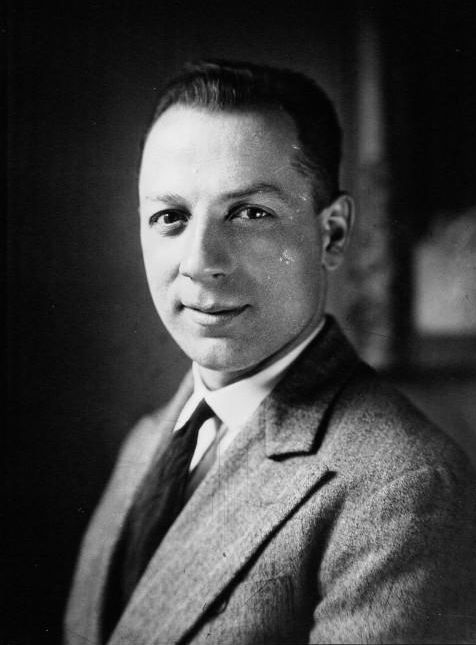
- Lucien Michard (1930)
- Venue: Vélodrome de Vincennes
- Dates: July 26–27
- Competitors: 31 from 17 nations

Medalists
1st place, gold medalist(s)		Lucien Michard; France
2nd place, silver medalist(s)		Jacob Meijer; Netherlands
3rd place, bronze medalist(s)		Jean Cugnot; France

The men's sprint event was part of the track cycling programme at the 1924 Summer Olympics. The field consisted of 31 cyclists from 17 countries. The Vélodrome de Vincennes track was a 500-metre (1,640 ft) loop. The event was won by Lucien Michard of France, the nation's third victory in the men's sprint. His teammate Jean Cugnot earned bronze. Jacob Meijer of the Netherlands took silver, putting the Dutch team on the podium for the second consecutive Games.

== Background ==
This was the fifth appearance of the event, which has been held at every Summer Olympics except 1904 and 1912. The only returning semifinalist from 1920 was gold medal winner Maurice Peeters of the Netherlands. Peeters had also won the Grand Prix de Paris in 1920. He was one of the favorites along with William Fenn of the United States and 1923 World Champion Jean Cugnot of France.

Argentina, Bulgaria, Chile, Czechoslovakia, Hungary, Latvia, Poland, and Switzerland each made their debut in the men's sprint. France made its fifth appearance, the only nation to have competed at every appearance of the event.

== Competition format ==
There were 12 first-round heats, with up to three cyclists in each. The top cyclist in each heat advanced to the quarterfinals (12 cyclists), while all other finishers went to the first repechage (18 cyclists, with one man eliminated because he did not finish his heat). In the first repechage, there were six heats of three cyclists each, with the winners advancing to the quarterfinals (6 cyclists, joining the 12 already qualified) and everyone else eliminated. The 18 quarterfinalists were divided into six heats of three cyclists each. The winner advanced directly to the semifinals (6 cyclists), while the other cyclists went to a second repechage (12 cyclists). The second repechage featured three heats of four cyclists each, with the winners advancing to the semifinals (3 cyclists, joining the 6 already qualified) and all others eliminated. The semifinals were three heats of three cyclists each, with winners advancing to the three-man final and others eliminated.

== Records ==
The records for the sprint are 200 metre flying time trial records, kept for the qualifying round in later Games as well as for the finish of races.

World record	Unknown	Unknown^{*}	Unknown	Unknown
Olympic record	Thomas Johnson (GBR)	11.8	Antwerp, Belgium	9 August 1920

^{*} World records were not tracked by the UCI until 1954.

No new Olympic record was set during the competition.

== Schedule ==
Date	Time	Round
Saturday, 26 July 1924		Round 1 First repechage
Sunday, 27 July 1924		Quarterfinals; Second repechage Semifinals; Final

== Results ==
=== Round 1 ===
The top finisher in each heat qualified for the quarterfinals. All other cyclists went to the first repechage for a second chance at quarterfinal qualifying.

==== Heat 1 ====
Rank	Cyclist	Nation	Time	Notes
1	Prudent De Bruyne	Belgium	13.8	Q
2	Eugenio Gret	Argentina		R

==== Heat 2 ====
Rank	Cyclist	Nation	Time	Notes
1	George Dempsey	Australia	13.8	Q
2	Julio Polet	Argentina		R
3	Miloš Knobloch	Czechoslovakia		R

==== Heat 3 ====
Rank	Cyclist	Nation	Time	Notes
1	Walter Coppins	Australia	13.6	Q
2	Willy Hansen	Denmark		R
3	Boris Dimchev	Bulgaria		R

==== Heat 4 ====
Rank	Cyclist	Nation	Time	Notes
1	William Fenn	United States	13.6	Q
2	Ricardo Bermejo	Chile		R
—	Maurice Gillen	Luxembourg	DNF	

==== Heat 5 ====
Rank	Cyclist	Nation	Time	Notes
1	Lucien Michard	France	13.6	Q
2	Alejandro Vidal	Chile		R

==== Heat 6 ====
Rank	Cyclist	Nation	Time	Notes
1	Herbert Fuller	Great Britain	13.8	Q
2	Holger Guldager	Denmark		R

==== Heat 7 ====
Rank	Cyclist	Nation	Time	Notes
1	Maurice Peeters	Netherlands	17.0	Q

==== Heat 8 ====
Rank	Cyclist	Nation	Time	Notes
1	Guglielmo Bossi	Italy	13.6	Q
2	János Grimm	Hungary		R
3	Oldřich Červinka	Czechoslovakia		R

==== Heat 9 ====
Rank	Cyclist	Nation	Time	Notes
1	Jacob Meijer	Netherlands	13.2	Q
2	Louis Mermillod	Switzerland		R
3	Ferenc Uhereczky	Hungary		R

==== Heat 10 ====
Rank	Cyclist	Nation	Time	Notes
1	Jean Cugnot	France	12.8	Q
2	George Owen	Great Britain		R
3	Artūrs Zeiberliņš	Latvia		R

==== Heat 11 ====
Rank	Cyclist	Nation	Time	Notes
1	Francesco Del Grosso	Italy	12.8	Q
2	Jan Łazarski	Poland		R
3	Roberts Plūme	Latvia		R

==== Heat 12 ====
Rank	Cyclist	Nation	Time	Notes
1	Franciszek Szymczyk	Poland	13.6	Q
2	Jean Verheyen	Belgium		R
3	Francisco Juillet	Chile		R

=== First repechage ===
==== First repechage heat 1 ====
Rank	Cyclist	Nation	Time	Notes
1	Willy Hansen	Denmark		Q
2	Julio Polet	Argentina		
—	Francisco Juillet	Chile	DNS	

==== First repechage heat 2 ====
Rank	Cyclist	Nation	Time	Notes
1	Miloš Knobloch	Czechoslovakia		Q
—	Boris Dimchev	Bulgaria	DNS	
—	Alejandro Vidal	Chile	DNS	

==== First repechage heat 3 ====
Rank	Cyclist	Nation	Time	Notes
1	Holger Guldager	Denmark		Q
2	Artūrs Zeiberliņš	Latvia		
3	Eugenio Gret	Argentina		

==== First repechage heat 4 ====
Rank	Cyclist	Nation	Time	Notes
1	Louis Mermillod	Switzerland		Q
2	Ferenc Uhereczky	Hungary		
3	Oldřich Červinka	Czechoslovakia		

==== First repechage heat 5 ====
Rank	Cyclist	Nation	Time	Notes
1	János Grimm	Hungary		Q
2	Ricardo Bermejo	Chile		
3	Jean Verheyen	Belgium		

==== First repechage heat 6 ====
Rank	Cyclist	Nation	Time	Notes
1	George Owen	Great Britain		Q
2	Jan Łazarski	Poland		
3	Roberts Plūme	Latvia		

=== Quarterfinals ===
The 18 winners of the first round and first repechage competed in the quarterfinals. Again, the winner of each heat advanced (this time to the semifinals) while the other cyclists competed in another repechage.

==== Quarterfinal 1 ====
Rank	Cyclist	Nation	Time	Notes
1	Jacob Meijer	Netherlands	13.2	Q
2	Willy Hansen	Denmark		R
3	Miloš Knobloch	Czechoslovakia		R

==== Quarterfinal 2 ====
Rank	Cyclist	Nation	Time	Notes
1	Lucien Michard	France	13.0	Q
2	Holger Guldager	Denmark		R
3	George Owen	Great Britain		R

==== Quarterfinal 3 ====
Rank	Cyclist	Nation	Time	Notes
1	George Dempsey	Australia	13.2	Q
2	Maurice Peeters	Netherlands		R
3	János Grimm	Hungary		R

==== Quarterfinal 4 ====
Rank	Cyclist	Nation	Time	Notes
1	Jean Cugnot	France	13.2	Q
2	William Fenn	United States		R
3	Prudent De Bruyne	Belgium		R

==== Quarterfinal 5 ====
Rank	Cyclist	Nation	Time	Notes
1	Francesco Del Grosso	Italy	13.6	Q
2	Louis Mermillod	Switzerland		R
3	Franciszek Szymczyk	Poland		R

==== Quarterfinal 6 ====
Rank	Cyclist	Nation	Time	Notes
1	Herbert Fuller	Great Britain	13.0	Q
2	Guglielmo Bossi	Italy		R
3	Walter Coppins	Australia		R

=== Second repechage ===
==== Second repechage heat 1 ====
Rank	Cyclist	Nation	Time	Notes
1	Guglielmo Bossi	Italy		Q
2	Maurice Peeters	Netherlands		
3	Willy Hansen	Denmark		
4	Miloš Knobloch	Czechoslovakia		

==== Second repechage heat 2 ====
Rank	Cyclist	Nation	Time	Notes
1	Louis Mermillod	Switzerland		Q
2	Prudent De Bruyne	Belgium		
3	János Grimm	Hungary		
4	George Owen	Great Britain		

==== Second repechage heat 3 ====
Rank	Cyclist	Nation	Time	Notes
1	Holger Guldager	Denmark		Q
2	William Fenn	United States		
3	Walter Coppins	Australia		
—	Franciszek Szymczyk	Poland	DNS	

=== Semifinals ===
The nine remaining cyclists competed in three semifinals, with the winners advancing to the finals and the losers eliminated.

==== Semifinal 1 ====
Rank	Cyclist	Nation	Time	Notes
1	Lucien Michard	France	12.2	Q
2	Herbert Fuller	Great Britain		
3	Guglielmo Bossi	Italy		

==== Semifinal 2 ====
Rank	Cyclist	Nation	Time	Notes
1	Jacob Meijer	Netherlands	12.8	Q
2	Holger Guldager	Denmark		
3	Francesco Del Grosso	Italy		

==== Semifinal 3 ====
Rank	Cyclist	Nation	Time	Notes
1	Jean Cugnot	France	12.2	Q
2	George Dempsey	Australia		
3	Louis Mermillod	Switzerland		

=== Final ===
The final three cyclists competed for the three medals.

Rank	Cyclist	Nation	Time
1st place, gold medalist(s)	Lucien Michard	France	12.8
2nd place, silver medalist(s)	Jacob Meijer	Netherlands	
3rd place, bronze medalist(s)	Jean Cugnot	France	
