= Cycling at the 1924 Summer Olympics – Men's 50 kilometres =

Men's 50 kilometres at the Games of the VIII Olympiad
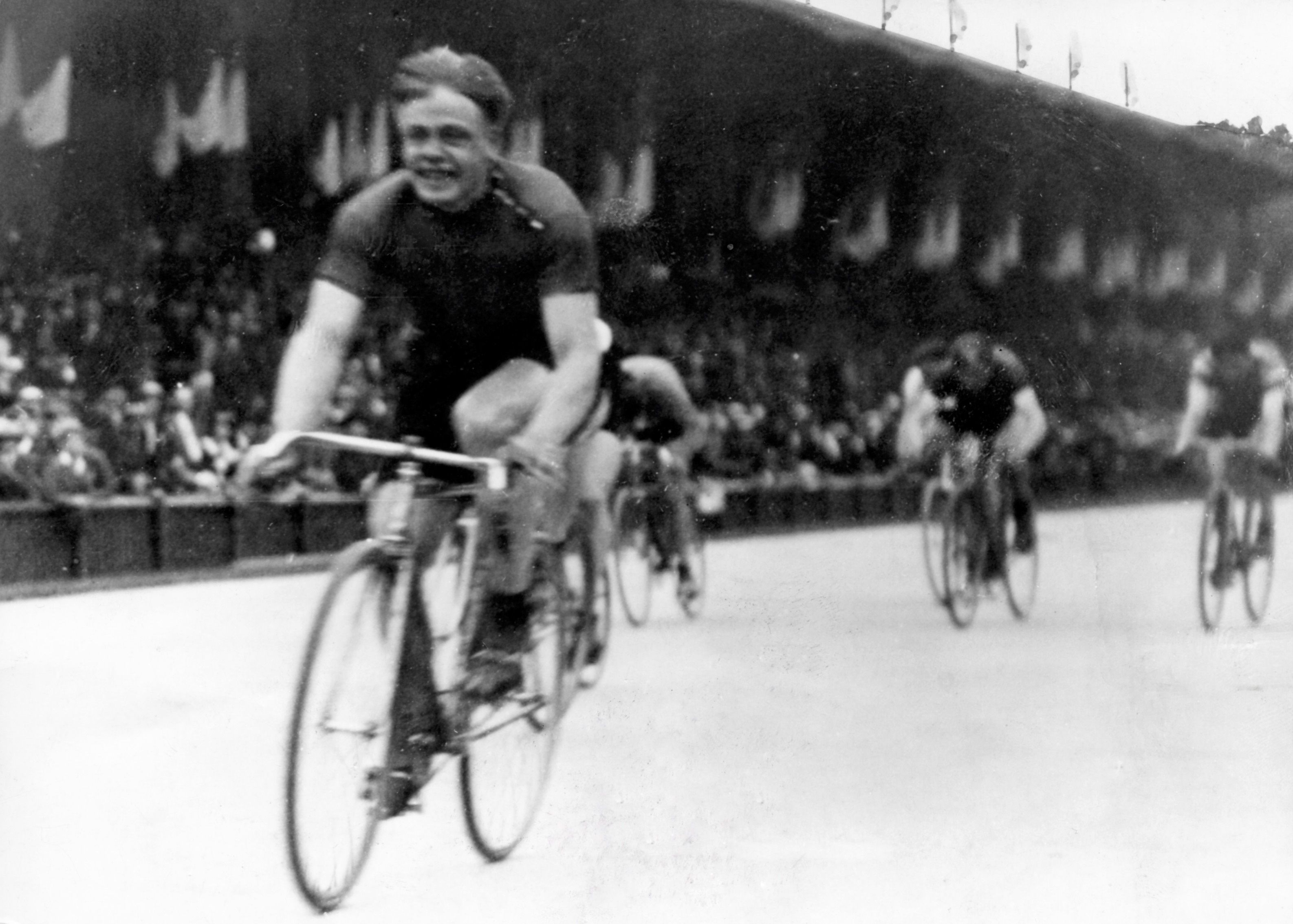
- finish of the men's 50 kilometres
- Venue: Vélodrome de Vincennes
- Date: July 27
- Competitors: 37 from 16 nations

Medalists
1st place, gold medalist(s)		Ko Willems	Netherlands
2nd place, silver medalist(s)		Cyril Alden	Great Britain
3rd place, bronze medalist(s)		Harry Wyld	Great Britain

Video

The men's 50 kilometres event was part of the track cycling programme at the 1924 Summer Olympics.

The field consisted of 37 cyclists from 16 countries. The Vélodrome de Vincennes track was a 500-metre (1,640 ft) loop. Each cyclist had to complete 100 laps. Cyril Alden finished second for the second straight Olympics.

The Dutch team was represented by two cyclists, Ko Willems and Jan Maas (who was a late replacement for Jonkheer Bosch van Drakenstein). Their tactic was that Maas would attack, so that the other cyclists would be tired, after which Willems, the better sprinter, could win the race.

As planned, Maas attacked from the tenth kilometer. The other cyclists spent energy, getting him back, while Willems could cycle along and save his energy. Five loops before the finish, every looped cyclist had to exit the race, and only 15 cyclists remained, including Maas and Willems. In the last loop, the sprint started, with Wyld, Alden and De Martino. Willems went around them, and 100 m from the finish, all four men were next to each other. Willems was faster than the others, so he won the race.

== Results ==
Placings are known for only the top seven finishers. Only Willems's time is known.

Place	Cyclist	Time
1st place, gold medalist(s)	Ko Willems (NED)	1:18:24.0
2nd place, silver medalist(s)	Cyril Alden (GBR)	
3rd place, bronze medalist(s)	Harry Wyld (GBR)	
4	Angelo de Martino (ITA)	
5	Józef Lange (POL)	
6	Alfredo Dinale (ITA)	
7	Johannes Maas (NED)	
8–36	Mohamed Ali Mahmoud (EGY)	
8–36	Ricardo Bermejo (CHI)	
8–36	Josef Boons (BEL)	
8–36	Robert Broadbent (AUS)	
8–36	Jaroslav Brož (TCH)	
8–36	Charles Cadron (BEL)	
8–36	Lucien Choury (FRA)	
8–36	Walter Coppins (AUS)	
8–36	Léonard Daghelinckx (BEL)	
8–36	Luis de Meyer (ARG)	
8–36	Francesco Del Grosso (ITA)	
8–36	George Dempsey (AUS)	
8–36	William Fenn (USA)	
8–36	Prodan Georgiev (BUL)	
8–36	Eugenio Gret (ARG)	
8–36	Ignatius Gronkowski (USA)	
8–36	Edmund Hansen (DEN)	
8–36	Ahmed Salem Hassan (EGY)	
8–36	Francisco Juillet (CHI)	
8–36	Henry Kaltenbrunn (RSA)	
8–36	Joe Laporte (CAN)	
8–36	Jan Łazarski (POL)	
8–36	Mohamed Madkour (EGY)	
8–36	Édouard Meunier (FRA)	
8–36	Julio Polet (ARG)	
8–36	Cosme Saavedra (ARG)	
8–36	Borislav Stoyanov (BUL)	
8–36	Jean Verheyen (BEL)	
8–36	Alejandro Vidal (CHI)	
–	Willy Hansen (DEN)	Did not finish
