= Deaths in October 1993 =

The following is a list of notable deaths in October 1993.

Entries for each day are listed alphabetically by surname. A typical entry lists information in the following sequence:

- Name, age, country of citizenship at birth, subsequent country of citizenship (if applicable), reason for notability, cause of death (if known), and reference.

== October 1993 ==
=== 1 ===
- Karl Bach, 72, German Olympic fencer (1952).
- Fran Bošnjaković, 91, Croatian engineer and thermodynamicist.
- Segundo Castillo, 80, Peruvian footballer and Olympian (1936).
- André Corriveau, 65, Canadian ice hockey player (Montreal Canadiens).
- Janine Darcey, 76, French film actress.
- Raymond Bryan Dillard, 49, American theologian and biblical scholar, heart attack.
- Božo Janković, 42, Yugoslav football player.
- Sigurð Joensen, 82, Faroese lawyer, author, and politician.
- Polly Klaas, 12, American murder victim, strangulation.
- M. Vera Peters, 82, Canadian oncologist, breast cancer.
- Hermann Otto Sleumer, 87, Dutch botanist.
- Bob Standfield, 78, Australian rules footballer.
- Giuseppe Vari, 69, Italian film director, editor and screenwriter.

=== 2 ===
- Ahmed Abdul-Malik, 66, American jazz double bassist and oud player.
- William Berger, 65, Austrian-American actor, cancer.
- Henry Ringling North, 83, American businessman and circus owner.
- Ángel Riveras, 85, Spanish Olympic sailor (1968).
- Amin Tarif, 95, Israeli Druze religious leader.

=== 3 ===
- Paul Daxhelet, 87, Belgian painter.
- Katerina Gogou, 53, Greek poet, author and actress, suicide.
- Gary Gordon, 33, American Army master sergeant and recipient of the Medal of Honor, killed in action.
- Mihály Korom, 65, Hungarian politician and jurist.
- Patricia Lake, 74, American actress, radio comedian, and socialite.
- Rory Peck, 36, Northern-Irish freelance war cameraman, shot.
- Randy Shughart, 35, American Army Delta Force soldier and recipient of the Medal of Honor, killed in action.
- Hans-Dieter Wacker, 34, German footballer.

=== 4 ===
- Josh Ashton, 44, American football player (New England Patriots, St. Louis Cardinals).
- John Cawas, 83, Indian actor and stuntman.
- Varetta Dillard, 60, American rhythm and blues singer.
- Jim Holton, 42, Scottish football player, heart attack.
- William Henry Scott, 72, American teacher and historian.
- Lorie Tarshis, 82, Canadian economist.

=== 5 ===
- Graeme Bean, 45, Australian rules footballer.
- Francesco Carpino, 88, Italian Roman Catholic Cardinal and Archbishop.
- Willard A. Hanna, 82, American writer.
- Karl Gordon Henize, 66, American astronomer and astronaut (STS-51-F), heart attack
- Radhu Karmakar, 74, Indian cinematographer and film director.
- Jane Nigh, 68, American actress, stroke.
- Mircea Socolescu, 91, Romanian Olympic bobsledder (1928).
- Dumitru Stăniloae, 89, Romanian Orthodox Christian priest and theologian.

=== 6 ===
- Sergei Babkov, 72, Soviet and Russian painter.
- Albert Bigelow, 87, American writer and pacifist.
- Ray Broussard, 56, American thoroughbred horse racing jockey.
- Andrew A. Caffrey, 73, American district judge (United States District Court for the District of Massachusetts).
- Stillman Drake, 82, Canadian historian and academic.
- Nejat Eczacıbaşı, 80, Turkish industrialist and philanthropist
- Victor Razafimahatratra, 72, Malagasy Roman Catholic cardinal.

=== 7 ===
- Ivor Bulmer-Thomas, 87, British journalist and scientific writer.
- Eddie Burke, 86, Canadian ice hockey player (Boston Bruins, New York Americans).
- Cyril Cusack, 82, Irish actor (Nineteen Eighty-Four, Harold and Maude, My Left Foot), complications from amyotrophic lateral sclerosis.
- Agnes de Mille, 88, American dancer and choreographer, stroke.
- Kenneth Nelson, 63, American actor (The Boys in the Band, Hellraiser, Seventeen).

=== 8 ===
- Gu Cheng, 37, Chinese poet, essayist and novelist, suicide.
- Pete Cooper, 78, American golfer.
- Wal Lambert, 77, Australian Olympic rower (1948).
- Santiago Navarro, 56, Spanish Olympic basketball player (1960).
- Manke Nelis, 73, Dutch levenslied singer.
- Roy Scholl, 89, American football player.
- Alfred Toepfer, 99, German entrepreneur.

=== 9 ===
- Leopold Facco, 85, Austrian footballer.
- Bernard J. Ganter, 65, American prelate of the Roman Catholic Church.
- Harry Jagielski, 61, American gridiron football player.
- Sachiko Murase, 88, Japanese actress.
- Göta Pettersson, 66, Swedish gymnast and Olympian (1948, 1952).
- C. R. Rangachari, 77, Indian cricket player.

=== 10 ===
- John Bindon, 50, English actor and bodyguard, cancer.
- Catherine Collard, 46, French classical pianist, cancer.
- Jim Howden, 59, Australian rower and Olympian (1956), cancer.
- Keith Murray, Baron Murray of Newhaven, 90, British academic.

=== 11 ===
- Joe Barzda, 78, American racing driver.
- Nani Bhattacharya, 75, Indian trade union activist and politician.
- Alexandra Hay, 46, American actress.
- Yvar Mikhashoff, 52, American pianist and composer, AIDS-related complications.
- Emmett O'Neill, 75, American baseball player (Boston Red Sox, Chicago Cubs, Chicago White Sox).
- Andy Stewart, 59, Scottish musician, heart attack.
- Jess Thomas, 66, American operatic tenor.
- Lee Walls, 60, American baseball player.
- Annemarie Werner-Hansen, 54, Danish Olympic canoeist (1960, 1964).

=== 12 ===
- Leon Ames, 91, American actor (Meet Me in St. Louis, Tora! Tora! Tora!, Mister Ed), stroke.
- Mircea David, 78, Romanian football player.
- Lawrence R. Hafstad, 89, American electrical engineer and physicist.
- Ruth Gilbert, 81, American actress, brain cancer.
- Patrick Holt, 81, English actor.
- Myrtle Lind, 95, American film actress.
- Paul Podmajersky, 76, American football player (Chicago Bears).
- V. Subbiah, 82, Indian communist politician.
- Rhys Thomson, 75, Canadian ice hockey player (Montreal Canadiens, Toronto Maple Leafs).
- Pendekanti Venkatasubbaiah, 72, Indian politician.

=== 13 ===
- Tekin Arıburun, 88, Turkish soldier and statesman.
- Espectro I, 54, Mexican luchador known as "El Espectro I" ("The Ghost").
- Wade Flemons, 53, American soul singer, cancer.
- Otmar Gutmann, 56, German filmmaker, cancer.
- John G. Jackson, 86, American lecturer, teacher and writer.
- D. Bailey Merrill, 80, American politician, member of the United States House of Representatives (1953-1955).
- Gwen Welles, 42, American actress (Nashville), cancer.

=== 14 ===
- Joseph S. Ammerman, 69, American politician, member of the United States House of Representatives (1977-1979).
- Nikolay Baskakov, 75, Soviet and Russian painter.
- Bertie Clarke, 75, Barbadian cricket player.
- Harald Hennum, 65, Norwegian football player.
- Roy Hurley, 71, American basketball player (Tri-Cities Blackhawks, Syracuse Nationals).
- Hirohide Ishida, 78, Japanese politician.
- Chen Hsiao-nan, 85, Chinese painter.
- Eruch Mistry, 70-71, Indian Olympic cyclist (1948).
- Walter Newman, 77, American radio writer and screenwriter.
- Venmani S. Selvanather, 80, Indian prelate of the Roman Catholic Church.
- Obert C. Tanner, 89, American businessman and philanthropist.

=== 15 ===
- Herbert Fuller, 90, British Olympic cyclist (1924).
- Clarence Lung, 78, American actor.
- Bert McInenly, 87, Canadian ice hockey player.
- Aydın Sayılı, 80, Turkish historian of science.
- Dan Turèll, 47, Danish writer, esophageal cancer.
- Satosi Watanabe, 83, Japanese theoretical physicist.

=== 16 ===
- Horace Debenham, 90, British Olympic rower (1924).
- Jimmie DeShong, 83, American baseball player (Philadelphia Athletics, New York Yankees, Washington Senators).
- Flora Nwapa, 62, Nigerian author, pneumonia.
- Arnie Oliver, 86, American soccer player.
- Bonnie Poe, 81, American actress and voice artist.
- René Sylviano, 89, French composer.

=== 17 ===
- Syed Mohammad Ali, 64, Bangladeshi journalist and editor.
- Vijay Bhatt, 86, Indian film director and screenwriter.
- Helmut Gollwitzer, 84, German Lutheran theologian and author.
- Gordon Grieve, 81, New Zealand politician.
- Ante Krnčević, 84, Yugoslavian Olympic rower (1936).
- Philip Monk, 86, New Zealand cricketer and soldier.
- Criss Oliva, 30, American musician, traffic collision.
- Bill Reigel, 61, American basketball player and coach.

=== 18 ===
- Bernd Baselt, 59, German musicologist.
- Maria Rosa Candido, 26, Italian short track speed skater and Olympian (1988, 1992), traffic collision.
- Adrian Hearn, 73, Australian rules footballer.
- Lois Kibbee, 71, American actress (The Edge of Night, Caddyshack, One Life to Live), brain cancer.
- Salvador P. Lopez, 82, Filipino writer, journalist, diplomat and statesman.

=== 19 ===
- Gidske Anderson, 71, Norwegian journalist and author.
- Pola Illéry, 83, Romanian-American actress and singer.
- John Kerr, 94, American baseball player (Detroit Tigers, Chicago White Sox, Washington Senators).
- Carsta Löck, 90, German film actress.
- Johnny Lucas, 62, Luxembourgian Olympic canoeist (1952).
- Lucien J. Maciora, 91, American politician, member of the United States House of Representatives (1941-1943).

=== 20 ===
- Aage Dons, 90, Danish author.
- Gaylord DuBois, 94, American comic book writer.
- Milan Konjović, 95, Serbian painter.
- Martti Matilainen, 86, Finnish Olympic runner (1932, 1936).
- Bob Olderman, 31, American gridiron football player (Kansas City Chiefs).
- Yasushi Sugiyama, 84, Japanese painter.

=== 21 ===
- Wayne Belardi, 63, American baseball player (Brooklyn Dodgers, Detroit Tigers).
- James Leo Herlihy, 66, American author (Midnight Cowboy) and playwright, suicide.
- Bob Hunter, 80, American sportswriter.
- Moritz Inderbitzin, 72, Swiss Olympic wrestler (1948).
- Gabby Kemp, 74, American baseball player and manager.
- Jan Maciejko, 80, Polish ice hockey player and Olympian (1948).
- Jan Meijer, 72, Dutch Olympic sprinter (1948).
- Melchior Ndadaye, 40, Burundian intellectual and politician, murdered.
- Annie Thayyil, 74, Indian novelist, journalist, and biographer.
- Irv Torgoff, 76, American basketball player, heart attack.
- Ștefan Zoller, 79, Romanian Olympic handball player (1936).
- Sam Zolotow, 94, American theater critic, stomach cancer.

=== 22 ===
- Jiří Hájek, 80, Czech politician and diplomat.
- Innes Ireland, 63, British military officer and racing driver, cancer.
- Said Mohamed Jaffar, 75, President of Comoros (1975–1976).
- Luis Felipe Ramón y Rivera, 80, Venezuelan musician, composer and writer.
- Frederick Stanley, 69, New Zealand cricketer.
- Hans Walter Wolff, 81, German protestant theologian.

=== 23 ===
- Thomas Begley, 22, Northern Irish IRA Volunteer, bomb explosion.
- Ulf Björlin, 60, Swedish composer and conductor.
- Marv Blaylock, 64, American baseball player (New York Giants, Philadelphia Phillies).
- Friedrich Dickel, 79, German politician.
- Wilhelm Feldberg, 92, German-British physiologist and biologist.
- Shota Lomidze, 57, Soviet Georgian Olympic wrestler (1964, 1968).
- John Wells, 70, American baseball player (Brooklyn Dodgers).
- Steve Wylie, 82, American baseball player.

=== 24 ===
- Johnnie Cowan, 80, American baseball player.
- Jo Grimond, 80, British politician.
- Přemysl Hajný, 67, Czechoslovak ice hockey player and Olympian (1948).
- Hajibaba Huseynov, 74, Soviet and Azerbaijani poet and pedagogue.
- Fritz Jüptner-Jonstorff, 85, Austrian art director.
- Heinz Kubsch, 63, German football goalkeeper.
- Tonino Nardi, 54, Italian film cinematographer.
- Elena Nicolai, 88, Bulgarian operatic mezzo-soprano.

=== 25 ===
- Danny Chan, 35, Hong Kong singer, songwriter, records producer and actor.
- Mariya Kapnist, 80, Soviet and Ukrainian actress, complications following car accident.
- Josef Losert, 85, Austrian Olympic fencer (1936).
- Roy Hampton Park, 83, American media executive and entrepreneur.
- Vincent Price, 82, American actor (House of Wax, The Fly, Edward Scissorhands), lung cancer.

=== 26 ===
- Maurice Henry Dorman, 81, British diplomat and colonial administrator.
- František Filipovský, 86, Czechoslovak actor.
- Albert Hyzler, 76, Maltese politician and President of Malta.
- Joe Krol, 78, Canadian ice hockey player (New York Rangers, Brooklyn Americans).
- Oro, 21, Mexican professional wrestler, wrestling accident.
- Harold Rome, 85, American composer, lyricist, and musical writer.
- Mušan Topalović, 36, Bosnian gangster and warlord, killed.
- Albert Zugsmith, 83, American film producer, film director and screenwriter.

=== 27 ===
- Earl Banks, 69, American gridiron football player and coach, car accident.
- Cloyce Box, 70, American gridiron football player (Detroit Lions).
- David Lawrence McKay, 92, American Mormon leader.
- Peter Quennell, 88, English writer, biographer, and literary historian.
- Peter Tizard, 77, British paediatrician and university professor.

=== 28 ===
- Emilio Berio, 88, Italian entomologist and lawyer.
- Doris Duke, 80, American heiress, philanthropist, art collector, and socialite, edema.
- Cal Koonce, 52, American baseball player (Chicago Cubs, New York Mets, Boston Red Sox), lymphoma.
- Juri Lotman, 71, Russian-Estonian literary scholar, semiotician, and historian.
- Bob Seeds, 86, American baseball player.

=== 29 ===
- Lipman Bers, 79, Latvian-American mathematician.
- Robert P. Dilworth, 78, American mathematician.
- Herbert Lütkebohmert, 45, German football player.
- Masahiro Makino, 85, Japanese film director.
- Stanisław Marusarz, 80, Polish Nordic skiing competitor and Olympian (1932, 1936, 1948, 1952).
- Anse Moore, 76, American baseball player (Detroit Tigers).
- Edie Parker, 71, American author and first wife of writer Jack Kerouac.
- Zdeněk Podskalský, 70, Czech film director and screenwriter.
- George Pope, 82, English cricket player.
- Ewald Riebschläger, 89, German diver and Olympian (1928).
- Elliot Scott, 78, English production designer (Who Framed Roger Rabbit, Labyrinth, Indiana Jones and the Last Crusade).
- František Tokár, 68, Czechoslovak table tennis player.
- Roger Turner, 92, American figure skater and Olympian (1928, 1932).

=== 30 ===
- Donald Prentice Booth, 90, American Army general.
- Paul Grégoire, 82, Canadian Roman Catholic cardinal, stomach cancer.
- Louis B. Heller, 88, American lawyer and politician, member of the United States House of Representatives (1949-1954).
- Peter Kemp, 78, English soldier and writer.
- Maria Matray, 86, German screenwriter and film actress.
- Margaret Vyner, 78, Australian-British model and actress.
- Ted Williams, 77, American gridiron football player (Philadelphia Eagles).

=== 31 ===
- Bob Atcher, 79, American country musician.
- Federico Fellini, 73, Italian film director and screenwriter (8½, La Dolce Vita, La Strada), four-time Oscar winner, heart attack.
- Al Mello, 87, American Olympic boxer (1924).
- Lajos Papp, 49, Hungarian sport shooter and Olympian (1968, 1972, 1976).
- River Phoenix, 23, American actor (Running on Empty, Stand by Me, Indiana Jones and the Last Crusade) and musician, drug overdose.
- Gilman Rankin, 82, American actor (Midnight Cowboy, Tombstone Territory, Assault on Precinct 13).
- Edwin Walker, 83, American Army officer, anti-communist, and white supremacist, lung cancer.
