= Chile at the 1924 Summer Olympics =

- IOC code: CHI
- NOC: Chilean Olympic Committee

in Paris
- Flag bearer: Manuel Plaza
- Medals: Gold 0 Silver 0 Bronze 0 Total 0

Summer Olympics appearances (overview)
- ~~1896~~; 1900–1908; 1912; 1920; 1924; 1928; 1932; 1936; 1948; 1952; 1956; 1960; 1964; 1968; 1972; 1976; 1980; 1984; 1988; 1992; 1996; 2000; 2004; 2008; 2012; 2016; 2020; 2024; 2028

Chile at the 1924 Summer Olympics in Paris, France was the nation's fourth appearance out of seven editions of the Summer Olympic Games.

== Athletics ==
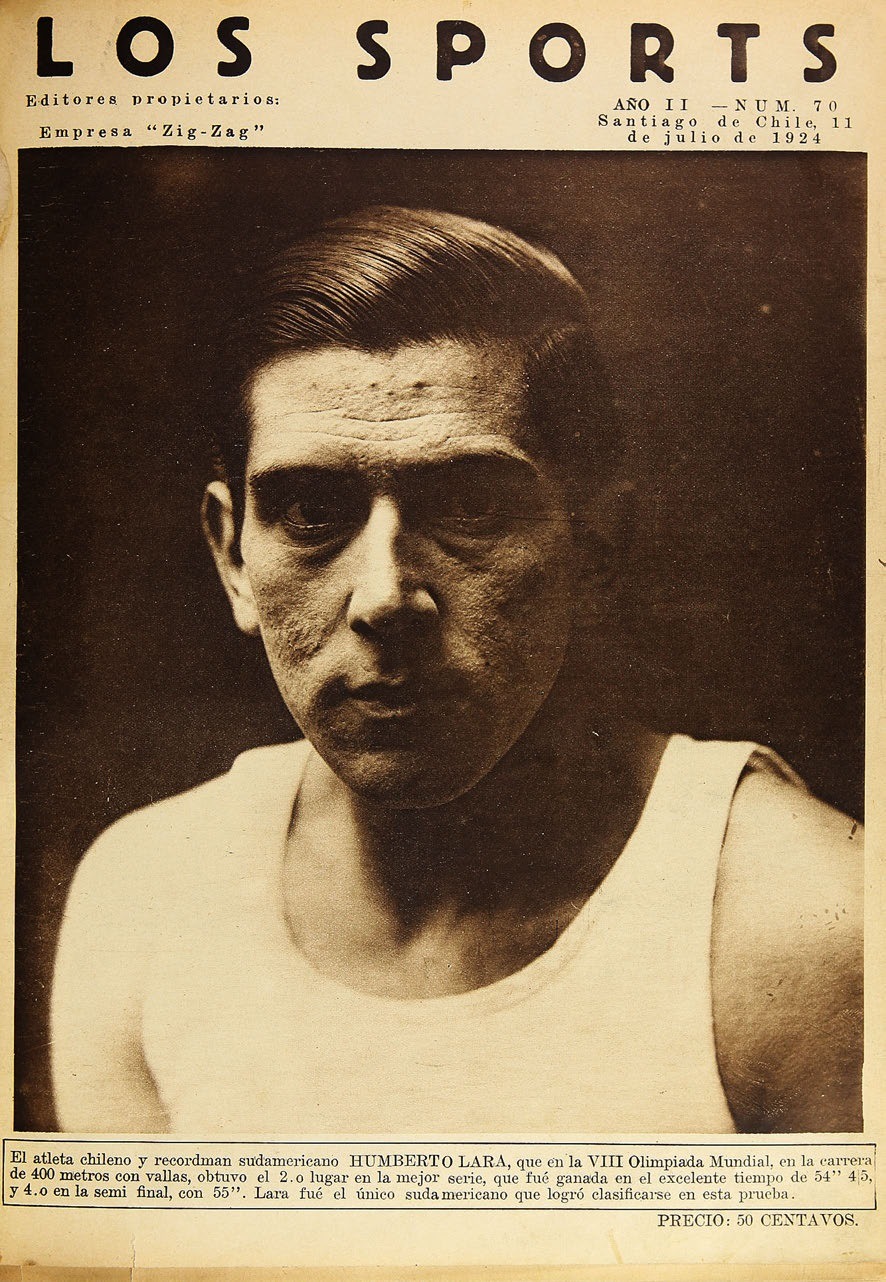
Humbert Lara in the front cover of Chilean magazine Los Sports.

Three athletes represented Chile in 1924. It was the nation's fourth appearance in the sport.

Ranks given are within the heat.

Athlete	Event	Heats		Quarterfinals		Semifinals		Final	
Athlete	Event	Result	Rank	Result	Rank	Result	Rank	Result	Rank
Humberto Lara	400 m hurdles	N/A		56.5	2 Q	59.0	6	did not advance	
Manuel Plaza	Marathon	N/A						2:52:54.0	6
Alfredo Ugarte	110 m hurdles	N/A		Unknown	3	did not advance			

== Boxing ==
Four boxers represented Chile at the 1924 Games. It was the nation's debut in the sport. Abarca was the most successful boxer, advancing to the quarterfinals. The other three boxers each lost their first bout.

Boxer	Weight class	Round of 32	Round of 16	Quarterfinals	Semifinals	Final / Bronze match	
Boxer	Weight class	Opposition Score	Opposition Score	Opposition Score	Opposition Score	Opposition Score	Rank
Carlos Abarca	Featherweight	Bergman (SWE); W	Bautista (ESP); W	Fields (USA); L	did not advance		5
Luis Correa	Light heavyweight	Rossignon (FRA); L	did not advance				17
Zorobabel Rodríguez	Lightweight	Nielsen (DEN); L	did not advance				17
Carlos Usaveaga	Bantamweight	Tripoli (USA); L	did not advance				17

Opponent nation	Wins	Losses	Percent
Denmark	0	1	.000
France	0	1	.000
Spain	1	0	.000
Sweden	1	0	.000
United States	0	2	.000
Total	2	4	.333

Round	Wins	Losses	Percent
Round of 32	1	3	.250
Round of 16	1	0	1.000
Quarterfinals	0	1	.000
Semifinals	0	0	–
Final	0	0	–
Bronze match	0	0	–
Total	2	4	.333

== Cycling ==
Three cyclists represented Chile in 1924. It was the nation's second appearance in the sport.

=== Track cycling ===
Ranks given are within the heat.

Cyclist	Event	First round		First repechage		Quarterfinals		Second repechage		Semifinals		Final	
Cyclist	Event	Result	Rank	Result	Rank	Result	Rank	Result	Rank	Result	Rank	Result	Rank
Ricardo Bermejo	50 km	N/A										Unknown	8–36
Ricardo Bermejo	Sprint	Unknown	2 r	Unknown	2	did not advance							
F. R. Juillet	50 km	N/A										Unknown	8–36
F. R. Juillet	Sprint	Unknown	3 r	did not start		did not advance							
Alejandro Vidal	50 km	N/A										Unknown	8–36
Alejandro Vidal	Sprint	Unknown	2 r	did not start		did not advance							

== Fencing ==
A single, male, fencer represented Chile in 1924. It was the nation's debut in the sport.

Men

Ranks given are within the pool.

Fencer	Event	Round 1		Round 2		Quarterfinals		Semifinals		Final	
Fencer	Event	Result	Rank	Result	Rank	Result	Rank	Result	Rank	Result	Rank
Rafael Fernández	Sabre	N/A				2–3	5	did not advance			

== Tennis ==
Men

Athlete	Event	Round of 128	Round of 64	Round of 32	Round of 16	Quarterfinals	Semifinals	Final	
Athlete	Event	Opposition Score	Opposition Score	Opposition Score	Opposition Score	Opposition Score	Opposition Score	Opposition Score	Rank
Domingo Torralva	Singles	Flaquer (ESP); L 4–6, 6–3, 0–6, 0–6	did not advance						
Luis Torralva	Singles	Bye	Borotra (FRA); L 7–9, 5–7, 5–7	did not advance					
Domingo Torralva; Luis Torralva	Doubles	—N/a	Roman / Lupu (ROU); W 7–5, 6–2, 6–3	Condon / Richardson (RSA); L 2–6, 1–6, 6–4, 2–6	did not advance				
