= Brož =

Brož (feminine: Brožová) is a Czech surname, derived from the given name Ambrož (Czech variant of Ambrose). A similar surname with the same origin is Brožek. Notable people with the surname include:

- Antonín Brož (born 1987), Czech luger
- František Brož (1896–1952), Czech violist and conductor
- František Brož (athlete) (1929–2018), Czech athlete
- Gisela Brož (1865–1944), Austrian-American circus performer
- Jaroslav Brož (cyclist) (1906–1953), Czech cyclist
- Jaroslav Brož (long jumper) (1950–1975), Czech athlete
- Kateřina Brožová (born 1968), Czech actress and singer
- Lukáš Brož (born 1985), Czech luger
- Michal Brož (born 1992), Czech athlete

== See also ==
- Broz, a Croatian surname
- Ludmila Brožová-Polednová (1921–2015), Czech communist prosecutor
- 16244 Brož, an asteroid named after Czech celestial mechanician Miroslav Brož
