= Brozek =

Brozek may refer to:

- Brożek, a village in Poland
- Brożek (surname), a Polish surname
- Brožek, a Czech surname
- Jennifer Brozek (born 1970), American writer
