= T. Allston Brown =

American historian

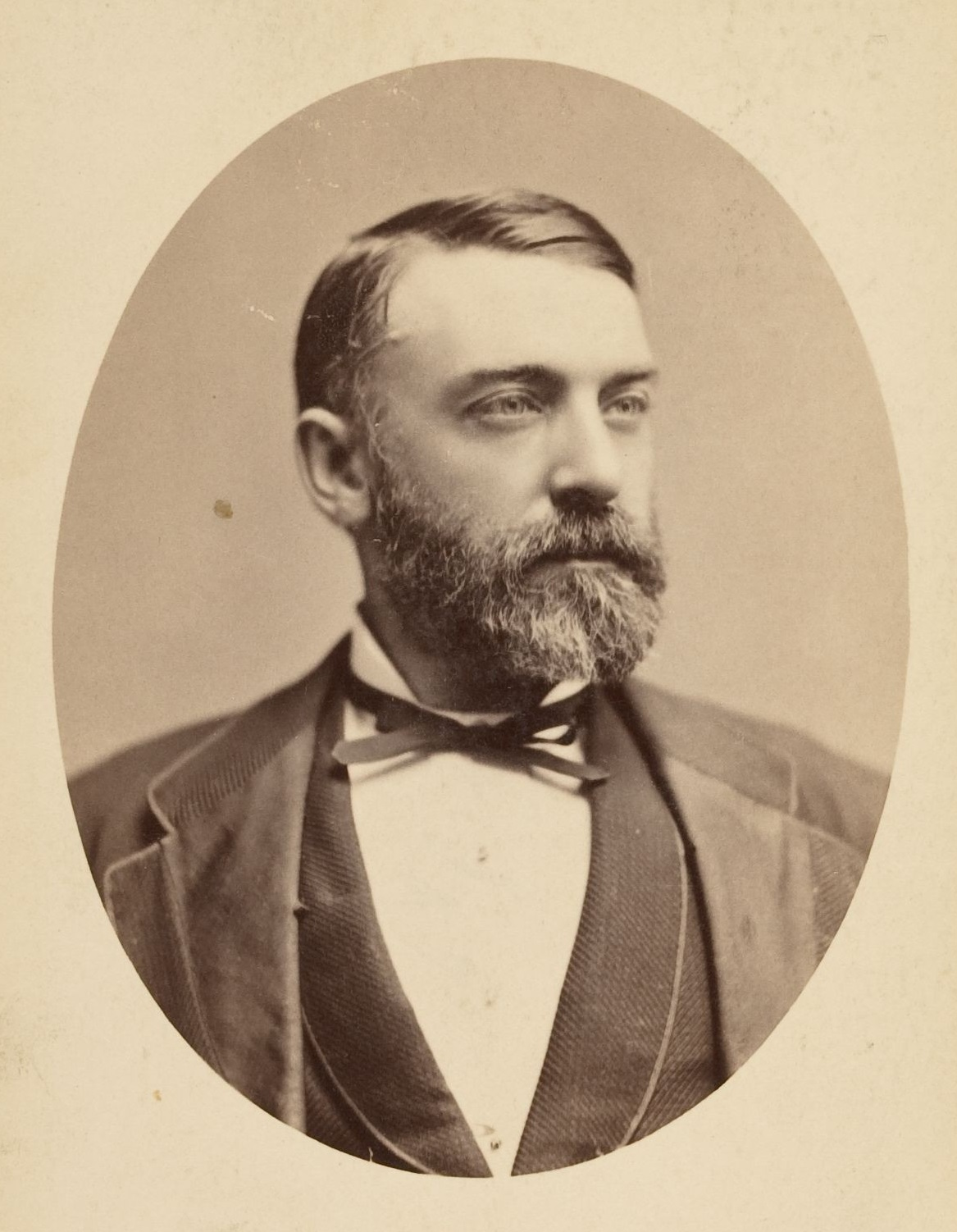
- Born: Thomas Allston Brown; January 16, 1836; Newburyport, Massachusetts
- Died: April 2, 1918 (aged 82); Philadelphia, Pennsylvania
- Other name: Allston Brown
- Occupations: Theater critic, newspaper editor, talent agent and theater historian

Thomas Allston Brown (January 16, 1836 – April 2, 1918) was an American theater critic, newspaper editor, talent agent and manager, and theater historian, best known for his books, History of the American Stage (Dick & Fitzgerald: New York, 1870) and A History of the New York Stage from the First Performance in 1732 to 1901 (Dodd Mead: New York, 1902).

== Life and career ==
Brown was born in Newburyport, Massachusetts, to Thomas James Brown (1800–1867) and Lucretia Hamsly Brown (née Lucretia Hamsly Milton; 1810–1872). He began his career as the Philadelphia correspondent and theater critic for the top entertainment journal of the time, the New York Clipper. He freelanced for other show-business publications and published his own paper, called The Tattler.

In 1860, Brown entered show business as the advance man for the Cooper English Opera Company, managed by virtuoso violinist Henry Charles Cooper (1819–1881). He later worked for Gardner & Madigan's Circus (re: the Gardner and Madigan families, including Dan Gardner and John Madigan) as treasurer and manager of the box office. During one circus performance, the assistant to the ropewalker Charles Blondin went missing. Blondin's opening stunt was to walk a tightrope from the stage to the balcony with a person on his back. T. Allston Brown filled in for the missing helper, and the Baltimore Press dubbed him "Colonel" for the deed. Brown adopted the honorary title and used it for the remainder of his career.

In 1863, Brown was named editor of the New York Clipper. He kept the post until 1872, when he retired from journalism. He next pursued a career as an agent and manager for entertainers. His clients included the famous female impersonator Ernest Byne (1848–1904), the Hanlon Brothers, and Mlle. Marie Aimée (sv) (1852–1857). On May 7, 1879, Brown became partner with Morris Simmonds (1839–1896) in Simmonds & Brown, Dramatic Agents, and continued to run the company after Simmonds died.

As early as 1858, Brown had begun compiling stories and biographies of theatrical performers in the United States. Much of his material came from players in the field, who supplied biographical sketches. He began to write a book on the subject, and in 1870 he published the exhaustive History of the American Stage. In 1906, he retired from show business to devote more time to history and writing. Brown died in Philadelphia in 1918. The New York Times wrote in Brown's obituary that A History of the New York Stage, published in 1903, "was said to be one of the most complete accounts of the development of the stage in America that has been written".
