= GRET =

Gret or GRET may refer to:

- MV Gret, a Russian coastal tanker
- Groupe de Recherches et d'Echanges Technologiques (acronym: GRET)
- Gret Palucca (1902–1993), German dancer and teacher
- Gret Loewensberg (born 1943), Swiss architect
- Eugenio Gret (1901–?), Argentine cyclist

== See also ==
- Dull Gret, Anglicized version of Dulle Griet, a figure of Flemish folklore
