= Jaroslav Brož =

Jaroslav Brož can refer to:

- Jaroslav Brož (cyclist) (born 1906), Czech Olympic cyclist
- Jaroslav Brož (long jumper) (1950–1975), Czech Olympic athlete
- Jaroslav Brož (general) (1898–1979), Czechoslovak general
