= George Owen (cyclist) =

British cyclist

Personal information
- Born: 18 August 1893
- Died: 1 June 1966 (aged 72)

Cycling career
- Sport: Cycling
- Role: Track cyclist

Professional team
- Manchester Wheelers

George Owen (18 August 1893 – 1 June 1966) was a British cyclist. He competed in the sprint event at the 1924 Summer Olympics.
