= Jaap Meijer =

Dutch cyclist (1905–1943)

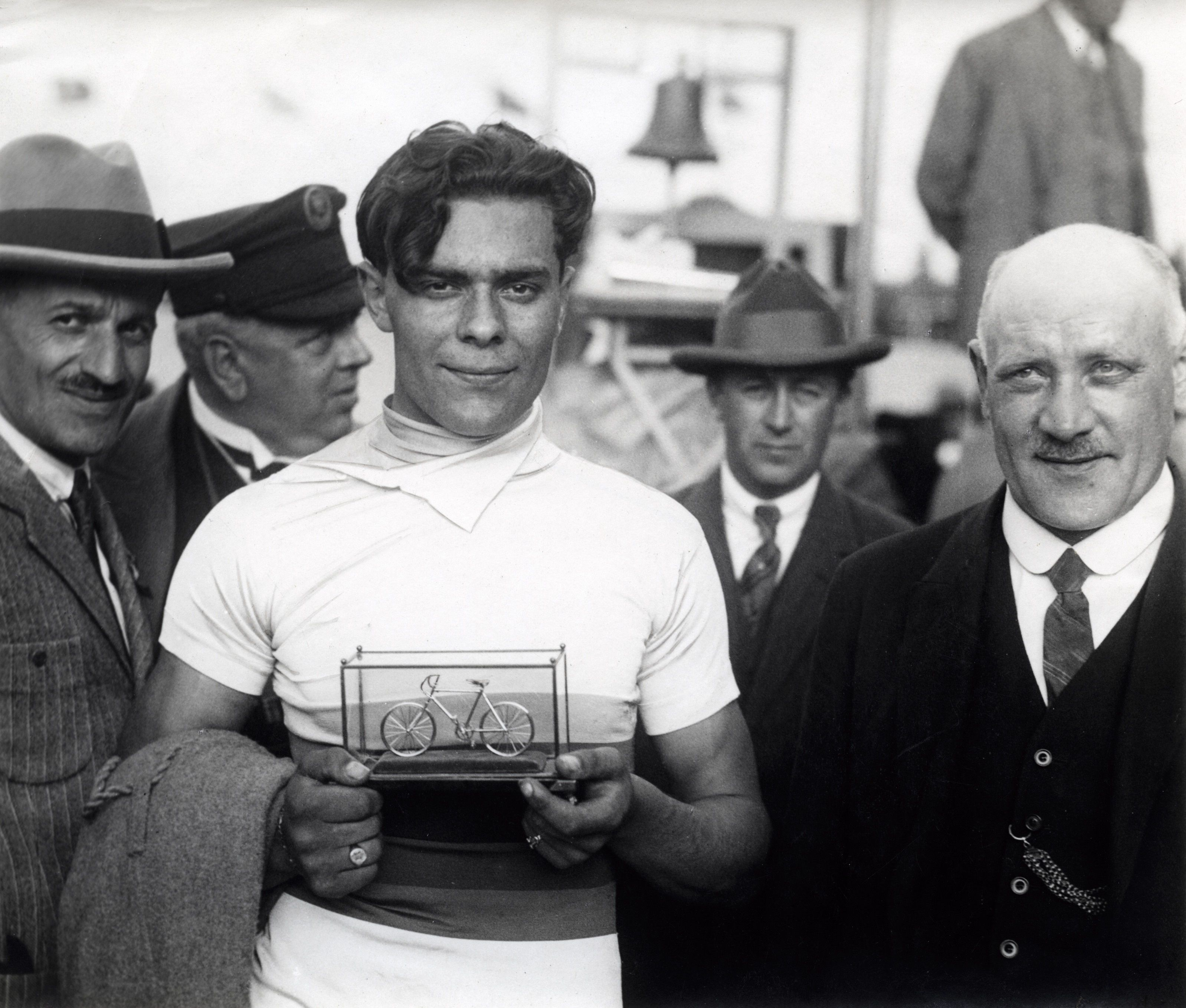
- Meijer in 1925

Medal record

Men's track cycling

Representing the Netherlands

Olympic Games
Silver medal – second place	1924 Paris	Sprint

Jacob "Jaap" Meijer (20 April 1905 in Amsterdam – 2 December 1943 in Meer, Belgium) was a track cyclist from the Netherlands, who represented his native country at the 1924 Summer Olympics in Paris, France. There he won the silver medal in the Men's 1.000m Sprint (Scratch).

== See also ==
- List of Dutch Olympic cyclists
