= Ko Willems =

Dutch cyclist (1900–1983)

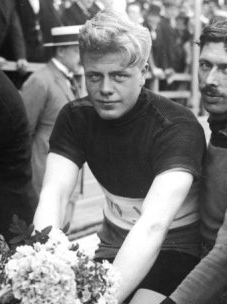

Personal information
- Full name: Jacobus Matheus Willems
- Born: 27 October 1900 Amsterdam, the Netherlands
- Died: 28 September 1983 (aged 82) Amsterdam, the Netherlands

Cycling career
- Sport: Cycling
- Discipline: Track
- Role: Rider
- Rider type: Endurance
Medal record
Men's track cycling
Representing the Netherlands
Olympic Games
Gold medal – first place	1924 Paris	50 km track race

Jacobus "Ko" Matheus Willems (27 October 1900 – 28 September 1983) was a track cyclist from the Netherlands, who represented his native country at the 1924 Summer Olympics in Paris, France. There he won the gold medal in the 50 km track race.

In that Olympic race, Willems worked together with Jan Maas. Maas kept attacking from the tenth kilometer, and the other cyclists spent energy trying to reach him. In the end, 15 cyclists remained, and Willems, who was the better sprinter, won the race.

== See also ==
- List of Dutch Olympic cyclists
