= Robert Broadbent =

Australian cyclist

Personal information
- Born: 5 November 1904 Richmond, Victoria, Australia
- Died: 4 October 1986 (aged 81) Prahran, Victoria, Australia

Cycling career
- Sport: Cycling

Robert Broadbent (5 November 1904 – 4 October 1986) was an Australian cyclist. He competed in the 50km event at the 1924 Summer Olympics.
