= Prudent De Bruyne =

Belgian cyclist

Personal information
- Born: 3 December 1905

Cycling career
- Sport: Cycling

Prudent De Bruyne (born 3 December 1905, date of death unknown) was a Belgian cyclist. He competed in the sprint event at the 1924 Summer Olympics.
