= Édouard Meunier =

French cyclist

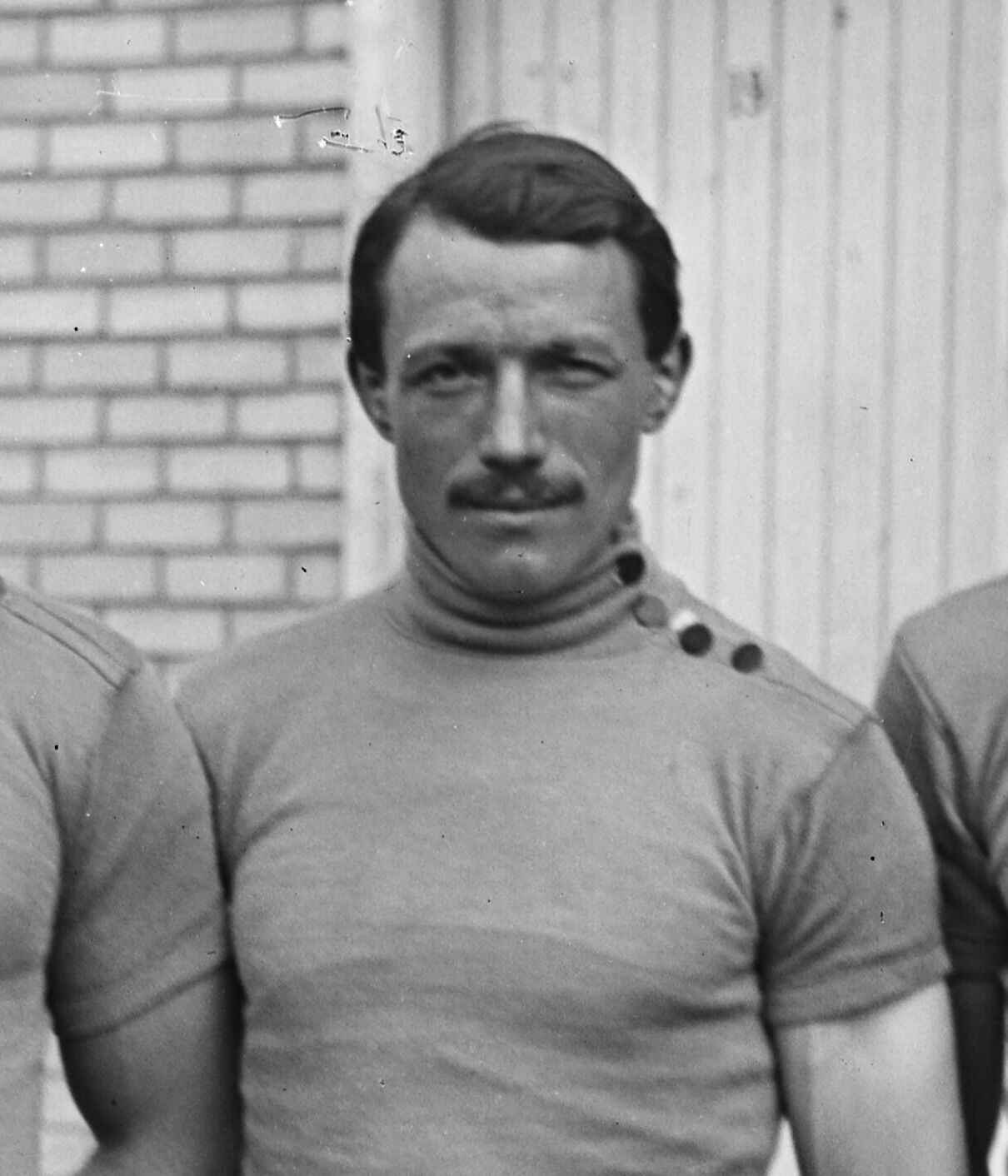

Personal information
- Born: 1894
- Died: Unknown

Cycling career
- Sport: Cycling

Édouard Meunier (born 1894, date of death unknown) was a French cyclist. He competed in the 50km event at the 1924 Summer Olympics.
