= Guglielmo Bossi =

Italian cyclist

Personal information
- Born: 8 September 1901 Milan, Italy
- Died: 8 May 1962 (aged 60)

Cycling career
- Sport: Cycling

Guglielmo Bossi (8 September 1901 – 8 May 1962) was an Italian cyclist. He competed in the sprint event at the 1924 Summer Olympics.
