= Prodan Georgiev =

Bulgarian cyclist

Personal information
- Born: 27 July 1904 (age 122)

Cycling career
- Sport: Cycling

Prodan Georgiev (Bulgarian: Продан Георгиев, born 27 July 1904, date of death unknown) was a Bulgarian cyclist. He competed in the 50km event at the 1924 Summer Olympics.
