= Louis Mermillod =

Swiss cyclist

Personal information
- Born: 1894
- Died: Unknown

Cycling career
- Sport: Cycling

Louis Mermillod (born 1894, date of death unknown) was a Swiss cyclist. He competed in the sprint event at the 1924 Summer Olympics.

Mermillod's results at the 1924 Paris sprint event were tabulated in contemporary Swiss cycling coverage. Reports from the same outlet emphasized Swiss participation across multiple cycling events that year.
