= Mohamed Ali Mahmoud =

Egyptian cyclist

Personal information
- Full name: Mohamed Ali Mahmoud

Cycling career
- Sport: Cycling

Mohamed Ali Mahmoud was an Egyptian cyclist. He competed in the 50km event at the 1924 Summer Olympics.
