= Maurice Gillen =

Luxembourgish cyclist

Personal information
- Born: 25 July 1895 Paris, France
- Died: 6 April 1974 (aged 78) Luxembourg City, Luxembourg

Cycling career
- Sport: Cycling

Maurice Gillen (25 July 1895 – 6 April 1974) was a Luxembourgish cyclist. He competed in the sprint event at the 1924 Summer Olympics. Outside of cycling he worked as a train driver. He was the father of cyclist Lucien Gillen. He also worked as a soigneur for rider Jean Majerus.
