= Josef Boons =

Belgian cyclist

Jean Boons
Personal information
- Full name: Jean Baptiste Boon
- Born: 28 December 1897 Berchem-Sainte-Agathe, Belgium

Cycling career
- Sport: Cycling

Jean Boons (born 28 December 1897, date of death unknown) was a Belgian cyclist. He competed in the 50km event at the 1924 Summer Olympics.
