= Boris Dimchev =

Bulgarian cyclist

Personal information
- Born: 1899

Cycling career
- Sport: Cycling

Boris Dimchev (Bulgarian: Борис Димчев, born 1899, date of death unknown) was a Bulgarian cyclist. He competed in the sprint event at the 1924 Summer Olympics.
