= Borislav Stoyanov (cyclist) =

Bulgarian cyclist

Personal information
- Born: 1904

Cycling career
- Sport: Cycling

Borislav Stoyanov (Bulgarian: Борислав Стоянов, born 1904, date of death unknown) was a Bulgarian cyclist. He competed in the 50km event at the 1924 Summer Olympics.
