= Laura Madigan =

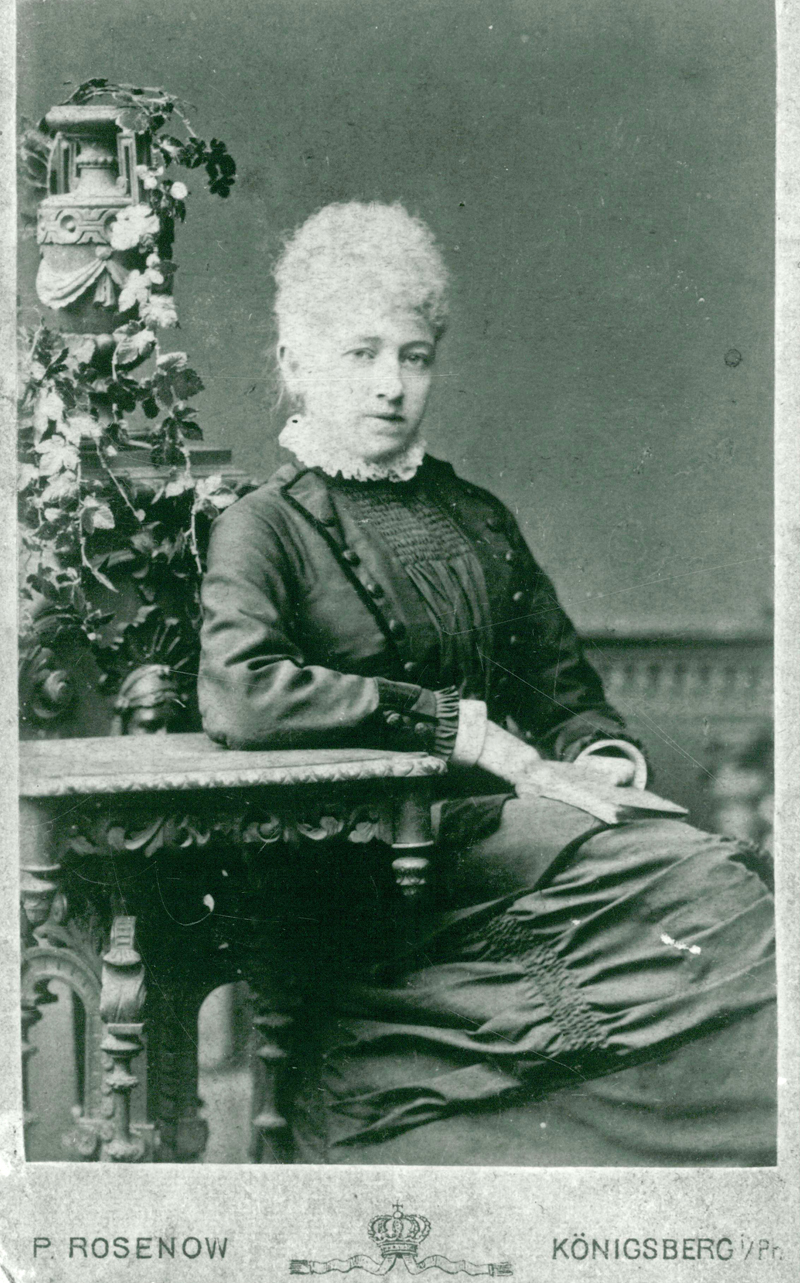
- Born: Eleonora Cecilia Christina Maria Olsen; 25 March 1849; Billnäs, Finland
- Died: 4 November 1918 (aged 69); Limhamn, Sweden
- Occupation: Circus director
- Spouse: John Madigan
- Children: Elvira Madigan

Eleonora Cecilia Christina Maria Olsen (25 March 1849 – 4 November 1918), better known under her stage name Laura Madigan, was a Swedish show rider and circus performer and director.

== Life ==
Laura Madigan, born Eleonora Cecilia Christina Maria Olsen, was the mother of Elvira Madigan. Her birth data are unconfirmed as she is not found in the Finnish registrations of birth records. Her parents were the Norwegian circus performers Olaj Elias Olsen (1819–1862) and Annamaria Olsen (1818–1908). During her childhood she lived in Finland and Sweden.

In 1867, she toured with the French circus director Didier Gautier's Cirque du Nord in northern Germany. There she got to know Danish circus performer Frederik Jensen with whom she had a daughter – Elvira Madigan – who was born in Flensburg in December 1867. The couple never married.

The tour continued to Denmark where she seems to have left Gautier's circus, and Elvira's father, to work instead for Cirkus Renz in Germany and Austria. At that time she started using the artistic name "Miss Ulbinska". In Berlin, on 30 March 1871, she gave birth to her second child, a boy she named Richard Henrich Olsen, who would later be a well known circus performer under the name Oscar Madigan (1871–1929). The father of this child is unknown.

Between 1873 and 1874, her whereabouts remain unknown. She would later claim that she worked in America. In 1875, she reappeared in Europe with Cirkus Myers in Austria and Germany. There she got to know circus performer John Madigan who would become her husband. The couple moved to the French circus director Francois Loisset's Cirque de Paris that was touring first in northern Germany, and then in Scandinavia, between 1876 and 1877. When Loisset died in Norrköping in the summer of 1877, his circus wound up, and the Madigan family moved to Russia. Most of their time there was spent with Ciniselli's circus in Saint Petersburg and Hinne's circus in Moscow.

In the summer of 1879 the family ran its own small circus in Finland, and now the couple's daughter, Elvira, performed as a tight-rope dancer. During the 1880s Elvira became known in the European circus scene, and the family toured around Europe with Elvira and Laura Madigan's foster child Gisela Brož.

In 1887 the family started its second circus, this time in Denmark. From October of that year the tour continued to Sweden. In January 1888, the circus visited Kristianstad. There Sixten Sparre came to see the performance. He became infatuated with Elvira Madigan and the two started sending letters to each other. In May 1889, Sparre managed to persuade Elvira Madigan to leave her family and the circus to live with him instead. After just two months Sparre murdered Elvira Madigan and committed suicide.

When the circus visited Gävle in August 1897, fire broke out in the building were the Madigan family was staying over night. The family managed to save themselves and get out of the building but John, who was badly burned all over his body, died two days later. He was buried in Gävle. Madigan later had the gravestone (but not the casket) moved to their family plot in Lund. She ran the circus for a few more years on her own, but in 1902 she sold it to a man named Henning Orlando, and it was renamed Cirkus Orlando.

Laura Madigan then resided in Limhamn, Sweden where she lived until her death in 1918. She is buried in St. Peter's Priory in Lund.
