= Herbert Fuller (cyclist) =

British cyclist

Personal information
- Born: 28 December 1902 London, England
- Died: 15 October 1993 (aged 90) London, England

Cycling career
- Sport: Cycling

Amateur team
- Marlborough CC, Islington

Herbert Edwin Fuller (28 December 1902 – 15 October 1993) was a British cyclist. He competed in the sprint event at the 1924 Summer Olympics.
