= Miloš Knobloch =

Czech cyclist

Personal information
- Born: 12 February 1905

Cycling career
- Sport: Cycling

Miloš Knobloch (born 12 February 1905, date of death unknown) was a Czech cyclist. He competed in two events at the 1924 Summer Olympics.
