= János Grimm =

Hungarian cyclist

Personal information
- Born: 17 October 1895 Budapest, Austria-Hungary
- Died: 24 September 1974 (aged 78)

Cycling career
- Sport: Cycling

János Grimm (17 October 1895 – 24 September 1974) was a Hungarian cyclist. He competed in two events at the 1924 Summer Olympics.
