= Brožek =

Brožek (feminine: Brožková) is a Czech surname. It is a diminutive of the name Brož, which is derived from the given name Ambrož (Czech variant of Ambrose). The Polish version of the surname is Brożek. Notable people with the surname include:

- Dana Brožková (born 1981), Czech orienteer
- Ferdinand Brožek (1896–1943), Czech rower
- Jaroslav Brožek (1923–2019), Czech painter and university educator
- Jiří Brožek (born 1947), Czech film editor
- Ladislav Brožek (born 1952), Slovak astronomist
- Radka Brožková (born 1984), Czech orienteer

== See also ==
- Jennifer Brozek (born 1970), American writer
