= Ferenc Uhereczky =

Hungarian cyclist

Personal information
- Born: 20 January 1898 Léva, Austria-Hungary (now Levice, Slovakia)
- Died: 1967 (aged 68–69) Bristol, England

Cycling career
- Sport: Cycling

Ferenc Uhereczky (20 January 1898 – 1967) was a Hungarian cyclist. He competed in two events at the 1924 Summer Olympics. During the 1910s and 1920s, Uhereczky won the Hungarian national title seven times.
