= John Madigan (ringmaster) =

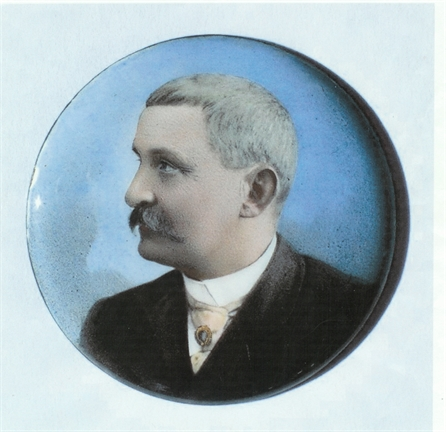
- Born: 12 August 1850; Lafayette, Indiana
- Died: 23 August 1897 (aged 47); Gävle, Sweden
- Occupation: Ringmaster
- Spouse: Laura Madigan

John Adalbert Madigan (12 August 1850 – 23 August 1897) was an American circus performer and ringmaster, during the later years of his life he worked in Scandinavia. He was raised in an American circus family of Irish background. He is known for his work in U.S. circus scenes between 1866 and 1869, but from 1872 he worked at Cirkus Myers in Central Europe. To this circus, the Swedish-Norwegian circus artist Eleonora Olsen, later known as Laura Madigan (mother of Elvira Madigan) came to work in 1875, the two became a couple.

Johan Madigan at this time performed as a rider in vaultage, his specialty was a double somersault from the horseback, but exactly how the routine was made is not known today. He also performed a pas-de-deux standing on the backs of two horses along with his loved one Laura Madigan. He later would perform this act along with his stepdaughter Elvira Madigan, who had to at times replace her mother.

In 1879, John tried to run his own small circus business in Finland, however as this proved unsuccessful the family looked for work in other circuses in Central Europe, where Elvira along with the fosterchild Gisela Brož did routines as tight-rope dancers. In 1887 Madigan along with his brother James Madigan, founded yet another circus, this time in Denmark. In the following year, Sixten Sparre visited Cirkus Madigan in Kristianstad, where he fell in love with Elvira, he persuaded her to leave the family, which she did in the end of May 1889. Less than two months later Elvira was murdered by Sparre who would then commit suicide.

The murder of Elvira Madigan was a huge blow for the family but the circus lived on. In late 1889 and onward the circus toured mainly in Sweden, but also in Finland and Norway. Laura and John Madigan became parents of a daughter called Motalia Madigan (1891–1892). She died less than a year after birth and a half-year after her death Laura and John married.

When the circus visited Gävle in August 1897, fire broke out in the building were the Madigan family was staying over night. The rest of the family managed to save themselves and get out of the building, but John got bad burns all over his body and died two days later. He was buried in Gävle. Laura later had the gravestone (but not the casket) moved to their family plot in Lund. Laura ran the circus for a few more years on her own, but in 1902 she sold the business to a circus performer named Henning Orlando, and the circus was renamed Cirkus Orlando.
