= Holger Guldager =

Danish cyclist (1904–1986)

Personal information
- Born: 16 September 1904 Copenhagen, Denmark
- Died: 10 August 1986 (aged 81) Frederiksberg, Denmark

Cycling career
- Sport: Cycling

Holger Oscar Christian Anders Guldager (16 September 1904 – 10 August 1986) was a Danish cyclist. He competed in two events at the 1924 Summer Olympics.
