= Philip Monk =

New Zealand cricketer (1907–1993)

Personal information
- Full name: Philip George Monk
- Born: 23 August 1907; Auckland, New Zealand
- Died: 17 October 1993 (aged 86); Christchurch, Canterbury, New Zealand
- Batting: Right-handed
- Bowling: Right-arm medium

Domestic team information
- Years: Team
- 1928/29–1929/30: Otago
- Source: ESPNcricinfo, 17 May 2016

Philip George Monk (23 August 1907 – 17 October 1993) was a New Zealand soldier cricketer. He played five first-class matches for Otago during the 1928–29 and 1929–30 seasons and served in both World War II and the Korean War.

== Early life and cricket ==
Monk was born at Auckland in 1907 and educated at Mount Albert Grammar School in the city. He played cricket at school and in Auckland for North Shore Cricket Club, and the Otago Daily Times wrote in 1929 that he had "put up some excellent performances when playing for the school eleven". The paper went on state that "when he left school he had the finest action of any fast bowler in Auckland, whipping the ball down from his full height", although the paper's cricket writer was of the opinion that his performances in Auckland had been "somewhat erratic" in nature.

Monk enlisted in the New Zealand Army and was stationed at Dunedin in Otago during the late 1920s. With the rank of corporal he acted as an instructor for the Otago Boys' High School cadet force in 1930. Whilst stationed in Otago he played cricket for Dunedin Cricket Club, and was described as "one of the most popular cricketers" in the city. He led the club's batting averages during the 1928–29 season, scoring two centuries and "frequently delighted the spectators with exhibitions of hard hitting".

It was primarily as a batmsan that Monk made his representative debut for Otago in a December 1928 match against Wellington at the Basin Reserve, making scores of 25 and 31 runs and taking a single wicket opening the bowling. He went on to play in both of Otago's other Plunket Shield matches during the 1928–29 season. The following season, Monk played for Otago against the touring England Test side and made a final Shield appearance against Canterbury at the end of the season. In his five first-class matches he scored a total of 157 runs and took six wickets.

== Wartime military career ==
In late 1930 Monk was transferred to Wellington, and although he played for Hutt Cricket Club he did not play any further top-class matches. By 1937 he was serving as a staff sergeant at Christchurch when he received a commission as a lieutenant. He transferred back to Wellington the following year and spent some time as an instructor in the New Zealand Staff Corps at Featherston. In early 1939 he was attached to the 2nd Field Company of Engineers, and served in Europe with the 22nd battalion as part of the New Zealand Expeditionary Force at the start of World War II. He played some cricket in England during 1940, and was promoted to the rank of captain, serving as part of the 2nd New Zealand Division during the German invasion of Greece, Battle of Crete and in the Middle East during 1941 and 1942. He returned to New Zealand during 1942 where he served at Army Headquarters. Towards the end of the war he served with the rank of temporary major.

== Post-war career ==
After the war Monk served on the management committee of the Hutt Valley Cricket Association, and by 1950 had been promoted to the rank of major, serving as the officer in charge of movements and quartering at Army Headquarters in Wellington. He was deputy-assistant quartermaster general at Wellington in 1951 and during the Korean War served in Japan with Kayforce as the force's quartermaster general, returning to New Zealand in 1954 to serve at the Southern Military Headquarters.

In 1953, Monk was awarded the Queen Elizabeth II Coronation Medal.

Monk was married and had two children, twins born in 1939. He died at Christchurch in 1993 at the age of 86. An obituary was published in the 1995 edition of the New Zealand Cricket Almanack.
