= Gisela Brož =

Austria-American circus performer, clown

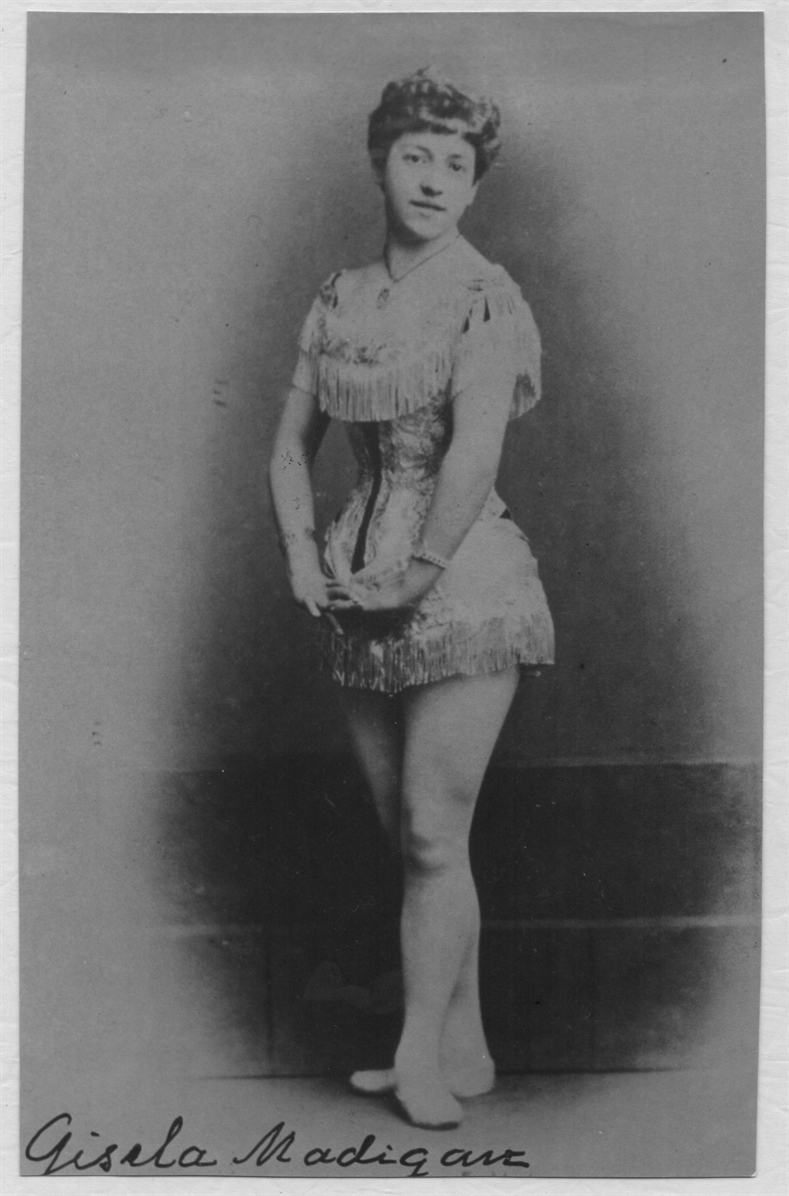
- Gisela Brož from a photo in the Circus Archive in Stockholm
- Born: April 4, 1865; Vienna, Austrian Empire
- Died: January 28, 1944 (aged 78); New York, USA
- Occupation: Circus performer
- Spouse: Alexander Braatzv (m.1888)
- Children: 2

Gisela Antonia Brož (Brosch) (April 4, 1865 – January 28, 1944), also sometimes referred to as Gisela Madigan, was an Austrian-American circus performer, tightrope dancer, and clown.

== Biography ==
Gisela Antonia Brož was born to the family of shoemaker Joseph Brož and his wife Maria. She went to convent school in Transylvania and at the age of 15, she got to know the Madigan circus family, including John and Laura, who at that time toured with Circus Krembser in Vienna. Gisela became their foster child and got to learn tightrope dancing, along with the couple's two-year-younger daughter Elvira Madigan, on the slack wire.

The girls performed a unique routine where they danced at the same time on separate ropes, one just above the other. The routine became a sensation, and for years the girls performed as the "Daughters of the air" at circuses and varieties all over Europe. After a performance at Tivoli in Copenhagen in 1886 in front of the Danish royal family, the girls were each awarded one golden cross by the king of Denmark. In Copenhagen, Gisela got to know the German circus performer Alexander Braatz (1864-1914), with whom she got engaged. In the year after, she left the Madigan family and married Alexander in London in the summer of 1888.

The couple emigrated to the US, where the couple, along with Alexander's brother and another relative, founded a group of musical clowns called Barra Troupe; the group toured the United States and Europe.

Gisela and her husband became American citizens in 1894. Alexander died around 1914; Gisela then lived as a widow in New York City until her death in 1944. The couple had two children together, Alice (n. 1888) and Walther (b. 1891).
