= Jan Maciejko =

Polish ice hockey player

- Born: January 2, 1913 Tarnów, Austria-Hungary
- Died: October 21, 1993 (aged 80) Kraków, Poland
- Height: 5 ft 8 in (173 cm)
- Weight: 160 lb (73 kg; 11 st 6 lb)
- Position: Goaltender
- Caught: Left
- Played for: Cracovia
- National team: Poland
- Playing career: 1926–1951

Jan Wincenty Maciejko (2 January 1913 — 21 October 1993), was a Polish ice hockey goaltender. He played for Cracovia during his career. He also played for the Polish national team at the 1948 Winter Olympics and several World Championships. During the invasion of Poland at the onset of the Second World War, he served in the Karpaty Army and was wounded near the town of Biłgoraj, and later fought with the Home Army. For this he was made a knight of the Virtuti Militari.
