= Graeme Bean =

Australian rules footballer

Personal information
- Full name: Graeme Bean
- Born: 24 April 1948
- Died: 5 October 1993 (aged 45)
- Height: 180 cm (5 ft 11 in)
- Weight: 80 kg (176 lb)

Playing career^{1}
Years	Club	Games (Goals)
1968	Footscray	7 (1)
- ^{1} Playing statistics correct to the end of 1968.

Graeme Bean (24 April 1948 – 5 October 1993) was an Australian rules footballer who played with Footscray in the Victorian Football League (VFL).
