= Artūrs Zeiberliņš =

Latvian cyclist

Personal information
- Born: 14 November 1897 Riga, Russian Empire
- Died: 3 May 1963 (aged 65)

Cycling career
- Sport: Cycling

Artūrs Zeiberliņš (14 November 1897 – 3 May 1963) was a Latvian cyclist. He competed in two events at the 1924 Summer Olympics.
