= Leopold Facco =

Austrian footballer (1907–1993)

Personal information
- Date of birth: 10 November 1907
- Date of death: 9 October 1993 (aged 85)
- Position: Forward

Senior career*
Years	Team	Apps	(Gls)
1927–1930	Brigittenauer AC		
1930–1934	SK Admira Wien		
1934–1935	Rouen		
1935–1937	Wiener Sport-Club		
1937	Grazer AK		
1938	Badener AC		

International career
1930–1931	Austria	2	(0)
- * Club domestic league appearances and goals

Leopold Facco (10 November 1907 – 9 October 1993) was an Austrian footballer who played as a forward. He made two appearances for the Austria national team from 1930 to 1931.
