= Brożek (surname) =

Brożek is a Polish surname. The Czech version of the surname is Brožek. Notable people with the surname include:

- Anna Brożek (born 1980), Polish philosopher
- Bartosz Brożek (born 1977), Polish philosopher and jurist
- Franciszek Brożek (1890–1940), Polish sport shooter
- Jan Brożek (1585–1652), Polish polymath
- Mirosław Kuba Brożek, Polish cinematographer
- Paweł Brożek (born 1983), Polish footballer
- Piotr Brożek (born 1983), Polish footballer

== See also ==
- Jennifer Brozek (born 1970), American writer
