= Oldřich Červinka =

Czech cyclist

Personal information
- Born: 1905

Cycling career
- Sport: Cycling
- Disciplines: Sprint, team pursuit

Amateur team
- Czechoslovakia

Oldřich Červinka (born 1905 – ?) was a Czech cyclist. He competed in two events at the 1924 Summer Olympics.
