= Hans Walter Wolff =

German Protestant theologian (1911–1993)

- Born: 17 December 1911; Barmen, German Empire
- Died: 22 October 1993 (aged 81); Heidelberg, Germany
- Occupations: Author, professor
- Notable work: Dodekapropheton (Biblischer Kommentar Altes Testamen), 6 vols.
- Theological work
- Language: German
- Tradition or movement: Form criticism, historical criticism

Hans Walter Wolff (17 December 1911 – 22 October 1993) was a German Protestant theologian. He was professor at the University of Mainz from 1959 to 1967, and from 1967 to 1978 he was Professor of Old Testament at the University of Heidelberg.

== Life ==
=== Career ===
The son of a merchant, he attended the Barmer Realgymnasium, where he graduated in the spring of 1931. He studied Protestant theology, first at the Bethel University of Theology, then at the Georg August University of Göttingen and the Rheinische Friedrich Wilhelms University of Bonn. In the spring of 1935, he finally passed his first theological examination at the Confessional Synod in the Rhineland and initially became a vicar in Münster, but was then sent to provide pastoral care to students at the Kirchliche Hochschule Wuppertal. From April 1937, he was an assistant preacher in Solingen-Wald, and in 1938 Wolff passed his second theological examination. Despite being called up for military service, he was able to obtain his license theology degree in 1942 at the Faculty of Theology in Halle with his thesis Isaiah 53 in Early Christianity: The History of the Prophecy “Behold, My Servant Shall Triumph” up to Justin. From 1946 to 1949, Wolff was pastor of the fourth district of the Protestant congregation in Solingen-Wald. He also lectured at the Kirchliche Hochschule Wuppertal (Wuppertal University of Theology), where he was appointed to the chair of Old Testament studies in 1952 and also served as ephorus on a part-time basis. In 1959, he became full professor of Old Testament at Johannes Gutenberg University Mainz. In 1967, Hans Walter Wolff accepted a position at the theological faculty of Ruprecht Karls University Heidelberg, where he became professor emeritus in 1978.

==== Personal life ====
Hans Walter Wolff's first marriage was to Annemarie Halstenbach, daughter of Willy Halstenbach, a factory owner from Barmen who was very involved in reestablishing the Kirchliche Hochschule (Church University) in Wuppertal after World War II. They had seven children (including philosopher Michael Wolff and musicologist Christoph Wolff). After his wife's death, Wolff married her cousin Hilderuth Halstenbach. He died at the age of 81.

== Selected works ==
- Amos the Prophet (1973)
- The Old Testament: A Guide to Its Writings (1973)
- Anthropology of the Old Testament (1974)
- The Vitality of Old Testament Traditions (1975, with Walter Brueggemann)
- Hosea (1977)
- Joel and Amos (1977)
- Micah (1981)
- Haggai (1990)
- Obadiah and Jonah (1991)

== See also ==
- Christoph Wolff – his son
