= William Fenn (cyclist) =

American cyclist

Personal information
- Born: September 14, 1904 Newark, New Jersey, United States
- Died: December 22, 1980 (aged 76) Point Pleasant, New Jersey, United States

Cycling career
- Sport: Cycling

William Fenn (September 14, 1904 – December 22, 1980) was an American cyclist. He competed in two events at the 1924 Summer Olympics.

Born in Newark, New Jersey, Fenn lived in Lavallette, New Jersey, and worked as an auto mechanic for an area car dealer. He died at the age of 76 in Point Pleasant Hospital on December 20, 1980.
