= Jean Verheyen =

Belgian cyclist

Personal information
- Born: 29 February 1896 Antwerp, Belgium
- Died: 4 June 1954 (aged 58)

Cycling career
- Sport: Cycling

Jean Verheyen (29 February 1896 – 4 June 1954) was a Belgian cyclist. He competed in two events at the 1924 Summer Olympics.
