= Francesco Del Grosso =

Italian cyclist (1899–1938)

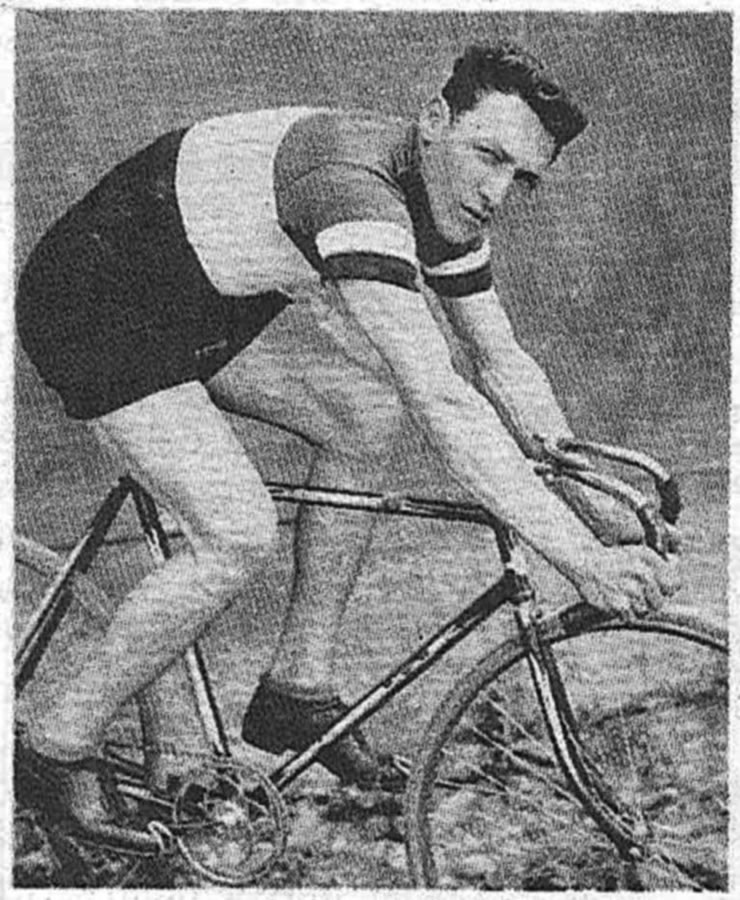
- Francesco Del Grosso

Personal information
- Born: 28 September 1899 Parma, Italy
- Died: 22 July 1938 (aged 38) Barracas, Spain

Cycling career
- Sport: Cycling

Francesco Del Grosso (28 September 1899 – 22 July 1938) was an Italian cyclist. He competed in two events at the 1924 Summer Olympics. He was killed fighting for the Nationalist faction during the Spanish Civil War.
