= Walter Coppins =

Australian cyclist

Personal information
- Born: 29 May 1902
- Died: 11 December 1981 (aged 79)

Cycling career
- Sport: Cycling

Walter Coppins (29 May 1902 – 11 December 1981) was an Australian cyclist. He competed in two events at the 1924 Summer Olympics.
