= Eugenio Gret =

Argentine cyclist

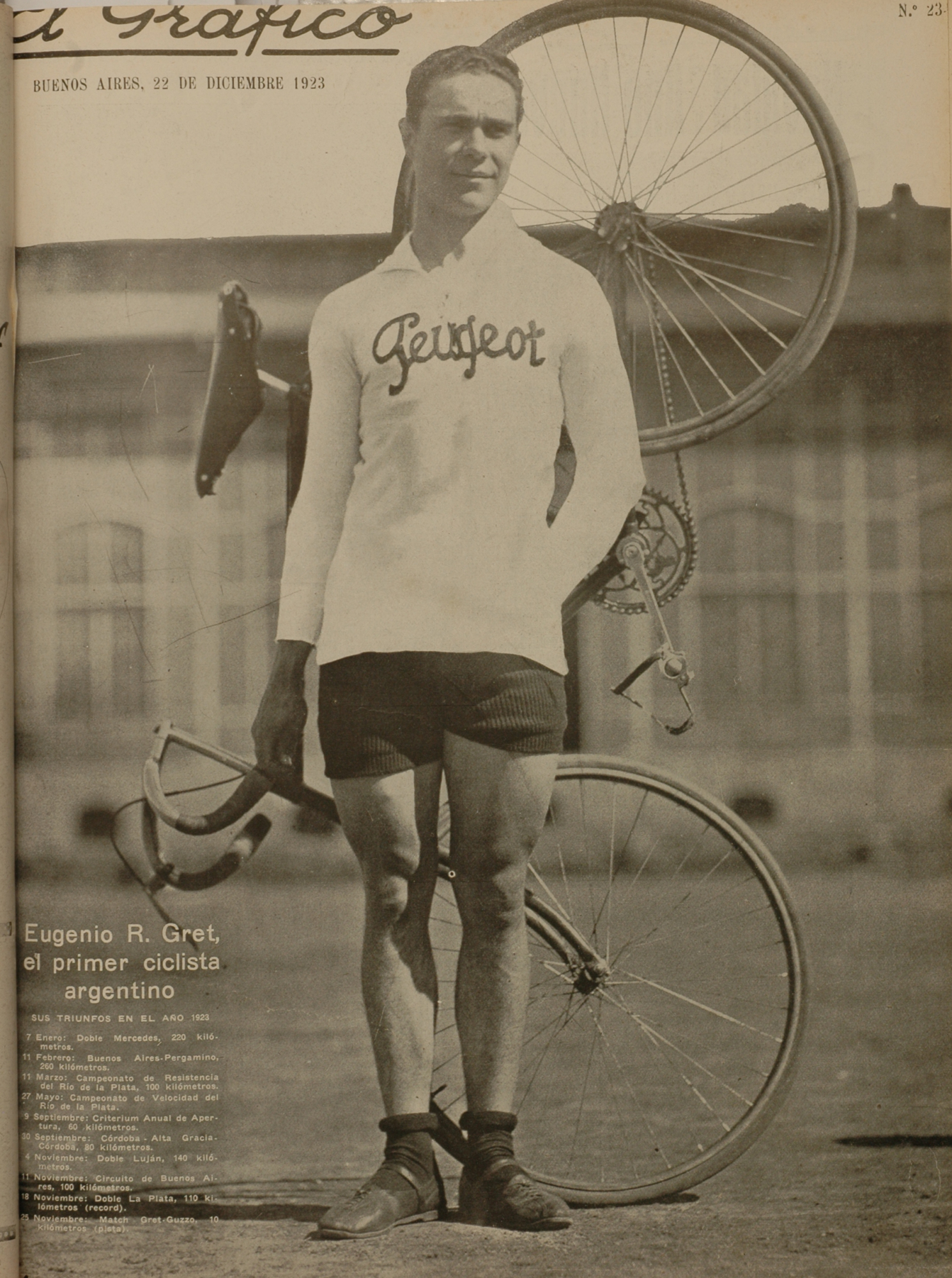

Personal information
- Born: 9 August 1901

Cycling career
- Sport: Cycling

Eugenio Gret (born 9 August 1901, date of death unknown) was an Argentine cyclist. He competed in two events at the 1924 Summer Olympics.
