= Jaroslav Brož (cyclist) =

Czech cyclist

Personal information
- Born: 1 April 1906 Prague, Bohemia, Austria-Hungary
- Died: 6 October 1953 (aged 47) Prague, Czechoslovakia

Cycling career
- Sport: Cycling

Jaroslav Brož (1 April 1906 – 6 October 1953) was a Czech cyclist.

== Life and career ==
Jaroslav Brož was born on 1 April in Prague. He won seven Czechoslovak champion titles in outdoor (50 km) and track (1 km, 5 km) disciplines. By 1924, he had scored 19 race victories. This earned him a spot in the 1924 Summer Olympics, even though he was only 18 years old. He competed there in two events. He lived in Říčany, where he married in 1937. In 1935, he opened a shop there where he sold and repaired bicycles. He died in Prague on 6 October 1953, at the age of 47. He was one of the pioneers of Czechoslovak cycling and one of the most successful Czech cycling racers ever.
