= Francisco Juillet =

Chilean cyclist

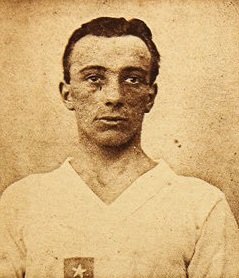

Personal information
- Born: 15 June 1898
- Died: 26 October 1987 (aged 89)

Cycling career
- Sport: Cycling

Francisco Juillet (15 June 1898 – 26 October 1987) was a Chilean cyclist. He competed in two events at the 1924 Summer Olympics and one event at the 1928 Summer Olympics.
