= Alejandro Vidal =

Chilean cyclist

Personal information
- Born: 19 May 1895

Cycling career
- Sport: Cycling

Alejandro Vidal (born 19 May 1895, date of death unknown) was a Chilean cyclist. He competed in two events at the 1924 Summer Olympics and one event at the 1928 Summer Olympics.
