= Ricardo Bermejo =

Chilean cyclist (1900–1957)

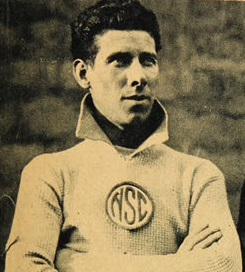

Personal information
- Born: 1900
- Died: 17 August 1957 (aged 56–57)

Cycling career
- Sport: Cycling

Ricardo Bermejo (1900 – 17 August 1957) was a Chilean cyclist. He competed in two events at the 1924 Summer Olympics.
