= Noppie Koch =

Dutch cyclist (1932–2010)

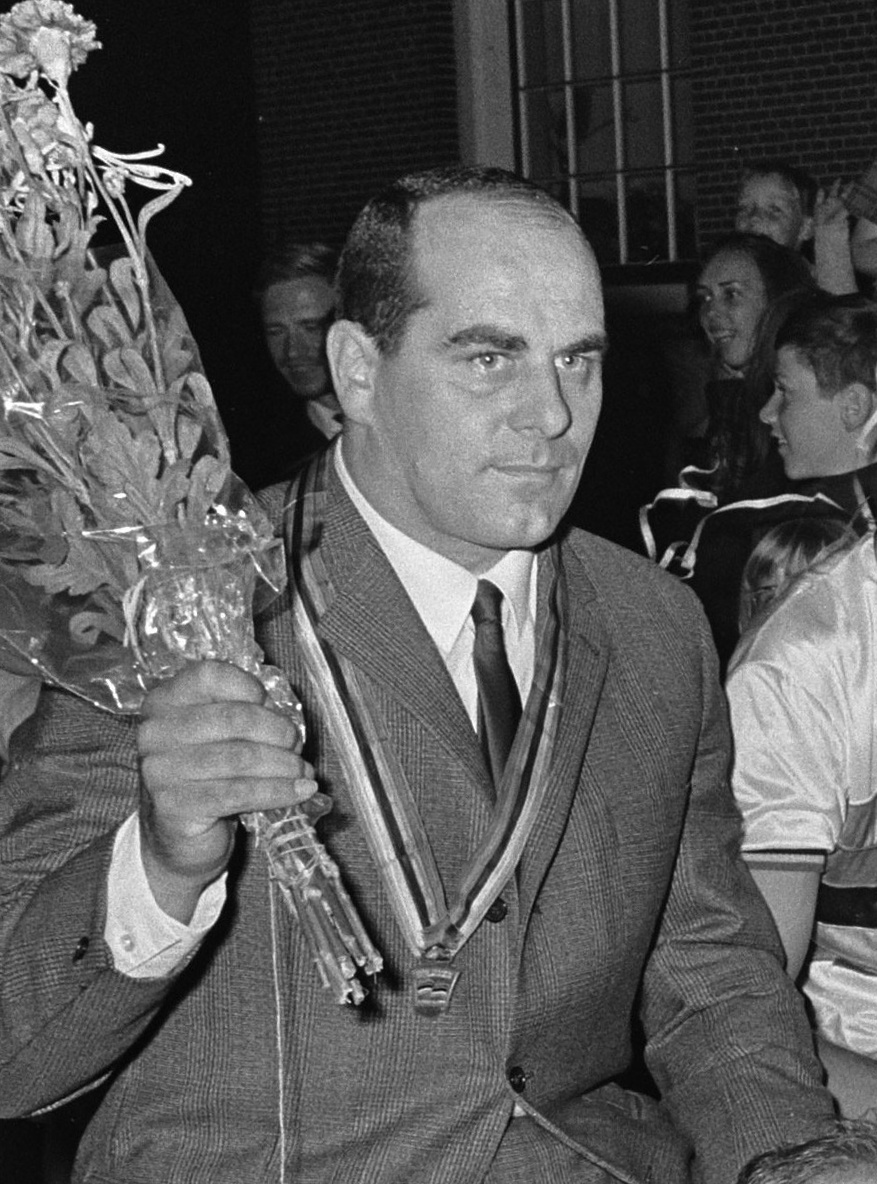
- Koch in 1967

Personal information
- Born: 22 March 1932 Utrecht, the Netherlands
- Died: 7 December 2010 (aged 78) Nieuwegein, the Netherlands

Sport
- Sport: Motor-paced racing
Medal record
Representing the Netherlands
World Championships
Bronze medal – third place	1959 Amsterdam	Professionals
Bronze medal – third place	1960 Leipzig	Professionals

Longinus Johannes Norbert "Noppie" Koch (22 March 1932 – 7 December 2010) was a cyclist and pacer from the Netherlands. As a cyclist he became national champion in 1959, 1962 and 1963 and won two bronze medals at the UCI Motor-paced World Championships in 1959 and 1960, in the professionals category. He was then injured in an accident at the factory where he worked and had to retire from racing. He became a pacer in motor-paced racing, bringing Piet de Wit, Leo Proost, Martin Venix and Mattheus Pronk to the UCI Motor-paced World Championships titles.

His fame as a pacemaker spread beyond the Netherlands, and he was invited to work with German and Belgian cyclists such as Dieter Kemper, Theo Verschueren and Stan Tourné. Although UCI required the pacer and the cyclist to be from the same country, Koch, together with another international pacer Bruno Walrave, successfully argued in the Dutch court to remove this rule. The basis for the claim was that Koch and Walrave would lose their jobs as pacers because of the discrimination by their nationality.

In total, as a pacer Koch won 10 world and 14 European titles between 1965 and 1987. He retired in 1988/1989 after being injured in a crash during a race.
