= Vanderstuyft =

Vanderstuyft, Van der Stuyft, Vander Stuyft is a surname. Notable people with the surname include:

- Arthur Vanderstuyft (1883–1956), Belgian cyclist
- Fritz Vanderstuyft (1854–1922), Belgian cyclist, father of Arthur and Léon
- Léon Vanderstuyft (1890–1964), Belgian cyclist
