= UCI Motor-paced World Championships =

International track cycling competition

UCI Track Cycling World Championships in motor-paced racing were conducted between 1893 and 1992 for amateurs and 1895–1994 for professionals. These are the results:

== Amateurs (1893–1992) ==
Games	Gold	Silver	Bronze
1893	Laurens Meintjes (ZAF)	Charles Albrecht (GER)	B. Ulbricht (USA)
1894	Wilhelm Henie (NOR)	Jack Green (GBR)	Jan Van Oolen (BEL)
1895	Mathieu Cordang (NED)	Cees Witteveen (NED)	Wilhelm Henie (NOR)
1896	Ferdinand Ponscarme (FRA)	Michael Djakoff (RUS)	Andreas Hansen (DEN)
1897	Edward Gould (GBR)	Emile Ouzon (FRA)	Rasmond Tjoerby (DEN)
1898	Albert-John Cherry (GBR)	Gustav Graben (GER)	Anton Huneck (AUT)
1899	John Nelson (USA)	Robert Goodson (AUS)	William Riddle (CAN)
1900	Louis Bastien (FRA)	Wilhelm Henie (NOR)	Lloyd Hildebrand (GBR)
1901	Heinrich Sievers (GER)	Bruno Salzmann (GER)	Alfred Görnemann (GER)
1902	Alfred Görnemann (GER)	Fritz Keller (GER)	Johan Dielhe (GER)
1903	Edmond Audemars (SUI)	Vittorio Carlevaro (ITA)	Reinhold Herzog (GER)
1904	Leon Meredith (GBR)	W.J. Pett (GBR)	George A. Olley (GBR)
1905	Leon Meredith (GBR)	Willy Mest (GER)	Auguste Carremans (BEL)
1906	Maurice Bardonneau (FRA)	Victor Tubbax (BEL)	Emile Eigeldinger (FRA)
1907	Leon Meredith (GBR)	Victor Tubbax (BEL)	Maurice Brocco (FRA)
1908	Leon Meredith (GBR)	Gustav Janke (DEN)	Léon Vanderstuyft (BEL)
1909	Leon Meredith (GBR)	Maurice Cuzin (FRA)	Georges Patou (BEL)
1910	Henri Hens (BEL)	Louis Delbor (FRA)	Sydney F. Bailey (GBR)
1911	Leon Meredith (GBR)	Bertus Mulckhijze (NED)	Pietro Lori (ITA)
1913	Leon Meredith (GBR)	Alex Beyer (GER)	Cor Blekemolen (NED)
1914	Cor Blekemolen (NED)	Jacques Van Ginkel (BEL)	Walter Stelzer (GER)
1958	Lothar Meister (GDR)	Heinz Wahl (GDR)	Arie van Houwelingen (NED)
1959	Arie van Houwelingen (NED)	Bernard Deconinck (FRA)	Lothar Meister (GDR)
1960	Georg Stoltze (GDR)	Siegfried Wustrow (GDR)	Henk Buis (NED)
1961	Leendert van der Meulen (NED)	Siegfried Wustrow (GDR)	Georg Stoltze (GDR)
1962	Romain De Loof (BEL)	Hans Lauppi (SUI)	Christian Giscos (FRA)
1963	Romain De Loof (BEL)	Karl-Heinz Matthes (GDR)	Ueli Luginbhül (SUI)
1964	Jaap Oudkerk (NED)	Jean Walschaerts (BEL)	Daniel Salmon (FRA)
1965	Miguel Mas (ESP)	Etienne Van Der Vieren (BEL)	Alain Maréchal (FRA)
1966	Piet de Wit (NED)	Bert Romyn (NED)	Christian Giscos (FRA)
1967	Piet de Wit (NED)	Michail Markov (URS)	Dries Helsloot (NED)
1968	Giuseppe Grassi (ITA)	Cees Stam (NED)	Benny Herger (SUI)
1969	Bert Boom (NED)	Cees Stam (NED)	Jörg Peter (SUI)
1970	Cees Stam (NED)	Horst Gnas (FRG)	Antonio Cerda (ESP)
1971	Horst Gnas (FRG)	Rainer Podlesch (FRG)	Bert Boom (NED)
1972	Horst Gnas (FRG)	Jean Breuer (FRG)	Gaby Minneboo (NED)
1973	Horst Gnas (FRG)	Rainer Podlesch (FRG)	Gaby Minneboo (NED)
1974	Jean Breuer (FRG)	Martin Venix (NED)	Miguel Espinós (ESP)
1975	Gaby Minneboo (NED)	Miguel Espinós (ESP)	Jean Pinsello (FRA)
1976	Gaby Minneboo (NED)	Bartolome Caldentey (ESP)	Rainer Podlesch (FRG)
1977	Gaby Minneboo (NED)	Bartolome Caldentey (ESP)	Rainer Podlesch (FRG)
1978	Rainer Podlesch (FRG)	Mattheus Pronk (NED)	Martin Rietveld (NED)
1979	Mattheus Pronk (NED)	Guido Van Meel (BEL)	Gaby Minneboo (NED)
1980	Gaby Minneboo (NED)	Mattheus Pronk (NED)	Bartolome Caldentey (ESP)
1981	Mattheus Pronk (NED)	Rainer Podlesch (FRG)	Max Hürzeler (SUI)
1982	Gaby Minneboo (NED)	Mattheus Pronk (NED)	Rainer Podlesch (FRG)
1983	Rainer Podlesch (FRG)	Mattheus Pronk (NED)	Walter Baumgartner (SUI)
1984	Jan de Nijs (NED)	Roberto Dotti (ITA)	Ralf Stambula (FRG)
1985	Roberto Dotti (ITA)	Roland Königshofer (AUT)	Mario Gentili (ITA)
1986	Mario Gentili (ITA)	Luigi Bieli (ITA)	Roland Königshofer (AUT)
1987	Mario Gentili (ITA)	Vincenzo Colamartino (ITA)	Roland Königshofer (AUT)
1988	Disqualification*	Roland Königshofer (AUT)	Disqualification*
1989	Roland Königshofer (AUT)	Tonino Vittigli (ITA)	Thomas Königshofer (AUT)
1990	Roland Königshofer (AUT)	David Solari (ITA)	Andrea Bellati (SUI)
1991	Roland Königshofer (AUT)	David Solari (ITA)	Carsten Podlesch (GER)
1992	Carsten Podlesch (GER)	David Solari (ITA)	Roland Königshofer (AUT)

- In 1988 Vincenzo Colamartino and Roland Renn were disqualified for doping.

== Professionals (1895–1994) ==
Games	Gold	Silver	Bronze
1895	Jimmy Michael (GBR)	Henri Luyten (BEL)	Hans Hofmann (GER)
1896	Arthur Adalbert Chase (GBR)	Jack William Stocks (GBR)	Franz Gerger (AUT)
1897	Jack William Stocks (GBR)	Arthur Adalbert Chase (GBR)	Fred Armstrong (GBR)
1898	Richard Palmer (GBR)		
1899	Harry Gibson (CAN)	Hugh Mclean (USA)	Ken Boake (USA)
1900	Constant Huret (FRA)	Edouard Taylor (FRA)	Émile Bouhours (FRA)
1901	Thaddäus Robl (GER)	Piet Dickentman (NED)	Fritz Ryser (SUI)
1902	Thaddäus Robl (GER)	Émile Bouhours (FRA)	Edouard Taylor (FRA)
1903	Piet Dickentman (NED)	Thaddäus Robl (GER)	Alfred Görnemann (GER)
1904	Robert Walthour (USA)	César Simar (FRA)	Arthur Vanderstuyft (BEL)
1905	Robert Walthour (USA)	Paul Guignard (FRA)	Piet Dickentman (NED)
1906	Louis Darragon (FRA)	Arthur Vanderstuyft (BEL)	Schwitzgubel (SUI)
1907	Louis Darragon (FRA)	Karel Verbist (BEL)	Georges Parent (FRA)
1908	Fritz Ryser (SUI)	Eugenio Bruni (ITA)	Arthur Vanderstuyft (BEL)
1909	Georges Parent (FRA)	Louis Darragon (FRA)	Nat Butler (USA)
1910	Georges Parent (FRA)	Léon Vanderstuyft (BEL)	Robert Walthour (USA)
1911	Georges Parent (FRA)	Louis Darragon (FRA)	James-Henri Moran (USA)
1912	George E. Wiley (USA)	Elmer Collins (USA)	James-Henri Moran (USA)
1913	Paul Guignard (FRA)	Jules Miquel (FRA)	Richard Scheuermann (GER)
1920	Georges Sérès (FRA)	Victor Linart (BEL)	Paul Suter (SUI)
1921	Victor Linart (BEL)	Paul Suter (SUI)	Paul Guignard (FRA)
1922	Léon Vanderstuyft (BEL)	Paul Suter (SUI)	Gustave Ganay (FRA)
1923	Paul Suter (SUI)	Léon Parisot (FRA)	Karl Wittig (GER)
1924	Victor Linart (BEL)	Georges Sérès (FRA)	L. Toricelli (ITA)
1925	Robert Grassin (FRA)	Jan Snoek (NED)	Georges Sérès (FRA)
1926	Victor Linart (BEL)	Gustave Ganay (FRA)	Paul Suter (SUI)
1927	Victor Linart (BEL)	Paul Krewer (GER)	Walter Sawall (GER)
1928	Walter Sawall (GER)	Henri Breau (FRA)	Victor Linart (BEL)
1929	Georges Paillard (FRA)	Victor Linart (BEL)	Paul Krewer (GER)
1930	Erich Möller (GER)	Georges Paillard (FRA)	Robert Grassin (FRA)
1931	Walter Sawall (GER)	Erich Möller (GER)	Victor Linart (BEL)
1932	Georges Paillard (FRA)	Walter Sawall (GER)	Erich Möller (GER)
1933	Charles Lacquehay (FRA)	Franco Giorgetti (ITA)	Erich Metze (GER)
1934	Erich Metze (GER)	Paul Krewer (GER)	Eduardo Severgnini (ITA)
1935	Charles Lacquehay (FRA)	Erich Metze (GER)	Georges Ronsse (BEL)
1936	André Raynaud (FRA)	Charles Lacquehay (FRA)	Georges Ronsse (BEL)
1937	Walter Lohmann (GER)	Ernest Terreau (FRA)	Adolf Schön (GER)
1938	Erich Metze (GER)	Walter Lohmann (GER)	Eduardo Severgnini (ITA)
1946	Elia Frosio (ITA)	Jacques Besson (SUI)	Louis Chaillot (FRA)
1947	Raoul Lesueur (FRA)	Jean-Jacques Lamboley (FRA)	Jan Pronk (NED)
1948	Jean-Jacques Lamboley (FRA)	Elia Frosio (ITA)	August Meuleman (BEL)
1949	Elia Frosio (ITA)	Jan Pronk (NED)	Raoul Lesueur (FRA)
1950	Raoul Lesueur (FRA)	Jan Pronk (NED)	Georges Fils Seres (FRA)
1951	Jan Pronk (NED)	Andreas Leliaert (BEL)	Henri Lemoine (FRA)
1952	Adolph Verschueren (BEL)	Walter Lohmann (FRG)	Henri Lemoine (FRA)
1953	Adolph Verschueren (BEL)	Roger Queugnet (FRA)	Henri Lemoine (FRA)
1954	Adolph Verschueren (BEL)	Jan Pronk (NED)	Joe Bunker (AUS)
1955	Guillermo Timoner (ESP)	Walter Bucher (SUI)	Giuseppe Martino (ITA)
1956	Graham French (AUS)	Guillermo Timoner (ESP)	Walter Bucher (SUI)
1957	Paul Depaepe (BEL)	Walter Bucher (SUI)	Graham French (AUS)
1958	Walter Bucher (SUI)	Guillermo Timoner (ESP)	Wouter Wagtmans (NED)
1959	Guillermo Timoner (ESP)	Walter Bucher (SUI)	Norbert Koch (NED)
1960	Guillermo Timoner (ESP)	Martin Wierstra (NED)	Norbert Koch (NED)
1961	Karl-Heinz Marsell (FRG)	Paul Depaepe (BEL)	Max Meier (SUI)
1962	Guillermo Timoner (ESP)	Paul Depaepe (BEL)	Leo Wickihalder (SUI)
1963	Leo Proost (BEL)	Paul Depaepe (BEL)	Robert Varnajo (FRA)
1964	Guillermo Timoner (ESP)	Leo Proost (BEL)	Karl-Heinz Marsell (FRG)
1965	Guillermo Timoner (ESP)	Romain De Loof (BEL)	Jaap Oudkerk (NED)
1966	Romain De Loof (BEL)	Ehrenfried Rudolph (FRG)	Leo Proost (BEL)
1967	Leo Proost (BEL)	Romain De Loof (BEL)	Domenico De Lillo (ITA)
1968	Leo Proost (BEL)	Piet de Wit (NED)	Ehrenfried Rudolph (FRG)
1969	Jaap Oudkerk (NED)	Theo Verschueren (BEL)	Domenico De Lillo (ITA)
1970	Ehrenfried Rudolph (FRG)	Theo Verschueren (BEL)	Piet de Wit (NED)
1971	Theo Verschueren (BEL)	Jaap Oudkerk (NED)	Domenico De Lillo (ITA)
1972	Theo Verschueren (BEL)	Cees Stam (NED)	Dieter Kemper (FRG)
1973	Cees Stam (NED)	Piet de Wit (NED)	Christian Raymond (FRA)
1974	Cees Stam (NED)	Theo Verschueren (BEL)	Attilio Benfatto (ITA)
1975	Dieter Kemper (FRG)	Cees Stam (NED)	Jean Breuer (BEL)
1976	Wilfried Peffgen (FRG)	Cees Stam (NED)	Walter Avogradi (ITA)
1977	Cees Stam (NED)	Wilfried Peffgen (FRG)	Pietro Algeri (ITA)
1978	Wilfried Peffgen (FRG)	Martinus Venix (NED)	Cees Stam (NED)
1979	Martinus Venix (NED)	Wilfried Peffgen (FRG)	Cees Stam (NED)
1980	Wilfried Peffgen (FRG)	René Kos (NED)	Bruno Vicino (ITA)
1981	René Kos (NED)	Bruno Vicino (ITA)	Wilfried Peffgen (FRG)
1982	Martinus Venix (NED)	Wilfried Peffgen (FRG)	Bruno Vicino (ITA)
1983	Bruno Vicino (ITA)	René Kos (NED)	Martin Havik (NED)
1984	Horst Schütz (FRG)	Max Hürzeler (SUI)	Stan Tourné (BEL)
1985	Bruno Vicino (ITA)	Danny Clark (AUS)	Werner Betz (FRG)
1986	Bruno Vicino (ITA)	Stan Tourné (BEL)	Giovanni Renosto (ITA)
1987	Max Hürzeler (SUI)	Danny Clark (AUS)	Werner Betz (FRG)
1988	Danny Clark (AUS)	Stan Tourné (BEL)	Walter Brugna (ITA)
1989	Giovanni Renosto (ITA)	Walter Brugna (ITA)	Torsten Rellensmann (GER)
1990	Walter Brugna (ITA)	Peter Steiger (SUI)	Danny Clark (AUS)
1991	Danny Clark (AUS)	Peter Steiger (SUI)	Arno Küttel (SUI)
1992	Peter Steiger (SUI)	Jens Veggerby (DEN)	Antonio Fanelli (ITA)
1993	Jens Veggerby (DEN)	Roland Königshofer (AUT)	Carsten Podlesch (GER)
1994	Carsten Podlesch (GER)	Roland Königshofer (AUT)	Alessandro Tessin (ITA)
