= Caldentey =

Caldentey (pronounced [kəldənˈtej]) is a Catalan surname. Notable people with the surname include:

- Bartolomé Caldentey (born 1951), retired Spanish cyclist
- Lola Sánchez Caldentey (born 1978), Spanish politician
- Mariona Caldentey (born 1996), Spanish footballer

== See also ==
- 72804 Caldentey, a minor planet
