= Franz Gerger =

Austrian racing cyclist

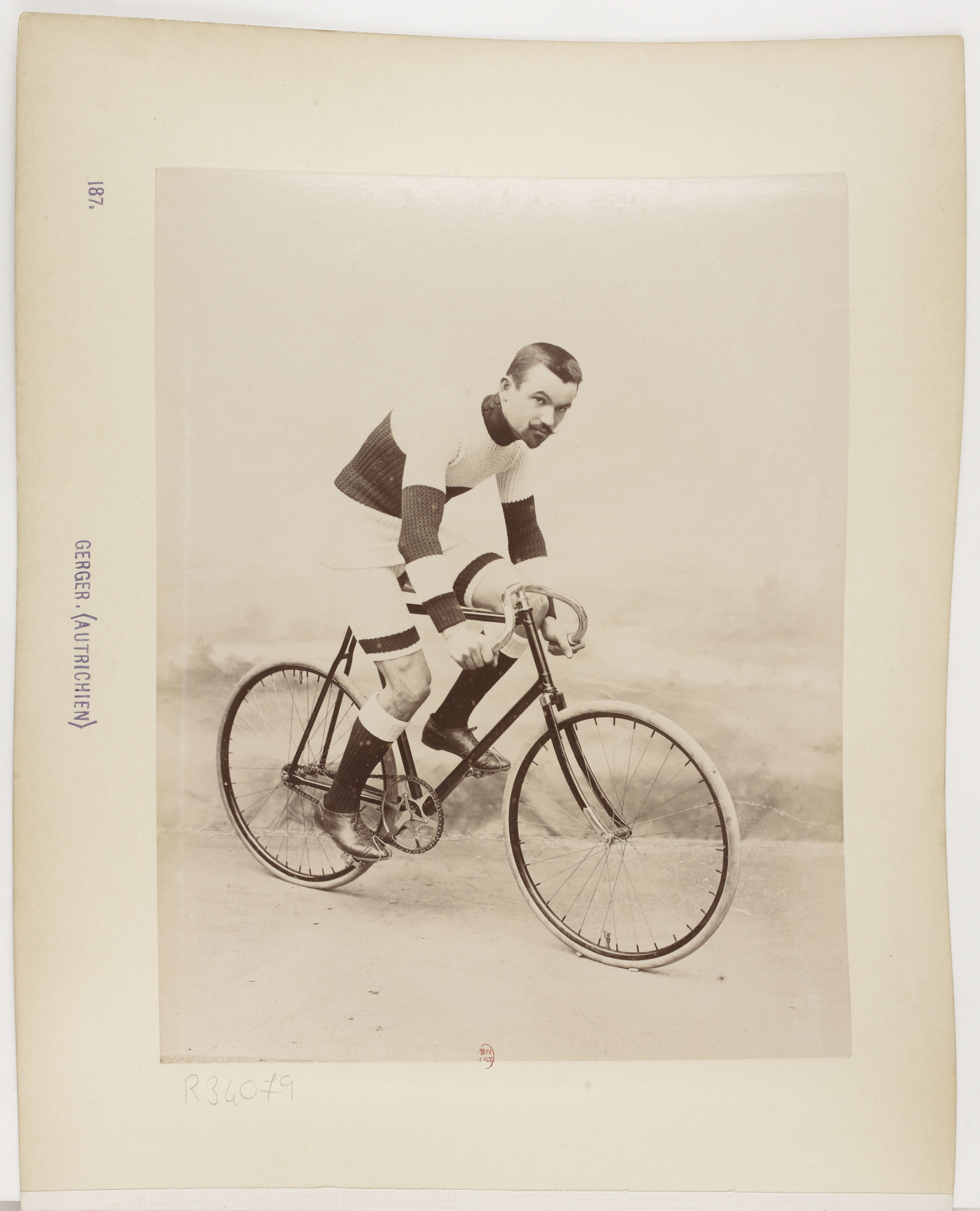
- Franz Gerger

Personal information
- Born: 4 September 1868 Oberradling, Vas, Austria-Hungary
- Died: 27 March 1937 (aged 68)

Sport
- Sport: Cycling
Medal record
Representing Austria-Hungary
World championships (track, professionals)
Bronze medal – third place	1896 Copenhagen	Men's motor-paced
European championships
Gold medal – first place	1897 Copenhagen	Men's motor-paced

Franz Gerger (born 4 September 1868 in Oberradling, Austria-Hungary; died 27 March 1937 in Graz) was an Austrian racing cyclist.

In 1883 Hungary-born Franz Gerger moved to Graz, where, at the age of 22 he learned to ride a bike under Austria's first bike trainer Alexander Gayer. Gerger started his racing career as a road racer. In the long-distance race Wien–Berlin in 1893 he came in third after German star riders Josef Fischer and Georg Sorge on a bike provided by Johann Puch. Being the only one of the top-placed riders who didn't change his bike, a Styria-touring bike, he won a special prize. In the same year he won the 100-kilometer road championship of the Austrian Federation of German riders. In 1894 he took third place in the Mailand-München long-distance race, but his big international breakthrough came in 1895. He signed up for the amateur version of the famous French Bordeaux–Paris race and set a new record time beating all the famous professionals of the time. Later that year he came in second in Straßburg-Basel-Straßburg behind Marius Thé, but ahead of German star Thaddäus Robl and Maurice Garin, who would go on to win several Paris-Roubaix' and the inaugural Tour de France in 1903.

Afterwards Gerger turned Pro and he started specializing in the more lucrative track disciplines. At the 1896 World Championships he won the bronze medal in the motor-pacing event, finishing behind Arthur Adalbert Chase and John William Stocks, and in 1897 he won the European title in the same discipline. During his career Franz Gerger set a total of eight world records. In 1902 he wrapped up his career with a win in the Austrian classic Wien-Semmering-Wien.

After his career he became the representative of a bike manufacturer in Budapest.

== Palmarès ==
1893
3. Wien - Berlin
1. Road Championship of the German Cycling Federation for Austria
1. Graz - Lebring
1. Sankt Andrä - Sankt Pölten - Sankt Andrä
5. Maastricht - Nijmegen - Maastricht

1894
3. Mailand - München

1895
1. Bordeaux - Paris (amateurs, new course record)
2. Straßburg - Basel - Straßburg

1896
3. World Championship - Motor-pacing

1897
1. European Championship - Motor-pacing

1902
1. Wien - Semmering - Wien
