= Sawall =

Sawall is a surname. Notable people with the surname include:

- Walter Sawall (1899–1953), German cyclist
- Willi Sawall (born 1941), Australian race walker
