= Cor Blekemolen =

Dutch cyclist (1894–1972)

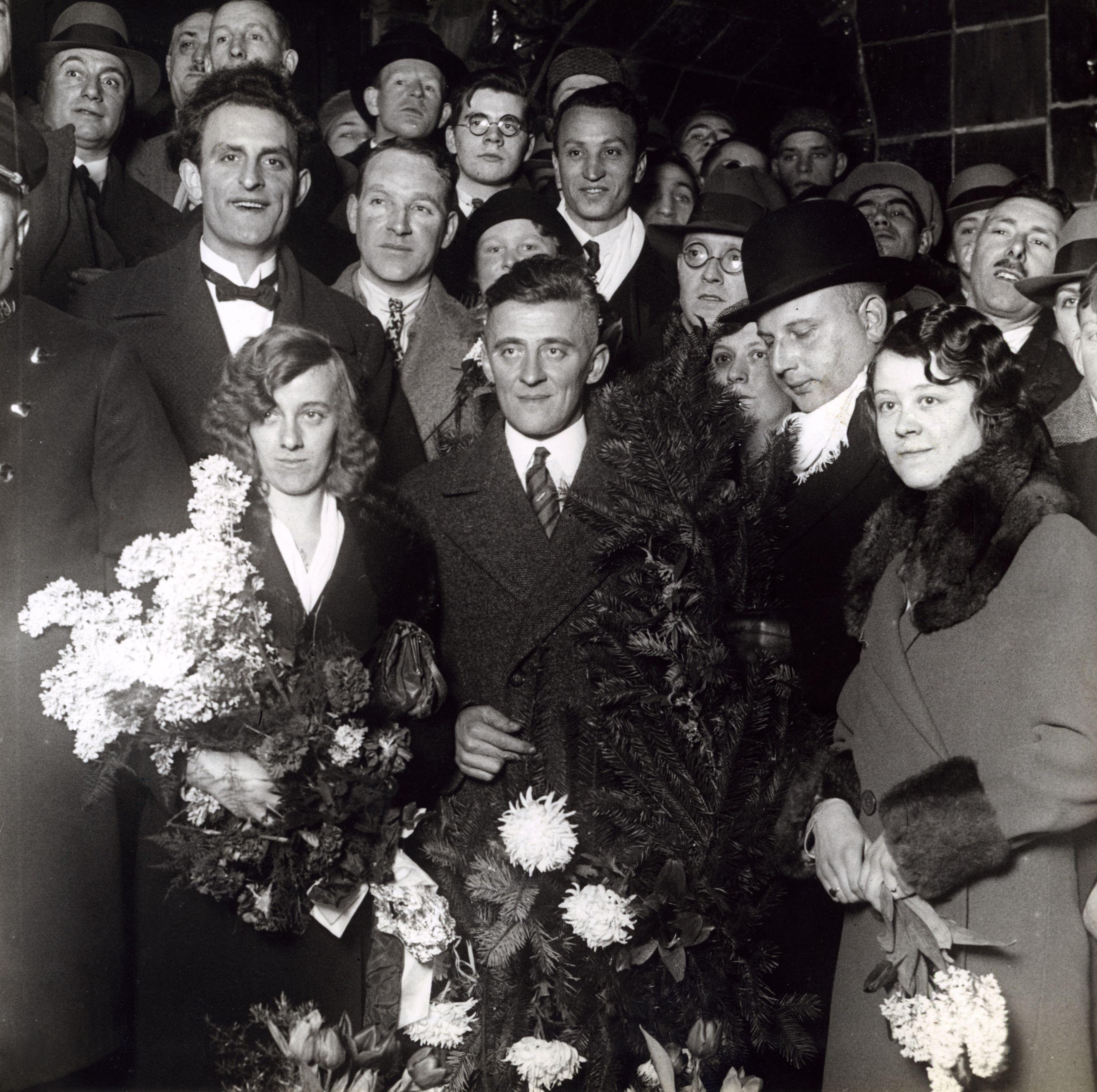
- Cor Blekemolen (center) in 1932

Personal information
- Born: 7 February 1894 Amsterdam, the Netherlands
- Died: 28 November 1972 (aged 76) Hilversum, the Netherlands

Sport
- Sport: Cycling
Medal record
Representing the Netherlands
Motor-paced World Championships
Bronze medal – third place	1913 Leipzig	Amateurs
Gold medal – first place	1914 Copenhagen	Amateurs

Cor Blekemolen "Blekie" (7 February 1894 – 28 November 1972) was a Dutch cyclist. After winning the world title at the UCI Motor-paced World Championships in 1914 he turned professional and competed until 1935. He then became a coach with the Royal Dutch Cycling Union and brought Arie van Houwelingen to the world title in 1959.

== Biography ==
Blekemolen was born to Theodorus Blekemolen and Geertruida Hendrika van Dijen who ran a slaughter house in Amsterdam. He became involved in cycling through working in a bicycle repair shop and through Louis Beisenherz, a neighbor who competed in cycling. He started training in a club in 1909, and in 1912 finished third in the national road-racing championships. During the next two years he won a bronze and a gold medal at the UCI Motor-paced World Championships.

After the World War I he turned professional and won the national titles in motor-paced racing in 1920 and 1931. While he was not a successful rider, he was popular for his style of enjoying and maintaining the process of competition during the race. He was not particularly keen for the final result, and would avoid situations that could lead to a crash.

After retiring in 1935 he briefly worked at the bicycle company De Magneet and then became the manager of the Utrecht Stadium and a coach with the Royal Dutch Cycling Union. He died in 1972 leaving a wife and a daughter.
