= Helsloot =

Helsloot is a Dutch surname. Notable people with the surname include:

- Dries Helsloot (born 1937), Dutch cyclist
- Misja Helsloot (born 1973), Dutch DJ
