= Jean Breuer =

German cyclist (1938–2025)

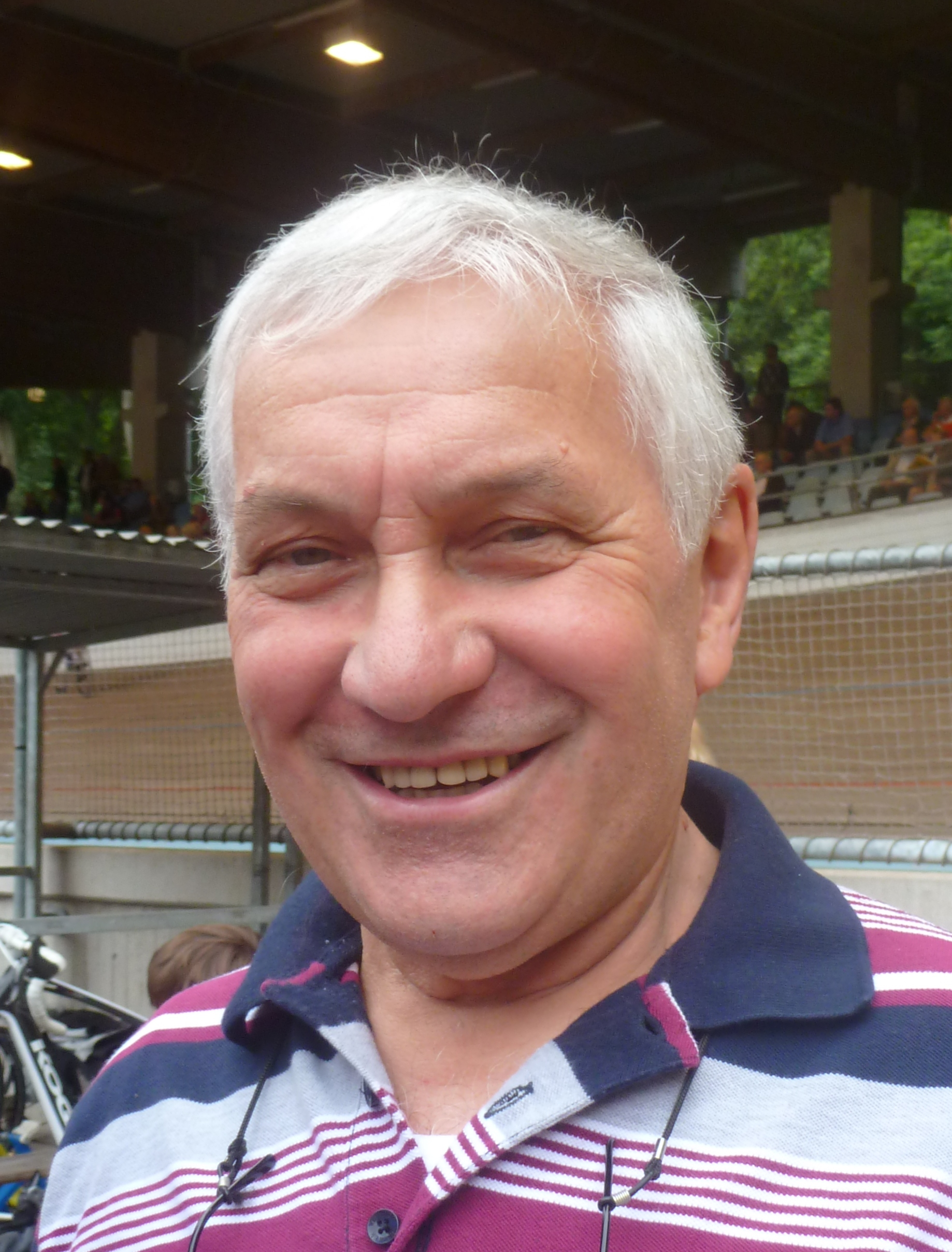
- Breuer in 2011

Personal information
- Born: 1 March 1938 Hürth, Gau Cologne-Aachen, Germany
- Died: 12 April 2025 (aged 87)

Sport
- Sport: Motor-paced racing
Medal record
Representing West Germany
Motor-paced World Championships
Silver medal – second place	1972 Marseille	Amateurs
Gold medal – first place	1974 Montreal	Amateurs
Bronze medal – third place	1975 Liège	Professionals

Jean Breuer (1 March 1938 – 12 April 2025) was a German cyclist who specialised in motor-paced racing. As amateur he won a silver medal at the UCI Motor-paced World Championships in 1972 and a gold medal in 1974. He then changed to professionals and won a bronze medal in 1975.

Breuer died on 12 April 2025, at the age of 87. His son Christoph Breuer is also a competitive cyclist.
