= Elia Frosio =

Italian cyclist

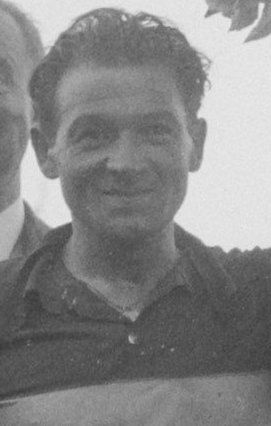
- Frosio in 1948

Personal information
- Born: 22 January 1913 Sant’Omobono Terme, Italy
- Died: 4 February 2005 (aged 92) Paris, France

Cycling career
- Sport: Cycling
- Disciplines: Track; Road
- Role: Rider

Professional team
- 1938–1939: R. Lapébie–Hutchinson
Medal record
Representing Italy
UCI Motor-paced World Championships
Gold medal – first place	1946 Zurich	Professionals
Gold medal – first place	1949 Copenhagen	Professionals
Silver medal – second place	1948 Amsterdam	Professionals

Elia Frosio (22 January 1913 – 4 February 2005) was a professional cyclist from Italy. He started his career in the 1930s as a road racer. After World War II, he changed to motor-paced racing and won every national championship between 1946 and 1950, as well as the world championships in 1946 and 1949.
