= Henri Hens =

Belgian cyclist

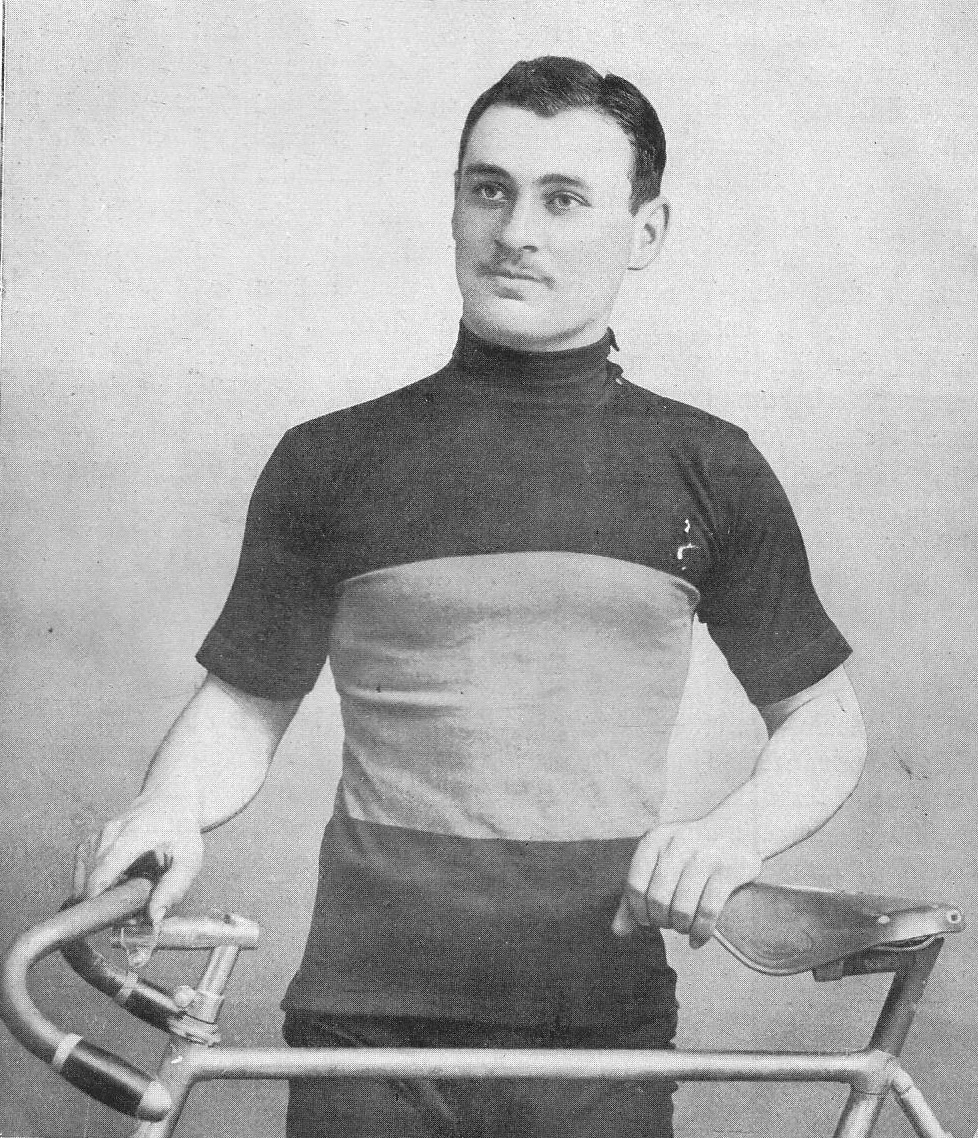

Personal information
- Born: 6 December 1889 Antwerp, Belgium
- Died: 20 February 1963 (aged 73) Antwerp, Belgium

Sport
- Sport: Cycling
Medal record
Representing Belgium
Motor-paced World Championships
Gold medal – first place	1910 Brussels	Amateurs

Henri Hens (6 December 1889 – 20 February 1963) was a Belgian cyclist. In 1910 he won the national and world championships in motor-paced racing.
