= Walter Lohmann (cyclist) =

German cyclist (1911–1993)

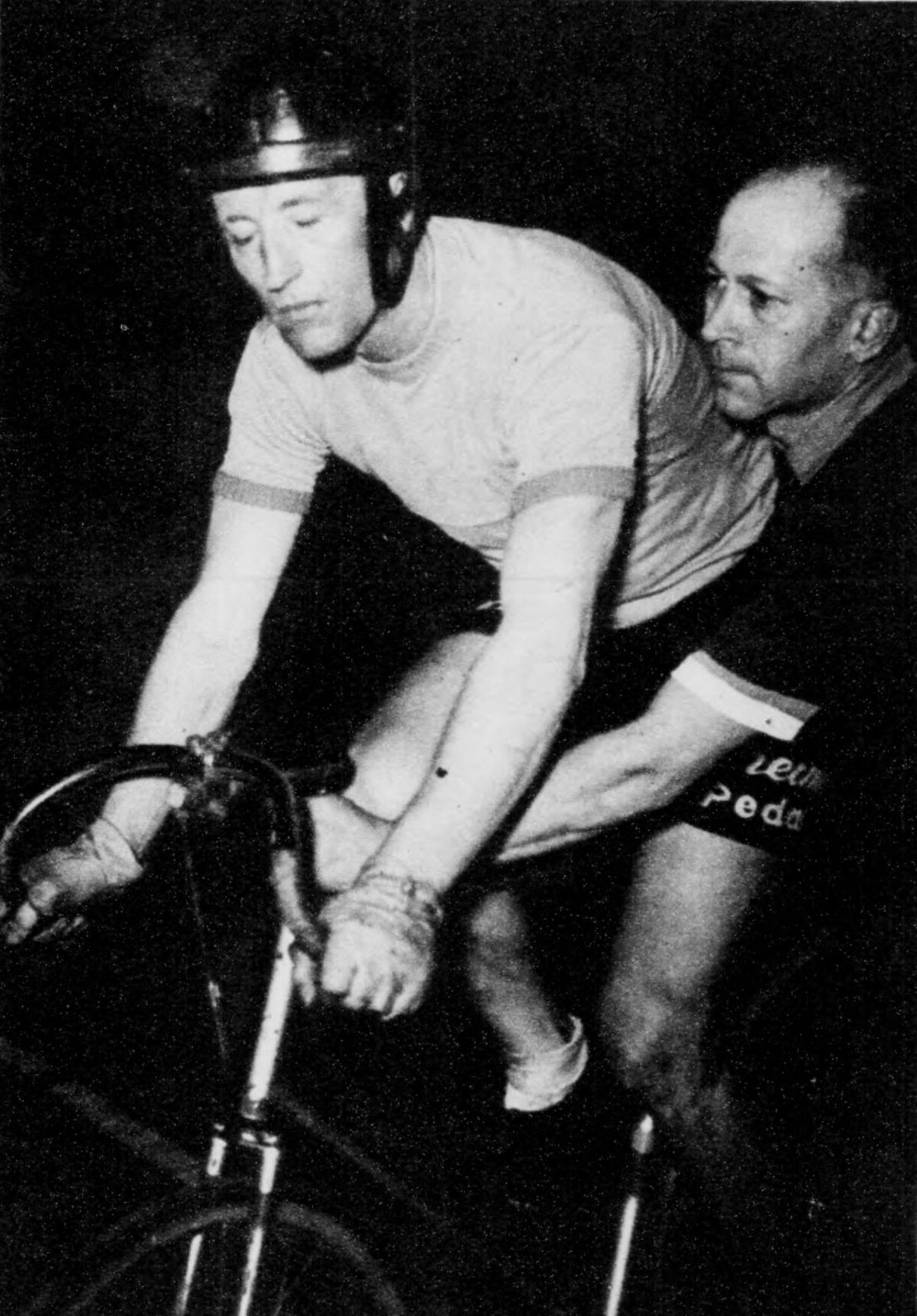

Personal information
- Born: 21 July 1911 Bochum, Germany
- Died: 18 April 1993 (aged 81) Sion, Switzerland

Sport
- Sport: Cycling
Medal record
Representing Germany
UCI Motor-paced World Championships
Gold medal – first place	1937 Copenhagen	Professionals
Silver medal – second place	1938 Amsterdam	Professionals
Silver medal – second place	1952 Paris	Professionals

Walter Lohmann (21 July 1911 – 18 April 1993) was a German professional cyclist who was active between 1932 and 1957. He won the UCI Motor-paced World Championships in 1937.

== Biography ==
As a teenager he was interested in football and athletics and attended a trade school. In 1927, he started training in road racing. In 1932, he won the Berlin–Cottbus–Berlin, Bochum-Münster-Bochum, and Dortmund races and finished in sixth place in the UCI Road World Championships. Two years later he won the six-day race of Berlin and changed to motor-paced racing. In this discipline, between 1935 and 1953 he won 10 national titles and finished three times in second place. He also won the UCI Motor-paced World Championships in 1937 and finished in second place in 1938 and 1952.

In 1954, he was suspended for approximately one year after a quarrel with Gustav Kilian, a cyclist, and Otto Weckerling, the manager of a six-day race, whom he accused of manipulating the competition. On 24 October 1955, aged 44, he set two world records: in 100 km (at 1:03'40") and in one-hour race (at 96.016 km). On 16 September 1957, Lohmann drove his farewell race at the velodrom of Frankfurt.

After retirement he opened a restaurant in the center of Bochum, he also owned a gasoline station. For a few months he worked as a national head coach, but resigned because of disputes with the German Cycling Federation. In 1979, he received serious injuries in a skiing accident and required nursing care from his wife Irmgard. He died in 1993.
