= Martin Wierstra =

Dutch cyclist (1928–1985)

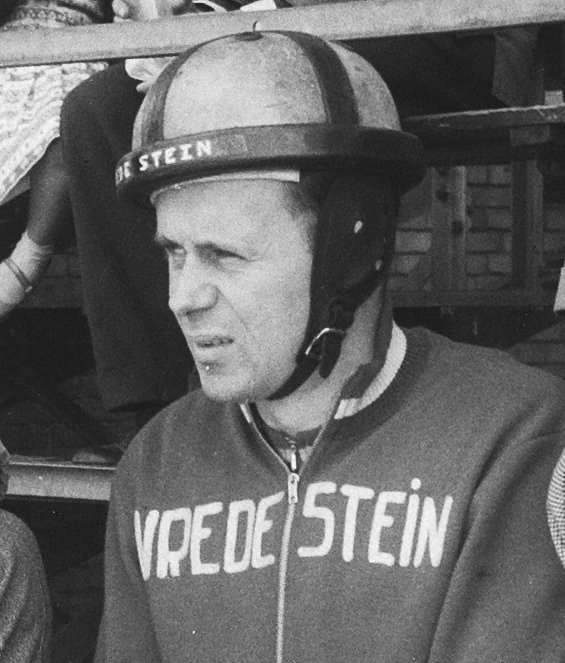

Personal information
- Born: 29 May 1928 Amsterdam, the Netherlands
- Died: 23 October 1985 (aged 57) Amsterdam, the Netherlands

Sport
- Sport: Cycling
Medal record
Representing the Netherlands
UCI Motor-paced World Championships
Silver medal – second place	1960 Leipzig	Professionals

Martin Wierstra (29 May 1928 – 23 October 1985) was a professional cyclist from the Netherlands who specialized in motor-paced racing. In this discipline he won three national titles in 1957, 1960 and 1961, as well as a silver medal at the UCI Motor-paced World Championships in 1960.

After retirement in 1962 he worked as a pharmacy salesman and cycling coach.
