= Gaby Minneboo =

Dutch cyclist

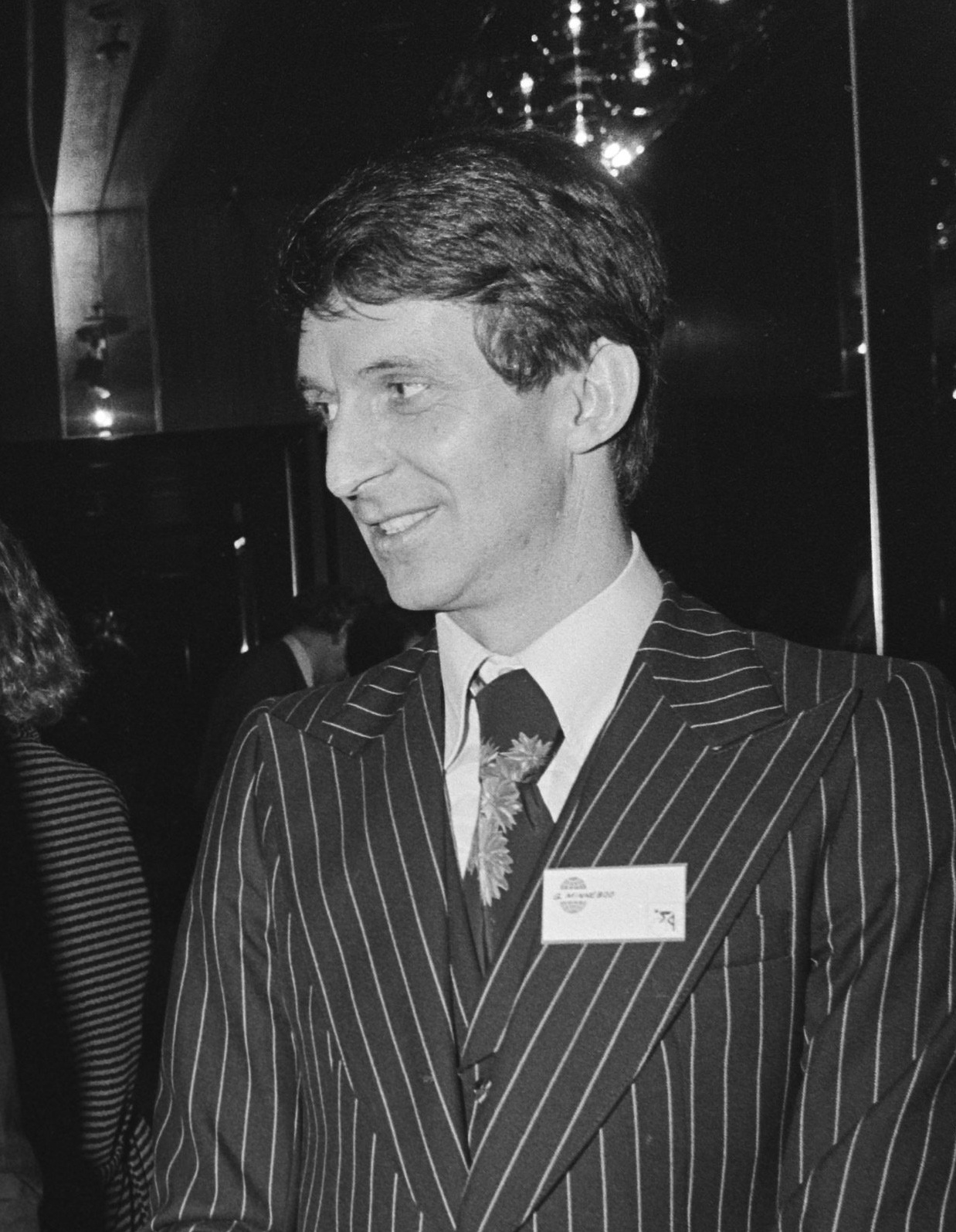
- Gaby Minneboo in 1981

Personal information
- Born: 12 June 1945 (age 81) Veere, Netherlands

Sport
- Sport: Motor-paced racing
Medal record
Representing the Netherlands
World Championships
Bronze medal – third place	1972 Marseille	Amateurs
Bronze medal – third place	1973 San Sebastian	Amateurs
Gold medal – first place	1975 Liège	Amateurs
Gold medal – first place	1976 Monteroni di Lecce	Amateurs
Gold medal – first place	1977 San Cristòbal	Amateurs
Bronze medal – third place	1979 Amsterdam	Amateurs
Gold medal – first place	1980 Besancon	Amateurs
Gold medal – first place	1982 Leicester	Amateurs

Gabriël Alphonse Alexander (Gaby) Minneboo (born 12 June 1945) is a retired cyclist from the Netherlands who won the Amateur UCI Motor-paced World Championships in 1975–1977, 1980 and 1982. He finished in third place in 1972, 1973 and 1979. After retiring in 1983 he founded a company manufacturing sports trophies and awards.
