= Domenico De Lillo =

Italian cyclist

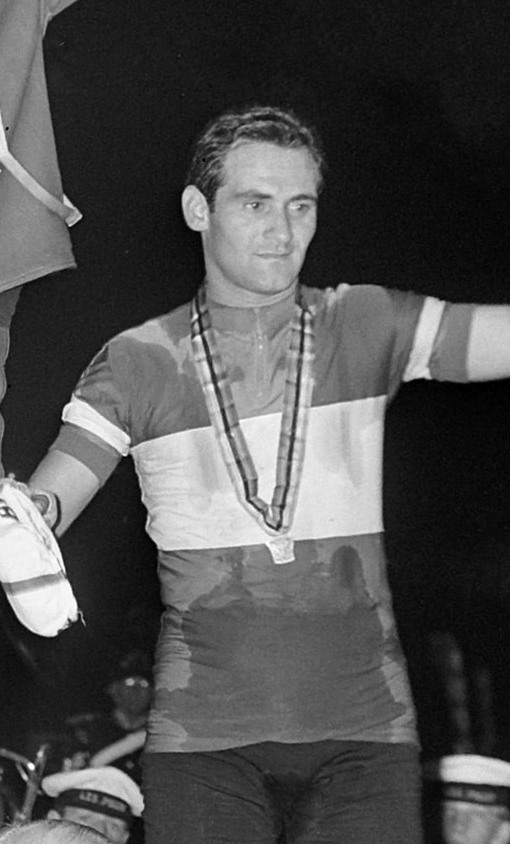
- Domenico de Lillo in Amsterdam in 1967

Personal information
- Born: 30 August 1937 (age 88) Milan, Italy

Sport
- Sport: Cycling
Medal record
Representing Italy
UCI Motor-paced World Championships
Bronze medal – third place	1967 Amsterdam	professionals
Bronze medal – third place	1969 Brno	professionals
Bronze medal – third place	1971 Varese	professionals

Domenico De Lillo (born 30 August 1937) is a retired cyclist from Italy who specialized in motor-paced racing. In this discipline he won three bronze medals at the world championships in 1967, 1969 and 1971, as well as the national titles in 1959–1961, 1965–1967 and 1969–1971.

He was born to Pasquale and Emma De Lillo in Milan. His father was a fan of cycling and took his son to velodroms from the infant age. He started training at the age of 15 but could not ride behind motorcycles because Italian regulations allowed to do so only from age 18. Between 1959 and 1971 De Lillo was the best motor-paced racer in Italy and a strong contender internationally. After retirement in 1976 he stayed with cycling, first as a pacer and then as a functionary. From 1986 to 1989, he managed the Bianchi cycling team, and since 1994 he is a member of the technical committee of the Italian Federation of Professional Cycling.

He is married to Rosalba. For more than 40 years they run a small shop selling tobacco, coffee and Swiss chocolate, watches and knives.
