= Bert Boom =

Dutch cyclist (born 1938)

Personal information
- Born: 6 May 1938 (age 88) Markelo, the Netherlands

Sport
- Sport: Motor-paced racing
Medal record
Representing the Netherlands
Motor-paced World Championships
Gold medal – first place	1969 Brno	Amateurs
Bronze medal – third place	1971 Varese	Amateurs

Albertus "Bert" Boom (born 6 May 1938) is a retired cyclist from the Netherlands. He won the UCI Motor-paced World Championships in 1969 and finished in third place in 1971.

He competed until 1980 but with less success. After retiring he worked as a technician with professional cycling teams and ran a bicycle shop Bert Boom Race. Around 1987 he became a promoting agent with Gazelle and Shimano. Later he worked as technical assistant for disabled basketball teams (wheelchairs) and cyclists and in this capacity was involved in international competitions and the 1996 Summer Olympics.

His brothers Hans and Henk and son Bart are retired road cyclists.
