= Miguel Mas (cyclist) =

Spanish cyclist

Personal information
- Born: 13 July 1943 (age 82) Manacor, Spain

Sport
- Sport: Cycling
Medal record
Representing Spain
UCI Motor-paced World Championships
Gold medal – first place	1965 San Sebastian	Amateurs

Miguel Mas Gayà (born 13 July 1943) is a retired Spanish cyclist who won the UCI Motor-paced World Championships in 1965. He won the national titles in motor-paced racing in 1962–1964 and in individual pursuit in 1964. He retired in 1967, aged 24, due to illness.
