= Paul Suter =

Swiss cyclist

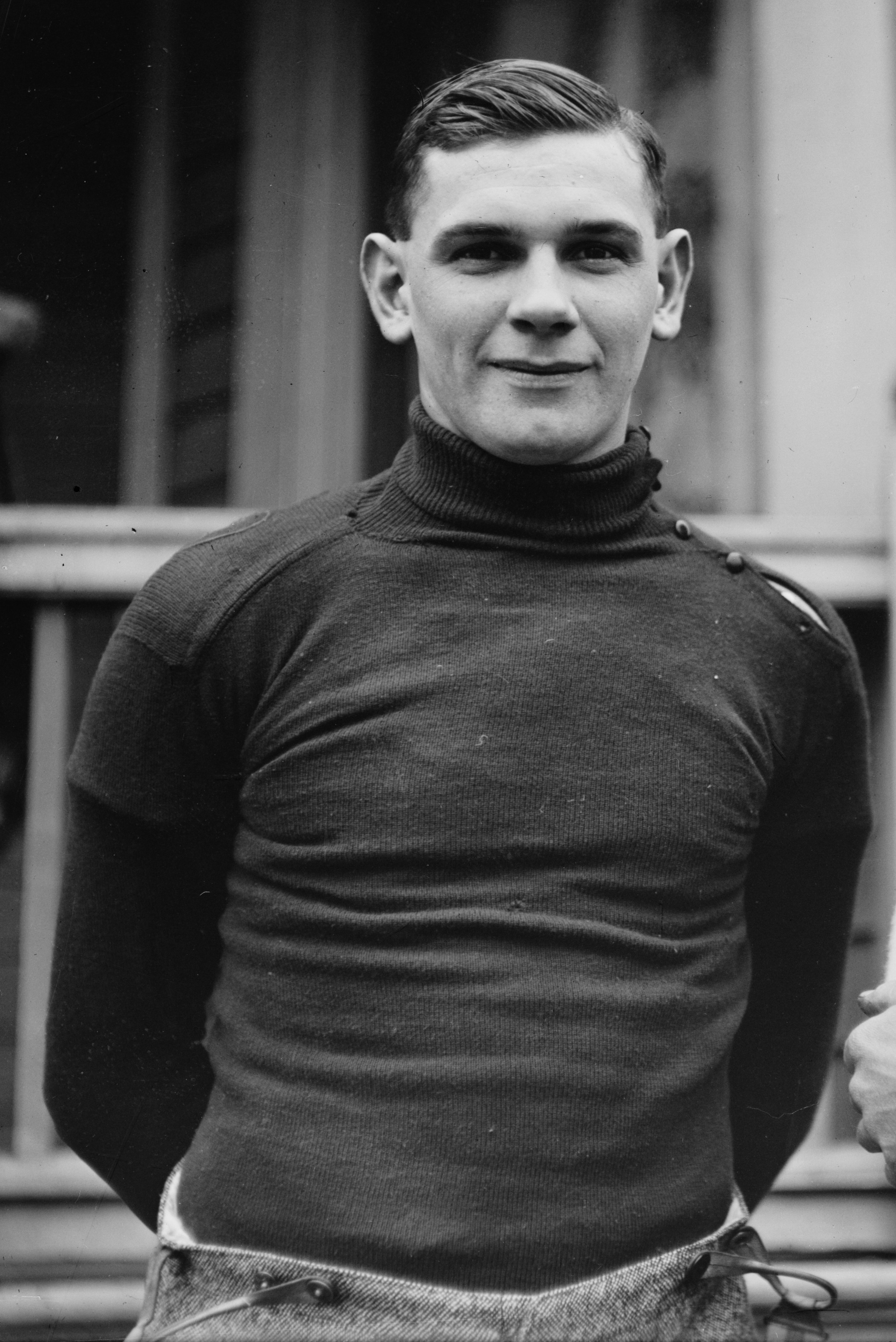
- Paul Suter in 1912

Personal information
- Born: 9 March 1892 Gränichen, Switzerland
- Died: 6 April 1966 (aged 74) Paris, France

Sport
- Sport: Cycling
Medal record
Representing Switzerland
Motor-paced World Championships
Bronze medal – third place	1920 Antwerp	Professionals
Silver medal – second place	1921 Copenhagen	Professionals
Silver medal – second place	1922 Paris	Professionals
Gold medal – first place	1923 Zurich	Professionals
Bronze medal – third place	1926 Milan	Professionals

Paul Suter (9 March 1892 – 6 April 1966) was a Swiss cyclist. Between 1920 and 1926 he won five medals at the UCI Motor-paced World Championships, including a gold medal in 1923. He also won seven national titles in motor-paced racing (1920, 1921, 1923–1927).

Sutter had five brothers (Max, Franz, Fritz, Gottfried und Heiri), all competitive cyclists. In 1911, Paul and Franz together won the six-day race of Hamburg. Franz died in 1914 after being hit by a train while crossing a rail line, in front of Paul's eyes.
