= Victor Linart =

Belgian cyclist

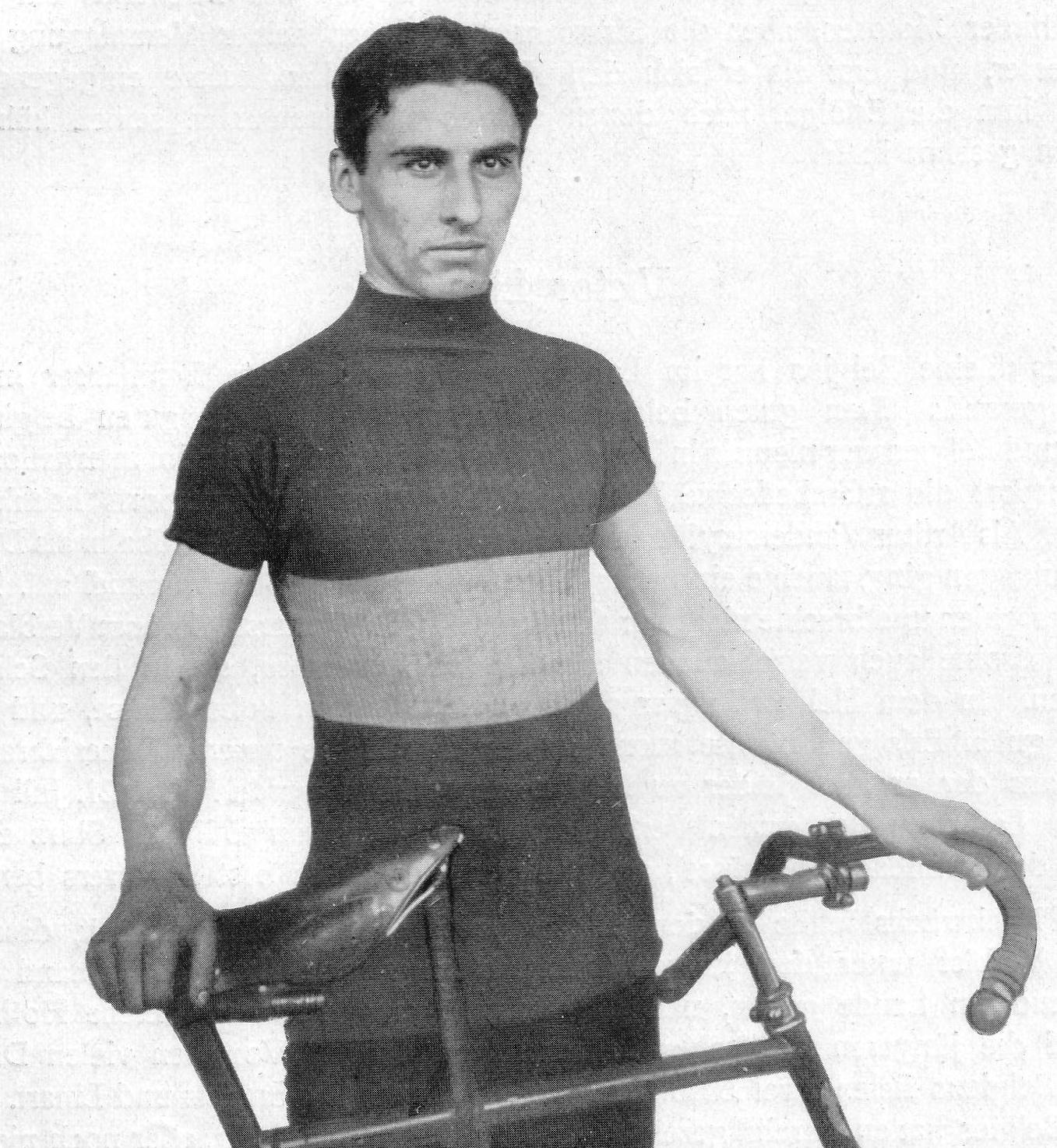

Personal information
- Born: 26 May 1889 Floreffe, Belgium
- Died: 23 October 1977 (aged 88) Verneuil-sur-Avre, France

Sport
- Sport: Cycling
Medal record
Representing Belgium
Motor-paced World Championships
Silver medal – second place	1920 Antwerp	Professionals
Gold medal – first place	1921 Copenhagen	Professionals
Gold medal – first place	1924 Paris	Professionals
Gold medal – first place	1926 Milan	Professionals
Gold medal – first place	1927 Cologne	Professionals
Bronze medal – third place	1928 Budapest	Professionals
Silver medal – second place	1929 Zurich	Professionals
Bronze medal – third place	1931 Copenhagen	Professionals

Victor Linart (26 May 1889 – 23 October 1977) was a Belgian cyclist. Between 1920 and 1931 he won four UCI Motor-paced World Championships in the professionals division and finished four times in second or third place.

He won his first bicycle race at the age 14, and around that time worked at an ice cream shop making use of his beautiful handwriting. After fighting in World War I he focused on professional cycling. During his career he won 15 national titles (1913–1931) and one unofficial European championship. He was nicknamed "sioux" (by Michel Berthet) due to his dark skin color and nose shape, which was flattened in a fall in 1912. He retired in 1933 and moved to Verneuil-sur-Avre, France, and ran a sawmill nearby. He married Yvonne Cailleaud with whom he had a daughter Monique and son Hubert. For his cycling achievements he was made a knight of the Order of Leopold II. A street is named after him in his native Floreffe and in Verneuil-sur-Avre where he died in 1977.
