= Robert Grassin =

French cyclist

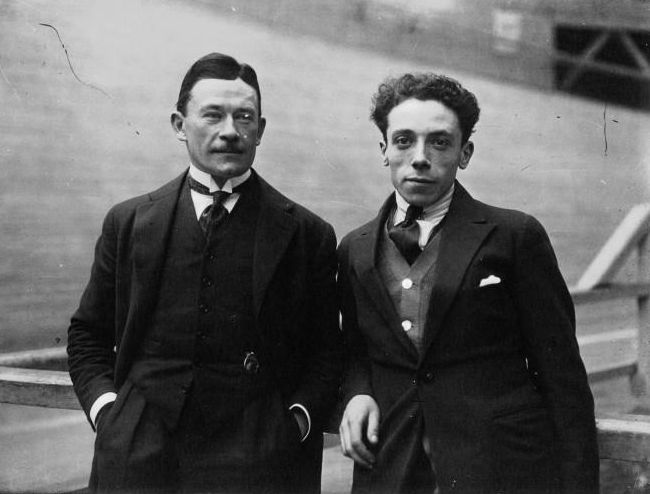
- Robert Grassin (right) with coach Léon Didier in 1922

Personal information
- Born: 17 September 1898 Le Mans, France
- Died: 26 June 1980 (aged 81) Gien, France

Sport
- Sport: Cycling
Medal record
Representing France
UCI Motor-paced World Championships
Gold medal – first place	1925 Amsterdam	Professionals
Bronze medal – third place	1930 Brussels	Professionals

Robert "Toto" Grassin (17 September 1898 – 26 June 1980) was a French cyclist who specialized in motor-paced racing. In this discipline he won the national championships in 1924 and the UCI Motor-paced World Championships in 1925.
