= Peter Steiger =

Swiss cyclist

Personal information
- Born: 23 January 1960 (age 66) Schlatt bei Winterthur, Switzerland

Cycling career
- Sport: Cycling
- Current team: Retired
- Disciplines: Track; Road
- Role: Rider
Medal record
Representing Switzerland
UCI Motor-paced World Championships
Silver medal – second place	1990 Maebashi	Professionals
Silver medal – second place	1991 Stuttgart	Professionals
Gold medal – first place	1992 Valencia	Professionals

Peter Steiger (born 23 January 1960) is a retired Swiss cyclist. Between 1984 and 1991 he won seven national championships in motor-paced racing. In this discipline he also won the world championships in 1992 and finished in second place in 1990 and 1991. Steiger was also a successful road racer and won the Bay Classic Series in 1989.

In March 1993 he was hit by a truck during training in Mexico and had to retire due to injuries.
