= Fritz Ryser =

Swiss cyclist

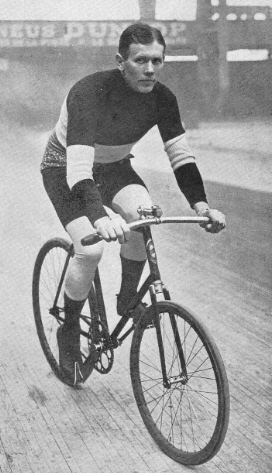

Personal information
- Born: 26 May 1873 Huttwil, Switzerland
- Died: 13 February 1916 (aged 42) Berlin, Germany

Sport
- Sport: Cycling
Medal record
Representing Switzerland
Motor-paced World Championships
Bronze medal – third place	1901 Berlin	Professionals
Gold medal – first place	1908 Berlin	Professionals

Fritz Ryser (26 May 1873 – 13 February 1916) was a Swiss cyclist. He won the UCI Motor-paced World Championships in 1908 and finished in third place in 1901.

Ryser started with road racing and won a national title in 1899. The same year he turned professional and won a national title in motor-paced racing. Although in 1908 he became the first Swiss cyclist to win a world title in this discipline, his career was marred with bad luck. Eight days after the race, his pacer Joseph Black died in a race in Düsseldorf. Next year Ryser himself got into a serious accident in Berlin – his pacer Emil Borchardt while trying to avoid a fallen rider hit the stands; his motorcycle exploded killing nine people. Shortly after the outbreak of World War I, Ryser was detained for alleged espionage while racing in Poland, whereas his pacemaker was deported to Siberia. Ryser died from a stroke in Berlin, aged 42.
