= Leendert van der Meulen =

Dutch cyclist (1937–2015)

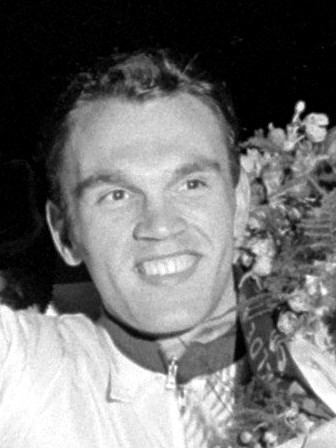
- Van der Mulen in 1961

Personal information
- Born: 22 November 1937 Badhoevedorp, Netherlands
- Died: 2 September 2015 (aged 77)

Sport
- Sport: Motor-paced racing
Medal record
Representing the Netherlands
Motor-paced World Championships
Gold medal – first place	1961 Zurich	Amateurs

Leendert "Leen" van der Meulen (22 November 1937 – 2 September 2015) was a cyclist from the Netherlands. After winning the 1961 UCI Motor-paced World Championships in the amateurs category he turned professional and finished in second place at the national championships in 1962.
