= Paul Krewer =

German cyclist (1906–2000)

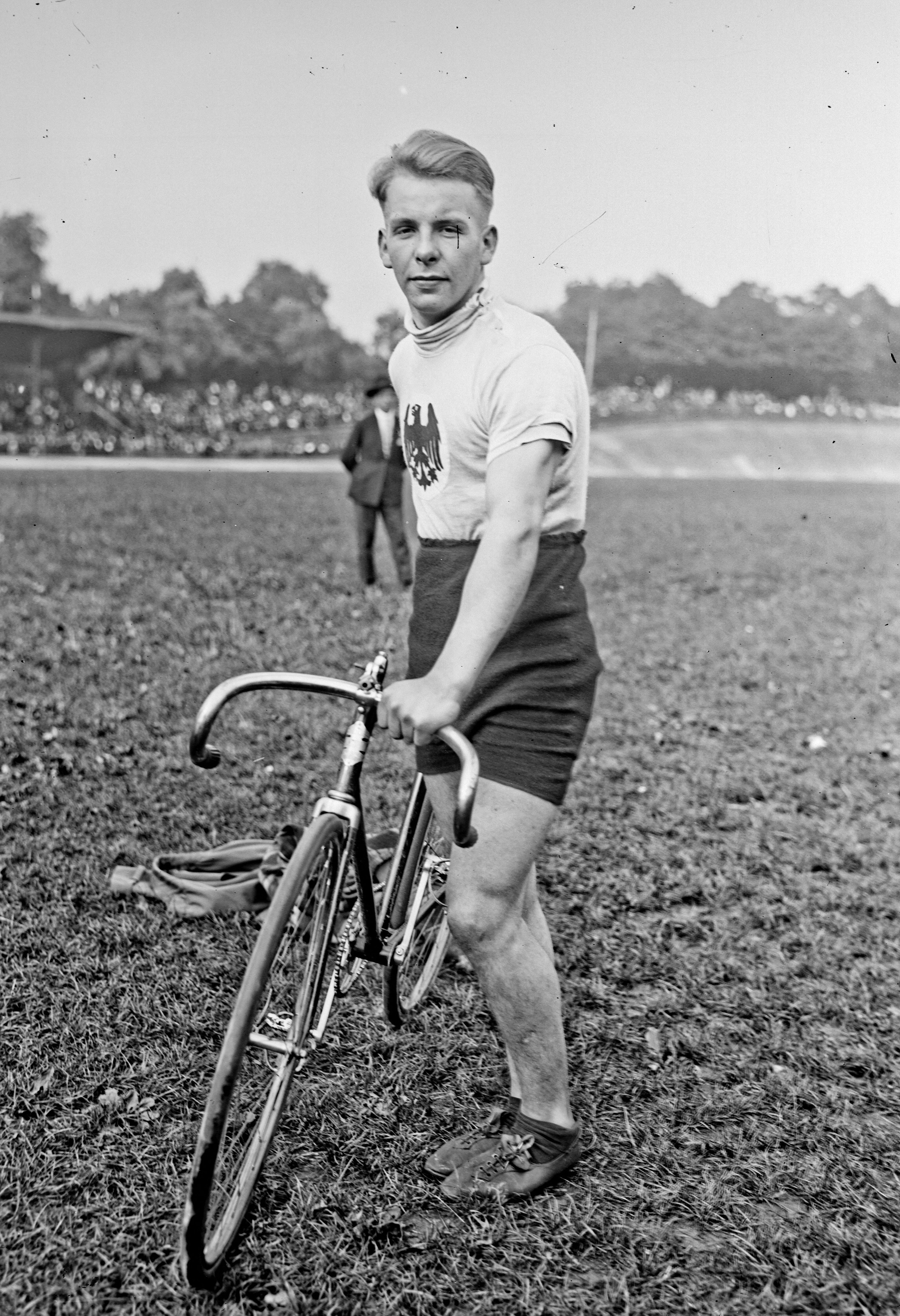
- Krewer in 1925

Personal information
- Born: 10 June 1906 Duisburg, Germany
- Died: 2000 (aged approximately 94) Cologne, Germany

Sport
- Sport: Cycling
Medal record
Representing Germany
UCI Motor-paced World Championships
Silver medal – second place	1927 Cologne	Professionals
Bronze medal – third place	1929 Zurich	Professionals
Silver medal – second place	1934 Leipzig	Professionals

Paul Krewer (10 June 1906 – 2000) was a German professional cyclist who won two silver and one bronze medals at the UCI Motor-paced World Championships in 1927, 1929 and 1934.

After attending a school in Duisburg, he moved to Cologne to work at his father's bicycle shop. There, aged 16, he started biking. In 1926 he turned professional and by then was a top German cyclist. In 1927 he won his first medal at the world championships riding with pacer Christian Junggeburth. In 1929 while driving in a car in Bonn they crashed into a tram. Junggeburth was seriously injured and died several days later in a hospital of blood poisoning.

Krewer died aged 94, nearly forgotten in Cologne. His elder brother Hans was also a cyclist. He died of appendicitis in 1933, aged 20.
