= Michail Markov =

Russian cyclist

Personal information
- Born: 1938
- Died: 5 May 2010 (aged 71) Moscow, Russia

Sport
- Sport: Cycling
Medal record
Representing the Soviet Union
UCI Motor-paced World Championships
Silver medal – second place	1967 Amsterdam	Amateurs

Michail Gerasimovich Markov (Russian: Михаил Герасимович Марков; 1938 – 5 May 2012) was a Russian cyclist who won a silver medal at the UCI Motor-paced World Championships in 1967. This was the only medal for the Soviet Unions in the entire history of those championships.

After winning a national title in 1959 in the 100 km team pursuit, he changed to motor-paced racing. In this event he won a medal at every national championship between 1961 and 1976, including 11 consecutive gold medals between 1966 and 1976. In 1977 he retired from competitions and for several decades worked as a cycling coach at CSKA Moscow.
