= Paul Depaepe =

Belgian cyclist

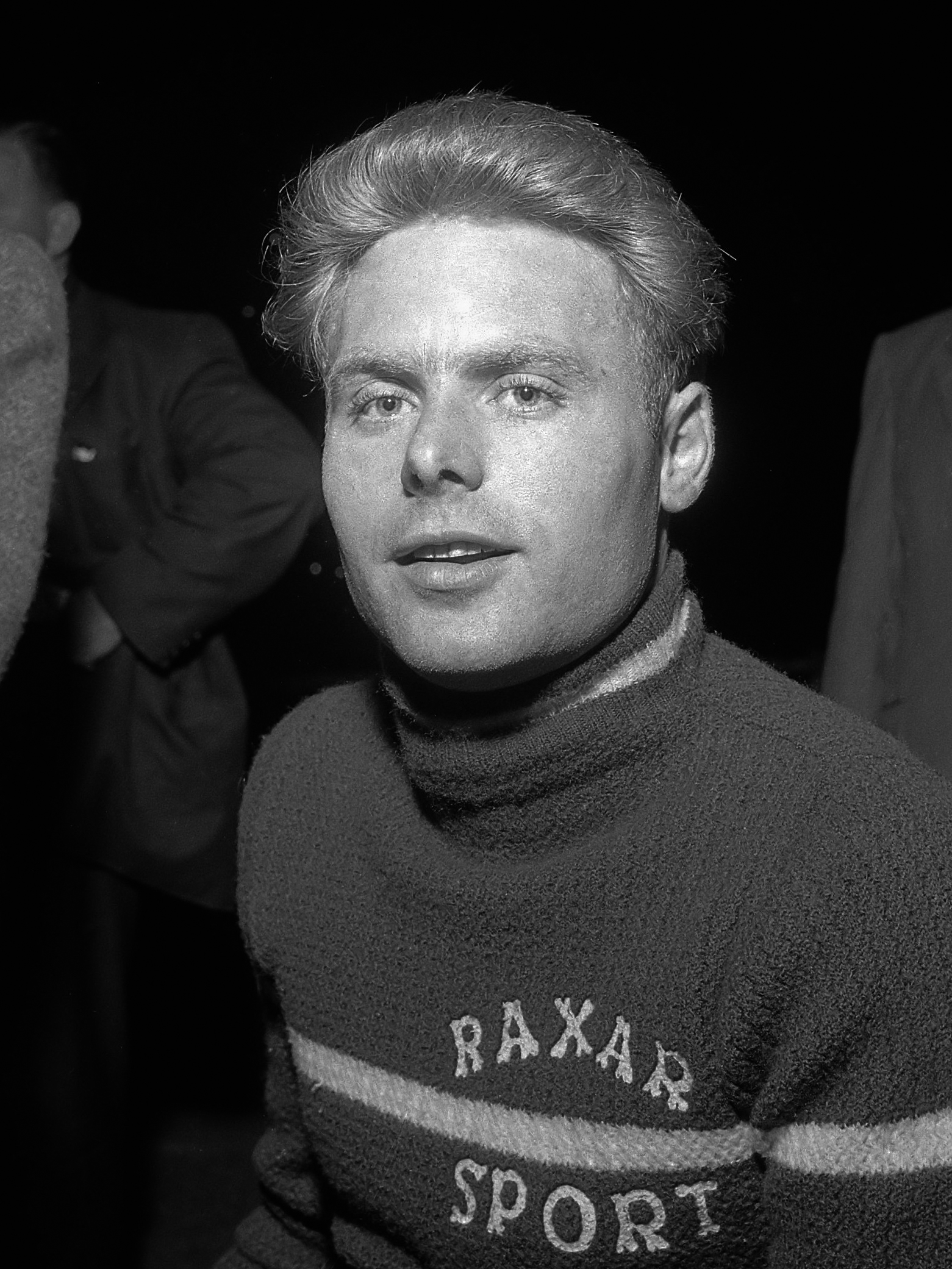
- Paul Depaepe (1957)

Personal information
- Born: 12 October 1931 (age 94) Deurne, Belgium

Sport
- Sport: Cycling
Medal record
Representing Belgium
Motor-paced World Championships
Gold medal – first place	1957 Rocourt	Professionals
Silver medal – second place	1961 Zurich	Professionals
Silver medal – second place	1962 Milan	Professionals
Silver medal – second place	1963 Rocourt	Professionals

Paul Depaepe (born 12 October 1931) is a Belgian former professional cyclist and world champion. He competed in the 4,000 metres team pursuit event at the 1952 Summer Olympics. He competed in motor-paced racing in the professionals category and won the European championships in 1961–1963 and the world championships in 1957; he finished in second place in the world championships in 1961–1963. He retired in 1965 after a serious back injury during training.

In 1946–1947, he was a successful cross country runner, but changed to cycling. As a road cyclist, he competed in 23 six-day races, with the best result of second place in the race of Antwerp in 1959.

He is married to Liane and had a son who died in 2001.
