= Walter Brugna =

Italian cyclist

Personal information
- Born: 28 January 1965 (age 61) Rivolta d'Adda, Italy

Sport
- Sport: Cycling
Medal record
Representing Italy
UCI Motor-paced World Championships
Bronze medal – third place	1988 Ghent	professionals
Silver medal – second place	1989 Lyon	professionals
Gold medal – first place	1990 Maebashi	professionals

Walter Brugna (born 28 January 1965) is a retired professional cyclist from Italy. He won three medals at the UCI Motor-paced World Championships, including a gold in 1990. As a road cyclist, he won three stages of the Herald Sun Tour in 1987 and three stages of the Vuelta a la Argentina in 1991.

His son Alessio (b. 1995) is also a competitive cyclist.
