= Erich Möller =

German cyclist (1905–1964)

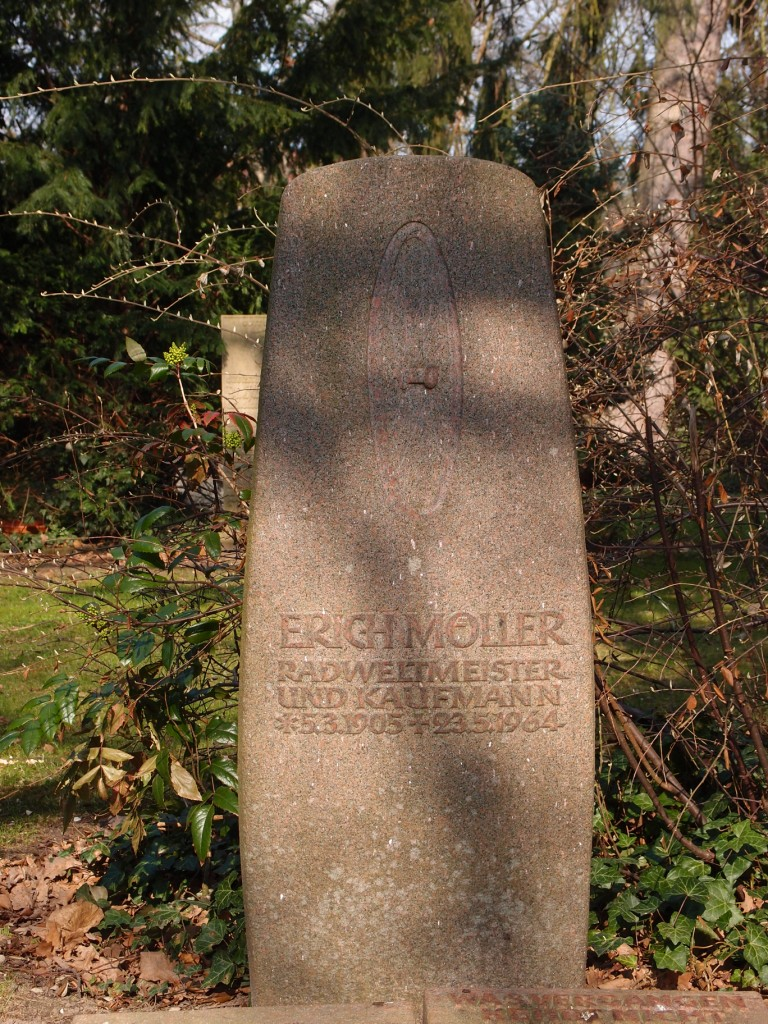
- Memorial of Möller Erich Hannover

Personal information
- Born: 3 May 1905 Hannover, Germany
- Died: 24 May 1964 (aged 59) Bad Harzburg, Germany

Sport
- Sport: Cycling
Medal record
Representing Germany
UCI Motor-paced World Championships
Gold medal – first place	1930 Brussels	Professionals
Silver medal – second place	1931 Copenhagen	Professionals
Bronze medal – third place	1932 Rome	Professionals

Erich Möller (3 May 1905 – 24 May 1964) was a German cyclist. He won a gold, silver and bronze medal at the UCI Motor-paced World Championships in 1930, 1931 and 1932, respectively.

He started competing at age 15, mostly in road cycling. In 1922, he finished third in the national road championships, and won them in 1924. In 1925, he changed to professional motor-paced cycling and was a world leading competitor in this discipline in 1930–1932. He retired in 1937 and opened several bicycle shops in Hannover, where after World War II he was producing and selling his own "Möller" bikes. In addition, he initiated and supported cycling events and worked as a cycling functionary. In 1948, he became the first post-war president of the German cycling federation.
