= Horst Gnas =

German cyclist

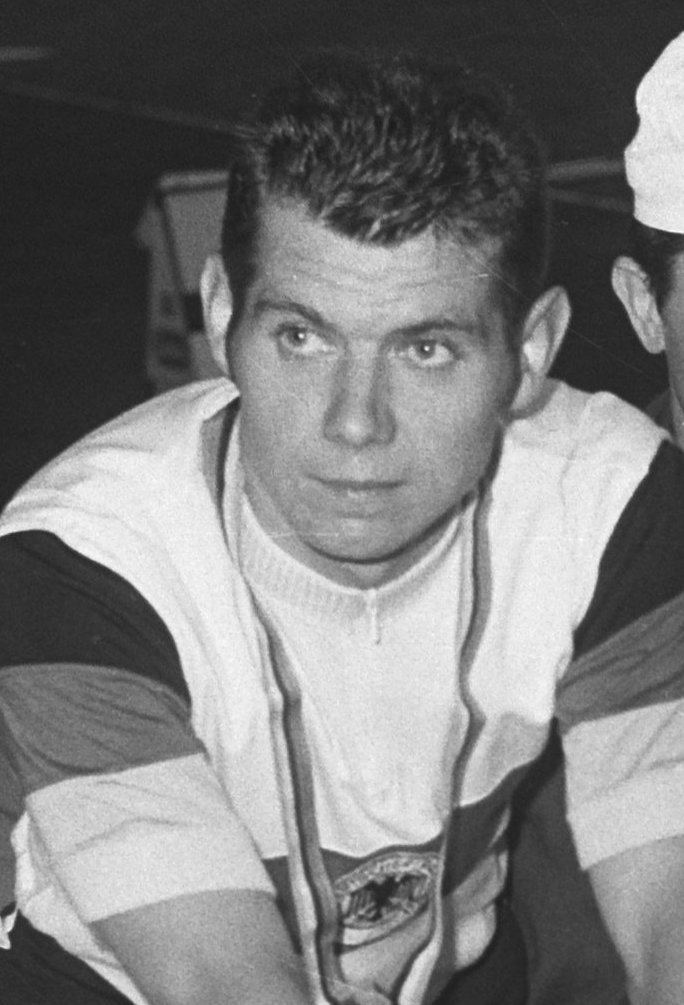
- Horst Gnas in 1970

Personal information
- Born: 3 September 1941 (age 84) Dessau, Germany

Sport
- Sport: Motor-paced racing
Medal record
Representing West Germany
World Championships
Silver medal – second place	1970 Leicester	Amateur
Gold medal – first place	1971 Varese	Amateur
Gold medal – first place	1972 Marseille	Amateur
Gold medal – first place	1973 San Sebastian	Amateur

Horst Gnas (born 3 September 1941) is a retired German cyclist who specialized in motor-paced racing. In this discipline he won the UCI Motor-paced World Championships in 1971-1973 and finished second in 1970. He teamed with the famous Dutch pacer Bruno Walrave.

His wife was fatally injured in a car accident while he was competing at the 1973 World Championships, leaving him with two daughters of eight and ten years old. Gnas retired from competitions in 1977 due to injuries, remarried, and opened two cleaning companies in Nuremberg and Röthenbach an der Pegnitz. His second wife Renata died in October 2008 of a sudden organ failure.
