= Jan de Nijs =

Dutch cyclist

Personal information
- Born: 25 January 1958 (age 68) Amsterdam, the Netherlands

Sport
- Sport: Cycling
Medal record
Representing the Netherlands
Motor-paced World Championships
| Gold medal – first place | 1984 Barcelona | Amateurs |

Jan de Nijs (born 25 January 1958) is a retired cyclist from the Netherlands. He began as a road racer and won the national team championships in 1983. He then focused on motor-paced racing and won every national championship between 1984 and 1990; in 1984 he also won the UCI Motor-paced World Championships.
