= Jan Pronk (cyclist) =

Dutch cyclist (1918–2016)

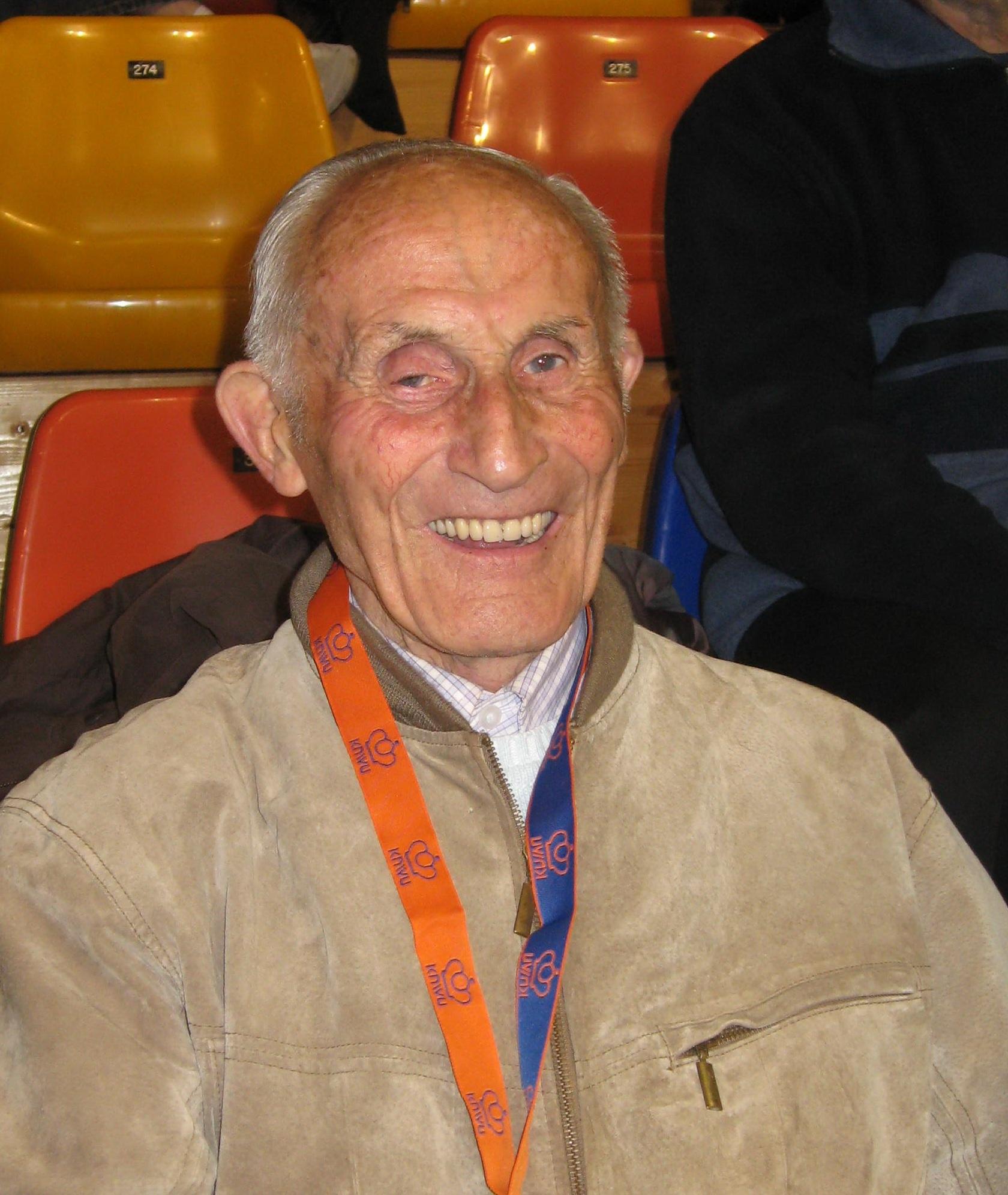
- Jan Pronk in 2007

Personal information
- Born: 19 October 1918 Den Helder, Netherlands
- Died: 15 March 2016 (aged 97) Egmond aan Zee, Netherlands

Sport
- Sport: Cycling
Medal record
Representing the Netherlands
UCI Motor-paced World Championships
Bronze medal – third place	1947 Paris	Professionals
Silver medal – second place	1949 Copenhagen	Professionals
Silver medal – second place	1950 Rocourt	Professionals
Gold medal – first place	1951 Milan	Professionals
Silver medal – second place	1954 Cologne	Professionals

Jan Pronk (19 October 1918 – 15 March 2016) was a Dutch professional cyclist who specialized in motor-paced racing. In this discipline he won five medals at the world championships, including a gold medal in 1951.

That gold medal was controversial because of the assistance of his compatriot Kees Bakker. At the end of the race, Bakker, a 35-year-old veteran at the time, was exactly one lap behind Pronk, who was in the lead. Then, up to the finish line, Bakker rode behind Pronk, covering him from attacks by the competitors. There were speculations that Bakker was paid by Pronk before the race; nevertheless, these tactics were then banned at competitions.
