= Georges Parent (cyclist) =

French cyclist (1885-1918)

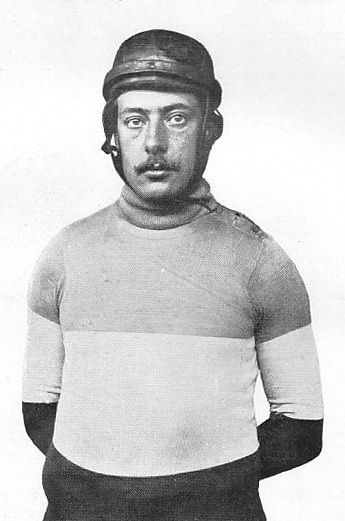

Personal information
- Born: 15 September 1885 Tresserve, France
- Died: 22 October 1918 (aged 33) Saint-Germain-en-Laye, France

Sport
- Sport: Cycling
Medal record
Representing France
UCI Motor-paced World Championships
Bronze medal – third place	1907 Paris	Professionals
Gold medal – first place	1909 Copenhagen	Professionals
Gold medal – first place	1910 Brussels	Professionals
Gold medal – first place	1911 Rome	Professionals

Georges Parent (15 September 1885 – 22 October 1918) was a French professional cyclist who was active between 1907 and 1914, predominantly in motor-paced racing. In this discipline he won the world championships in 1909–1911 and finished in third place in 1907.

Parent started biking while working as a delivery boy for a coffee shop. His first competition was a road race in 1903. He retired from cycling with the start of World War I, enlisted to the French Army and was wounded several times in battles. Three weeks before the end of the war, he died of the Spanish flu.
