= Leo Proost =

Belgian cyclist

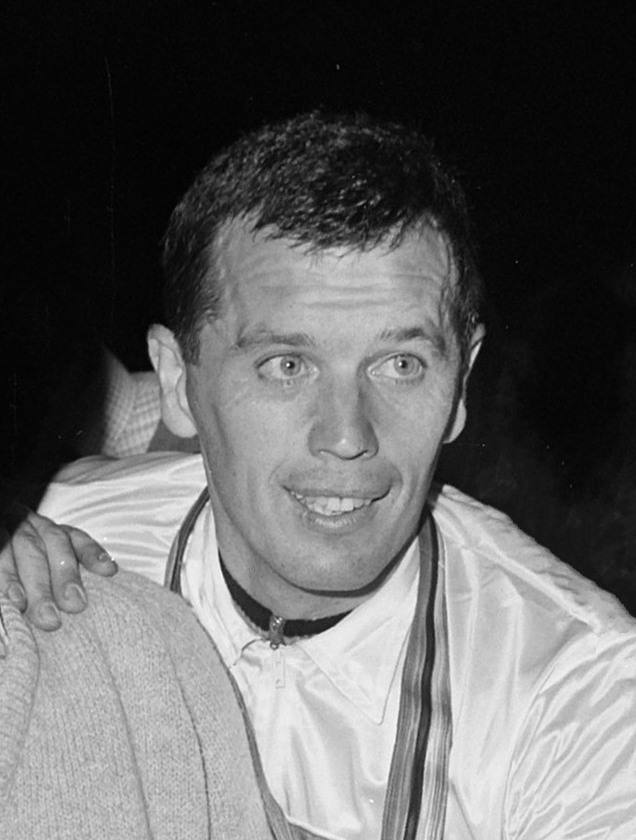
- Leo Proost in Amsterdam in 1967

Personal information
- Born: 1 November 1933 Oud-Turnhout, Belgium
- Died: 24 May 2016 (aged 82)

Sport
- Sport: Motor-paced racing
Medal record
Representing Belgium
Motor-paced World Championships
Gold medal – first place	1963 Liege	Professionals
Silver medal – second place	1964 Paris	Professionals
Bronze medal – third place	1966 Frankfurt	Professionals
Gold medal – first place	1967 Amsterdam	Professionals
Gold medal – first place	1968 Rome	Professionals

Leo Proost (1 November 1933 – 24 May 2016) was a Belgian cyclist. His best achievements were in motor-paced racing, in which he won the world championships in the professionals category in 1963, 1967 and 1968, as well as national titles between 1963 and 1968. During his career Proost took part in 25 six-day races, winning the race of Antwerp in 1963.
