= Arie van Houwelingen =

Dutch cyclist (born 1931)

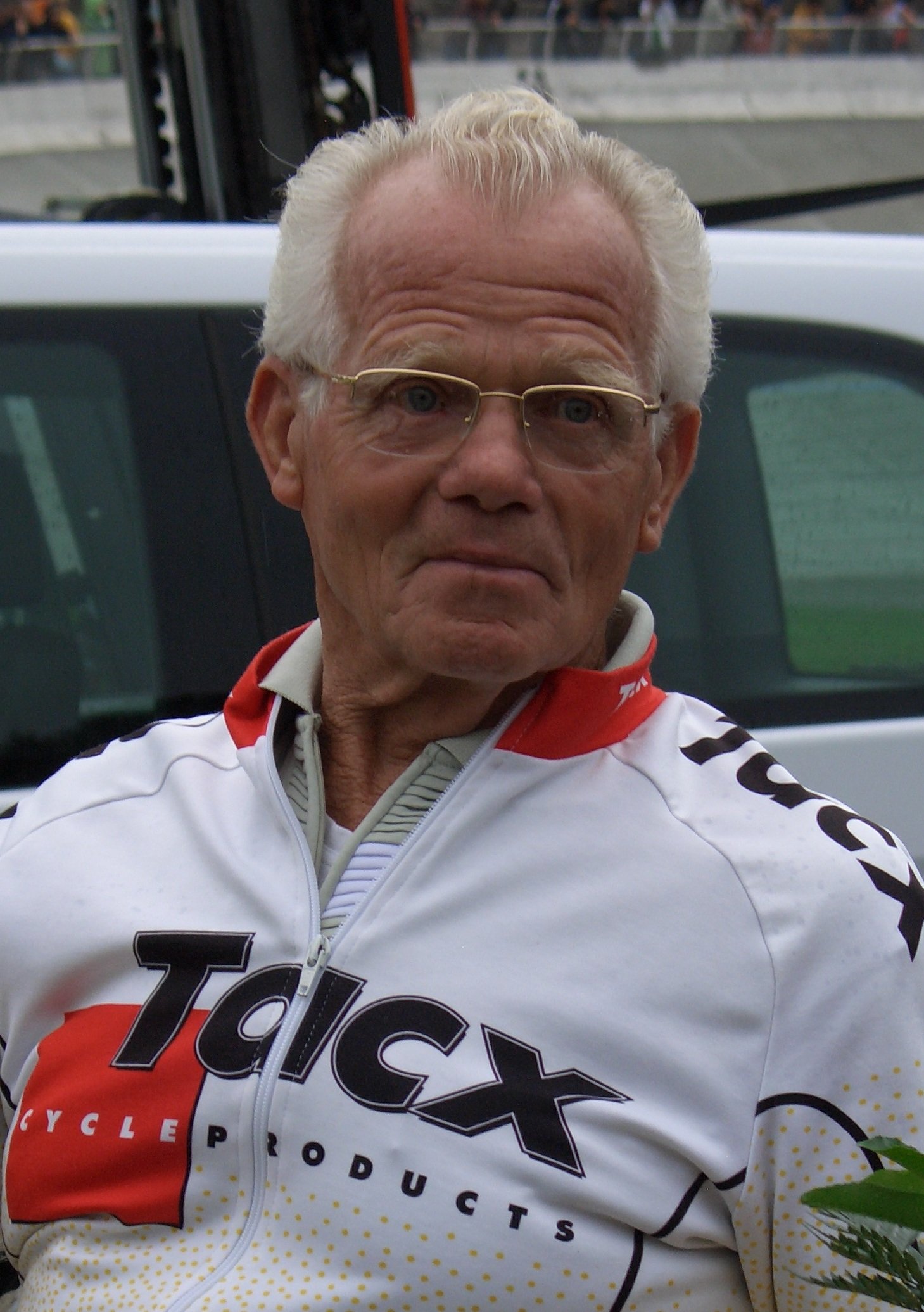
- Arie van Houwelingen in 2010

Personal information
- Born: 28 November 1931 (age 94) Boskoop, the Netherlands

Sport
- Sport: Motor-paced racing
Medal record
Representing the Netherlands
Motor-paced World Championships
Bronze medal – third place	1958 Paris	Amateurs
Gold medal – first place	1959 Amsterdam	Amateurs

Arie van Houwelingen (born 28 November 1931) is a retired cyclist from the Netherlands. In 1959 he won the UCI Motor-paced World Championships in the amateurs category and was named the Dutch Sportsman of the year. He then turned professional and finished in second place at the national championships in 1960 and 1961.
