= David Solari (cyclist) =

Australian-Italian racing cyclist

Personal information
- Born: 6 June 1968 (age 58) Adelaide, Australia

Cycling career
- Sport: Cycling

David Solari (born 6 June 1968) is a former cyclist who, in 1985, became the first cyclist in history to be crowned national champion in two different countries. He was Australian Junior pursuit champion and Italian Champion. Solari had dual citizenship and represented Italy at the 1988 Summer Olympics and nine World track Championships. He collected two bronze medals in 1986, a bronze in 1989 and silver in 1990, 91 and 92. Solari also won eight Italian National track championships as well as representing Italy on 158 occasions. Solari was Australian Champion in 1985 and 1992.

Solari was also a successful road cyclist with 78 International road victories.

- 1986 3rd Individual Pursuit- Junior world championships,
- 1986 3rd Team pursuit- Junior world championships,
- 1989 3rd Team pursuit- World championships,
- 1990,91,92 2nd World Motor-pacing world championship.
- 1987 Giro del Salento 1st Overall, one stage win.
- 1992 Vicenza-Bionde
- 1990 1º Cinturón Ciclista Internacional a Mallorca, Spain
