= Walter Sawall =

German cyclist

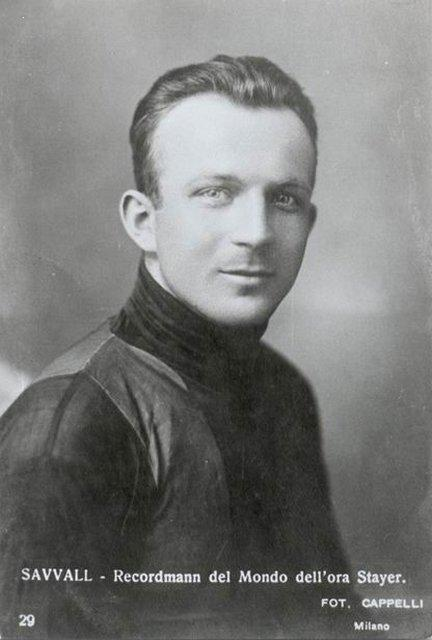

Personal information
- Born: 18 July 1899 Morgenroth, German Empire
- Died: 31 January 1953 (aged 53) Erkner, East Germany

Sport
- Sport: Cycling
Medal record
Representing Germany
UCI Motor-paced World Championships
Bronze medal – third place	1927 Cologne	Professionals
Gold medal – first place	1928 Budapest	Professionals
Gold medal – first place	1931 Copenhagen	Professionals
Silver medal – second place	1932 Rome	Professionals

Walter Sawall (18 July 1899 – 31 January 1953) was a German cyclist. Between 1927 and 1931 he won four medals at the UCI Motor-paced World Championships, including two gold medals in 1928 and 1931.

He left school at the age of 15 to help earn money for his family of eight siblings. While distributing newspapers and goods, he became involved in cycling. He had his first competition in 1916, with his greatest successes coming around 1930. For four years, he rode behind Ernest Pasquier, a French pacer, even though they could not speak each other’s language. Sawall retired in 1934 due to a bowel disease developed from cycling. He died in 1953 of a brain tumor. In 1932, a street in Erkner, where he lived, was named after him.
