= Martin Venix =

Dutch cyclist

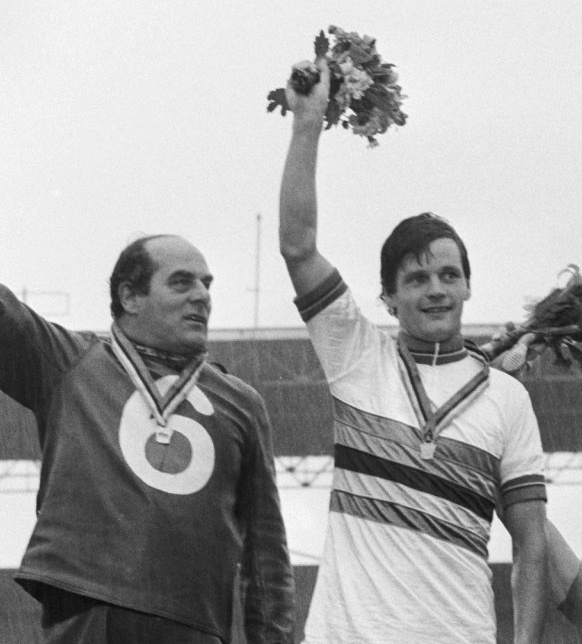
- Martin Venix (right) with his pacer Noppie Koch at the 1979 World Championships

Personal information
- Born: 4 March 1950 (age 76) Tilburg, the Netherlands

Sport
- Sport: Motor-paced racing
Medal record
Representing the Netherlands
World Championships
| Silver medal – second place | 1974 Montreal | Amateurs |
| Silver medal – second place | 1978 Munich | Professionals |
| Gold medal – first place | 1979 Amsterdam | Professionals |
| Gold medal – first place | 1982 Leicester | Professionals |

Martinus "Martin" Venix (born 4 March 1950) is a retired cyclist from the Netherlands. After winning a silver medal at the Amateur UCI Motor-paced World Championships in 1974 he turned professional, winning the UCI World Championships in 1979 and 1982 and finishing in second place in 1978.
