= Wilhelm Henie =

Norwegian sportsman and furrier (1872–1937)

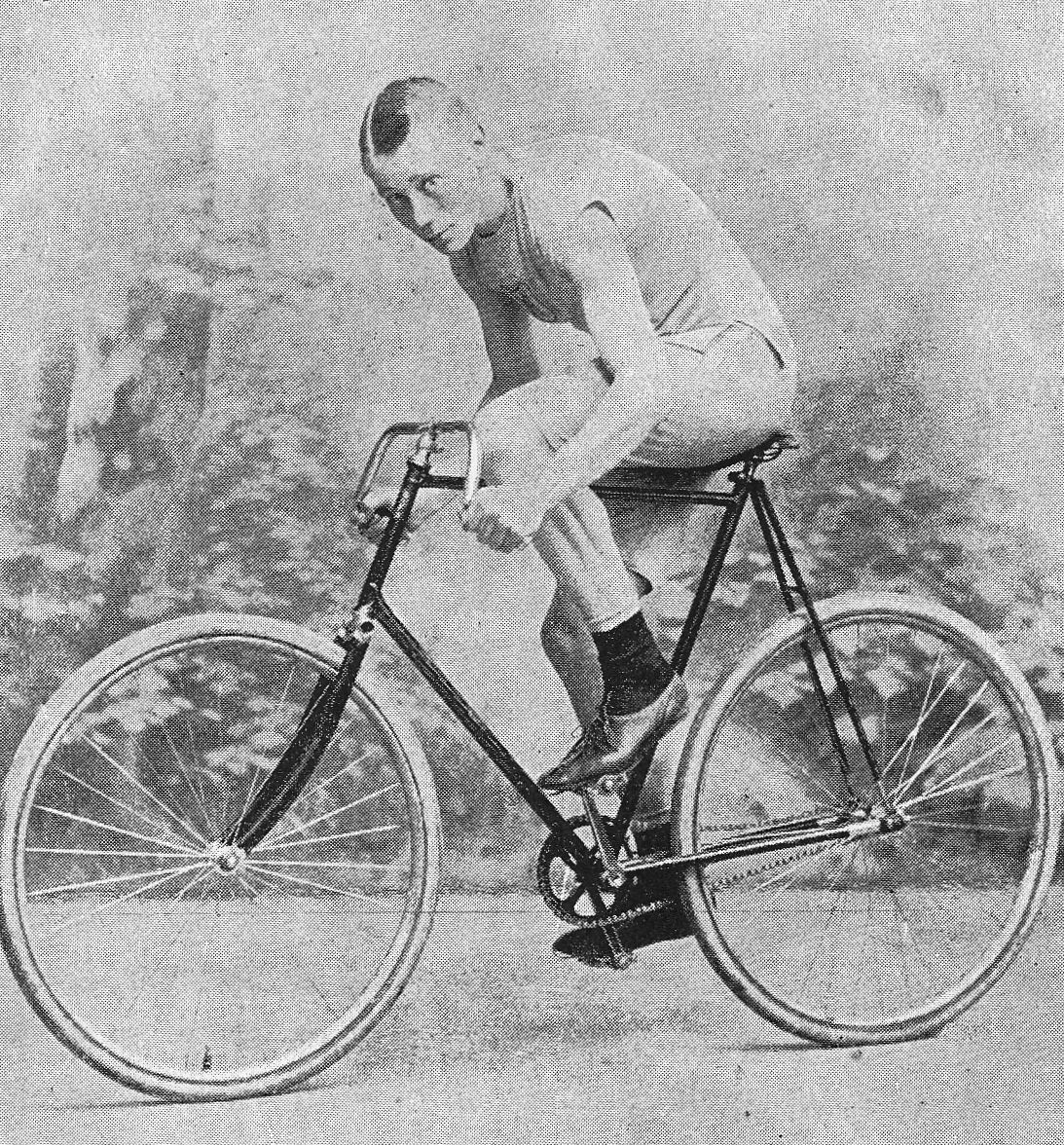
- Wilhem Henie on bike
- Born: 7 September 1872
- Died: 10 May 1937 (aged 64)
- Occupations: sportsman and furrier
- Known for: World champion in track cycling; Coach and manager for figure skater Sonja Henie
- Children: Sonja Henie, Leif Henie

Wilhelm Henie
Medal record

Men's track cycling

World Championships
Gold medal – first place	1894 Antwerp	100 km motor-pace
Bronze medal – third place	1895 Cologne	100 km motor-pace
Silver medal – second place	1900 Paris	100 km motor-pace

Wilhelm Henie (7 September 1872 – 10 May 1937) was a Norwegian sportsman and furrier. He was track cycling World Champion in 1894, and competed at the European Speed Skating Championships in 1896. Henie was coach and manager for his daughter Sonja, who became a famous international figure skating champion and later a major American film star.

== Cycling ==
Henie was an active track cyclist from 1889 to 1902. He represented the club Kristiania Velocipedklub. When he became World Champion in 1894, he was also the first Norwegian World Champion in any sport.

=== Early efforts ===
Henie started in his first race in June 1889, on the Majorstuen velodrome, and surprised by winning his class. In August 1889 he won the 2000 metre race on the Bygdø velodrome. In 1890 he represented his club at races in Copenhagen, and achieved a third place in 1 English mile.

=== Scandinavian success ===
In 1891 Henie experienced a lot of triumphs in Scandinavian races. He won races in Malmø and in Copenhagen, where he became Scandinavian Champion on 5000 metres. He also won 1st prizes at Majorstuen. He set Scandinavian records in halfmile, in one English mile, in 4000 metres, in 5000 metres and in 5 English miles. Henie was appointed consul for Svenskt Hjulsportförbund in 1892. The consular connections were important at the time, as Norway was not a member of the International Cycling Association, and enrollment to international races had to go through member countries.

=== International career ===
Henie participated in 100 km motor pace at the 1894 Track Cycling World Championships for amateurs in Antwerp, and became World Champion. He did not have a motor pace as his hardest competitors, but was helped by Dutch tandem cyclists at the end of the race. Henie won the championship 13 rounds ahead of Green from England. He set two World Records in 1894, in two English miles and in ten English miles, both at the Herne Hill Velodrome in London. In 1895 he finished 3rd at the World Championships in Cologne, behind Mathieu Cordang and Witteveen. In 1900 he finished second at the World Championships in Paris, behind Bastien, with Hildebrand finishing third. He continued active cycling until 1902.

== Speed skating ==
Henie was also a speed skater. He competed at the 1896 European Speed Skating Championships in Hamburg, where he finished second on 500m, third in 1500m, third in 5000m, and third in 10000m.

== Coach and manager for Sonja ==
Henie was married to Selma Lochmann-Nielsen (1888–1961). They had two children, Leif and Sonja. Sonja started taking ballet lessons from she was five years old, and got her own skates when she was six. The family lived close to Frogner Stadion in Kristiania, and Sonja found her way to the ice, where she liked to play and experiment with the skates. When Sonja was only six years old, she was discovered by Hjørdis Olsen, a figure skater and coach for the skating club.

When Henie learned that his daughter had extraordinary talent, he decided to give her the best possible training. He found professional coaches for her, and travelled to the best training sites in Europe. Among her early coaches were former Norwegian champion and professional coach Oscar Holthe, and Martin Stixrud (10 times national champion, and Olympic medalist in 1920). In addition to training sessions with professional coaches, Henie himself coached her daughter. In her book Mitt livs eventyr Sonja says she had "the world's best manager, promotor, coach, helper and father". Later he also and arranged for performances at sports meetings. Sonja performed during intermissions at the large skating competitions in Oslo in 1921, 1922 and 1923, which gave her experience in performing in front of a large public.

Henie managed to get Sonja enrolled at the first Winter Olympics in Chamonix in 1924, and followed her to preparations in St. Moritz prior to the games. Sonja was then only eleven years old. Henie and his wife Selma also designed Sonja's skating costumes. Sonja became World Champion in figure skating first time in 1927, and from then on every year until 1936. She became Olympic Champion in 1928, and again in 1932 and in 1936. She was European champion in 1931, 1932, 1933, 1934, 1935 and 1936, and several times national champion. During this period Henie devoted much of his time and energy on his daughter's career.

After three Olympic gold medals and ten World Championships, Sonja gave up her amateur status and headed for a film career in Hollywood. The family travelled to America in 1936, when Sonja was 25 years old. Henie hired the skating stadion "The Polar Palace" in Los Angeles for an ice show, arranged for promotion in newspapers, and invited important persons from Hollywood. Sonja signed a lucrative five years' contract with film maker Darryl F. Zanuck, and her first film, One In A Million was finished late 1936. Parallel to the film career, Sonja also performed in popular ice revues.

Henie died in 1937.
