= Fritz Vanderstuyft =

Belgian cyclist

Fritz Vanderstuyft (born 22 September 1854, Ypres -- died September 1922, Ostend) was a professional Belgian racing cyclist from 1893 to 1899. He took part in several championship events, notably the Paris-Roubaix in 1896. His sons Arthur and Léon were also professional bicycle racers.

== Victories ==
- 1896
  - Sixteenth Paris-Roubaix
- 1898
  - Eighteenth Paris-Roubaix
- 1899
  - Third Belgian Road Racing Championship
  - Thirteenth Paris-Roubaix
