= Bartolomé Caldentey =

Spanish cyclist

Personal information
- Born: 25 April 1951 (age 75) Sineu, Spain

Sport
- Sport: Cycling
Medal record
Representing Spain
UCI Motor-paced World Championships
Silver medal – second place	1976 Monteroni	Amateurs
Silver medal – second place	1977 San Cristobal	Amateurs

Bartolomé Caldentey (born 25 April 1951) is a retired Spanish cyclist. He won two silver medals at the UCI Motor-paced World Championships in 1976 and 1977. He finished in third place in 1980 but was disqualified for failing a doping test.
