= Piet de Wit =

Dutch cyclist (born 1946)

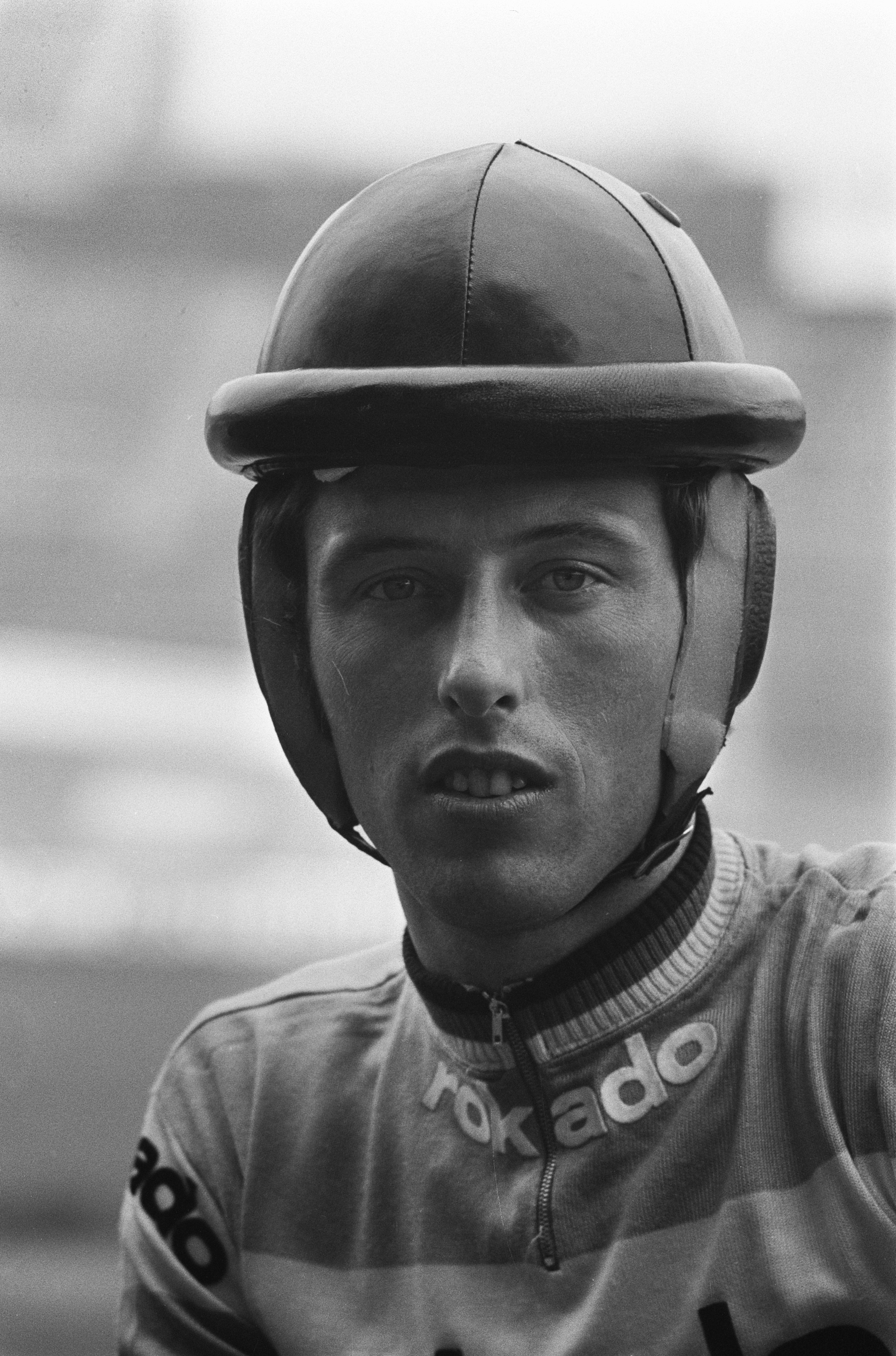
- Piet de Wit in 1973

Personal information
- National team: Netherlands
- Citizenship: Dutch,
- Born: 6 March 1946 (age 80) Wormer, the Netherlands

Sport
- Sport: Motor-paced racing
Medal record
Representing the Netherlands
World Championships
Gold medal – first place	1966 Frankfurt	Amateurs
Gold medal – first place	1967 Amsterdam	Amateurs
Silver medal – second place	1968 Rome	Professionals
Bronze medal – third place	1970	Professionals
Silver medal – second place	1973	Professionals
European Championships
Bronze medal – third place	1972	Professionals
Silver medal – second place	1973	Professionals

Piet de Wit (born 6 March 1946) is a retired cyclist from the Netherlands who won the Amateur UCI Motor-paced World Championships in 1966 and 1967.His sporting career began with DTS Zaandam. He then moved into the professionals category and won another three medals in 1968, 1970 and 1973.

He was raised with three sisters in a biking family – his parents worked for a bicycle company. After retiring from active competitions in 1974, he established a family-run bicycle shop in his native Wormer, which later expanded into a chain in North Holland. In 1994 he passed the shop management to his business partner Martin Slagt.

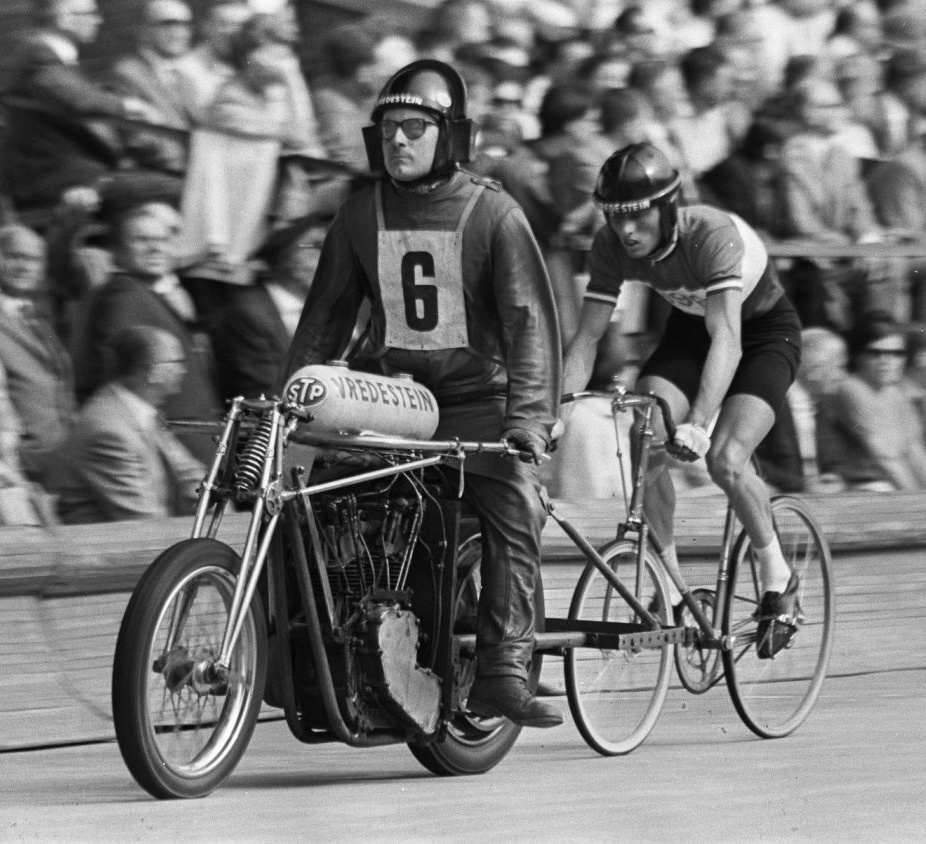
Piet de Wit at the World Championships 1967

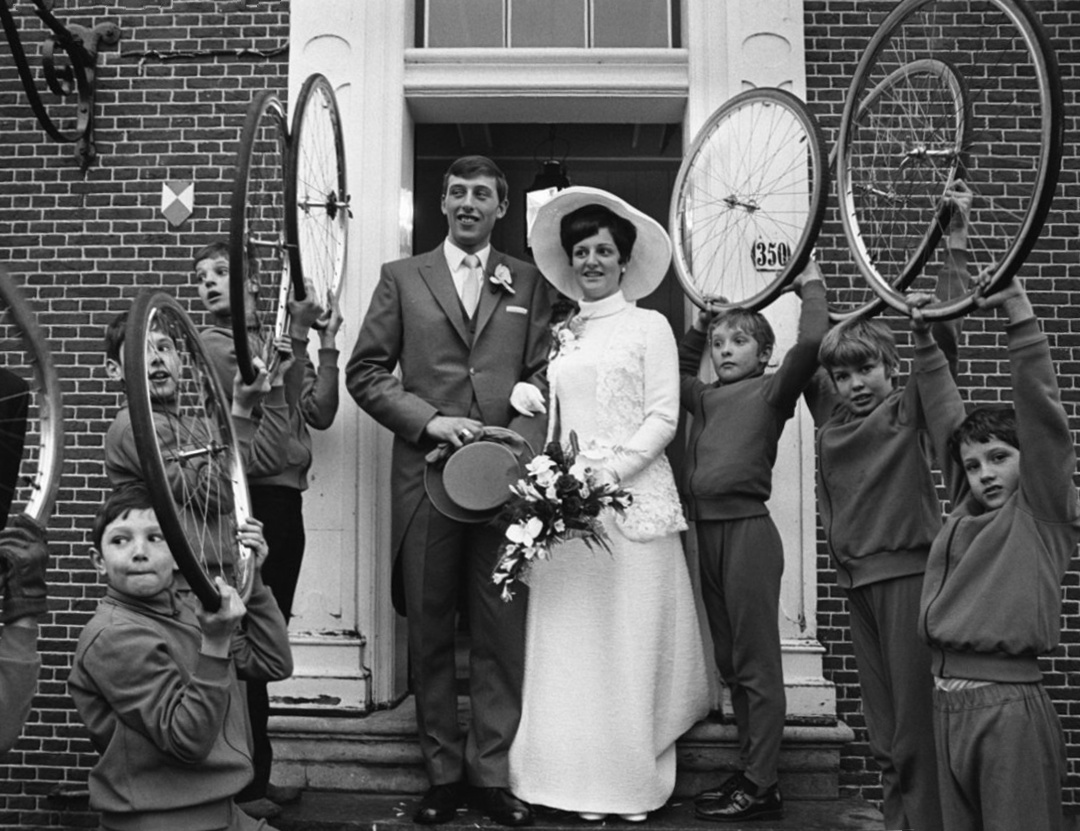
Marriage on 24 December 1969
