= Léon Vanderstuyft =

Belgian cyclist

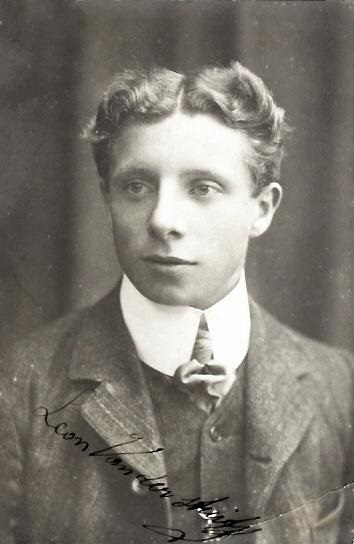

Personal information
- Born: 5 May 1890 Ypres, Belgium
- Died: 26 February 1964 (aged 73) Paris, France

Sport
- Sport: Cycling
Medal record
Representing Belgium
Motor-paced World Championships
Bronze medal – third place	1908 Leipzig	Amateurs
Silver medal – second place	1910 Brussels	Professionals
Gold medal – first place	1922 Paris	Professionals

Léon Vanderstuyft (5 May 1890 – 26 February 1964) was a Belgian cyclist. After winning a bronze medal at the UCI Motor-paced World Championships in 1908 in the amateurs division he turned professional and won a silver and a gold medal in 1910 and 1922, respectively.

On 29 September 1928 he set a world speed record of 122.771 km/h riding behind a pacer.

His father Fritz and elder brother Arthur were also professional cyclists.
