= Dries Helsloot =

Dutch cyclist (born 1937)

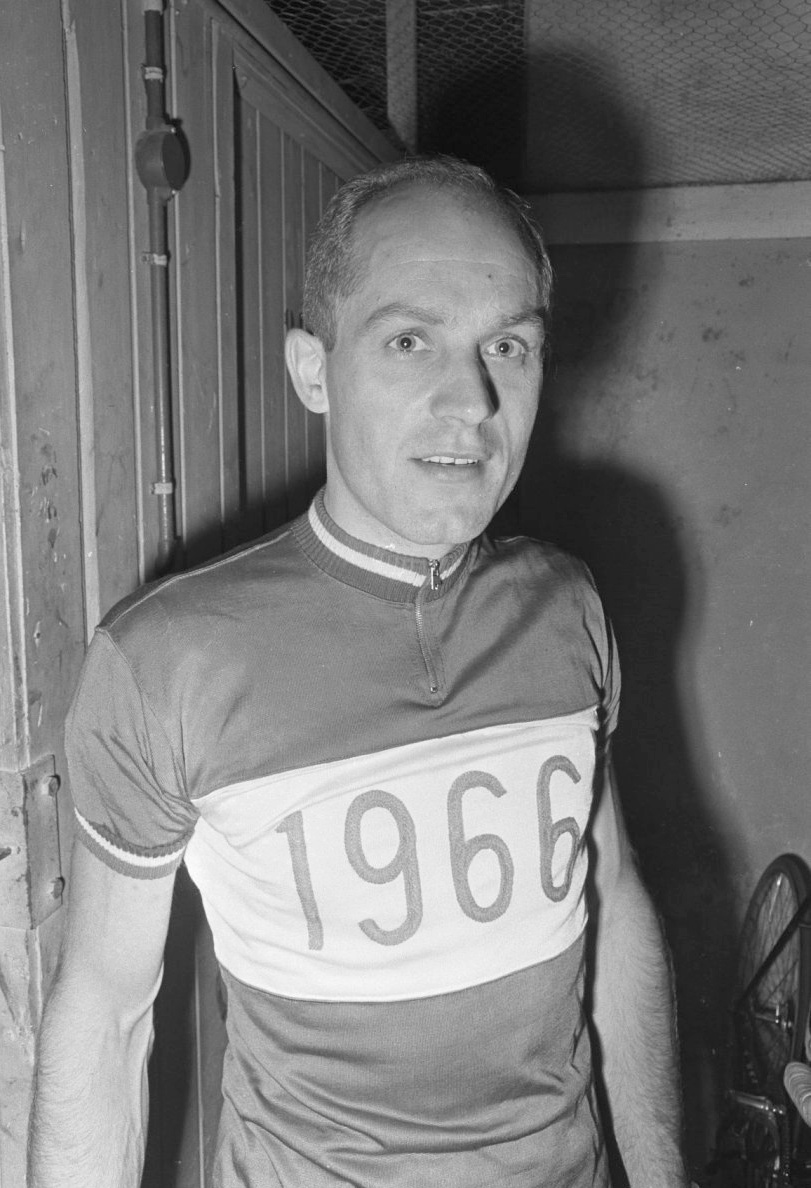

Personal information
- Born: 4 January 1937 (age 89) Amsterdam, the Netherlands

Sport
- Sport: Cycling
Medal record
Representing the Netherlands
UCI Motor-paced World Championships
Bronze medal – third place	1967 Amsterdam	Amateurs

Dries Helsloot (born 4 January 1937) is a retired cyclist from the Netherlands. In 1967 he won a bronze medal at the UCI Motor-paced World Championships in his native Amsterdam. He won a national title in motor-paced racing in 1966 and finished in second place in 1967–1969.
