= Rönök =

Rönök Radling
- Location of Rönök in Hungary
- Coordinates: 46°58′36″N 16°22′04″E
- Country: Hungary
- Region: Western Transdanubia
- County: Vas
- Subregion: Szentgotthárdi
- Rank: Village

Area
  - Total: 17.22 km^{2} (6.65 sq mi)

Population (1 January 2008)
  - Total: 456
  - Density: 26.5/km^{2} (68.6/sq mi)
- Time zone: UTC+1 (CET)
  - Summer (DST): UTC+2 (CEST)
- Postal code: 9954
- Area code: +36 94
- KSH code: 26806
- Website: www.ronok.hu

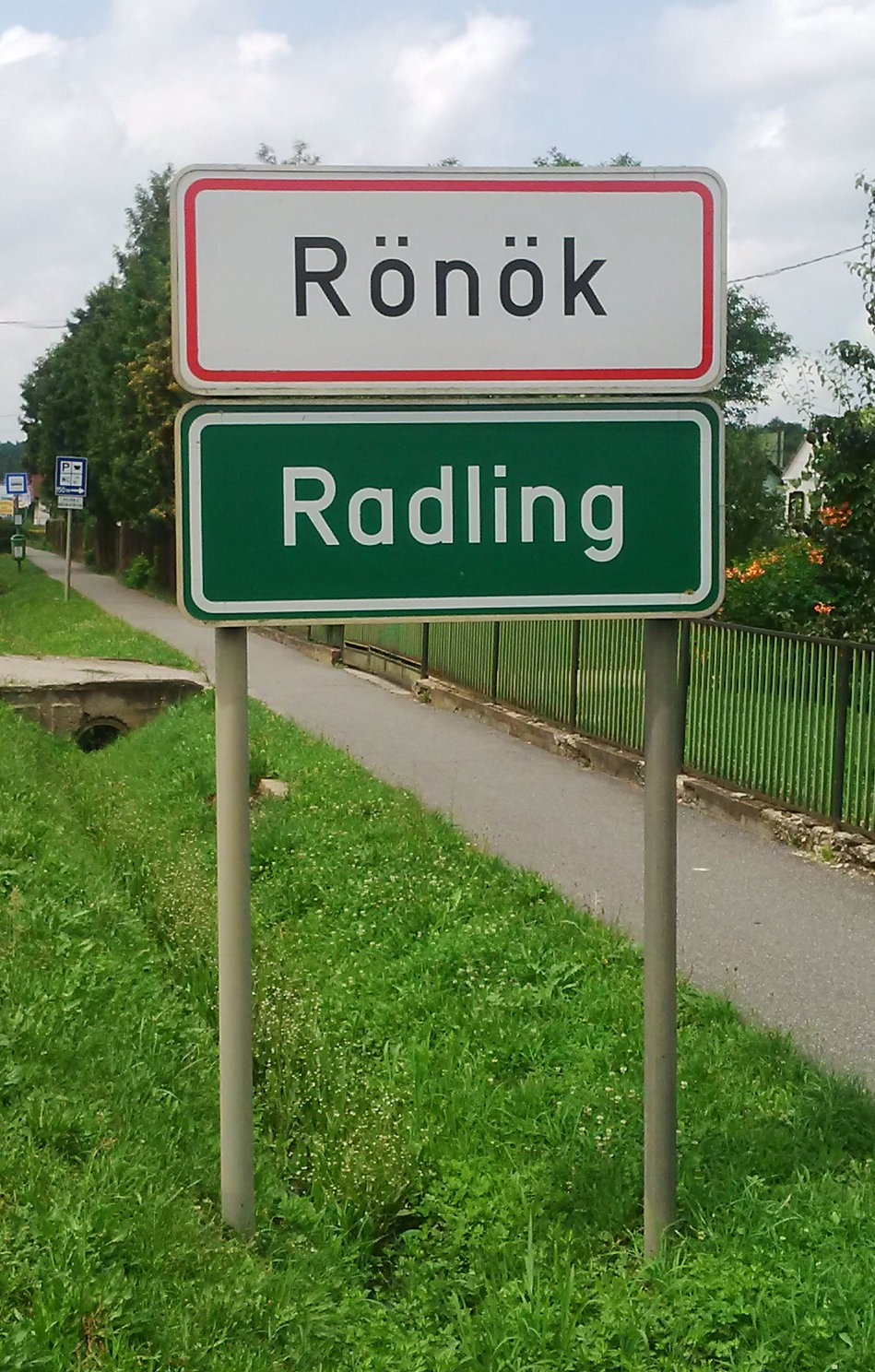
Bilingual sign

Rönök (German: Radling; Slovene: Renik) is a village in Vas County, Hungary.
