= Stan Tourné =

Belgian cyclist

Personal information
- Born: 30 December 1955 (age 70) Willebroek, Belgium

Sport
- Sport: Cycling
Medal record
Representing Belgium
World Championships
| Gold medal – first place | 1977 San Cristóbal | Points race, amateurs |
| Gold medal – first place | 1980 Besançon | Points race, professionals |
| Silver medal – second place | 1986 Colorado Springs | Motor pace, professionals |
| Bronze medal – third place | 1984 Barcelona | Motor pace, professionals |

Constant "Stan" Tourné (30 December 1955) is a retired Belgian cyclist. After winning the world title in points race in 1977 as amateur he turned professional and won the same title again in 1980. He also won two medals at the UCI Motor-paced World Championships in 1984 and 1986. In 1988, he finished in second place but was disqualified for failing the drug test.

As a track cyclist he took part in 176 six-day races. He won seven of them, in Antwerp (1983, 1988 and 1992), Paris (1985), Ghent (1985, 1989) and Cologne (1988), and 21 times finished in second place.

He is married to Ingrid Leleu (b. 1957). They have two daughters.
