= Arthur Vanderstuyft =

Belgian cyclist

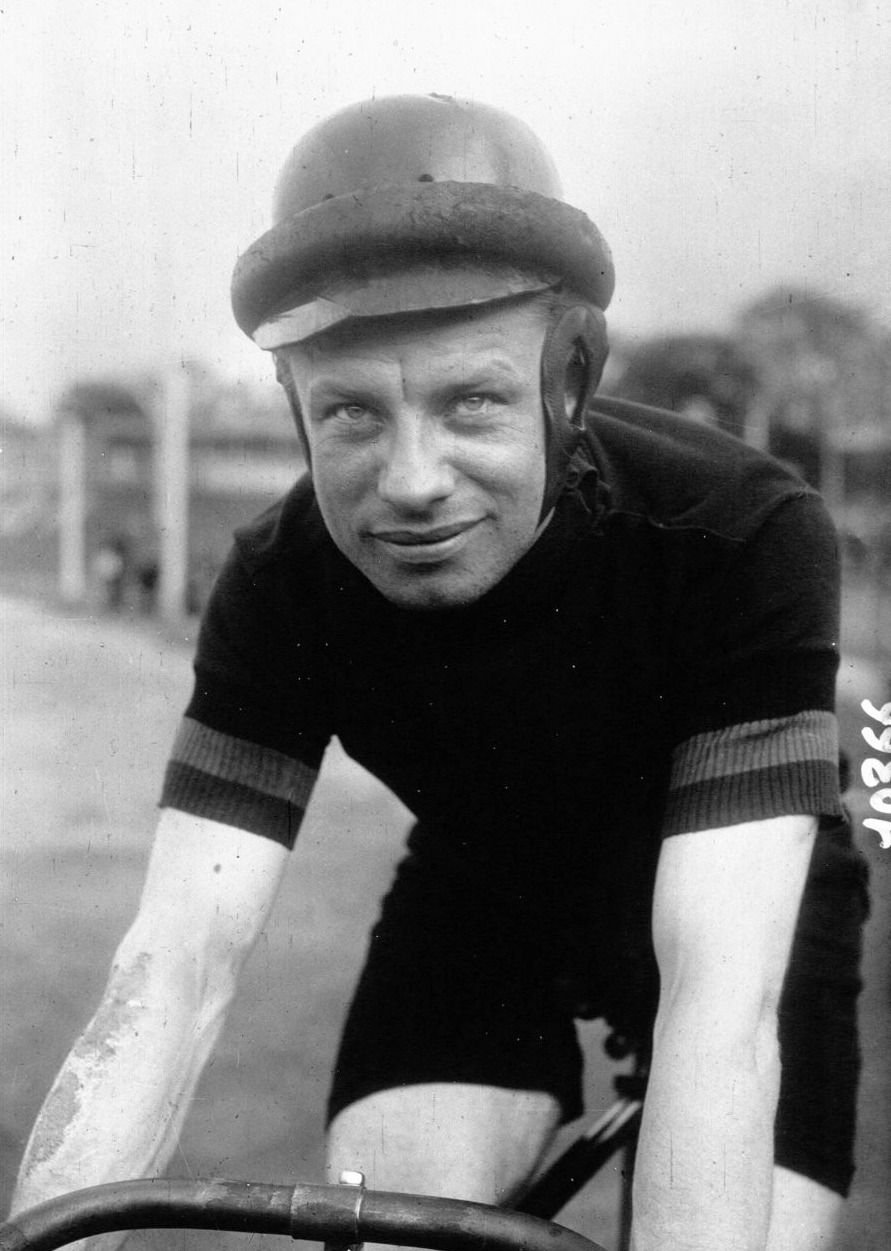
- Arthur Vanderstuyft in 1913

Personal information
- Born: 23 December 1883 Essen, Belgium
- Died: 6 May 1956 (aged 72) Borgerhout, Belgium

Sport
- Sport: Cycling
Medal record
Representing Belgium
Motor-paced World Championships
Bronze medal – third place	1904 London	Professionals
Silver medal – second place	1906 Geneva	Professionals
Bronze medal – third place	1908 Leipzig	Professionals

Arthur Vanderstuyft (23 December 1883 – 6 May 1956) was a Belgian cyclist. He competed in motor-paced racing in the professionals category and won three medals at the world championships in 1904, 1906 and 1908.

As a road cyclist he competed in ten six-day races and twice finished in second place: in 1904 in New York and in 1912 in Brussels. His father Fritz and younger brother Léon were also professional cyclists.
