= UEC European Track Championships – Stayer =

Elite level championships

European Champion Jersey

The European Champion Jersey, from 2016

The stayer race is one of the 2 motor-paced racing disciplines of the annual UEC European Track Championships.

In the past, private organizers of track cycling events organized championships (European Criterion or Winter championship) during the Winter months. The first European championship Stayer was held in 1896.

The sub federation for professional cycling of the UCI, the FICP organized official European championships (called Championnats d'Hiver) between 1972 and 1990.

Since 1995 the European Cycling Union is responsible for this event.

== Men's Medalists ==
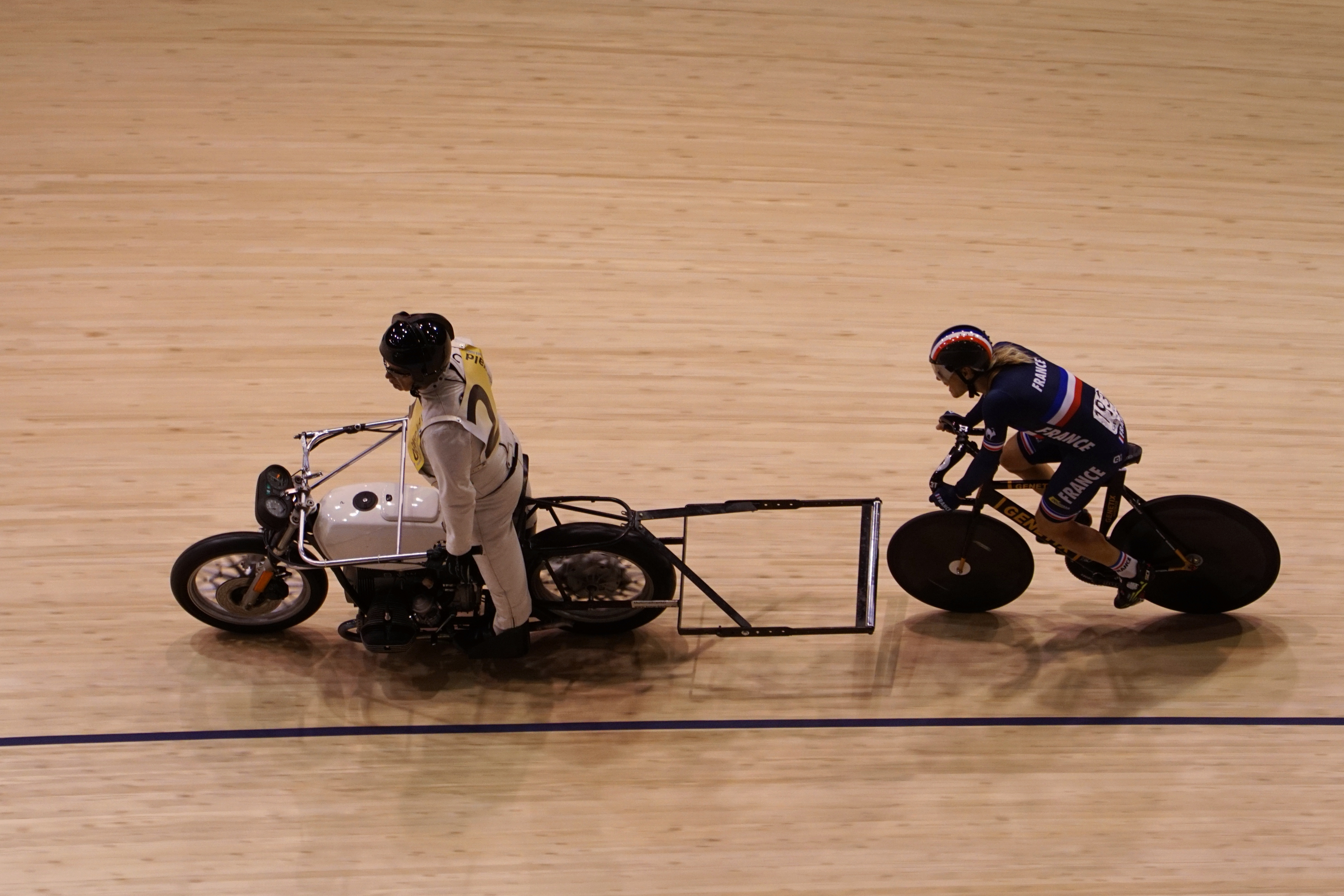
2017 UEC Track Elite European Championships Stayer final

Championship	Gold	Silver	Bronze
Winter Championship
1896 Berlin	(France) Lucien Lesna	Paul Münchner	(France) Alphonse Baugé
1897 Berlin	Franz Gerger	(Belgium) Henri Luyten	Alfred Köcher
1898 Mainz	(France) Lucien Lesna	Wilhelm Struck	Paul Becker
1899 Berlin	(United Kingdom) Artur Adalbert Chase	(United Kingdom) Albert E. Walters	(France) Émile Bouhours
1900 Breslau	(Netherlands) Piet Dickentman	(France) Constant Huret	(France) Eduard Taylor
1901 Leipzig	Thaddäus Robl	(Netherlands) Piet Dickentman	(Switzerland) Fritz Ryser
1902 Leipzig	Thaddäus Robl	(France) Henri Contenet	(United Kingdom) Jimmy Michael
1903 Leipzig	Thaddäus Robl	(France) Paul Dangla	(Netherlands) Piet Dickentman
1904 Leipzig	Thaddäus Robl	(United Kingdom) Tommy Hall	(Netherlands) Piet Dickentman
1905 Leipzig	(France) Paul Guignard	Thaddäus Robl	(France) Louis Darragon
1906 Dresden	(France) Paul Guignard	(United States) Robert Walthour	Thaddäus Robl
1907 Hannover	Thaddäus Robl	(Netherlands) Piet Dickentman	(Belgium) Arthur Vanderstuyft
1908 Cologne	Arthur Stellbrink	(France) Paul Guignard	Peter Günther
1909 Berlin	(France) Paul Guignard	Albert Schipke	Thaddäus Robl
1910 Dresden	Friedrich Theile	(United States) Robert Walthour	(Switzerland) Fritz Ryser
1911 Roubaix	(United States) Jimmy Moran	(France) Paul Guignard	Willi Mauß
1912 Barmen	(France) Paul Guignard	Peter Günther	Karl Saldow
1913 Antwerp	(Belgium) Victor Linart	(France) Paul Guignard	Gustav Janke
1914-1919	Not held		
1920 Tours	(France) Georges Sérès	(France) Jules Miquel	(Belgium) Karel Verkeyn
1921-1925	Not held		
European Criterion
1926 Brussels	(Belgium) Émile Aerts	(France) Georges Paillard	(Netherlands) Jan Snoek
1927-1930	Not held		
1931 Nice	(Belgium) Jean Aerts	(France) André Leducq	(France) Paul Broccardo
1932 Nice	(France) Antonin Magne	(Belgium) Romain Gijssels	(Switzerland) Albert Büchi
1933 Nice	(Italy) Learco Guerra	(France) Adrien Buttafochi	(France) Paul Broccardo
1934-1948	Not held		
1948	(Switzerland) Jacques Besson	(Italy) Elia Frosio	(Belgium) August Meuleman
1949 Zürich	(Switzerland) Jacques Besson	(Italy) Elia Frosio	(Belgium) August Meuleman
1950 Antwerp	(France) Raoul Lesueur	(Italy) Elia Frosio	(Netherlands) Cor Bakker
1951	Not held		
1952 Dortmund	(Belgium) Adolf Verschueren	(France) Raoul Lesueur	(Germany) Erich Bautz
1953 Paris	(France) Roger Queugnet	(Belgium) Adolf Verschueren	(France) Roger Godeau
1954 Dortmund	(Belgium) Adolf Verschueren	(West Germany) Horst Holzmann	(France) Guy Bethery
1955 Dortmund	(West Germany) Lothar Schiller	(Belgium) Adolf Verschueren	(Switzerland) Jacques Besson
1956 Dortmund	(West Germany) Karl-Heinz Marsell	(Belgium) Adolf Verschueren	(Australia) Graham French
1957 Paris	(Belgium) Adolf Verschueren	(France) Roger Godeau	(Australia) Graham French
1958 Zürich	(West Germany) Karl-Heinz Marsell	(Belgium) Paul Depaepe	(Switzerland) Walter Bucher
1959 Dortmund	(Belgium) Adolf Verschueren	(Spain) Guillermo Timoner	(West Germany) Valentin Petry
1960 Berlin	(West Germany) Karl-Heinz Marsell	(Spain) Guillermo Timoner	(Netherlands) Norbert Koch
1961 Dortmund	(Belgium) Adolf Verschueren	(Netherlands) Wout Wagtmans	(West Germany) Otto Altweck
1962 Brussels	(Belgium) Paul Depaepe	(France) Jean Raynal	(West Germany) Karl-Heinz Marsell
1963 Dortmund	(Belgium) Paul Depaepe	(West Germany) Karl-Heinz Marsell	(Spain) Guillermo Timoner
1964 Dortmund	(Belgium) Paul Depaepe	(Spain) Guillermo Timoner	(Belgium) Leo Proost
1965 Zürich	(Belgium) Leo Proost	(Netherlands) Jaap Oudkerk	(Italy) Domenico De Lillo
1966 WBerlin	(Belgium) Leo Proost	(West Germany) Ehrenfried Rudolph	(Spain) Guillermo Timoner
1967 Dortmund	(West Germany) Dieter Kemper	(Belgium) Romain De Loof	(West Germany) Ehrenfried Rudolph
1968 Berlin	(Netherlands) Jaap Oudkerk	(West Germany) Ehrenfried Rudolph	(Belgium) Romain De Loof
1969 Dortmund	(West Germany) Dieter Kemper	(Netherlands) Jaap Oudkerk	(West Germany) Ehrenfried Rudolph
1970 Berlin	(West Germany) Hans Junkermann	(Netherlands) Jaap Oudkerk	(West Germany) Ehrenfried Rudolph
1971 Dortmund	(West Germany) Ehrenfried Rudolph	(West Germany) Dieter Kemper	(Netherlands) Jaap Oudkerk
European Championship
1972 Dortmund	(West Germany) Dieter Kemper	(Belgium) Theo Verschueren	(Netherlands) Jaap Oudkerk
1973 Dortmund	(West Germany) Dieter Kemper	(Belgium) Theo Verschueren	(Netherlands) Piet De Wit
1974 Dortmund	(Netherlands) Cees Stam	(Netherlands) Piet De Wit	(Belgium) Romain De Loof
1975 Berlin	(West Germany) Dieter Kemper	(Netherlands) Cees Stam	(West Germany) Wilfried Peffgen
1976 Dortmund	(Netherlands) Cees Stam	(West Germany) Dieter Kemper	(Netherlands) René Pijnen
1977 Dortmund	(West Germany) Wilfried Peffgen	(Switzerland) René Savary	(Italy) Walter Avogadri
1978 Dortmund	(West Germany) Wilfried Peffgen	(Switzerland) René Savary	(Belgium) Willy De Bosscher
1979 Dortmund	(West Germany) Wilfried Peffgen	(West Germany) Horst Schütz	(Netherlands) Martin Venix
1980 Dortmund	(West Germany) Wilfried Peffgen	(West Germany) Horst Schütz	(Netherlands) Martin Venix
1981 Dortmund	(West Germany) Wilfried Peffgen	(West Germany) Horst Schütz	(Netherlands) Martin Venix
1982 Dortmund	(West Germany) Horst Schütz	(Netherlands) René Kos	(West Germany) Wilfried Peffgen
1983 Zürich	(West Germany) Horst Schütz	(Switzerland) Max Hürzeler	(West Germany) Wilfried Peffgen
1984 Dortmund	(Switzerland) Max Hürzeler	(Netherlands) Martin Venix	(Italy) Bruno Vicino
1985 Stuttgart	(West Germany) Werner Betz	(Belgium) Constant Tourné	(West Germany) Horst Schütz
1986 Zürich	(West Germany) Werner Betz	(Switzerland) Max Hürzeler	(Italy) Bruno Vicino
1987 Zürich	(Switzerland) Max Hürzeler	(Netherlands) Mathieu Hermans	(Switzerland) Peter Steiger
1988 Copenhagen	(Switzerland) Max Hürzeler	(Switzerland) Peter Steiger	(Belgium) Constant Tourné
1989 Dortmund	(Australia) Danny Clark	(Belgium) Constant Tourné	(West Germany) Torsten Rellensmann
1990 Dortmund	(West Germany) Torsten Rellensmann	(West Germany) Roland Günther	(Switzerland) Peter Steiger
1991 Dortmund	(Germany) Torsten Rellensmann	(Switzerland) Andrea Bellati	(Germany) Roland Günther
1992-1994	Not held		
UEC European Championship
1995 Zürich	(Switzerland) Arno Küttel	(Germany) Carsten Podlesch	(Austria) Roland Königshofer
1996 Forst	(Germany) Carsten Podlesch	(Switzerland) Richi Rossi	(Austria) Roland Königshofer
1997 Berlin	(Italy) Sabino Cannone	(Switzerland) Hans-Kurt Brand	(Germany) Carsten Podlesch
1998 Forst	(Switzerland) Hans-Kurt Brand	(Netherlands) Ronald Rol	(Netherlands) Patrick Kops
2000 Chemnitz	(Germany) Carsten Podlesch	(Germany) Stefan Klare	(Italy) Sabino Cannone
2001 Leipzig	(Germany) Carsten Podlesch	(Italy) Sabino Cannone	(Germany) Stefan Klare
2006 Forst	(Switzerland) Giuseppe Atzeni	(Germany) Carsten Podlesch	(Germany) Timo Scholz
2007 Alkmaar	(Germany) Timo Scholz	(Germany) Mario Vonhof	(Switzerland) Peter Jörg
2008 Alkmaar	(Germany) Timo Scholz	(Netherlands) Reinier Honig	(Switzerland) Peter Jörg
2009 Forst	(Switzerland) Giuseppe Atzeni	(Germany) Mario Vonhof	(Switzerland) Peter Jörg
2010 Alkmaar	(Switzerland) Giuseppe Atzeni	(Netherlands) Patrick Kos	(Netherlands) Bob Stöpler
2011 Nürnberg	(Netherlands) Patrick Kos	(Switzerland) Giuseppe Atzeni	(Switzerland) Mario Birrer
2012 Zürich	Canceled (weather related)		
2013 Nürnberg	(Switzerland) Mario Birrer	(Germany) Florian Fernow	(Switzerland) Giuseppe Atzeni
2014 Forst	(Switzerland) Mario Birrer	(Germany) Stefan Schäfer	(Netherlands) Patrick Kos
2015	Not held		
2016 Saint Quentin-en-Yvelines	(Germany) Stefan Schäfer	(Germany) Franz Schiewer	(Switzerland) Giuseppe Atzeni
2017 Berlin	(Germany) Franz Schiewer	(Netherlands) Reinier Honig	(Germany) Stefan Schäfer
2018 Erfurt	(Germany) Franz Schiewer	(Netherlands) Reinier Honig	(Germany) Daniel Harnisch
2019 Pordenone	(Netherlands) Reinier Honig	(Germany) Christoph Schweizer	(Germany) Daniel Harnisch
2020-2021	Not held due to COVID-19 pandemic		
2022 Lyon	(France) Kévin Fouache	(Switzerland) Giuseppe Atzeni	(Germany) Daniel Harnisch
2023 Pordenone	(Netherlands) Reinier Honig	(Germany) Daniel Harnisch	(Germany) Robert Retschke
