= 2017 UEC European Track Championships – Men's stayer =

Men's stayer at the 2017 UEC European Track Championships
- UEC European Champion jersey
- Venue: Velodrom, Berlin
- Date: 21 October
- Competitors: 14 from 4 nations
- Winning time: 46:17

Medalists
gold medal	Franz Schiewer piloted by Gerhard Geßler	Germany
silver medal	Reinier Honig piloted by Jos Pronk	Netherlands
bronze medal	Stefan Schäfer piloted by Peter Bauerlein	Germany

The Men's stayer was held on 21 October 2017. 7 riders were motor-paced by their pilots over a distance of 50 km (200 laps)

== Results ==
Rank	Name	Nation	Result
1st place, gold medalist(s)	Franz Schiewer piloted by Gerhard Geßler	Germany	46:17
2nd place, silver medalist(s)	Reinier Honig piloted by Jos Pronk	Netherlands	46:19
3rd place, bronze medalist(s)	Stefan Schäfer piloted by Peter Bauerlein	Germany	46:30
4	Davide Viganò piloted by Christian Dagnoni	Italy	-1 lap
5	Patrick Kos piloted by Jan-Willem Fack	Netherlands	-2 laps
6	Emilien Clere piloted by François Toscano	France	-3 laps
7	Thomas Steger piloted by Thomas Ruder	Germany	-5 laps
