= Alfred Görnemann =

German cyclist (1877–1903)

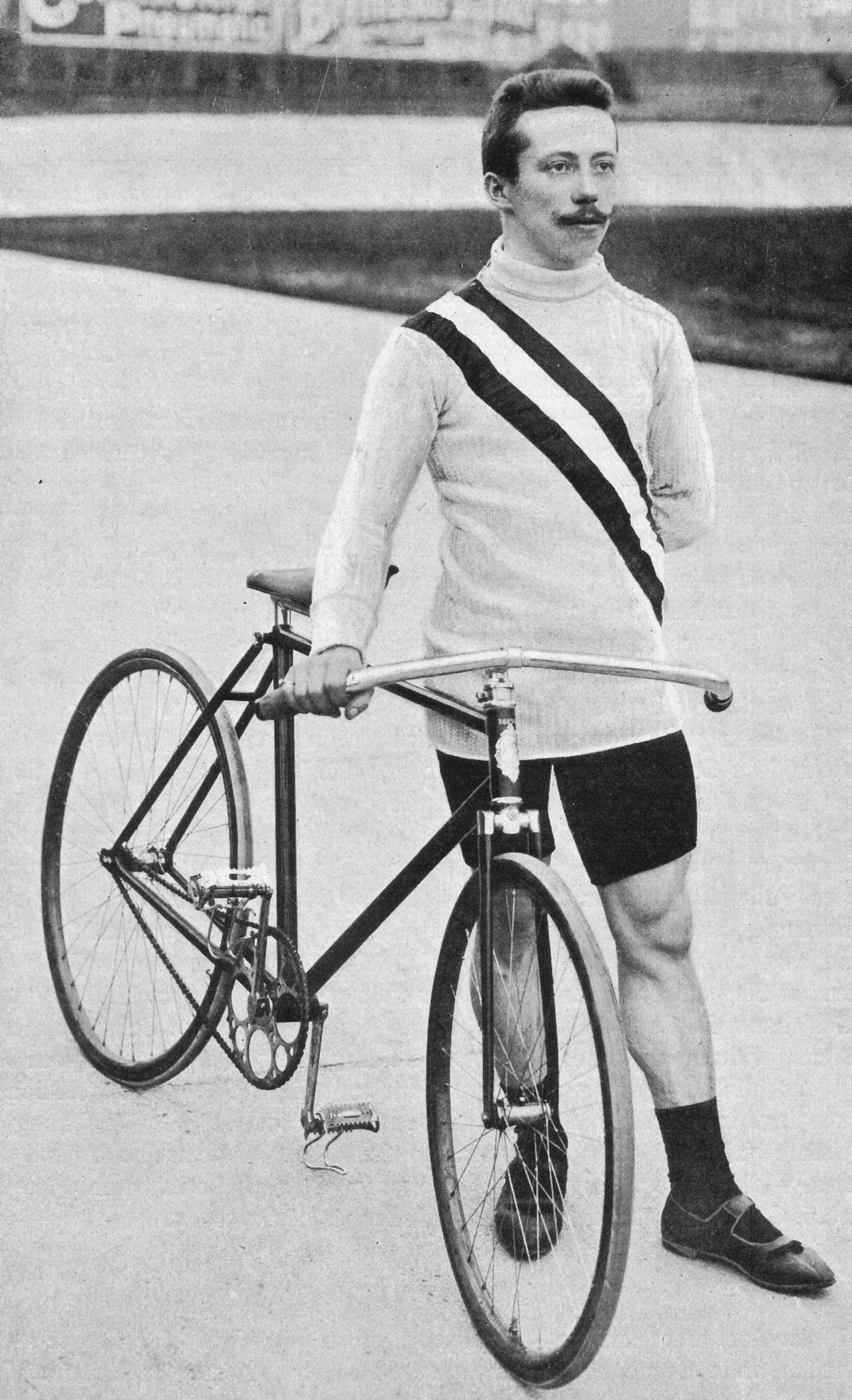

Personal information
- Born: 1 September 1877 Berlin, Germany
- Died: 11 October 1903 (aged 26) Dresden, Germany

Sport
- Sport: Cycling
Medal record
Representing Germany
UCI Motor-paced World Championships
Bronze medal – third place	1901 Berlin	Amateurs
Gold medal – first place	1902 Rome	Amateurs
Bronze medal – third place	1903 Copenhagen	Professionals

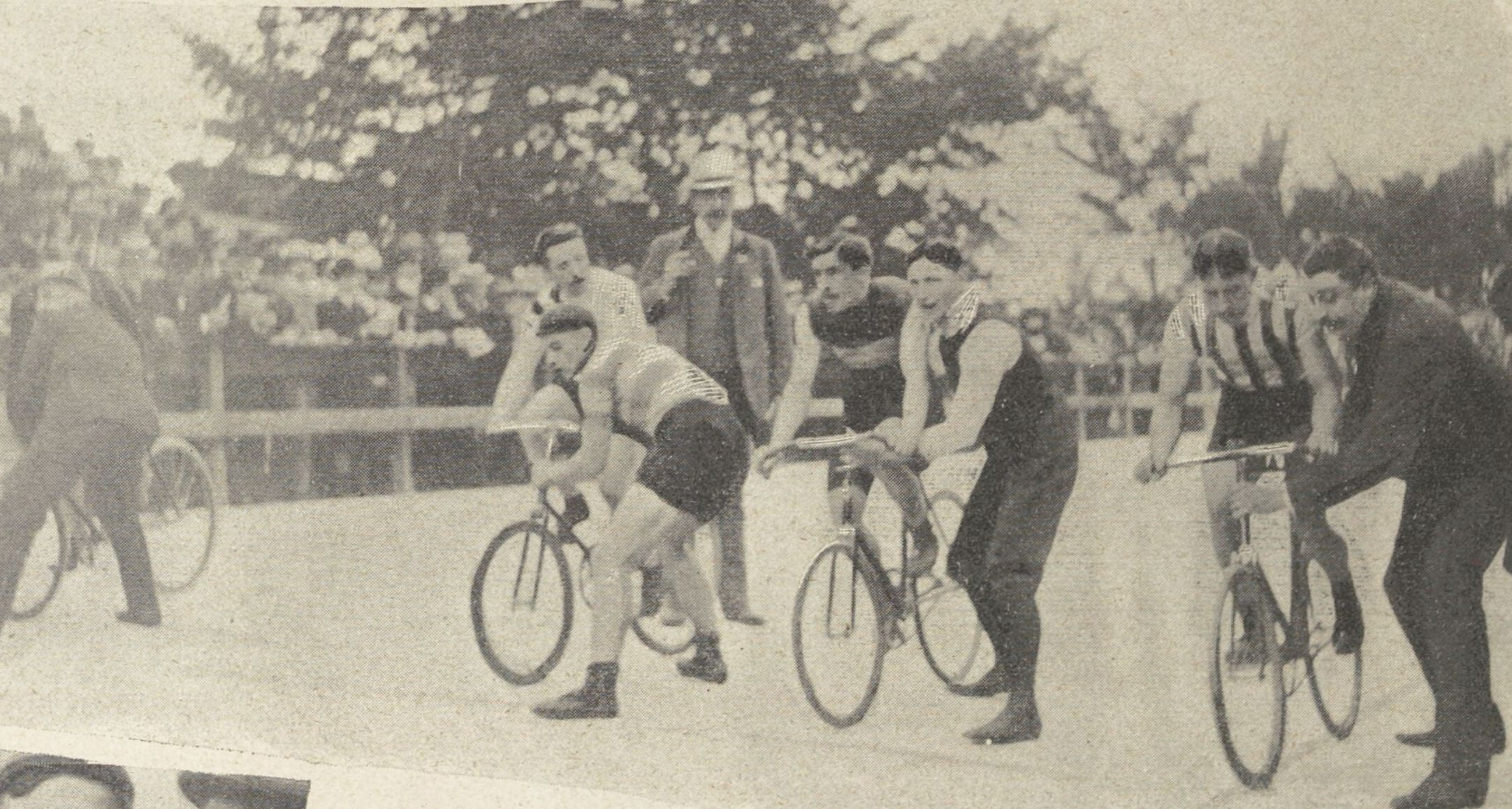
The 1903 Track Cycling World Championships at the Ordrup velodrome in Copenhagen. From left to right: Thaddäus Robl, Alfred Görnemann and Piet Dickentman.

Alfred Görnemann (1 September 1877 – 11 October 1903) was a German cyclist who had his best achievements in motor-paced racing. He started training in this discipline only in 1901, after completing his military service, but quickly became a top competitor. The same year he won a bronze medal at the UCI Motor-paced World Championships and became a champion next year in the amateurs division. In 1903 he turned professional and won another bronze medal.

On 11 October 1903 during a 100 km race in Dresden, while trying to overcome his rival Thaddäus Robl, he collided with his pacer, sustaining a spinal injury and skull fracture. He died the same evening and was buried on 15 October 1903 in Berlin.
