= Thaddäus Robl =

German cyclist (1877–1910)

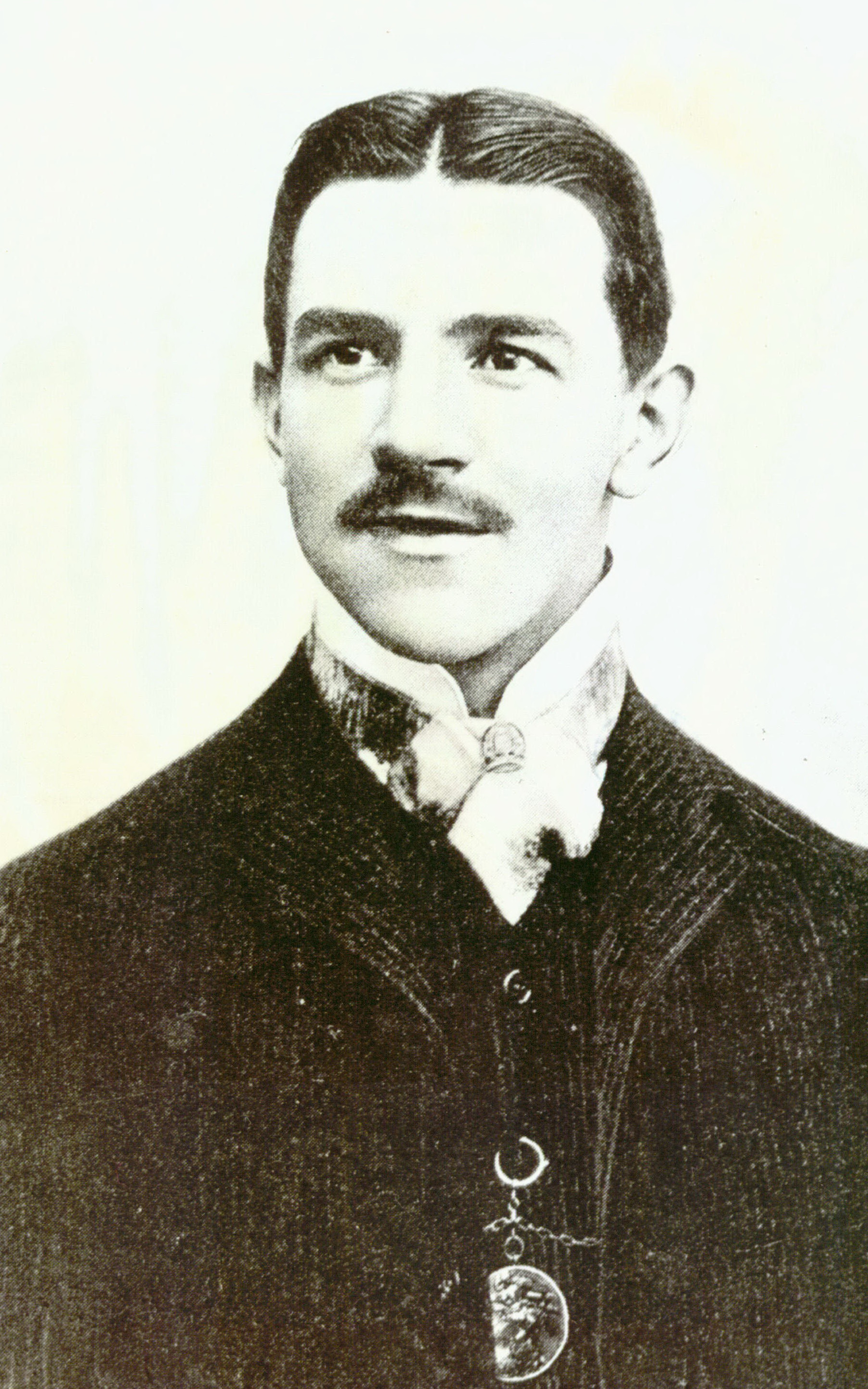

Personal information
- Born: 22 October 1877 Ohlstadt, Germany
- Died: 18 June 1910 (aged 33) Stettin, Germany

Sport
- Sport: Cycling
Medal record
Representing Germany
UCI Motor-paced World Championships
Gold medal – first place	1901 Berlin	Professionals
Gold medal – first place	1902 Rome	Professionals
Silver medal – second place	1903 Copenhagen	Professionals
Motor-paced European Championships
Gold medal – first place	1901 Leipzig	Professionals
Gold medal – first place	1902 Leipzig	Professionals
Gold medal – first place	1903 Leipzig	Professionals
Gold medal – first place	1904 Leipzig	Professionals
Silver medal – second place	1905 Leipzig	Professionals
Bronze medal – third place	1906 Dresden	Professionals
Gold medal – first place	1907 Hannover	Professionals
Bronze medal – third place	1909 Berlin	Professionals

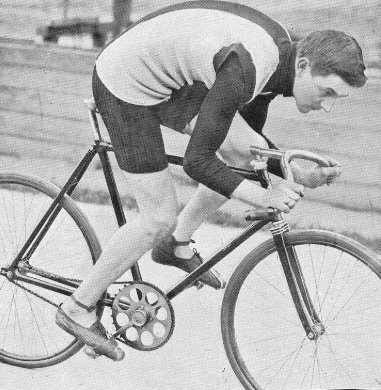
Thaddäus Robl in 1902

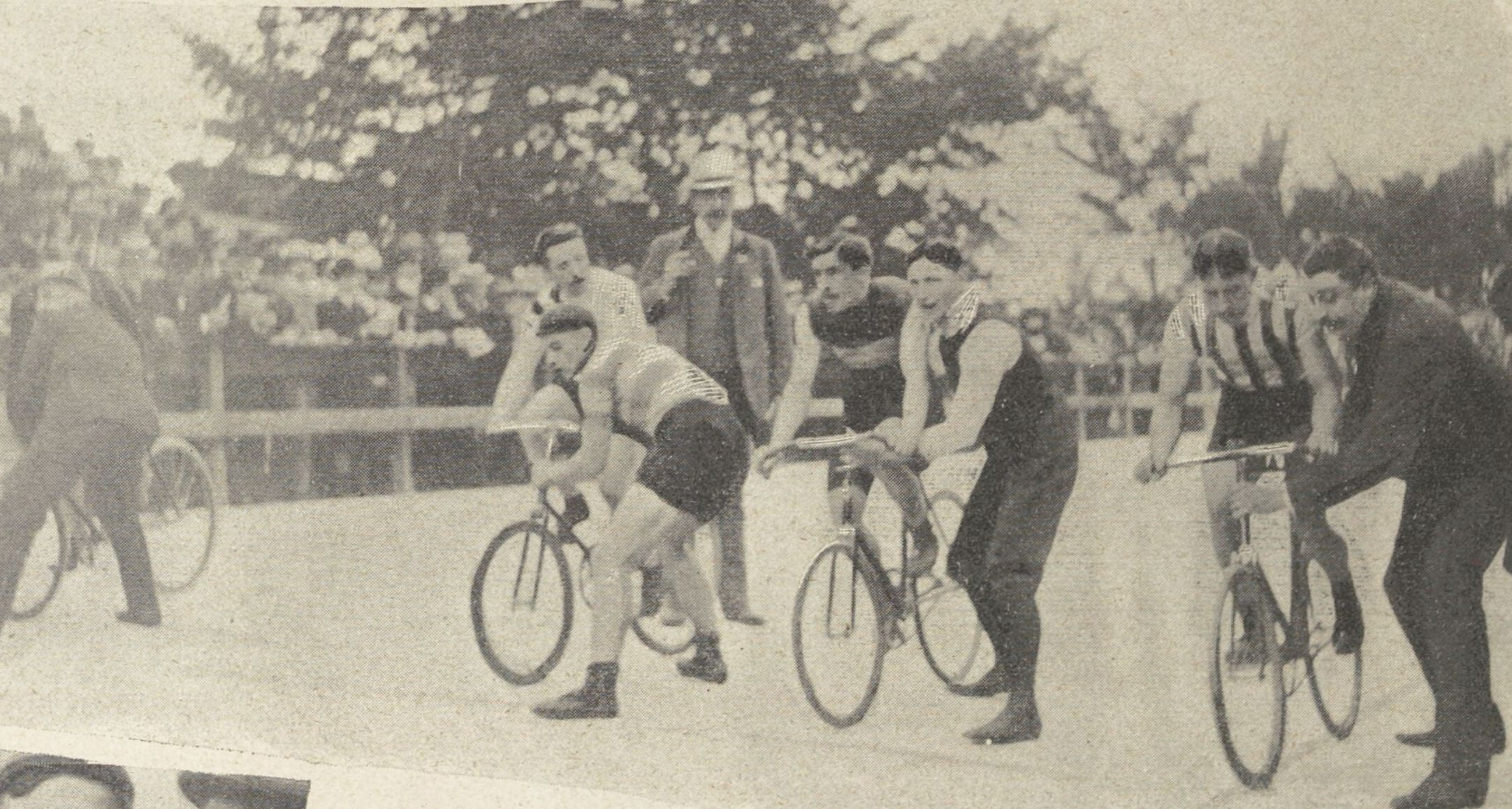
The 1903 Track Cycling World Championships at the Ordrup velodrome in Copenhagen. From left to right: Thaddäus Robl, Alfred Görnemann and Piet Dickentman.

Thaddäus "Thaddy" Robl (22 October 1877 – 18 June 1910) was a German professional cyclist who was active between 1894 and 1910, initially in road racing, later predominantly in motor-paced racing. From 1895 to 1898 he obtained several podium finishes in long-distance road races, the most emblematic of which is his 3rd place in the 1898 Bordeaux - Paris.

In motor-paced racing he won five European titles (1901–1904, 1907) and the world championships in 1901 and 1902, he finished in third place in 1903.

After retiring from cycling he became passionate with flying the early planes. In a flight demonstration on 18 June 1910 in Szczecin (then German Empire) he fell from a height of about 75 meters. This was the first death of a civil pilot on the German ground. In 1947, a street in Munich was named after him.

== Palmares ==
1895
3rd, Wien - Salzburg
3rd, Triest - Graz - Wien
3rd, Straßburg - Basel - Straßburg
5th, Rund um Mitteldeutschland
1896
2nd, German Motor-paced Championship, Hamburg
1898
2nd, Bol d'Or - Paris
3rd, Bordeaux - Paris
1900
2nd, Bol d'Or - Paris
1901
1st, Motor-paced World Championship, Friedenau
1st, Motor-paced European Championship, Leipzig

1902
1st, Motor-paced European Championship, Leipzig
1st, Motor-paced World Championship, Friedenau

1903
2nd, Motor-paced World Championship, Ordrup
1st, Motor-paced European Championship, Leipzig

1904
1st, Motor-paced European Championship, Leipzig

1905
2nd, Motor-paced European Championship, Leipzig

1906
3rd, Motor-paced European Championship, Dresden

1907
1st, German Motor-paced Championship, Breslau
1st, Motor-paced European Championship, Hannover

1908
1st, German Motor-paced Championship, Dresden

1909
3rd, Motor-paced European Championship, Berlin

== See also ==
- Achille Germain
