= Paul Guignard =

French cyclist

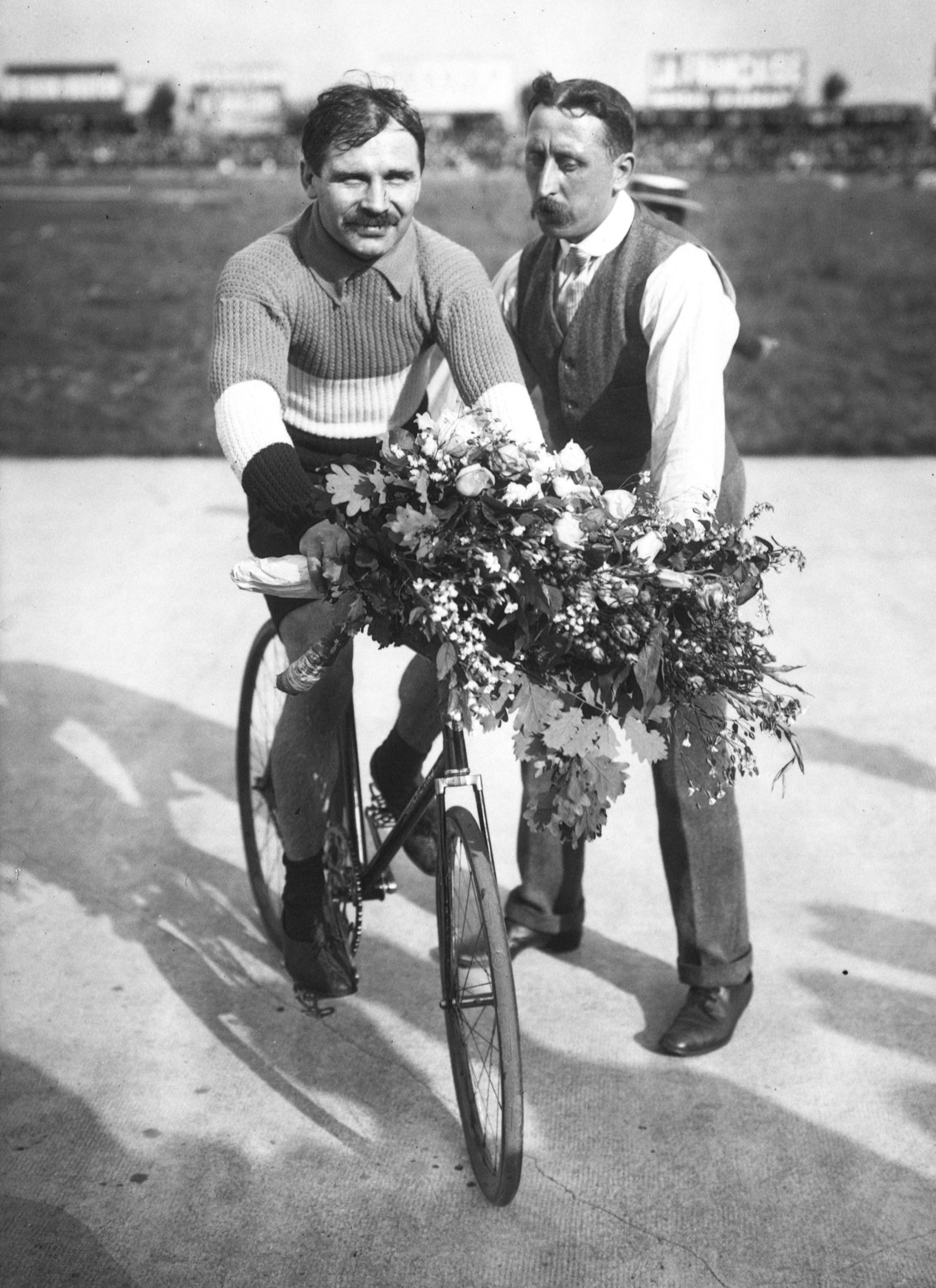
- Paul Guignard in 1912

Personal information
- Born: 10 May 1876 Ainay-le-Château, France
- Died: 15 February 1965 (aged 88) Paris, France

Sport
- Sport: Cycling
Medal record
Representing France
UCI Motor-paced World Championships
Silver medal – second place	1905 Paris	Professionals
Gold medal – first place	1913 Antwerp	Professionals
Bronze medal – third place	1921 Amsterdam	Professionals

Paul Guignard (10 May 1876 – 15 February 1965) was a French professional cyclist who mainly specialized in motor-paced racing. In this discipline he won a gold, silver and bronze medal at the world championships in 1913, 1905 and 1921, respectively, as well as European titles in 1905, 1906, 1909 and 1912.

Guignard began his cycling career as a road racer and in 1895 won the Paris-Besançon 417 km race. After completing his military service he briefly raced as a pilot and won the "Grand Prix of Algiers". He returned to cycling in 1904 and on 8 April 1905 set a new world record in one-hour race at 89.904 km (behind a pacer). He won his last medal at the UCI Motor-paced World Championships in 1921, aged 45.
