= Cees Stam =

Dutch cyclist (born 1945)

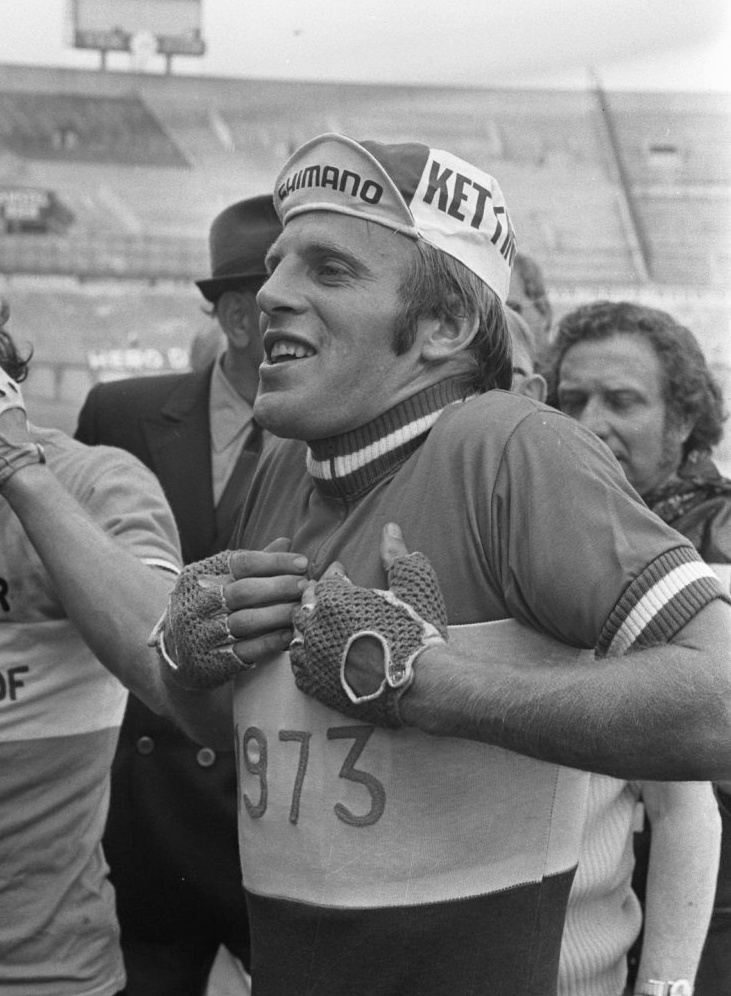
Cees Stam, 1973

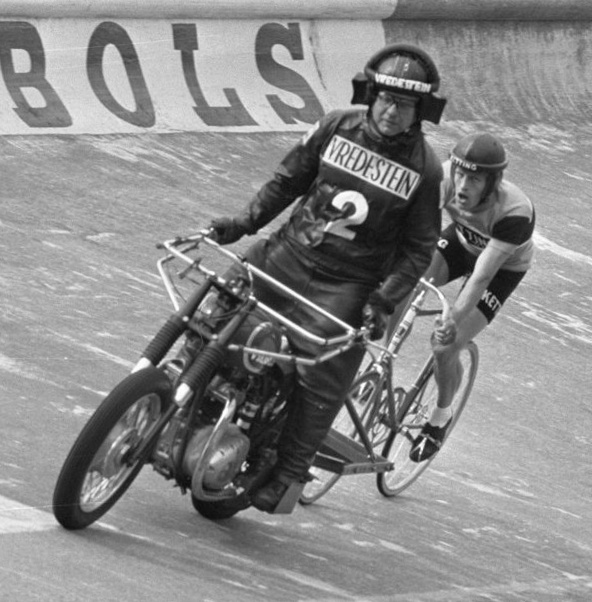
Cees Stam, 1973

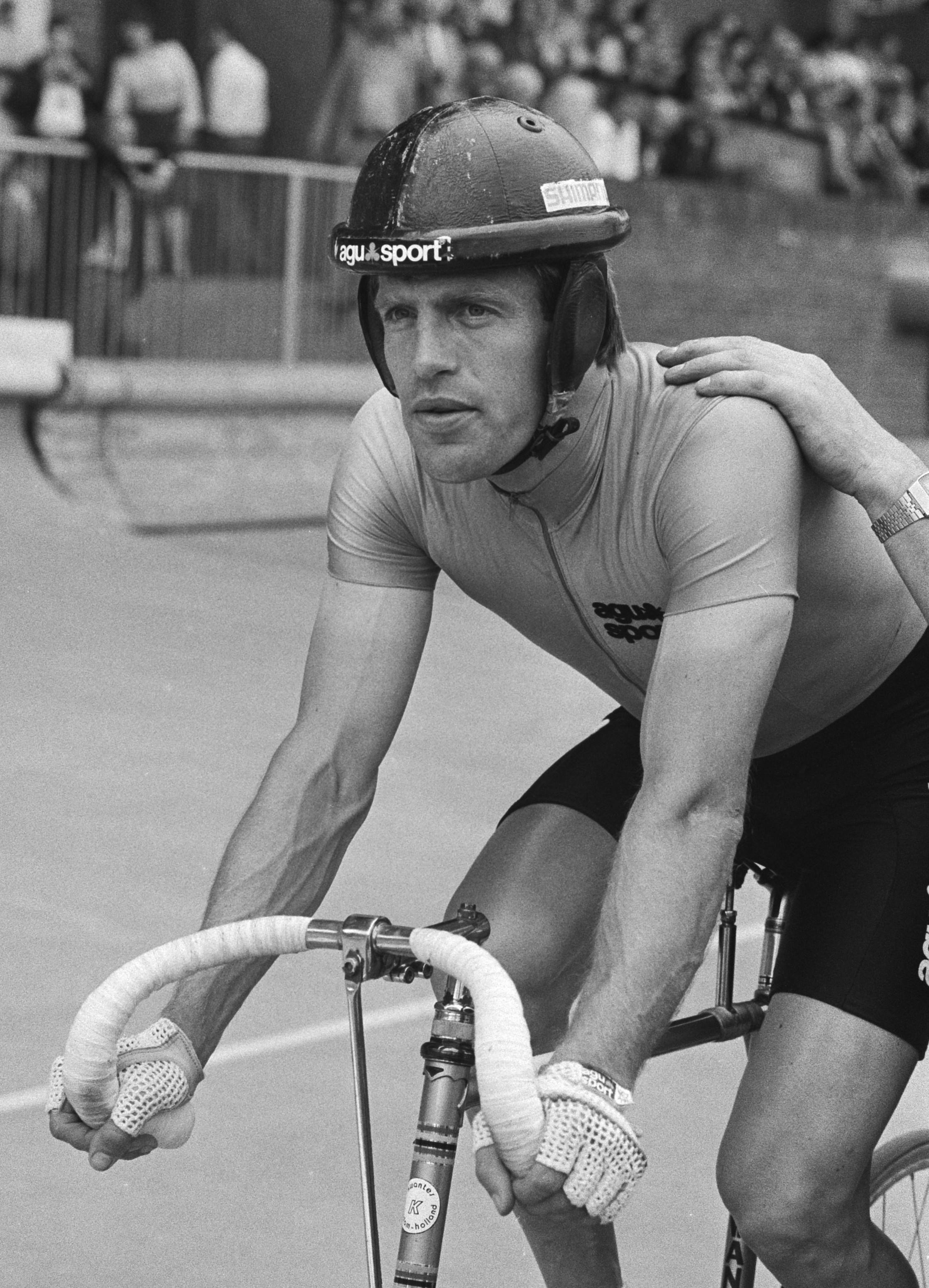
Cees Stam, 1979

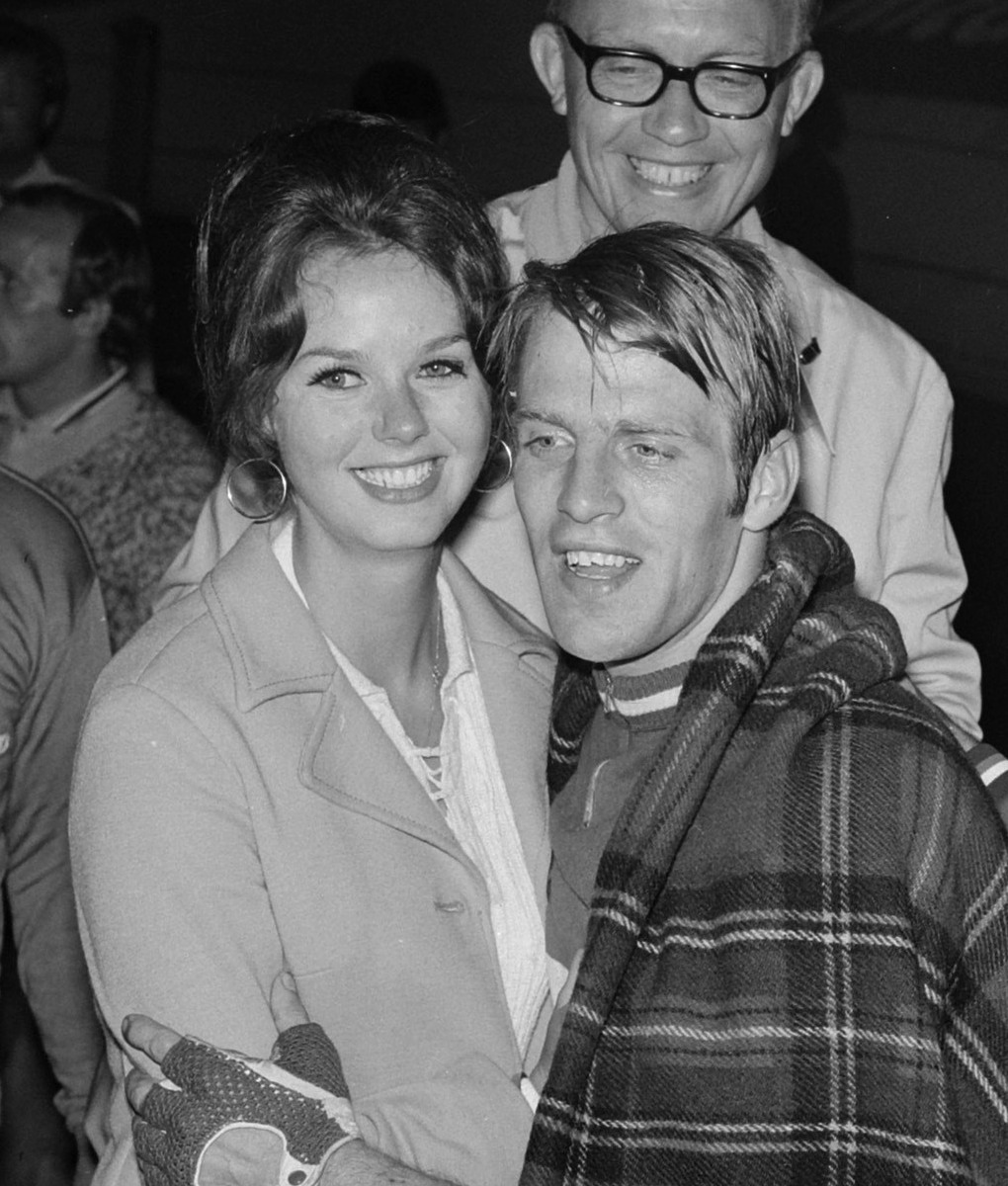
Cees Stam with wife at the 1970 World Championships

Cees Stam (born 2 November 1945 in Koog aan de Zaan) is a former Dutch track cyclist and four-time world champion stayer.

Cees Stam was almost exclusively active as a stayer and at six-day races. In 1968 he became Dutch champion amateur stayer, which feat he would repeat seven times, both as an amateur and as a professional (from 1971 on). In 1968 and 1969 he came in second at the UCI Motor-paced World Championships, but in 1970 he won his first (amateur) world title, with Joop Stakenburg as pacer. Stakenburg also paced him to a professional world championship in both 1973 and 1974, while in 1977 Stam won his fourth world champion paced by Bruno Walrave. Stam came in second in 1972, 1975 and 1976 and third in 1978 and 1979, so that he was on the podium for 8 consecutive years. He also won the European championships twice.

In 1974, in the old Galgenwaard stadium in Utrecht, he set a world hour record cycling behind a motor with 82.998 kilometres.

Stam started 48 six-day races, but did not win any of them. After his cycling career he was national coach of the Dutch stayers and worked as a manager of cycling clothing company AGU until his retirement in 2007.

Cees Stam is the father of the racing cyclist Danny Stam. His former son-in-law Henk Havik is also a cyclist, as is his grandson Yoeri Havik and uncles Klaas and Willy Kwantes.

In 2007, a book was published about him and his cycling family.

In 2014 Stam suffered a serious crash when riding the derny in the 2014 edition of the Six Days of Amsterdam, which featured his grandson Yoeri Havik as a competitor. This crash ended his career as a pacer.
