= 1903 UCI Track Cycling World Championships =

Cycling tournament

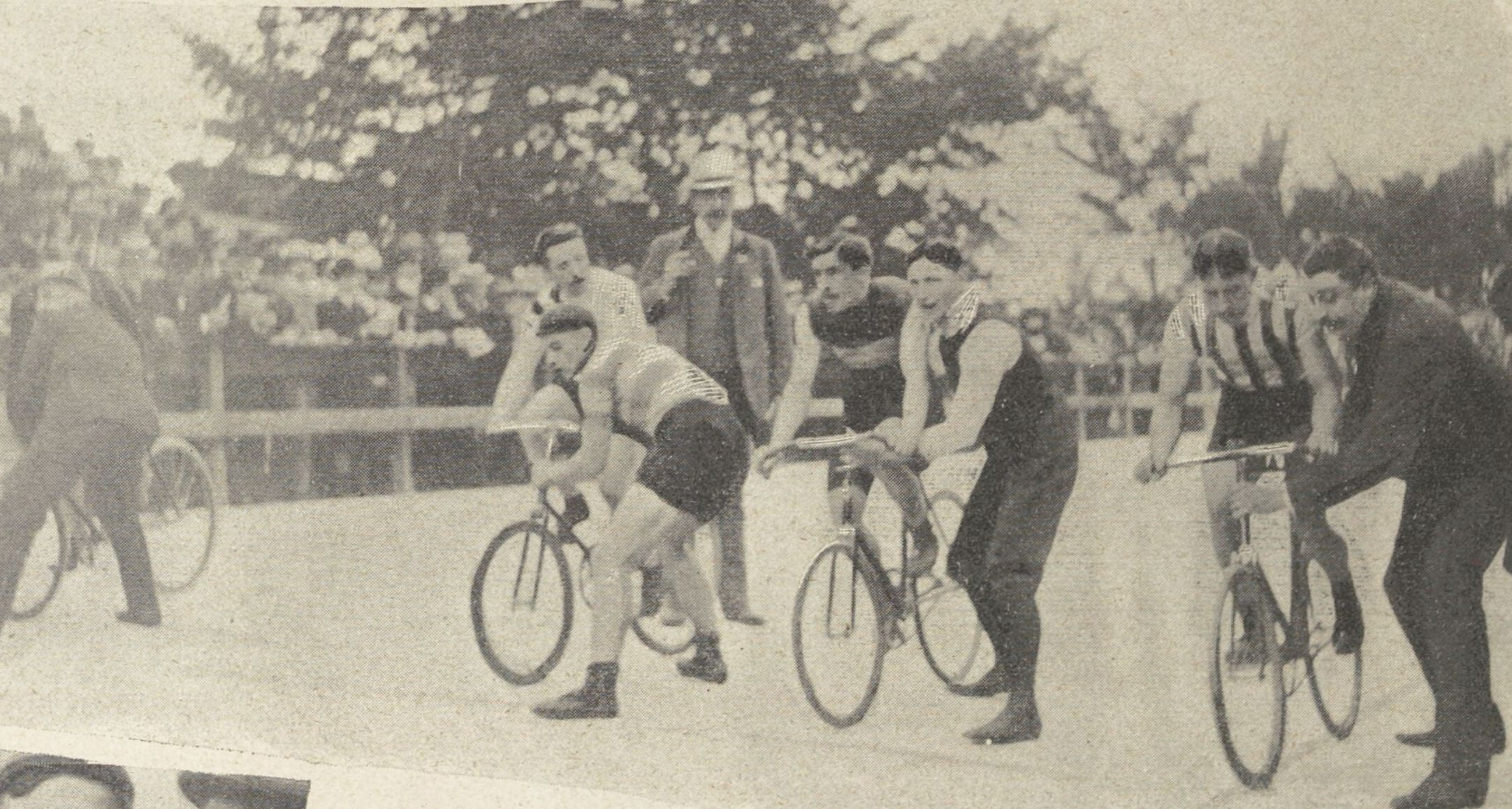
- The 1903 Track Cycling World Championships at the Ordrup velodrome in Copenhagen. From left to right: Thaddäus Robl, Alfred Görnemann and Piet Dickentman.
- Venue: Copenhagen, Denmark
- Date: 16–22 August 1903
- Velodrome: Ordrup velodrome
- Events: 4

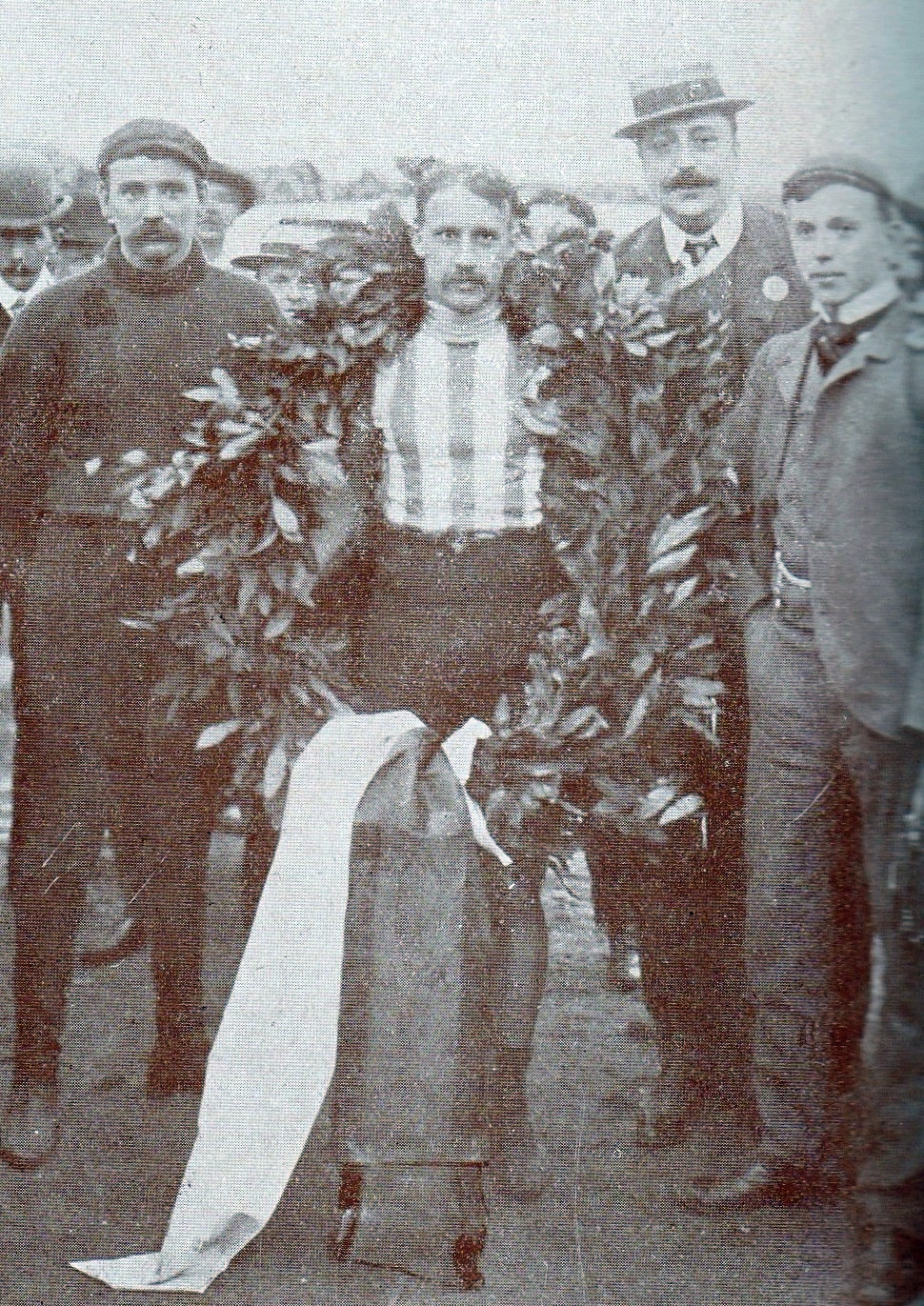
Piet Dickentman as world champion of the professional men's motor-paced event.

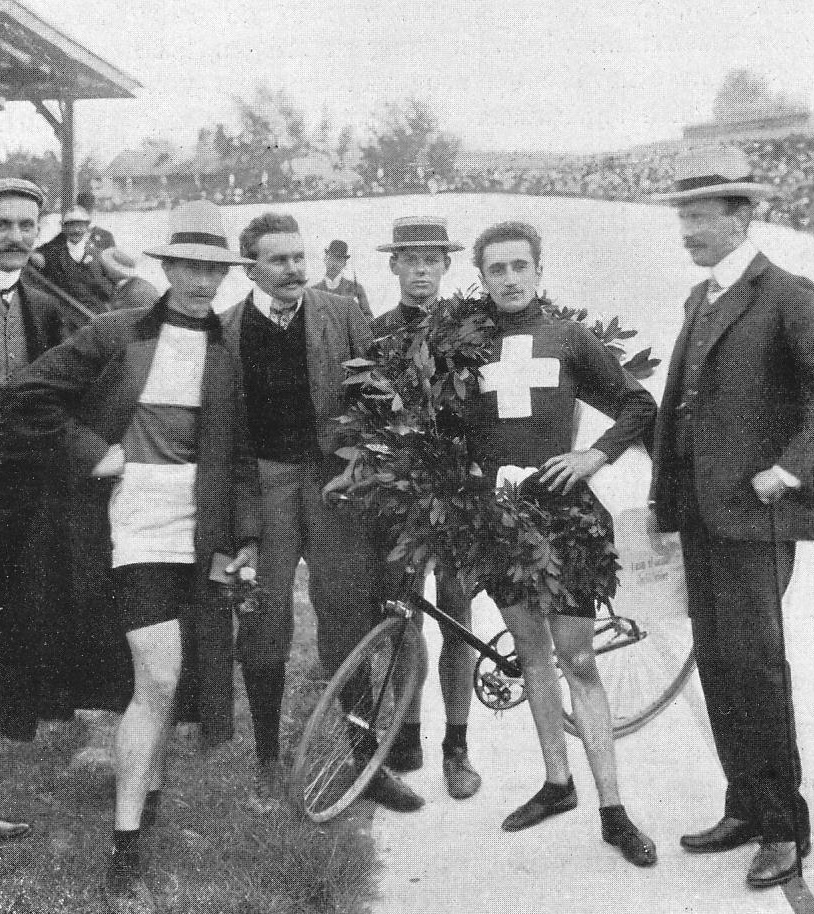
Edmond Audemars as world champion of the amateur's men's motor-paced event.

The 1903 UCI Track Cycling World Championships were the World Championship for track cycling. They took place in Copenhagen, Denmark from 16 to 22 August 1903. Four events for men were contested, two for professionals and two for amateurs.

== Medal summary ==
| Event | Gold | Silver | Bronze |
|---|---|---|---|
Men's Professional Events
| Men's sprint | Thorvald Ellegaard; Denmark | Willy Arend; Germany | Harie Meyers; Netherlands |
| Men's motor-paced | Piet Dickentman; Netherlands | Thaddäus Robl; Germany | Alfred Görnemann; Germany |
Men's Amateur Events
| Men's sprint | Arthur Reed; Great Britain | Jimmy Benyon; Great Britain | C. Hellemann; Denmark |
| Men's motor-paced | Edmond Audemars; Switzerland | Vittorio Carlevaro; Italy | Reinhold Herzog; Germany |

== Medal table ==
| Rank | Nation | Gold | Silver | Bronze | Total |
|---|---|---|---|---|---|
| 1 | Great Britain (GBR) | 1 | 1 | 0 | 2 |
| 2 | Denmark (DEN) | 1 | 0 | 1 | 2 |
| 2 | Netherlands (NED) | 1 | 0 | 1 | 2 |
| 4 | Switzerland (SUI) | 1 | 0 | 0 | 1 |
| 5 | Germany (GER) | 0 | 2 | 2 | 4 |
| 6 | Italy (ITA) | 0 | 1 | 0 | 1 |
| Totals (6 entries) | | 4 | 4 | 4 | 12 |
