= Max Hürzeler =

Swiss cyclist

Personal information
- Born: 4 July 1954 (age 71) Dübendorf, Switzerland

Sport
- Sport: Cycling
Medal record
Representing Switzerland
Motor-paced World Championships
Bronze medal – third place	1981 Brno	Amateurs
Silver medal – second place	1984 Barcelona	Professionals
Gold medal – first place	1987 Vienna	Professionals

Max Hürzeler (born 4 July 1954) is a retired Swiss cyclist. After winning a bronze medal at the UCI Motor-paced World Championships in 1981 in the amateurs division he turned professional and won a silver medal in 1984 and a gold medal in 1987. He also won three European (1983, 1986 and 1987) and seven national titles (1981–1987) in motor-paced racing.

After retiring from competitions he founded a cycling holidays company in Mallorca and improved the roads in the area. Using the money earned from the company he financially supported the Sixday-Nights Zürich race.
