= Ordrup velodrome =

Former velodrome in Kopenhagen, Denmark

Ordrupbanen
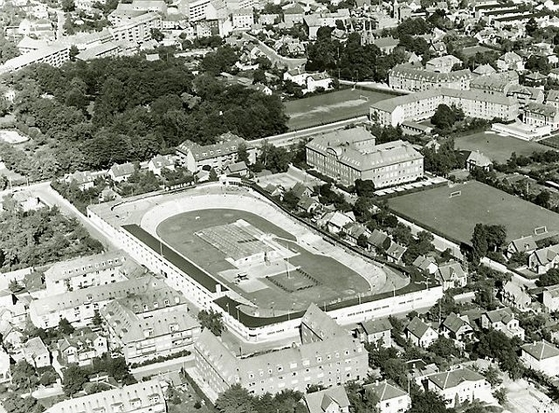
- Ordrup velodrome in 1956

- Location within Denmark
- Address: Copenhagen; Denmark
- Location: Ordrup
- Coordinates: 55°45′44″N 12°34′47″E
- Capacity: 16,000
- Surface: Cement

Construction
- Opened: 29 July 1888
- Closed: 2000
- Years active: 1888–2000

The Ordrup Velodrome or Ordrupbanen was a cycling arena in Ordrup near Copenhagen, Denmark. The track was built on Ejgaarden's land in the Gentofte Municipality in 1888 and was closed in 2000. It hosted the world track cycling championships for a record of nine times: in 1896, 1903, 1909, 1914, 1921, 1931, 1949, and 1956.

The Ordrup Velodrome had its heyday from about 1935 to 1955, with Danish world stars such as Thorvald Ellegaard and Willy Falck Hansen repeatedly drawing full houses to the velodrome. For cyclists, competing at Ordrup was desirable because of its large number of spectators, good conditions, large prize money, and reputation for having frequent, competitive cycling races. During that era, spectators hung on the roofs around the track, where up to 16,000 spectators could be seen. After the war, it was riders such as Kay Werner and Palle Lykke who attracted big crowds.

== History ==
2000 poster to the final event in the velodrome.

The track first premiered on 29 July 1888. It was a 333 1/3 m long sand track without raised corners. In 1893, it was replaced with a second, cement track of the same length with slightly raised corners. After a major renovation in 1903, it was replaced with a third cement track that was 370 m long and 9 meters wide with 40 degree turns.

Between 1930 and 1931, Henning Hansen built a 110-metre-long grandstand facing Brannersvej. In 1935, a new referee's tower and cabin building were also added. The cabin house replaced the round equestrian centre from 1895, which had been in use for forty years.

In the 1960s, the track became part of a match-fixing scandal. Two cyclists and three organizers were sent to prison for fixing matches between 1967 and 1969.

The track was replaced for a fourth time, with construction completing on 10 May 1987. The new track was 1.80 metres shorter (368.20 m). Due to the ongoing renovations, the Ordrup track was not used for competitions in 1986. After the renovation, the races held at the velodrome were primarily of interest to those participating in parimutuel betting.

A final race held on 3 September 2000 marked the end of the Danish Bicycle Club's 120-year history at Ordrupbanen. The track was then the world's oldest existing cycle track. The sale of the old track brought the Danish Bicycle Club 18 million DKK. This money was used to build the cycling arena in Ballerup. Today, the area where the Ordrup track was located has been developed with housing and a new era has begun with the construction of Ballerup Super Arena.

== Gallery ==
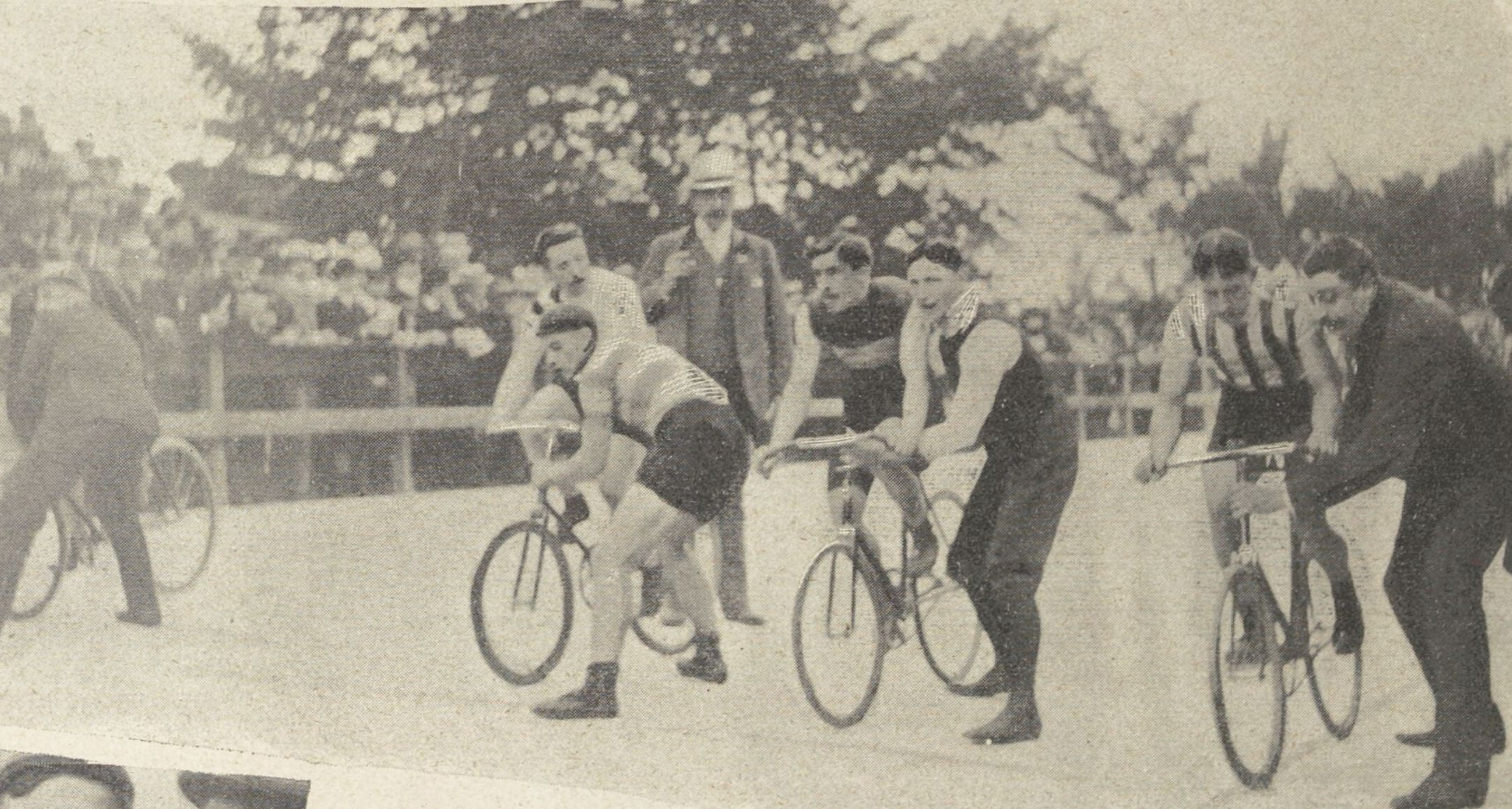
The 1903 Track Cycling World Championships at the Ordrup velodrome. From left to right: Thaddäus Robl, Alfred Görnemann and Piet Dickentman.

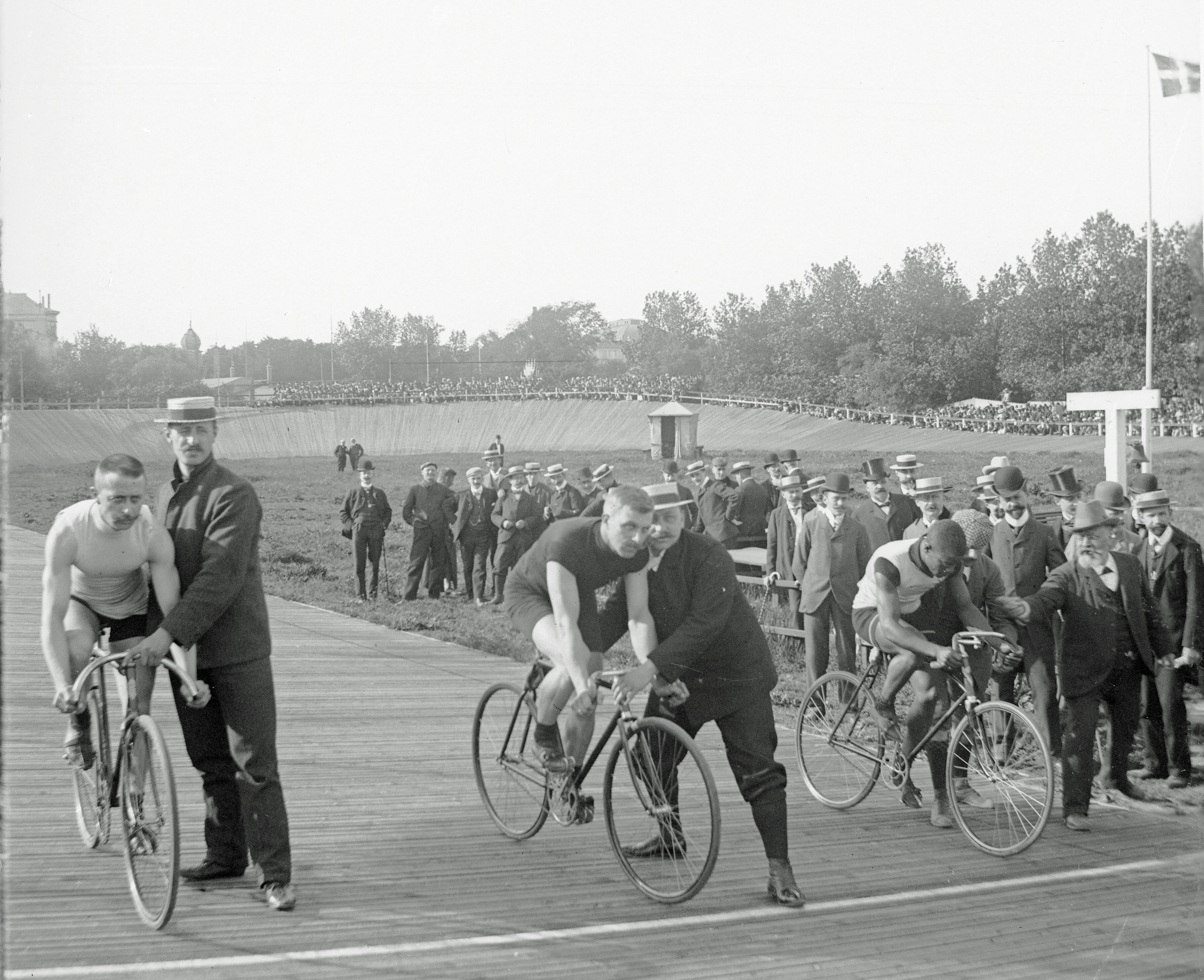
Cyclists being propped up at the starting line of the Dansk Bicykle-Klubs summer conference in 1907.

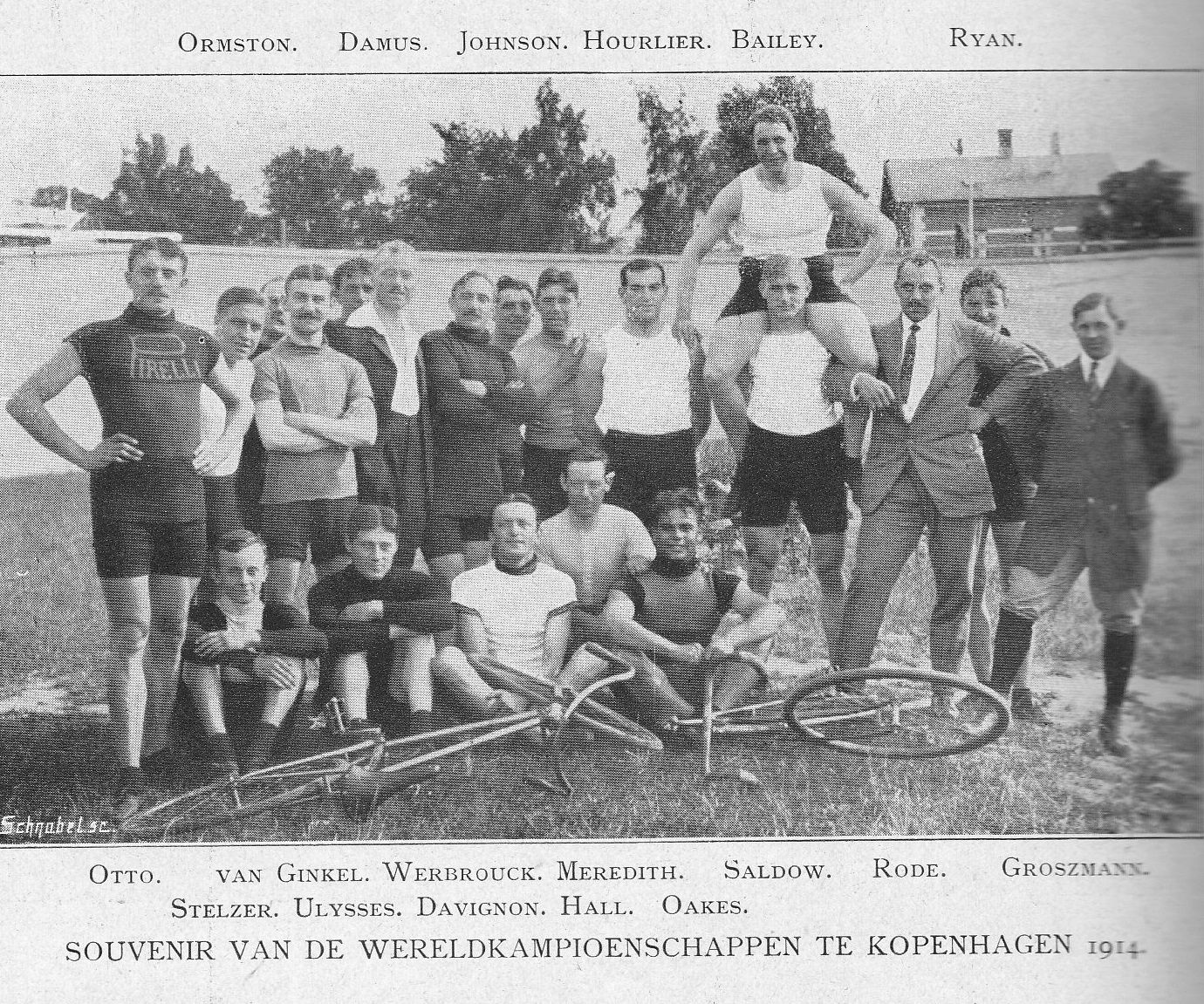
Group photo of competitors at the 1914 Track Cycling World Championships at the Ordrup velodrome.

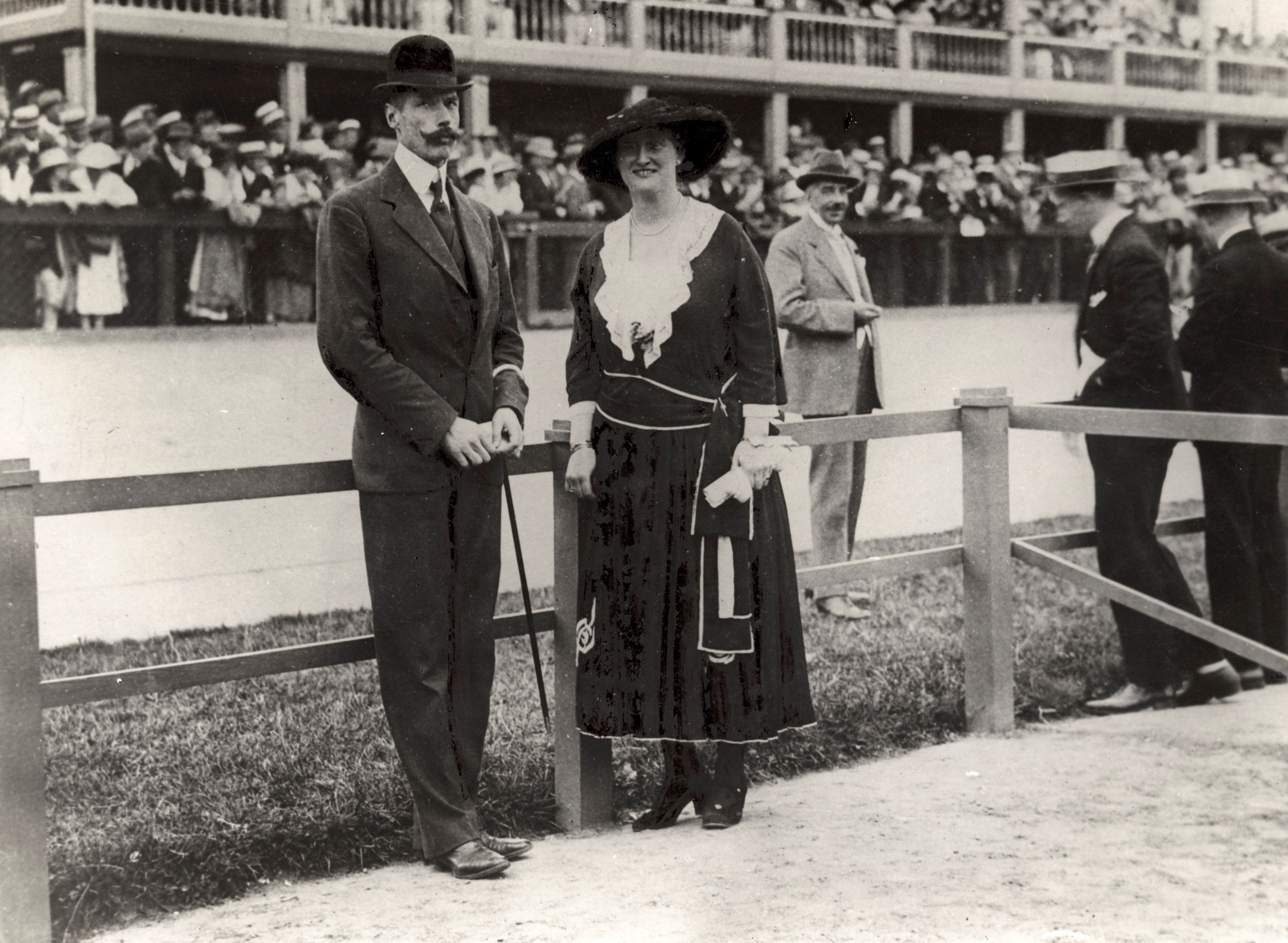
Prince Harald and Princess Helena of Denmark attending the 1921 world track cycling championships at the Ordrup velodrome.

== See also ==
- List of cycling tracks and velodromes
