= 1914 UCI Track Cycling World Championships =

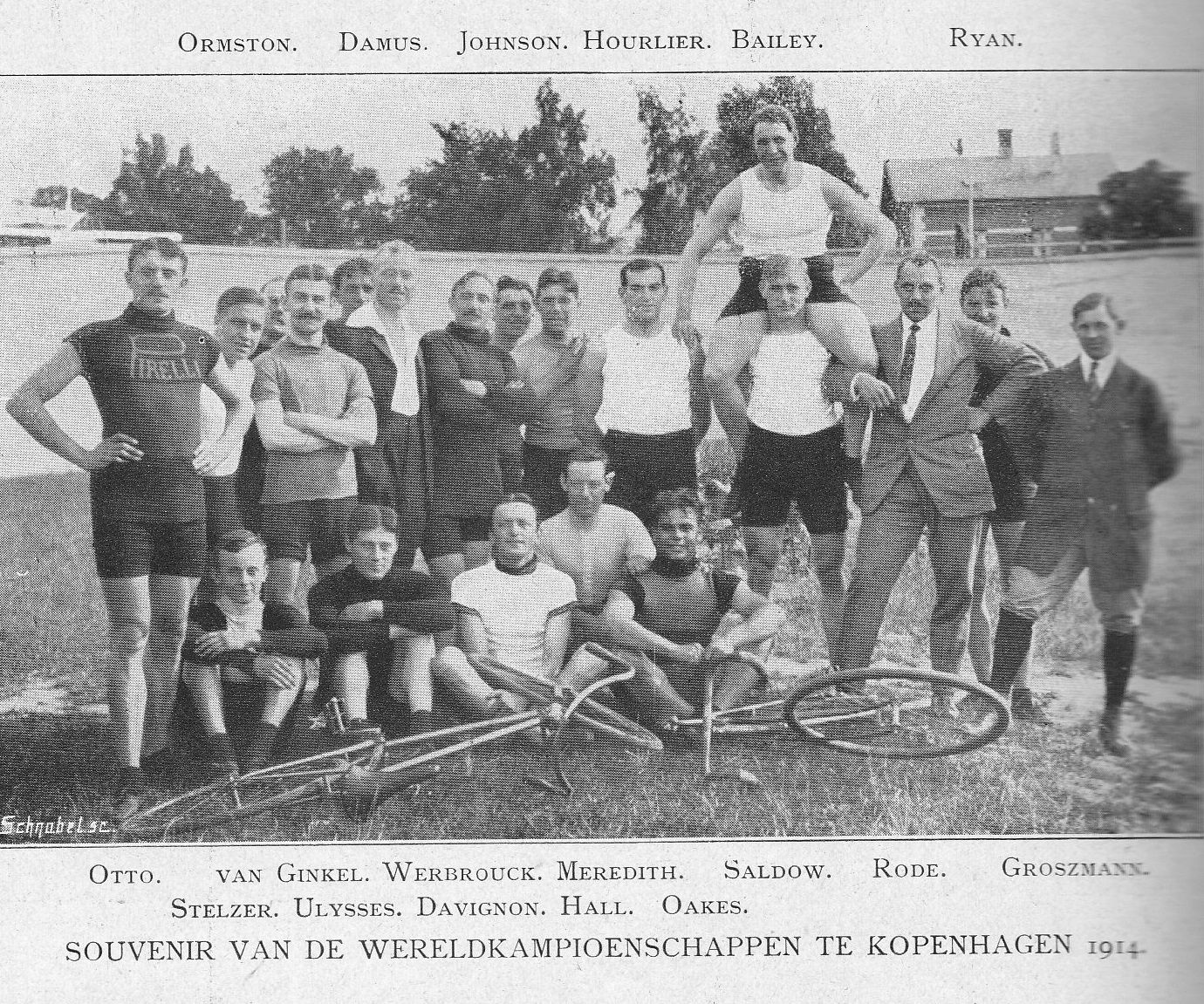
- Group photo of competitors
- Venue: Copenhagen, Denmark
- Date: 2 August 1914
- Velodrome: Ordrupbanen
- Events: 1

The 1914 UCI Track Cycling World Championships were the world championship for track cycling. They took place in Ordrup near Copenhagen, Denmark, on 2 August 1914. One event for men was contested; more events were scheduled but were canceled because World War I had started, and contestants rushed home.

== Medal summary ==
Event	Gold	Silver	Bronze
Men's Professional Event
Men's motor-paced	Cor Blekemolen; Netherlands	Jacques Van Ginkel; Belgium	Walter Stelzer; Germany

== Medal table ==
Rank	Nation	Gold	Silver	Bronze	Total
1	Netherlands (NED)	1	0	0	1
2	Belgium (BEL)	0	1	0	1
3	Germany (GER)	0	0	1	1
Totals (3 entries)		1	1	1	3
