= Albert Walters =

British cyclist (1870–1956)

- Walters around 1899

Personal information
- Full name: Albert Edward Walters
- Nickname: Jenny Walters
- Born: 3 April 1870 London, England
- Died: 20 February 1956 (aged 85)

Cycling career
- Sport: Cycling
- Disciplines: Track; Road

Amateur team
- 1892–1895: Old Tenisonians C.C., Polytechnic C.C.

Professional team
- 1895–1901: Individual

Major wins
- Bol d'Or (1899)
Medal record
Men's track cycling
Representing United Kingdom
Summer Olympics
Second place	1900 Paris	100 miles (professionals)
European Championships
Silver medal – second place	1899	demi-fond

Albert Edward Walters, also known as Jenny Walters (3 April 1870 - 20 February 1956), was an English road and track cyclist.

== Biography ==
Albert Walters began racing in 1892 as a member of the Old Tenisonians Cycling Club. He won six races during the season; in 1893, he won six major events, and in 1894 he won twenty-four, including the 100-mile championship of the Polytechnic Cycling Club and the twelve-hour race, the Anchor Shield at Herne Hill Velodrome, which he won ahead of Arthur Chase, setting a new record of just over 415 km....

In 1895, Walters turned professional and made his debut in Paris on Christmas Day in a motor-paced match against Arthur Linton. He finished second in the Vase d'Or at Catford, a twelve-hour race spread over three days.

Although Walters was primarily a solo cyclist, he also tried tandem racing, with Arthur Chase and later with Émile Bouhours.

Walters at a 1900 British-French competition

In 1897, he won two track events, the Abingdon Shield and the Vase d'Or at Catford. In 1898, a 100 km match was held between Walters, Bouhours and Fred Armstrong at the Parc des Princes.

The greatest victory of his career came at the Bol d'Or in 1899. He set a world record for distance in a motor-paced event with 1,020.977 km. In the same year, he won Paris–Dijon, finished second in the European demi-fond championship and won the Six Days of Berlin, bringing his season's earnings to more than £1,000.

The following year, the 24-hour race was included in the 1900 Summer Olympics programme as a non-medal event; Walters finished second in the 100-mile race. Walters appeared certain to retain his 24-hour title and led from the start until the 20th hour, when a knee injury and exhaustion forced him to retire. He was ultimately classified sixth, behind the Dutch winner, Matthieu Cordang. Before losing the lead, Walters set a new world record for every hour from the 3rd through the 19th. He thereby set the world record for eight hours behind a pacer, covering 384.566 km.

Walters was also a bike designer. Walters retired from competitive cycling in 1901. He went into business with his brother and opened a tailoring establishment under the name Walters Bros on Regent Street in London and took up motorsport.

== Achievements ==
1899
1st Bol d'Or
1st Goldenes Rad von Berlin
(silver) European Track Cycling Championships (stayer)
2nd 100 miles for professionals during the 1900 Summer Olympics.
1st Berlin Four Days
1st Paris–Dijon

=== Records ===
- 1895: 50 miles (amateur record)
- 1895: 100 miles (amateur record)
- 1897: Vase d'Or at Catford
- 1897: Twelve-hour road record.
- May 1897: 100 km record at Crystal Palace – 2 h 9 min 13.8 s
- 1897: World record for three hours behind a pacer at the Catford track, covering 142.500 km
- 1900: World record for eight hours behind a pacer, covering 384.566 km.
- World record for 24 hours behind pacers
