= Ehrenfried Rudolph =

German cyclist (born 1935)

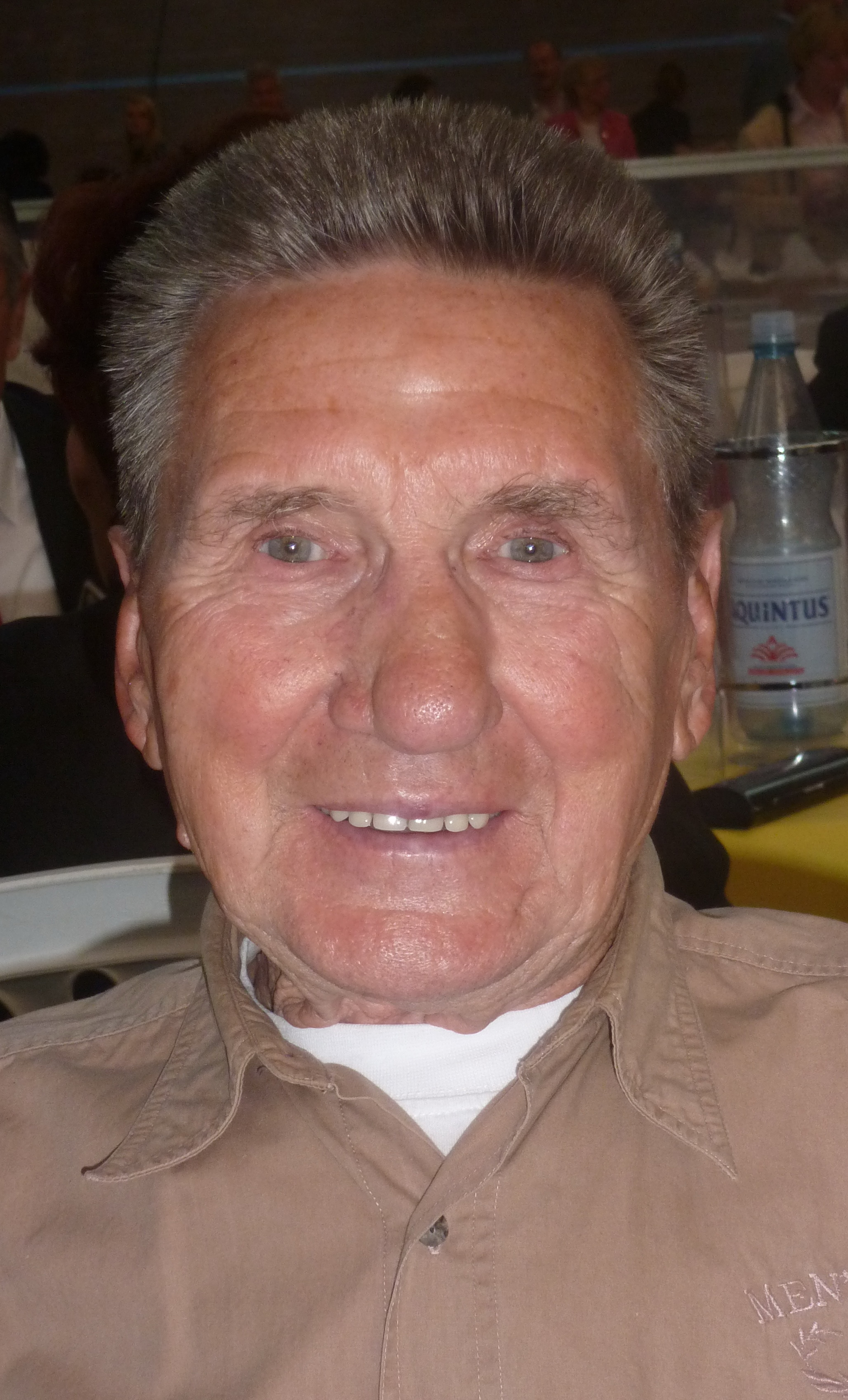
- Ehrenfried Rudolph in 2011

Personal information
- Born: 14 August 1935 (age 90) Krefeld, Germany

Sport
- Sport: Cycling
Medal record
Representing West Germany
UCI Motor-paced World Championships
Silver medal – second place	1966 Frankfurt	Professionals
Bronze medal – third place	1968 Rome	Professionals
Gold medal – first place	1970 Leicester	Professionals

Ehrenfried Rudolph (born 14 August 1935) is a retired German cyclist who was active between 1957 and 1973. He won three medals at the UCI Motor-paced World Championships in 1966, 1968 and 1970, including a gold medal in 1970.

As a road cyclist he competed in 69 six-day races, with the best result of fourth place.

After retiring from cycling he became a pacer in motor-paced racing.
