= Karl-Heinz Marsell =

German cyclist

Personal information
- Born: 1 August 1936 Dortmund, Germany
- Died: 23 September 1996 (aged 60) Dortmund, Germany

Sport
- Sport: Cycling
Medal record
Representing West Germany
UCI Motor-paced World Championships
Gold medal – first place	1961 Zurich	Professionals
Bronze medal – third place	1964 Paris	Professionals

Karl-Heinz Marsell (1 August 1936 – 23 September 1996) was a German professional cyclist who was active between 1955 and 1966, predominantly in motor-paced racing. In this discipline he won the world championships in 1961 and finished in third place in 1964; he also won three European (1955, 1957 and 1959) and three national titles (1960, 1961 and 1963).
