= Piet Dickentman =

Dutch cyclist (1879–1950)

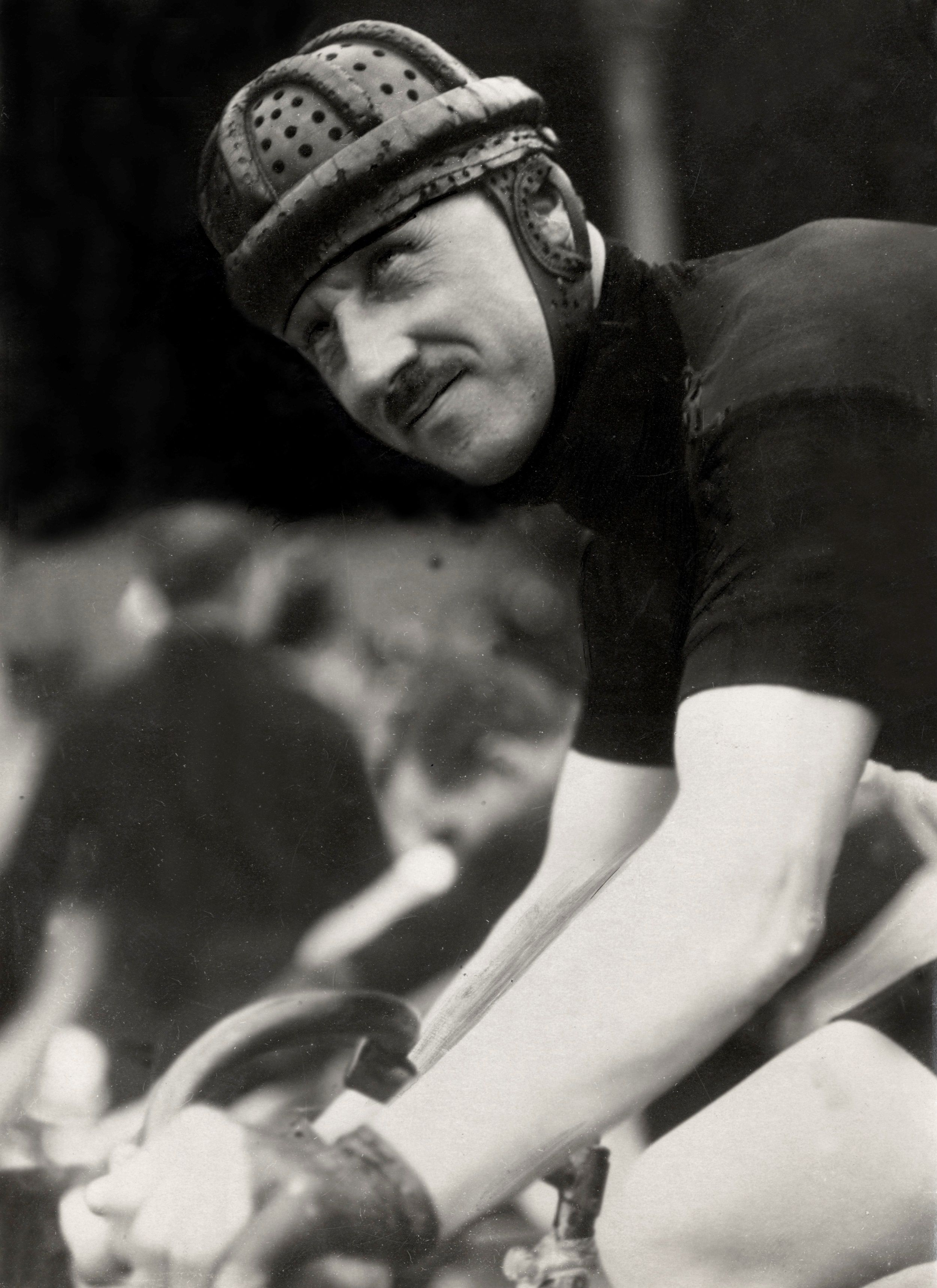
- Piet Dickentman in 1920

Personal information
- Born: 4 January 1879 Amsterdam, the Netherlands
- Died: 7 October 1950 (aged 71) Amsterdam, the Netherlands

Sport
- Sport: Cycling
Medal record
Representing the Netherlands
UCI Motor-paced World Championships
| Silver medal – second place | 1901 Berlin | Professionals |
| Gold medal – first place | 1903 Copenhagen | Professionals |
| Bronze medal – third place | 1905 Antwerp | Professionals |

Pieter Casper Johan "Piet" Dikkentman (4 January 1879 – 7 October 1950) was a professional cyclist from the Netherlands. He had a long a successful career spanning from 1885 to 1928, which peaked in 1903 when he won the UCI Motor-paced World Championships. He competed internationally and married twice, to an Australian and to a German. Consequently, while he lived most of his life in Amsterdam, he also spent years in Germany and Australia.

== Biography ==
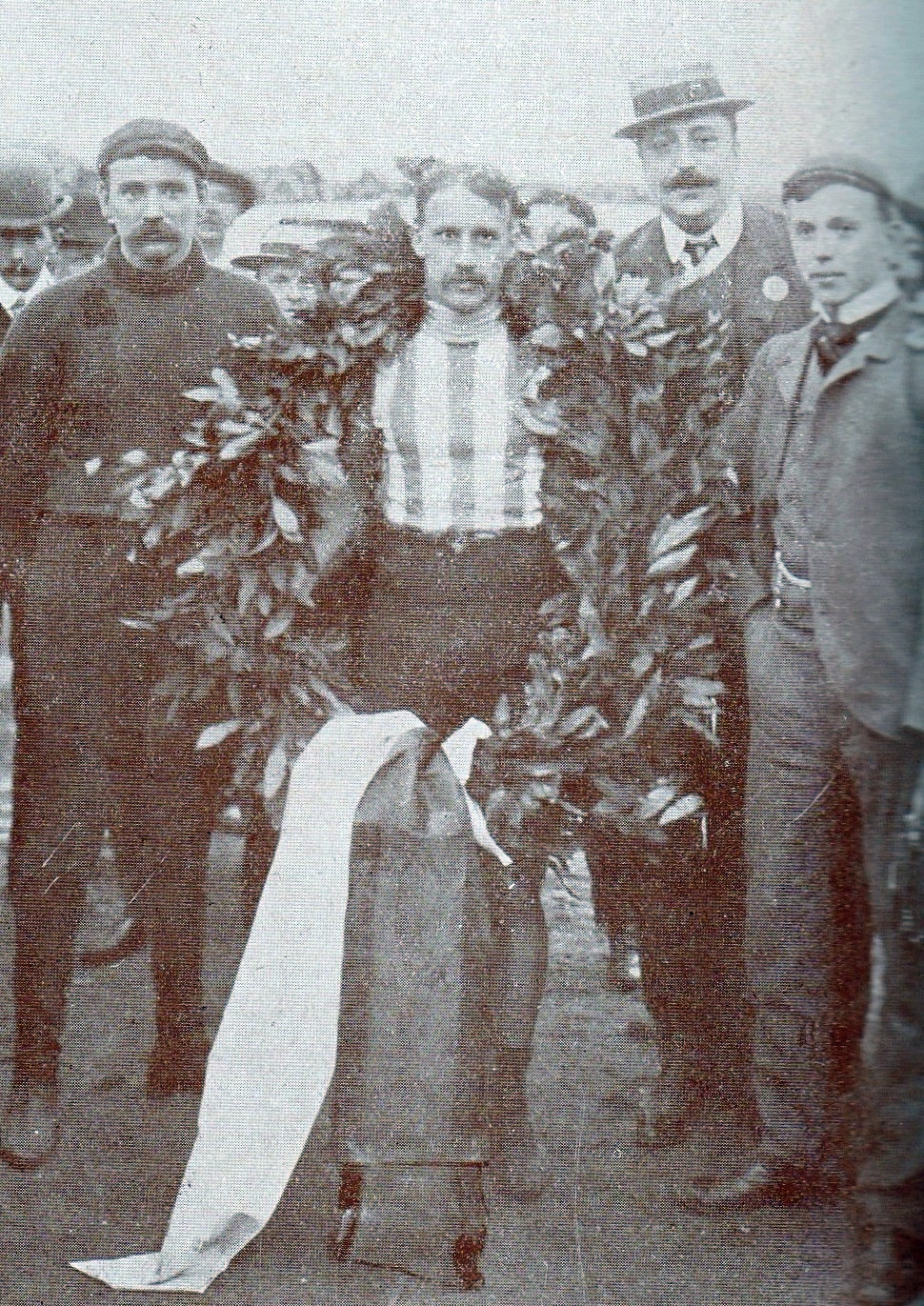
Piet Dickentman as world champion at the 1903 Track Cycling World Championships at the Ordrup velodrome in Copenhagen.

He was born in Amsterdam to Pieter Casper Dikkentman, a carpenter, and Sophia Diederica Boekstal. After finishing school he trained as mechanical engineer. He began competing in cycling at the age 16 and specialized in sprint. He was noticed by Jan Mulder, who made him a member of his quint, a type of tandem bicycle ridden by a team of five cyclists. In this discipline Dikkentman won a world title in 1898, and set a new world record (500 meters in 28.6 seconds) in 1899. Around that time he became professionally involved in motor-paced racing. This event was difficult for him, as he had 10 crashed during his career as well as a strong rivalry with the German cyclist Thaddäus Robl; this rivalry, however, made him famous in Germany. Especially difficult was for him the 1904 season when he had a long recovery after being hit by a pacer. Nevertheless, he won three medals at the UCI Motor-paced World Championships, in 1901, 1903 and 1905, including a gold medal in 1903, as well as five European medals (in 1900, 1901, 1903, 1904 and 1907).

After these successes, Dikkentman, who was a self-managing professional cyclist, became a wealthy man. Yet, for many years he kept a strict daily routine of training and diet. He also followed all technical developments in the design of bicycles and pacing motorcycles. However, his career declined in the late 1900s due to the lack of a good pacer, and he eventually retired in 1913.

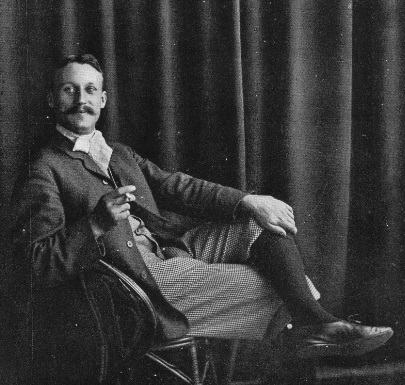
Piet Dickentman

Dikkentman competed all around the world, including Japan and Australia. On 27 February 1908 he married Lilian Brasker, an Australian. The couple had a daughter, Edna Victoria (b. 1909 in South Yarra, Victoria), and divorced on 11 July 1917. On 14 March 1918 he married again, to Emilie Agnes Minna Zöphel, a German. They had one son and three daughters.

While working at his bicycle shop, Dikkentman could not stand the retirement and returned to cycling in the 1920s, finishing in second-third place in the national motor-paced championships in 1921–1923. In 1927, he won a race in Amsterdam in a record time. He retired from active cycling after a race in Szczecin, Poland, on 28 October 1928, aged 49. He continued competing as a pacer, but without much success. In his late years he ran a bicycle shop in his native Amsterdam, where he died in 1950.
