= Carsten Podlesch =

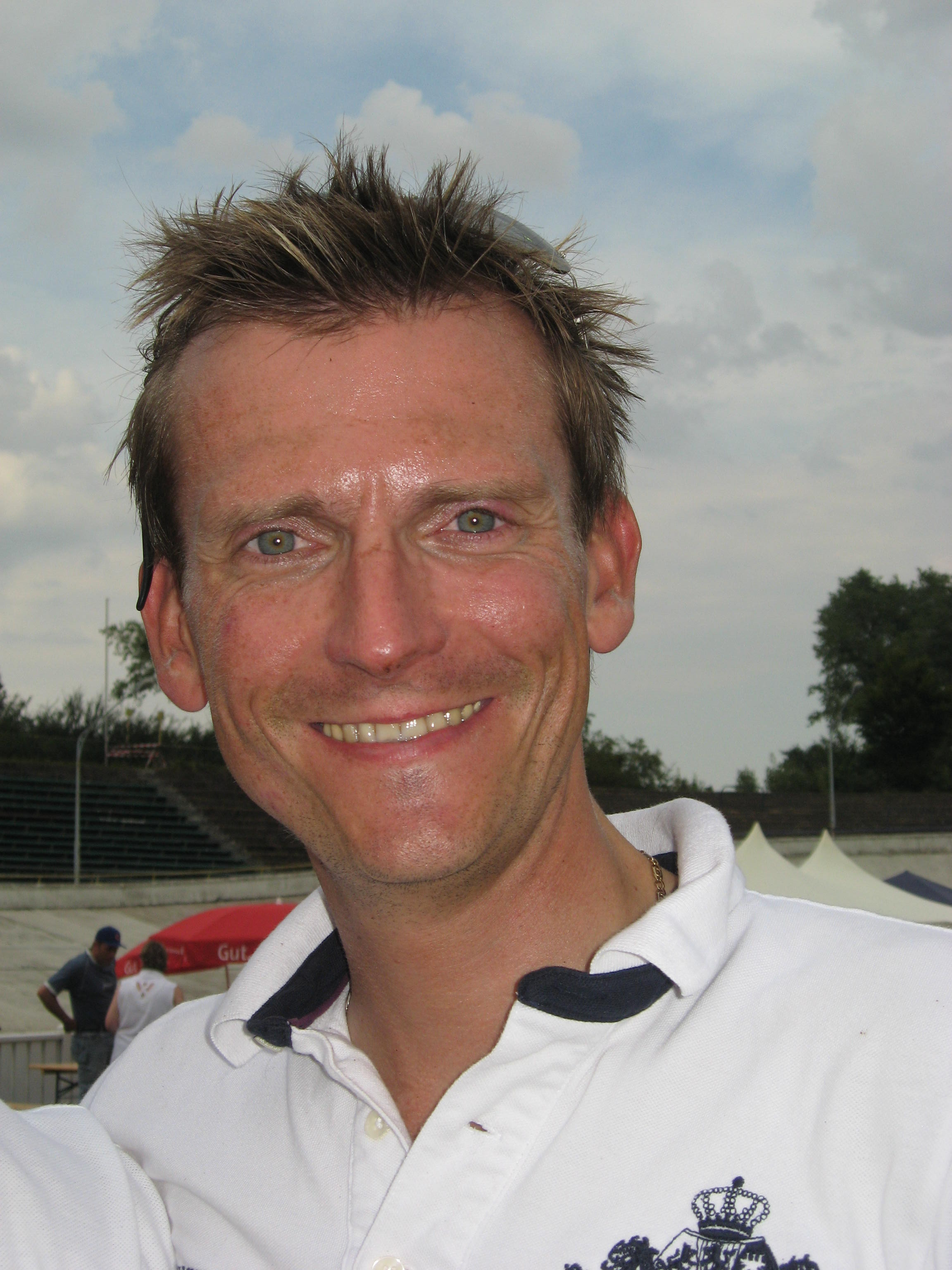
Carsten Podlesch

Carsten Podlesch (born 6 September 1969 in Berlin) is a German stayer and the World Champion in motor-paced racing.

== Career ==
Podlesch comes from a family that has been very involved in motor-paced racing. His father Rainer Podlesch was an Amateur World Champion twice, and his uncle Karsten Podlesch used to operate as a pacer. Podlesch became a stayer at the age of 19. During his career that spanned almost four decades he gained the World Championship twice, European Championship thrice, and the German Championship thirteen times making him one of the most successful motor-paced cyclists ever. With his uncle as pacer the Podlesch/Podlesch team gained the 2000 European Championship. In 1994 Podlesch won the last UCI World Championship with his pacer Dieter Durst - the UCI ceased conducting this event subsequently as too few nations were competing - and thus remains the reigning and "forever" champion.

Podlesch retired from motor-paced racing in 2008.

== See also ==
- UCI Motor-paced World Championships
