= Franz Schiewer =

German cyclist

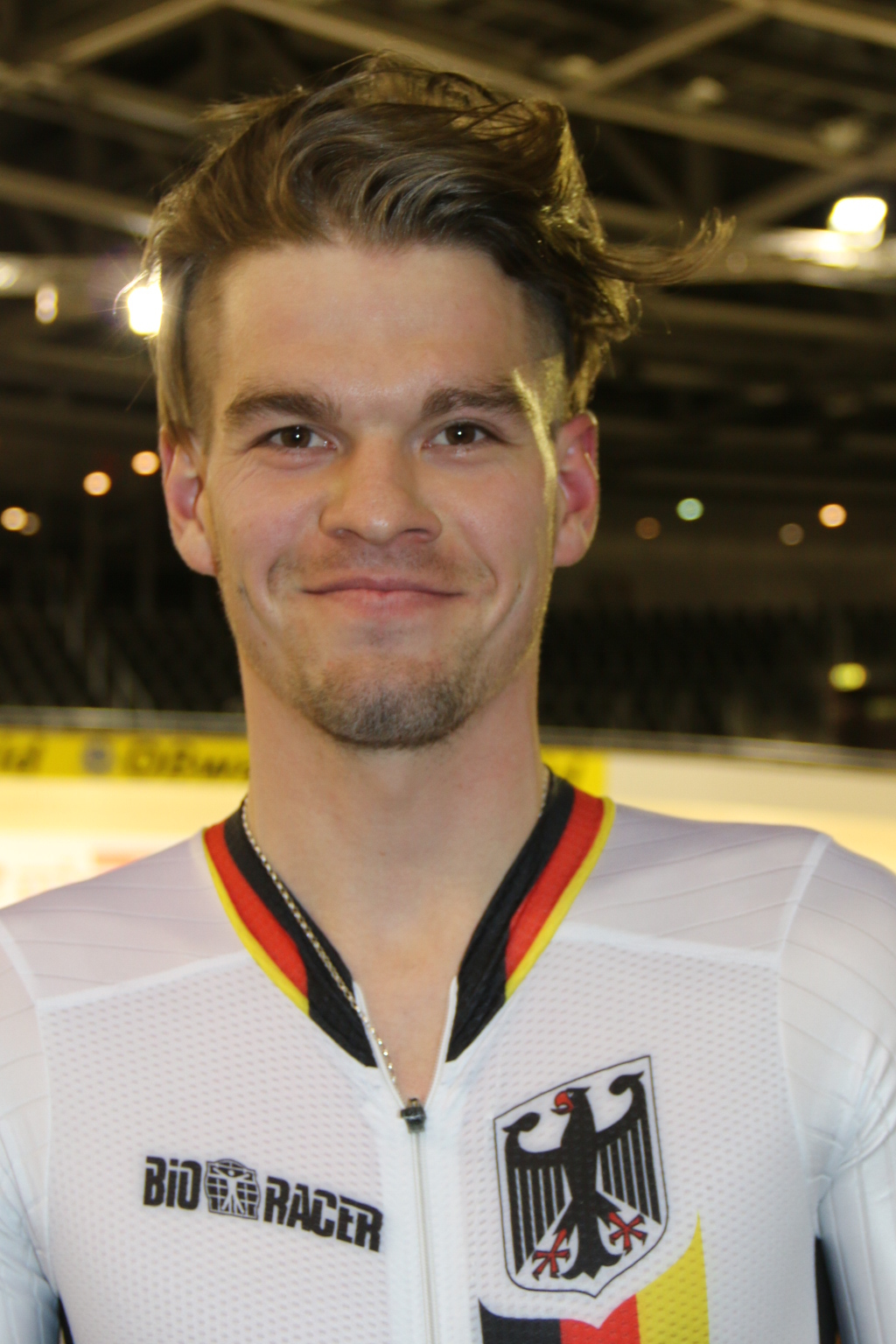
- Franz Schiewer (2017)

Personal information
- Born: 15 November 1990 (age 35) Forst (Lausitz), Germany
- Height: 1.84 m (6 ft 0 in)
- Weight: 70 kg (154 lb)

Cycling career
- Sport: Cycling
- Disciplines: Track; Road
- Role: Rider

Amateur teams
- 2004: PSV 1893 Forst/L.
- 2005–2008: RSC Cottbus
- 2017: RK Endspurt 1909 Cottbus
- 2018: Triebwerk–Energy CT
- 2019: MTS–Triebwerk Cycling

Professional team
- 2009–2016: LKT Team Brandenburg

Franz Schiewer (born 15 November 1990) is a German track and road cyclist. He competed in the points race event at the 2011 UCI Track Cycling World Championships.

== Major results ==
2008
2nd Overall 3-Etappen-Rundfahrt
2009
1st Overall Tour de Berlin
2010
1st Points race, National Track Championships
7th Overall Tour de Berlin
2011
National Track Championships

1st Team pursuit
2nd Scratch

2013
1st Team pursuit, National Track Championships
2016
2nd Stayer, UEC European Track Championships
2017
1st Stayer, UEC European Track Championships
2018
1st Stayer, UEC European Track Championships
