= Stefan Schäfer =

German bicycle racer

Stefan Schaefer
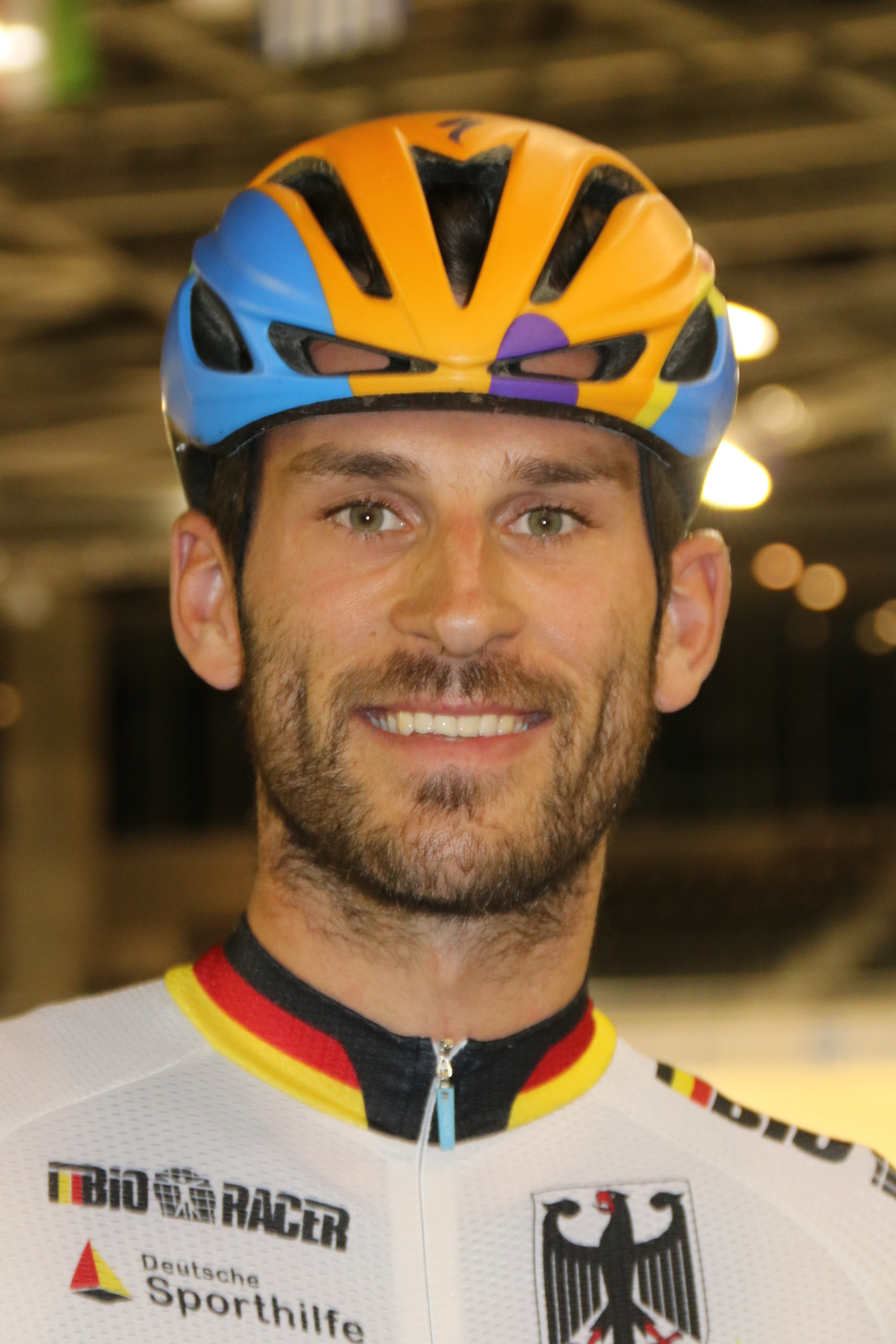
- Schäfer in 2017

Personal information
- Full name: Stefan Schäfer
- Born: 6 January 1986 (age 40): Forst, Bezirk Cottbus, East Germany; (now Germany)

Cycling career
- Sport: Cycling
- Current team: RSC Cottbus
- Disciplines: Track; Road
- Role: Rider
- Rider type: Pursuit (track)

Amateur teams
- 2004–2007: RSC Cottbus
- 2015–: RSC Cottbus
- 2015–2016: Maloja Pushbikers
- 2018: TEKKERZ

Professional teams
- 2008–2011: LKT Team Brandenburg
- 2010: Team Milram (stagiaire)
- 2011: Team NetApp (stagiaire)
- 2012–2013: Team NSP–Ghost
- 2014: LKT Team Brandenburg

Stefan Schäfer (born 6 January 1986) is a German road and track cyclist. He competed in the individual pursuit and team pursuit event at the 2012 UCI Track Cycling World Championships.

== Major results ==
2003
National Junior Road Championships

3rd Road race
3rd Time trial

2004
National Junior Road Championships

2nd Road race
3rd Time trial

3rd Time trial, UCI Junior Road World Championships
2005
3rd Time trial, National Under-23 Road Championships
2007
3rd Time trial, National Under-23 Road Championships
2008
1st Stage 1 Thüringen Rundfahrt der U23
2nd Time trial, National Under-23 Road Championships
2009
1st Team pursuit, National Track Championships
1st Memoriał Henryka Łasaka
2nd Overall Okolo Slovenska
2010
1st Team pursuit, National Track Championships
1st Stage 2 Tour de Serbie
1st Stage 5 Tour of Bulgaria
3rd Overall Course de Solidarność et des Champions Olympiques
2011
1st Team pursuit, National Track Championships
1st Overall Tour of Greece

1st Stages 4 & 5

1st Stage 4 Cinturón a Mallorca
2012
6th Memoriał Henryka Łasaka
2013
National Track Championships

1st Individual pursuit
1st Team pursuit

3rd Overall Course de Solidarność et des Champions Olympiques
2014
1st Individual pursuit, National Track Championships
1st Stage 3 Istrian Spring Trophy
3rd Banja Luka–Belgrade II
6th Banja Luka–Belgrade I
7th Himmerland Rundt
8th Central European Tour Košice–Miskolc
8th Central European Tour Budapest GP
9th Rund um Köln
2015
1st Madison, National Track Championships (with Christian Grasmann)
