= Motor-paced racing =

Cycling behind a pacer

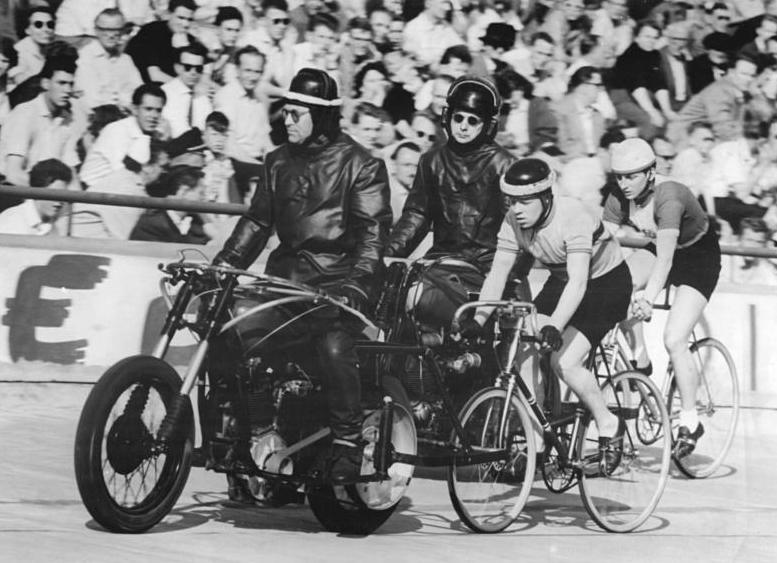
Motor-paced racing, Berlin-Weißensee, 1958

Motor-paced racing and motor-paced cycling refer to cycling behind a pacer in a car or more usually on a motorcycle. The cyclist (or stayer in this case) follows as close as they can to benefit from the slipstream of their pacer. The first paced races were behind other cyclists, sometimes as many as five riders on the same tandem. Bordeaux-Paris and record attempts have been ridden behind cars. More usually races or training are behind motorcycles.

== Origins of pacing ==
Cyclists started to use tandem bicycles as pacers in the late 19th century. There could be as many as five riders on the pacing machine. Because of the long distances covered when following a pacer, these cyclists were called stayers, a term used in long-distance horse racing. Companies such as Dunlop sponsored pacing teams, and "tens of thousands" turned out to watch. A south London rider, J. W. Stocks, set British record of 32 miles 1,086 yards (52.492 km) in an hour behind a Dunlop quintuplet on 27 September 1897. The pacing tandems were ridden by professionals, of whom as many as 100 were under contract. Each competitor had six to eight pacing teams for races between 50 and 100 miles (80 and 160 km).

Speeds rose when engines were added to pacing tandems. Arthur Chase and the Frenchman Émile Bouhours set English records behind powered tandems in 1898 and 1899. Chase used a 4 1/2 bhp (4.6 PS) motorcycle to pace him to 37 miles 196 yards (59.725 km) in a private test at The Crystal Palace, south London, in July 1900 but riders in the USA and in Paris had already done better. Some races mixed pacing with solo bicycles, tandem and motorcycle, with the riders given different start points in compensation.

== Pacing by car ==
Bordeaux–Paris, a race of nearly 600 km (370 mi) from south-west France to the capital, was paced part of the way by cars in 1897, 1898 and 1899. So was Paris–Roubaix. The historian Pierre Chany said: "Cars made only a brief appearance in Paris–Roubaix. On the roads of the north, these noisy cars, high with wooden wheels with their tires nailed in place, raised huge clouds of dust. The drivers, wearing leathers, their eyes protected by huge goggles, were stepping into the unknown! The riders hidden in all this chaos could see absolutely nothing and risked their life at 50 km/h (31 mph) on the edge of a razor. The noise was infernal and the column advanced in the stink of exhaust pipes."

== Pacing by motorcycle ==
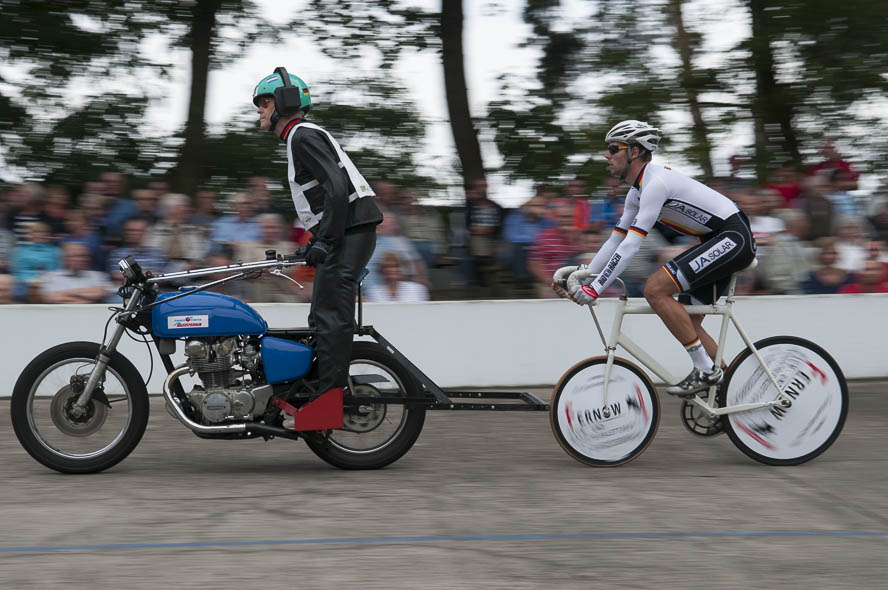
Florian Fernow (stayer) with pacer Peter Bäuerlein at the 2013 European Championships

The first races were limited more by the speed a motorcycle could achieve than the ability of the rider to follow, with 50 km/h (31 mph) being a good average, according to the historian H. M. Ellis. The races became faster as the pacers became faster. Paced races kept audiences enthralled for many decades in Europe and, at one time, in North America. Tens of thousands watched, especially in Germany. The popularity of this form of pacing declined in the latter part of the 20th century.

There were few rules. Pacing machines had small rollers set sideways behind the back wheel to avoid crashes caused by the rider touching the back of the motorcycle, but there were few other regulations. Race distances extended to six days, although one-hour and 100-mile (160 km) contests were more common. Windshields were briefly allowed but abandoned after the world championship in 1904.

Speeds rose and accidents became commonplace. An American, Harry Elkes, died of his injuries from a crash in front of 10 000 spectators at Boston, Massachusetts, USA. His rear tire exploded at 100 km/h (62 mph) and he was thrown under another rider's pacing machine, which "crushed the prostrate man in a dreadful manner." George Leander of Chicago said, "Only the clumsy get themselves killed" before starting a race at the Parc des Princes in Paris. Leander was thrown five metres (16 ft) into the air after 80 km (50 mi), fell to the track, bounced into the seating and died 36 hours later. A crash in Berlin on 18 July 1909 killed nine when a motorcycle careened into the stands and exploded.

The historian Peter Nye wrote:

Motorpace racing was glamorous but dangerous. Falls were common, largely because bicycle tires tended to burst at speed. The riders wore neither helmets nor gloves. They depended on fast reflexes, the rude health of youth, and luck. Despite having all three, Bobby Walthour collected an impressive (or dismaying) inventory of injuries over his career: 28 fractures of the right collarbone, 18 of the left, 32 broken ribs, and 60 stitches to his face and head. Once, according to family history, he was given up for dead in Paris and taken to a morgue, where he regained consciousness on the slab.

The biggest machines were built by the pacers, using parts from other motorcycles, with engines as large as 2,400 cc (150 cu in). The largest had two riders, one crouched over the handlebars to steer and the other sitting upright above the back wheel to protect the rider and to operate the engine. The pacers wore leathers, goggles and helmets but many riders wore a flat cap.

The world governing body, the Union Cycliste Internationale, set regulations for pacing motorcycles in 1920. Until then standards had been set by the police, particularly in Germany, or by the track promoters.

World championships were held annually, except during wars, for 100 years, often separately for amateurs and professionals. Carsten Podlesch, who won in 1994, is the last and reigning world champion. National championships continue in several European countries and European championships are conducted annually.

Motorcycles now used include the 750 cc (46 cu in) Triumph Tiger or BMW machines. The motorcycle for motor-pacing has a roller on a frame at the rear to create a uniform distance to the cyclist. Some riders objected when the UCI insisted on them in 1920. The pacer stands or sits upright to offer a maximum windbreak, and the handlebars are extended to facilitate the stance, in a standardized leather suit that allows for the same slipstream effect for any rider. Speeds of 100 km/h (62 mph) can be reached; the average is 60–70 km/h (37–43 mph).

The bicycles are steel, sturdy and have a smaller front wheel to let the stayer bend forward into the slipstream.

== Pacing by Derny ==
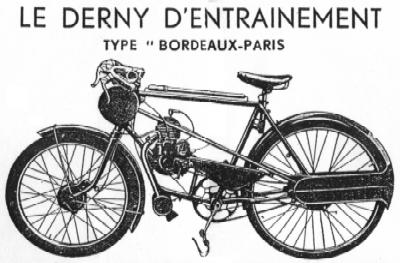
Derny publicity material

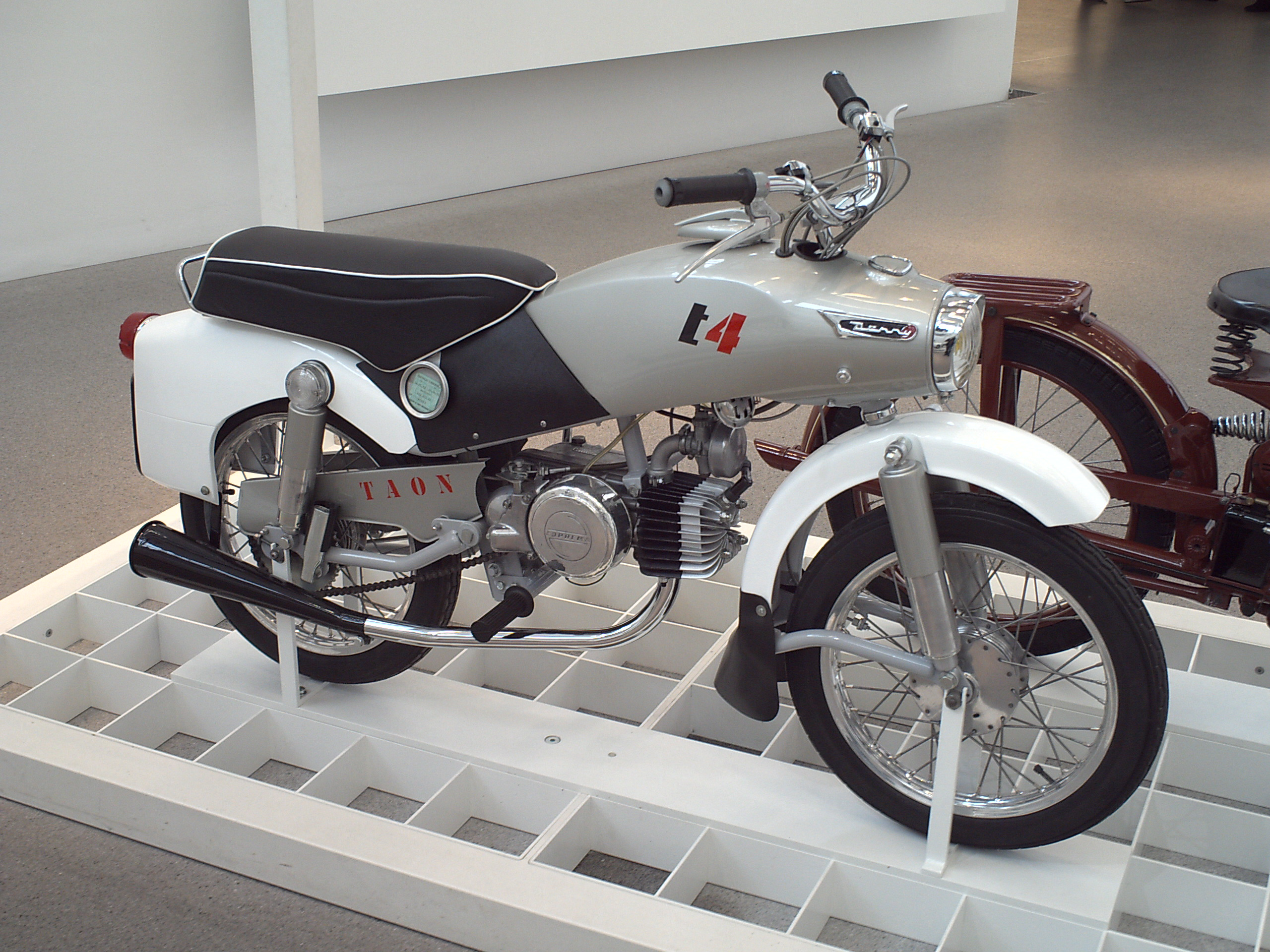
Derny Taon 125, 1955/1956

A Derny is a light motorbike typically driven by a 98 cc (6.0 cu in) Zurcher two-stroke engine and by being pedaled through a fixed gear, typically of 70 teeth on the front chainring and 11 on the sprocket on the back wheel. The combination allows for smooth acceleration and slowing, important when the rider taking pace is centimetres from the pacer's shielded back wheel. A coupling between the motor and the back wheel ensures the machine will not stop dead if the motor seizes.

The first Entraineur or Bordeaux–Paris models, with a petrol tank across the handlebars, were built by Roger Derny et Fils of the avenue de St Mandé, Paris, France in 1938. That closed in 1957, though another company, Derny Service of rue de Picpus serviced and rebuilt machines into the 1970s. Derny also built a street adaptation called the Solo as well as tandems and mopeds.

The name derny is now applied to all such vehicles, regardless of manufacturer. It is used by the Larousse dictionary as a generic term for a small pacing motorcycle used in cycle races. The machine has to be bump-started. It can then pace riders up to 90 km/h (56 mph), although races rarely exceed 80 km/h (50 mph). Riders behind Derny-pacers ride conventional track bicycles.

Bordeaux–Paris was paced by Dernys for part of its route from 1946 to 1985.

== Pacers ==
Cooperation between pacer and stayer includes the use of terms and signals understood internationally, because pacers and stayers may be of different nationalities. The stayer needs to be close to the roller to gain maximum profit from the slipstream; if they get too close they may hit the roller and fall, if they fall too far behind it, they lose the slipstream effect and will quickly fall further back. The pacer then has to slow down so they can catch up and then accelerate without again losing their rider.

== Races ==
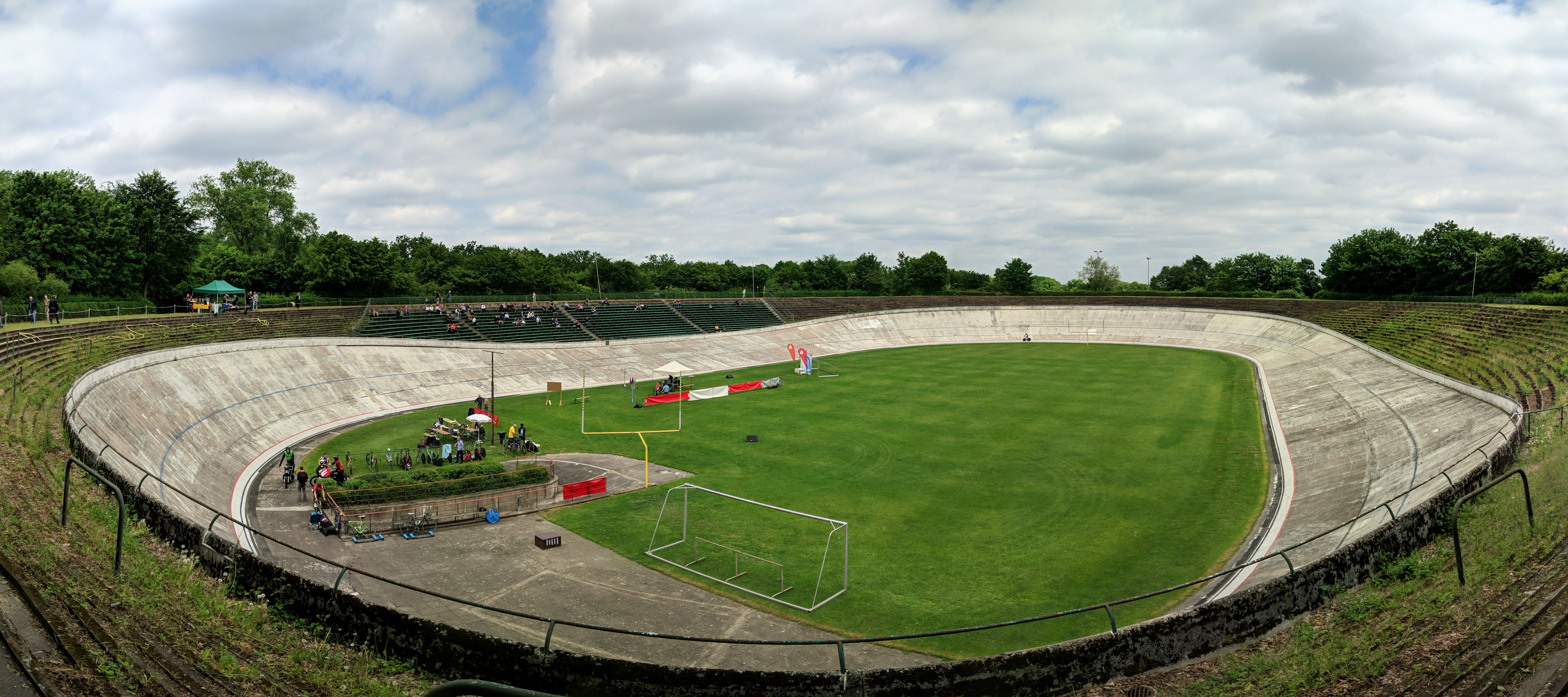
Radrennbahn Bielefeld (2019)

Races are in velodromes or on other oval and steeply banked tracks to allow high-speed racing. After a flying start the cyclists link up with their pacers. Riding counterclockwise, passing can only be done on the right, a blue line separating the longer passing lane from the inner. Typically four to six couples compete in a race, covering up to 100 kilometres (62 mi) or racing over a set time.

=== Keirin ===
The keirin, a Japanese sprint with a paced start which has spread across the world, is a variation of motor-paced racing. A group of cyclists use a single pacer to get to speed and then sprint to the finish on their own.

== Records ==
The first registered distance record behind pacers was by Frederick Lindley Dodds of Britain, who on a solid-tired bicycle rode close to 16 miles (26 km) in the grounds of Cambridge University in 1876 during a 20-mile scratch race. A south London rider, J. W. Stocks, set an unbeaten British record of 32 miles 1,086 yards (52.492 km) in an hour behind pacers on 27 September 1897.

From 1893 to 1895, Hélène Dutrieu set several women's paced hour records, ending with 39.190 km at Vélodrome Roubaisien. In 1896, Amélie Le Gall set a new women's paced hour record of 43.461 at Vélodrome Buffalo.

The first hour record behind a motorcycle was set at 34 miles (55 km) by Harry Elkes of the USA in 1898. He rode behind a motor-powered tandem. The first record behind a pure motorcycle was 68 km (42 mi) by Tom Linton of Britain at the Parc des Princes track in northwest Paris in 1902. The speed increased but records become more hazy because some were made under restrictions imposed by the Union Cycliste Internationale and others with no rules at all.

On 12 October 1950, Karl-Heinz Kramer set the world record for absolute speed behind a motorcycle with 154.506 km/h (96.006 mph) on the Grenzlandring.

Frenchman José Meiffret, set a record 204.73 km/h (127.21 mph) behind a Mercedes-Benz 300 SL on an Autobahn at Freiburg, Germany, on 16 July 1962. His bicycle had a 130-tooth chainring and wooden rims. Fred Rompelberg, using a dragster with a large shield as pacer, achieved 268.831 km/h (167.044 mph) on the Bonneville Salt Flats on 15 October 1995.

The British absolute speed record is held by Neil Campbell, pedaling at a speed of 183.75 km/h (114.18 mph) on 25 April 2016 behind a modified Volkswagen Passat. He broke the previous record of 181.76 km/h (112.94 mph) set by Guy Martin in 2013 behind a modified racing truck.

Denise Mueller-Korenek claimed a women's bicycle land speed record at 147 mph (237 km/h) at the Bonneville Salt Flats on 12 September 2016. Mueller was coached by former record holder John Howard. It is not clear which authority was supervising the record attempt. On 16 September 2018, again at Bonneville, she took the world record with a top speed of 183.93 mph (296 km/h) behind a converted rail dragster with a fairing.

== See also ==
- UCI Motor-paced World Championships
- British National Derny Championships
- French National Stayers Championships
