= French National Stayers Championships =

The French National Stayers Championships are held annually. The stayers event is often known as motor-paced. It is held on a cycling track, the riders follow a motor throughout the race, the rider of the motor is known as their pacer. The event is relatively long for track racing and requires a (steep and wide) track that is suited for these high-speed events, and therefore is held separate from the French National Track Championships. The championship is an open event, in that riders of other nationalities also compete for the French title. All those listed below where nationality is not denoted, are French.

== Results ==
Year	Gold	Silver	Bronze
1885	Jules Dubois	Henri Pagis	Xavier Cruat
1886	Frédéric de Civry	Jules Dubois	Charles Terront
1887	Frédéric de Civry	Charles Terront	Jules Dubois
1888	Charles Terront	Louis Cottereau	Paul Medinger
1889	Charles Terront	Michel Hermet	Henri Beconnais
1890	Henri Beconnais	Dominique De Mello	Jules Dubois
1891	Fernand Charron	Henri Fournier	Henri Beconnais
1892	Henri Farman	Jules Dubois	(Switzerland) Charles Piquet
1893	Lucien Louvet	Henri Fournier	André Fossier
1894	Constant Huret	Edmond Jacquelin	Jacques Dubois (Soibad)
1895	Lucien Lesna	Pierre Lartigue	Gustave Siolliac (alias Caillois)
1896	Alphonse Baugé	Edmond Williams	Edouard-Henry Taylor
1897	Émile Bouhours	Paul Bourotte	Denis Digeon
1898	Émile Bouhours	Alphonse Baugé	Denis Digeon
1899	Edouard-Henry Taylor	Émile Bouhours	Alphonse Baugé
1900	Émile Bouhours	Alphonse Baugé	Édouard Léonard
1901	Paul Bourotte	Charles Jué	Eugenio Bruni
1902	Émile Bouhours	Henri Contenet	Henri Cornet
1903	Henri Contenet	Paul Dangla	Charles Albert Brécy
1904	Albert Champion	Paul Guignard	Henri Contenet
1905	Paul Guignard	Marcel Lecuyer	César Simar
1906	Louis Darragon	Antoine Dussot	Émile Bouhours
1907	Louis Darragon	Antoine Dussot	Maurice Bardonneau
1908	Georges Parent	Paul Guignard	Henri Contenet
1909	Georges Parent	Louis Darragon	Ellena
1910	Georges Parent	Louis Darragon	Maurice Bardonneau
1911	Louis Darragon	Émile Bouhours	Daniel Lavalade
1912	Paul Guignard	Louis Darragon	Daniel Lavalade
1913	Paul Guignard	Daniel Lavalade	Georges Parent
1914	Paul Guignard	Georges Parent	Achille Germain
1919	Georges Seres Sr.	Laurre	
1920	Georges Seres Sr.	Leon Didier	Henri Fossier
1921	Leon Didier	Marcel Godivier	Henri Fossier
1922	Georges Seres Sr.	Gustave Ganay	Marcel Godmer
1923	Georges Seres Sr.	Léon Parisot	Jules Miquel
1924	Robert 'Toto' Grassin	Gustave Ganay	Georges Seres Sr.
1925	Georges Seres Sr.	Ali Neffatti	Marcel Godivier
1926	Gustave Ganay	André Jubi	Ernest Catudal
1927	Jean Brunier	Léon Parisot	Georges Paillard
1928	Georges Paillard	Léon Parisot	Henri Breau
1929	Georges Paillard	Léon Parisot	
1930	Georges Paillard	Charles Lacquehay	François Urago
1931	Georges Paillard	Charles Lacquehay	Robert 'Toto' Grassin
1932	Georges Paillard	Charles Lacquehay	François Urago
1933	Charles Lacquehay		
1934	Georges Paillard	Georges Wambst	Charles Lacquehay
1935	Georges Wambst	Charles Lacquehay	Georges Paillard
1936	André Raynaud	Georges Wambst	Ernest Terreau
1937	Ernest Terreau	Georges Wambst	Charles Lacquehay
1938	Henri Lemoine	Georges Paillard	Charles Lacquehay
1939	Louis Minardi	Georges Wambst	Emile Sausin
1940	Georges Wambst	Raoul Lesueur	Robert Oubron
1941	Ernest Terreau	Henri Lemoine	Louis Minardi
1942	Henri Lemoine	Raoul Lesueur	Louis Chaillot
1943	Ernest Terreau	Raoul Lesueur	Louis Minardi
1944	Louis Chaillot	Louis Minardi	Raoul Lesueur
1945	Henri Lemoine	Louis Chaillot	Gabriel Claverie
1946	Louis Chaillot	Raoul Lesueur	Henri Lemoine
1947	Jean-Jacques Lamboley	Louis Chaillot	Raoul Lesueur
1948	Jean-Jacques Lamboley	Gabriel Claverie	Paul Chocque
1949	Raoul Lesueur	Jean-Jacques Lamboley	Guy Bethery
1952	Henri Lemoine	Raoul Lesueur	Gabriel Claverie
1953	Henri Lemoine	Roger Queugnet	Guy Solente
1954	Roger Queugnet	Roger Rioland	Guy Solente
1955	Roger Godeau	Roger Rioland	Guy Bethery
1956	Roger Godeau	Ange Le Strat	Henri Lemoine
1957	Roger Godeau	Bernard Bouvard	André Boher
1958	Bernard Bouvard	Roger Godeau	Georges Lavalade
1959	Bernard Bouvard	Roger Godeau	Jean Raynal
1960	Roger Godeau	Jean Raynal	André Retrain
1961	Jean Raynal	Robert Varnajo	Michel Scob
1962	Robert Varnajo	Jean Raynal	André Retrain
1963	Robert Varnajo	Roger Hassenforder	André Retrain
1964	Robert Varnajo	Michel Scob	Antège Godelle
1965	Jean Raynal	Robert Varnajo	Michel Scob
1966	Jean Raynal	Daniel Salmon	Robert Giscos
1967	Jean Raynal	Daniel Salmon	Antège Godelle
1968	Jean Raynal	Daniel Salmon	Antège Godelle
1969	Michel Scob	Jean Raynal	Daniel Salmon
1970	Michel Scob		
1973	Alain van Lancker	Christian Palka	Christian Raymond
1974	Alain Dupontreue	Enzo Mattioda	Bernard Masson
1975	Enzo Mattioda	Alain Dupontreue	Patrick Cluzaud
1976	Alain Dupontreue	Enzo Mattioda	Alain van Lancker
1977	Alain Dupontreue	Mariano Martínez	Marcel Boishardy
1978	Alain Dupontreue	Gilles Blanchardon	Dominique Thiébaud
1979	Dominique Thiébaud	Pierre Trentin	Jean-Claude Rude
1980	Pierre Trentin	Dominique Thiebaud	Jean-Luc Blanchardon
1981	Franck Clemente	Pierre Trentin	Dominique Thiebaud
1982	Jean-Claude Lecourieux	Pierre Trentin	Dominique Thiebaud
1983	Jean-Claude Lecourieux	Dominique Thiebaud	Joël Palmace
1984	Bruno Garnier	Pierre Trentin	Dominique Thiebaud
1985	Frédéric Vichot	Éric Guyot	Yvon Bertin
1986	Jacques Decrion	Thierry Barrault	Gerard Simonnot
1987	Patrick Gouin	François Jurain	Jean-François Pouzet
1988	Philippe Tarantini	Jean-François Pouzet	Alain Parisot
1989	Serge Crottier-Combe	Gerard Simonnot	Alain Parisot
1990	Pascal Chollet	Christian Pierron	Eric Giletto
1991	Michel Dubreuil	Serge Crottier-Combe	Jean-Louis Nicolas
1992	Serge Crottier-Combe	Christian Pierron	Marc Duval
1993	Serge Crottier-Combe	Hervé Dagorne	(Belgium) Marc Seynaeve
1994	(Belgium) Marc Seynaeve	Michel Dubreuil	Frederic Thomas
1997	(Belgium) Marc Seynaeve	Serge Crottier-Combe	Nicolas Fournier
1999	Anthony Gillot	(Belgium) Marc Seynaeve	Olivier Ouvrard
2000	Anthony Gillot	(Belgium) Marc Seynaeve	Serge Crottier-Combe
2001	(Belgium) Marc Seynaeve	Anthony Gillot	Stéphane Benetiere
2002	Stéphane Benetiere	Samuel Dumoulin	(Belgium) Marc Seynaeve
2003	Samuel Dumoulin	Stéphane Benetiere	Steven Dupouy
2004	Stéphane Benetiere	Anthony Gillot	Mickaël Buffaz
2005	Samuel Dumoulin	David Derepas	Benoît Daeninck
2006	David Derepas	François Lamiraud	Benoît Daeninck
2007	David Derepas	Mickaël Buffaz	Emilien Clere
2008	Mickaël Buffaz	David Derepas	Antoine Gorichon
2009	David Derepas	Antoine Gorichon	Emilien Clere
2010	David Derepas	François Lamiraud	Antoine Gorichon
2011	Benoît Daeninck	David Derepas	Emilien Clere
2012	Benoît Daeninck	David Derepas	Antoine Gorichon
2013	Benoît Daeninck	Emilien Clere	David Derepas
2014	Emilien Clere	Alexandre Paccalet	Antoine Gaudillat
2015	Antoine Gaudillat	Christopher Gamez	Kevin Fouache
