= Critérium des As =

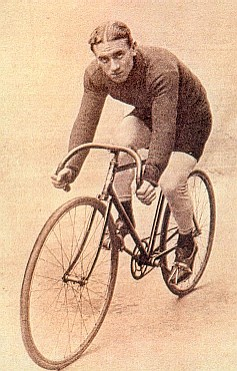

Race details
- English name: Race of the Aces
- Discipline: Road

History
- First edition: 1921
- Editions: 61
- Final edition: 1990
- First winner: (Belgium) Philippe Thys
- Most wins: (Belgium) Rik Van Steenbergen (5 wins)
- Final winner: (France) Gilbert Duclos-Lassalle

The Critérium des As (Race of the Aces) was a cycle race that was generally held at the end of the season, with entry by invitation only, for the leading riders of the season. Competitors rode behind pacers on tandems or motorcycles. It was held from 1921 until 1990, mostly in Paris, France but also in Switzerland and Holland. The last Critérium des As was held in 1990 and was replaced by the Roue d'Or des As the following year.

== History ==
In 1920 the Critérium de la résistance was run from Bordeaux to Paris (Longchamp) and back to Bordeaux, and is regarded as the forerunner of Critérium des As. The 1,208 kilometres (751 mi) paced event was won by Louis Mottiat of Belgium, in 56 hours and 48 minutes.

In 1921 the best riders of the season were invited to enter the Critérium des As, 27 laps of a 3.63 km circuit around Longchamp. They rode alone except for pacers who helped on occasional laps, not being fast enough to last longer.

Crowds of up to 6,000 watched in the years before the World War II. The individual pacers were replaced by tandems, triplets, motorcycles and finally specialist Derny lightweight motorcycles in 1947. René de Latour, a journalist who organised the race in 1943, when the inside of the circuit included flak guns to defend the Renault factory in Boulogne-Billancourt, said:

The tandems gave more shelter and the race became more and more spectacular. Each of the selected riders had four or five tandems at his disposal, and it was a lovely sight to see the relieving tandem taking over from the 'double' that had just completed its allotted spell. If you talk to the older bike fans, they will tell you regretfully that racing was really beautiful to watch in the days of tandem-pacing and that nothing had ever really replaced them. I must say that I think that way, too." René de Latour

The most prolific winner was Rik Van Steenbergen of Belgium, with five wins.

== Winners ==
Year	Location	Winner	Second	Third
1921	Longchamp	(Belgium) Philippe Thys	(Belgium) René Vermandel	(France) Henri Pélissier
1922	Longchamp	(Belgium) René Vermandel	(France) Jean Alavoine	(France) Romain Bellenger
1923	Longchamp	(Belgium) Jules Van Hevel	(France) Romain Bellenger	(France) Maurice Brocco
1924	Longchamp	(Belgium) Jules Van Hevel	(Switzerland) Heiri Suter	(France) Henri Pélissier
1925	Longchamp	(France) Achille Souchard	(Belgium) Hector Martin	(France) Romain Bellenger
1926	Longchamp	(France) Henri Pélissier	(France) Gabriel Marcillac	(France) Charles Lacquehay
1927	Longchamp	(France) Gabriel Marcillac	(France) Henri Pélissier	(Belgium) Hector Martin
1928	Longchamp	(France) Charles Lacquehay	(Belgium) Gérard Debaets	(France) Lucien Choury
1929	Longchamp	(France) Georges Wambst	(France) Armand Blanchonnet	(France) Charles Lacquehay
1930	Longchamp	(France) Camille Foucaux	(France) Henri Lemoine	(France) André Mouton
1931	Longchamp	(France) Jean Maréchal	(France) Henri Lemoine	(France) Georges Wambst
1932	Longchamp	(France) Ernest Terreau	(France) Georges Wambst	(France) Jean Maréchal
1933	Longchamp	(France) Charles Pélissier	(Belgium) Romain Gijssels	(France) Ernest Terreau
1934	Longchamp	(France) André Leducq	(France) Charles Pélissier	(France) Julien Moineau
1935	Longchamp	(France) Ernest Terreau	(Belgium) Edgard De Caluwé	(Belgium) Romain Gijssels
1936	Longchamp	(France) Ernest Terreau	(France) René Debenne	(France) Maurice Richard
1937	Longchamp	(France) Georges Paillard	(France) Paul Chocque	(France) Victor Cosson
1938	Longchamp	(Netherlands) Gerrit Schulte	(France) René Debenne	(Italy) Cesare Moretti Jr.
1939-1942	No race			
1943	Longchamp	(France) Raoul Lesueur	(Belgium) Joseph Somers	(Belgium) Maurice Clautier
1944-1946	No race			
1947	Longchamp	(France) Émile Carrara	(France) Émile Idée	(France) Lucien Teisseire
1948	Longchamp	(Belgium) Rik Van Steenbergen	(France) Apo Lazaridès	(France) Louis Caput
1949	Longchamp	(France) Louison Bobet	(Italy) Fausto Coppi	(Netherlands) Wim van Est
1950	Longchamp	(France) Louison Bobet	(Belgium) Stan Ockers	(France) Robert Varnajo
1951	Longchamp	(Switzerland) Hugo Koblet	(Belgium) Rik Van Steenbergen	(France) Louison Bobet
1952	Longchamp	(Belgium) Rik Van Steenbergen	(France) Louison Bobet	(France) André Darrigade
1953	Longchamp	(France) Louison Bobet	(Belgium) Stan Ockers	(Switzerland) Ferdi Kübler
1954	Longchamp	(France) Louison Bobet	(France) Jacques Anquetil	(Switzerland) Ferdi Kübler
1955	Longchamp	(Belgium) Rik Van Steenbergen	(Spain) Miguel Poblet	(Belgium) Stan Ockers
1956	Longchamp	(France) Bernard Gauthier	(Belgium) Rik Van Steenbergen	(France) Roger Rivière
1957	Longchamp	(Belgium) Rik Van Steenbergen	(France) André Darrigade	(France) Louison Bobet
1958	Longchamp	(Belgium) Rik Van Steenbergen	(France) André Darrigade	(France) Raphaël Géminiani
1959	Longchamp	(France) Jacques Anquetil	(Belgium) Rik Van Steenbergen	(France) Jean Bobet
1960	Longchamp	(France) Jacques Anquetil	(France) André Darrigade	(Belgium) Rik Van Looy
1961	Longchamp	(Belgium) Rik Van Looy	(Belgium) Rik Van Steenbergen	(France) André Darrigade
1962	Longchamp	(Germany) Rudi Altig	(Belgium) Rik Van Steenbergen	(France) André Darrigade
1963	Longchamp	(France) Jacques Anquetil	(United Kingdom) Tom Simpson	(Belgium) Rik Van Looy
1964	Longchamp	(Netherlands) Peter Post	(Belgium) Edward Sels	(France) Jacques Anquetil
1965	Longchamp	(France) Jacques Anquetil	(Netherlands) Jan Janssen	(Germany) Rudi Altig
1966	Longchamp	(Netherlands) Gerben Karstens	(Italy) Felice Gimondi	(France) Raymond Poulidor
1967	Lac Daumesnil	(Belgium) Eddy Merckx	(France) Jacques Anquetil	(Italy) Felice Gimondi
1968	Le Havre	(Italy) Felice Gimondi	(France) Raymond Poulidor	(Denmark) Ole Ritter
1969	Le Havre	(Belgium) Walter Godefroot	(France) Raymond Delisle	(Belgium) Julien Stevens
1970	Lac Daumesnil	(Belgium) Eddy Merckx	(Belgium) Herman Van Springel	(France) Lucien Aimar
1971	No race			
1972	Felletin	(France) Raymond Poulidor	(France) Bernard Thévenet	(Belgium) Walter Godefroot
1973	Tilburg, NL	(Netherlands) Gerben Karstens	(Italy) Felice Gimondi	(Belgium) Eddy Merckx
1974	Nogaro	(Belgium) Eddy Merckx	(Belgium) Freddy Maertens	(Netherlands) Gerben Karstens
1975	Belfort	(Belgium) Roger De Vlaeminck	(Belgium) Herman Van Springel	(Belgium) Freddy Maertens
1976	Valkenburg, NL	(Belgium) Freddy Maertens	(Belgium) Eddy Merckx	(Netherlands) Gerben Karstens
1977	Châteaulin	(Italy) Francesco Moser	(Belgium) Herman Van Springel	(Belgium) Ronald De Witte
1978	Orchies	(France) Michel Laurent	(Netherlands) Jan Raas	(Belgium) Herman Van Springel
1979	La Défense	(Netherlands) Joop Zoetemelk	(Belgium) Daniel Willems	(France) Bernard Hinault
1980	La Défense	(Netherlands) Joop Zoetemelk	(Belgium) Herman Van Springel	(France) Patrick Hosotte
1981	La Défense	(Belgium) Daniel Willems	(Belgium) Herman Van Springel	(Republic of Ireland) Stephen Roche
1982	La Défense	(France) Bernard Hinault	(Republic of Ireland) Sean Kelly	(France) Alain Bondue
1983	Genève, Sui	(United States) Greg LeMond	(France) Pascal Poisson	(Republic of Ireland) Sean Kelly
1984	Montreuil-sous-Bois	(Republic of Ireland) Sean Kelly	(Belgium) Jean-Luc Vandenbroucke	(Belgium) Claude Criquielion
1985	Montreuil-sous-Bois	(Republic of Ireland) Sean Kelly	(Belgium) Eric Vanderaerden	(Belgium) Claude Criquielion
1986	Montreuil-sous-Bois	(Republic of Ireland) Sean Kelly	(Netherlands) Adrie van der Poel	(Portugal) Acácio da Silva
1987	Montreuil-sous-Bois	(France) Charly Mottet	(Belgium) Eric Vanderaerden	(Republic of Ireland) Sean Kelly
1988	Montreuil-sous-Bois	(Belgium) Claude Criquielion	(Republic of Ireland) Sean Kelly	(France) Pascal Poisson
1989	Port Leucate	(France) Laurent Fignon	(Republic of Ireland) Sean Kelly	(France) Éric Caritoux
1990	Lac Daumesnil	(France) Gilbert Duclos-Lassalle	(France) Charly Mottet	(France) Laurent Fignon
