= Frédéric de Civry =

French cyclist

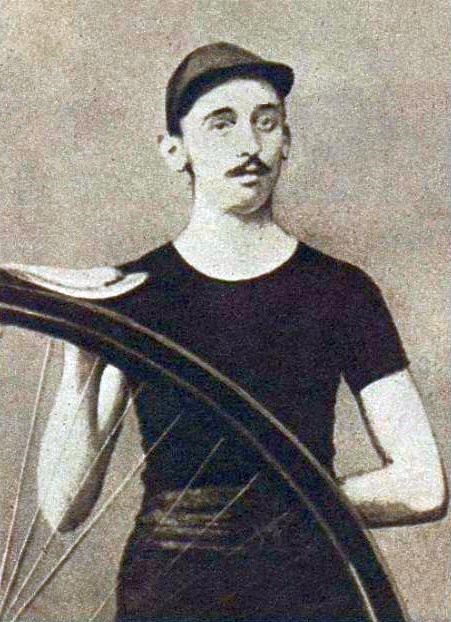

Personal information
- Full name: Frédéric de Civry
- Born: 21 August 1861 Paris, France
- Died: 15 March 1893 (aged 31) Courbevoie, France

Cycling career
- Sport: Cycling
- Discipline: Track
- Role: Rider
- Rider type: Sprinter

Major wins
- French National Sprint Champion, 1881; French National Sprint Champion, 1882; 50 miles British/World Champion, 1883; French National Stayer Champion, 1886; French National Stayer Champion, 1887

Frédéric de Civry (21 August 1861 – 15 March 1893) was a French track cyclist who generally competed over 20 to 50 miles. He rode most frequently in professional races in England, but was considered an amateur rider in his native France. He was the French national sprint champion in 1881 and 1882, and the national stayer champion in 1886 and 1887. In 1883, he won the 50-mile Championships in Leicester, which were reported in some newspapers as deciding the champion of the world.

== Life and career ==
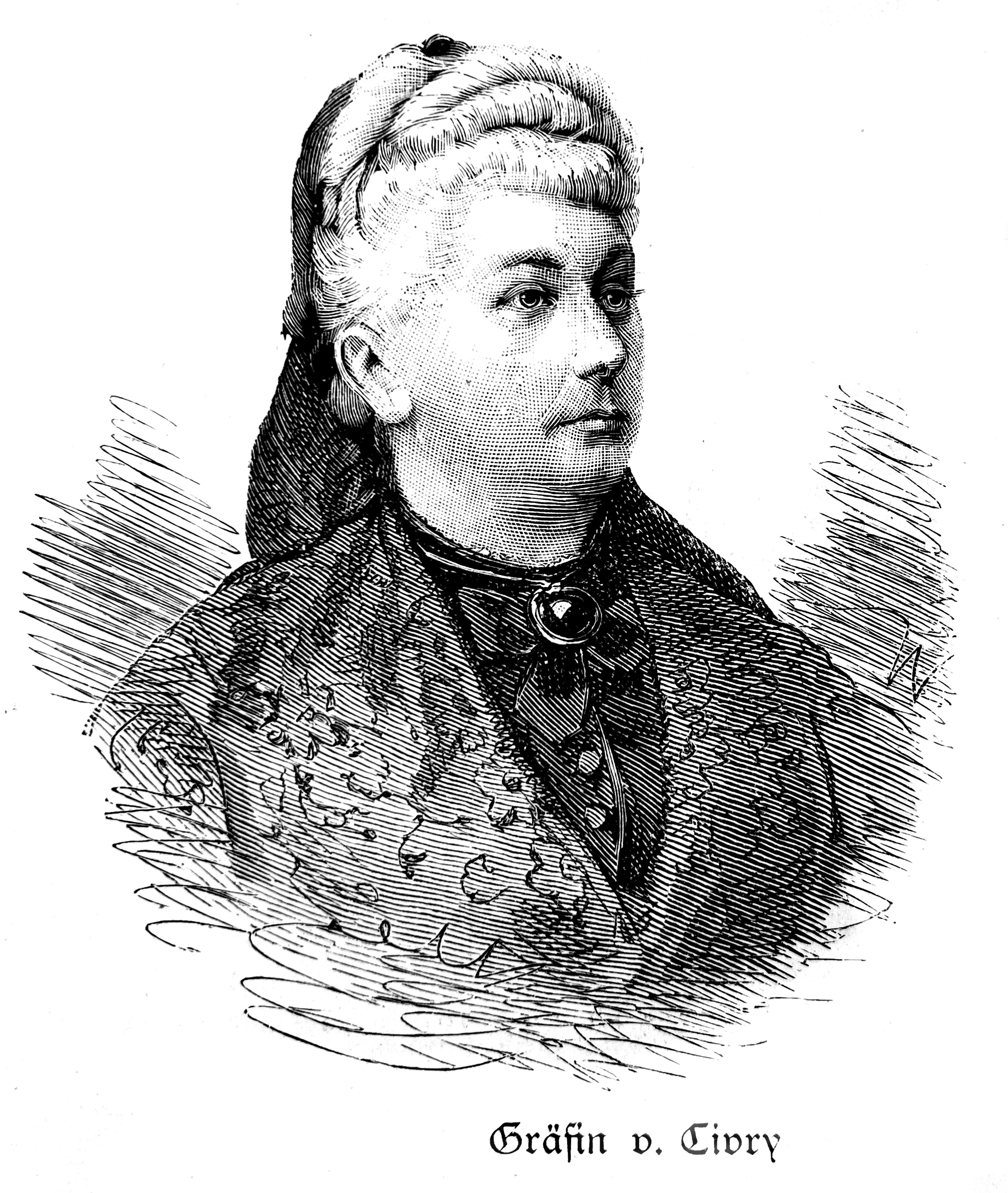
Civry´s mother Elisabeth. (1890)

Marie Othon Robert Fréderic Auguste Du Collin De Barizien De Civry was born in Paris on 21 August 1861 into a French noble family; his mother Elisabeth Wilhelmine von Colmar was a natural daughter of Charles II, Duke of Brunswick and Lady Charlotte Colville. Civry´s father was Pierre Antoine Eugène du Collin, comte de Civry the son of Pierre du Collin, chevalier de Barizien, comte de Civry and his second wife Marie-Marguerite-Sophie Bertaud de La Tramerie.

A year after the couples marriage,the comte de Civry was forced to sell all of his estates, compounded in 1860 by Civry´s father and uncle facing criminal allegations of abuse of a blank cheque. They were first found guilty and sentenced to several months in prison, before finally being acquitted on appeal after being defended by the noted lawyer Charles Lachaud.

Civry´s mother tried to claim her rights as the daughter of the Duke of Brunswick-Wolfenbuttel and sued her father for a pension and alimony. This claim was however rejected and the duke won the case in 1865. These circumstances left the Civry family in an impoverished state. In order to support the family, Civry´s mother took up writing, founding a literary journal "The salon Belge" as well as authoring several books.

Civry received his education in England, and spent much of his cycling career in that country. He was generally considered to be an amateur cyclist in France, and frequently competed in that category, but Hugh Dauncey, in French Cycling: A Social and Cultural History, suggested that he was financially dependent upon the sport, and was considered a professional by the English press. He competed in the 1881 Grand Prix of Angers, finishing as the overall champion, and the sprint champion. In the same year, he became the French National Sprint Champion and was second overall at the Blois road race.

In late 1881, he competed twice against the English champion, John Keen. In the first race at The Crystal Palace, de Civry was given a one-minute head start, and won when Keen retired halfway through. The second was a scratch 20-mile race at the same venue. Keen again retired, after 11 miles, and De Civry completed the race in 1 hour 4:21, beating the professional record by just over five seconds.

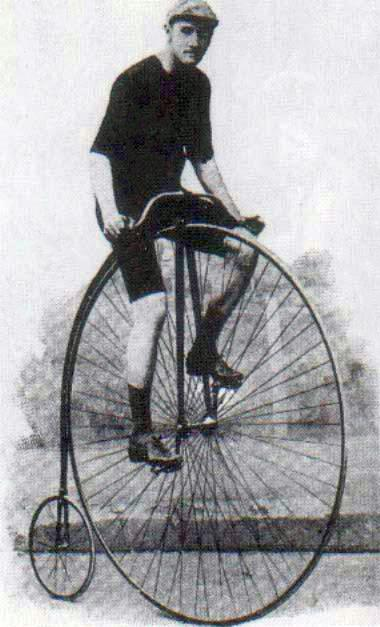
Frédéric de Civry

De Civry repeated his successes in Angers and at the French national championships in 1882, and later that year, he competed in a 25-mile race in Leicester, dubbed the "championship of the world" in the English press. Twenty miles into the race, de Civry tried to break away from the other riders and establish a lead, but failed, and retired with three laps of the race to go; R Howell of Wolverhampton won the race. The following year on 24 March 1883, de Civry competed in a 50-mile race, once again in Leicester, variously entitled the "Championship of England", or the "Fifty Miles Professional Bicycle Championship of the world". Ten miles into the race, de Civry opened a lead of half a lap, and continued to increase it throughout the race. He won, completing the distance in 3 hours, 13:40, over three minutes ahead of the next competitor. The following Monday, he took part in the 10-mile race, but retired shortly before reaching half distance. The 50-mile championship was held again in August of the same year, in which de Civry lost his title to F. Wood of Leicester. In April the following year, de Civry competed for the 50-mile championship once again, but was involved in a collision with Wood, which took them both out of the race. He also took part in the one and ten mile championships, but did not win either.

During 1885, de Civry won the Grand Prix of Angers once again, and finished second in the French national sprint championships. He competed without success in the championships in England. In each of 1886 and 1887, he was the French National Stayer Champion. Two years later, he was arrested in France in relation to gambling debts incurred in Monaco and Paris. During his cycling career, he won 211 of his 331 races.

== Later life ==
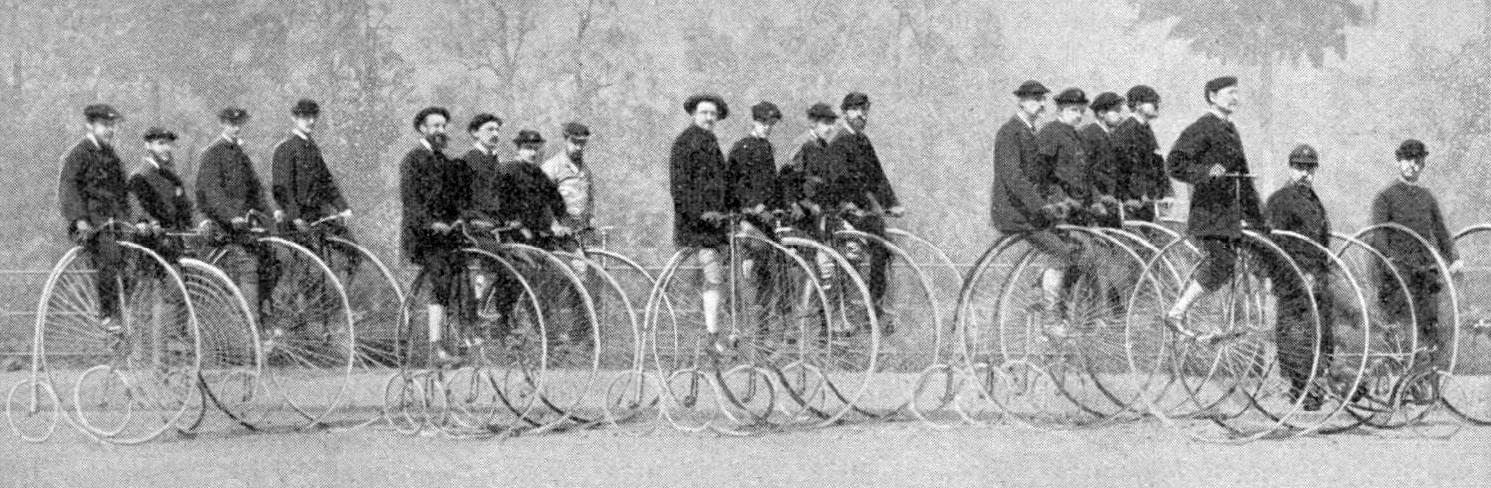
Members of the Paris Metropolitan Cycling Society ride out on penny-farthings in May 1882 (President de Civry and Vice-President Clément-Bayard at the head, on foot

Due to his worsening health, Civry retired from competing in races in 1887. For the first three years after his retirement Civry was employed at the British bicycle manufacturers Rudge & Co store location in Paris. Civry acted as the manager for bicyclist racer Joseph Jiel-Laval who was sponsored by Rudge.

Later Civry began working for the bicyle manufacturer Clément Cycles for whom he did promotional work. Civry also sat on the board of directors for the Vélodrome de la Seine, which was to be constructed at the grounds of the Clement bicycle factory and was the driving force behind the project.

Towards the end of his life Civry was employed by the Dunlop Pneumatic Tire Company.

== Death ==
Civry died on 15 March 1893 from tuberculosis, aged 32 at Asnières.

== See also ==
- Charles Terront
