= Lamboley =

Lamboley is a French surname that may refer to

- Grégory Lamboley (born 1982), French rugby union footballer
- Jean-Jacques Lamboley (1920–1999), French motor-paced cyclist
- Mathieu Lamboley (born 1980), French film composer
- Paul E. Lamboley, radioman at South Pole Station
  - Lamboley Peak in Antarctica named after Paul
- Soline Lamboley (born 1996), French cyclist, granddaughter of Jean-Jacques
