= Religious buildings in Paris =

The city of Paris, France is home to a large number of religious buildings, of many different religions.

Religion in Paris (2011)
1. Catholicism (61.0%)
2. Irreligion (25.0%)
3. Islam (7.00%)
4. Protestantism (4.00%)
5. Judaism (1.00%)
6. Other religion (2.00%)

== Christianity ==
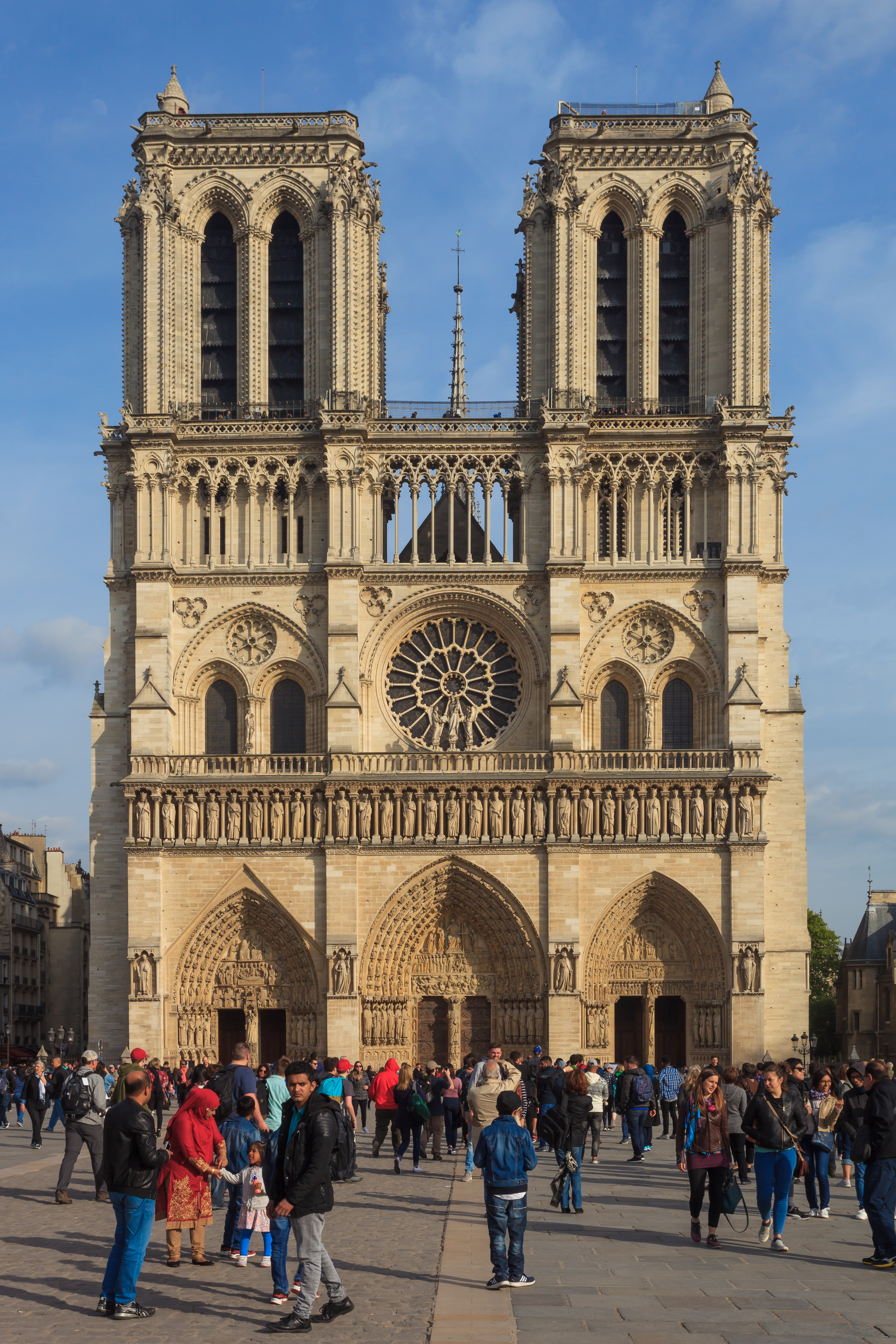
The Cathedral of Notre-Dame de Paris is the seat of the Archdiocese of Paris.

Like the rest of France, Paris has been predominantly Catholic since the early Middle Ages, though religious attendance is now low. A majority of Parisians are still nominally Catholic. According to 2011 statistics, there are 106 parishes and curates in the city, plus separate parishes for Spanish, Polish, and Portuguese Catholics. There are an additional 10 Eastern Orthodox parishes, and bishops for the Armenian and Ukrainian Orthodox Churches. In addition, there are 80 male religious orders and 140 female religious orders in the city, as well as 110 Catholic schools with 75,000 students.

The principal Catholic church in Paris is the Cathedral of Notre-Dame de Paris, the seat of the Archbishop of Paris. There are two officially recognised pilgrimage sites in Paris: the Basilique du Sacré-Cœur de Montmartre and the Chapel of Our Lady of the Miraculous Medal. Laurent Ulrich became Archbishop of Paris in 2022.

Almost all Protestant denominations are represented in Paris, with 74 evangelical churches from various denominations, including 21 parishes of the United Protestant Church of France and three stakes and a temple of the Church of Jesus Christ of Latter-day Saints. There are several important churches for the English-speaking community: the American Church in Paris, founded in 1814, was the first American church outside the United States; the current church was finished in 1931. The Saint George's Anglican Church in the 16th arrondissement is the principal Anglican church in the city.

== Islam ==
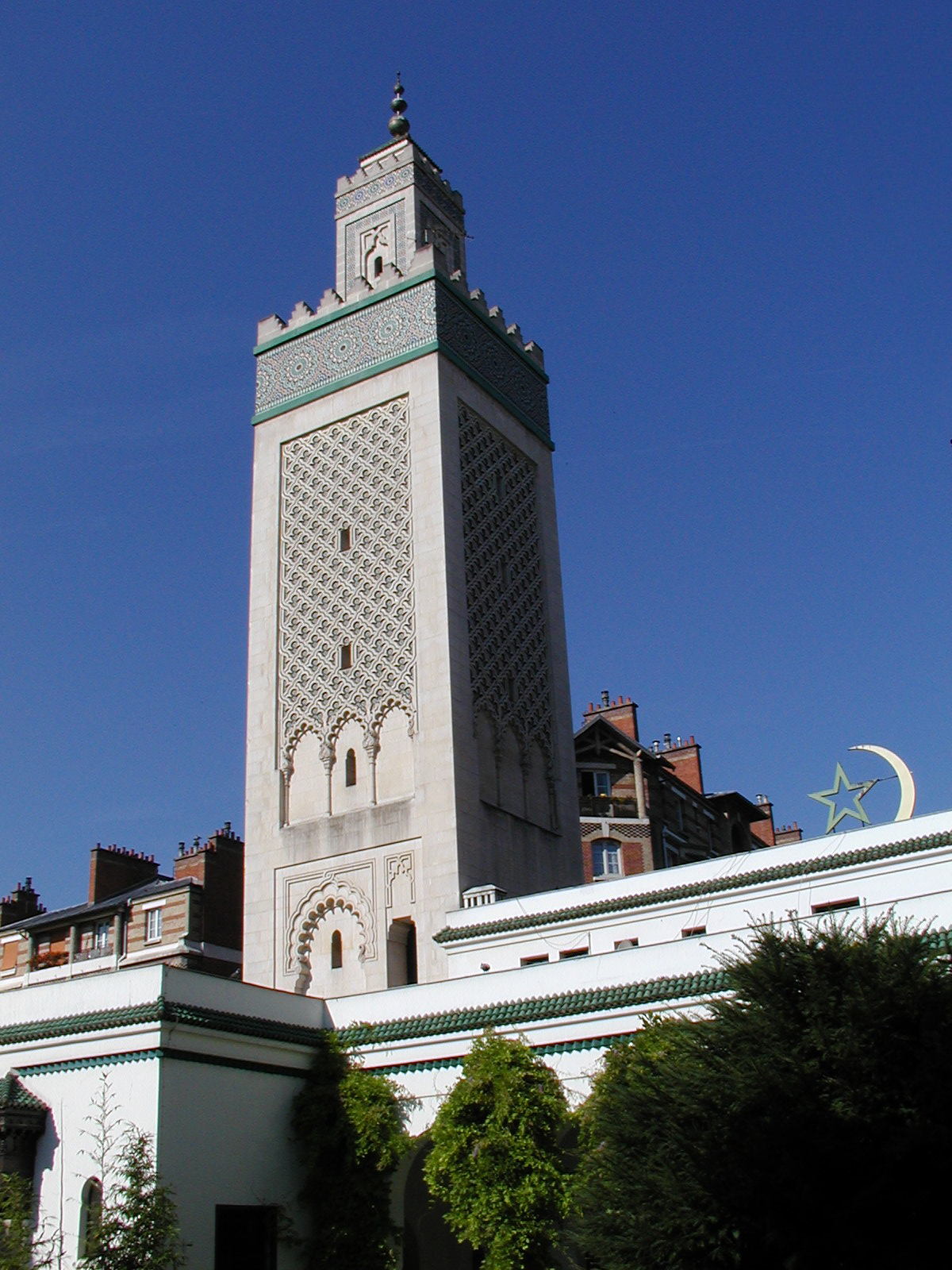
The Grand Mosque of Paris (1926) is the oldest mosque in France.

The Grand Mosque of Paris, the oldest mosque in Paris, was dedicated in 1926. It was funded by the French government and built to honour the 38,000 soldiers from Algeria, Tunisia and Morocco who died fighting for France in the First World War. Designed in the Hispano-Moresque style, it features a 33-meter minaret, tiled courtyards, and horseshoe arches inspired by Andalusian and Maghrebi architecture.

As of 2025, Paris had approximately 75 mosques and prayer areas and numerous smaller prayer rooms, though exact counts vary due to the inclusion of non-purpose-built facilities. The number of mosques doubled between 1991 and 2011, reflecting the growing Muslim population.

== Judaism ==
During the Middle Ages, Paris was a centre of Jewish learning with famous Talmudic scholars, such as Yechiel of Paris who took part in the Disputation of Paris between Christian and Jewish intellectuals. The Parisian Jewish community was victim of persecution, alternating expulsions and returns, until France became the first country in Europe to emancipate its Jewish population during the French Revolution. Although 75% of the Jewish population in France survived the Holocaust during World War II, half the city's Jewish population perished in Nazi concentration camps, while some others fled abroad. A large migration of North Africa Sephardic Jews settled Paris in the 1960s, and represent most of the Paris Jewish community today. There are currently 83 synagogues in the city. The Marais-quarter Agoudas Hakehilos Synagogue, built in 1913 by architect Hector Guimard, is a Paris landmark.

== Buddhism and Hinduism ==
The Pagode de Vincennes Buddhist temple, near Lake Daumesnil in the Bois de Vincennes, is the former Cameroon pavilion from the 1931 Paris Colonial Exposition. It hosts several different schools of Buddhism, and does not have a single leader. It shelters the biggest Buddha statue in Europe, more than nine metres (30 feet) high. There are two other small temples located in the Asian community in the 13th arrondissement. A Hindu temple, dedicated to Ganesh, on Rue Pajol in the 18th arrondissement, opened in 1985.

== See also ==
- Religion in France
