= Gustave Ganay =

French cyclist

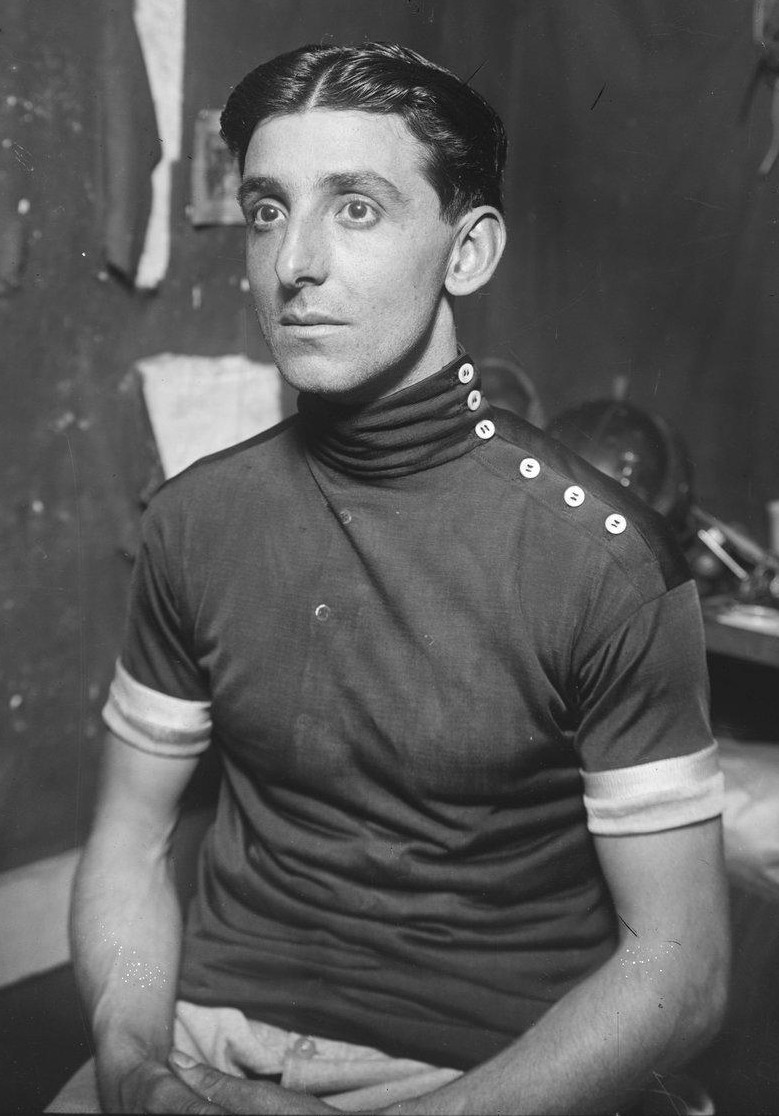

Personal information
- Born: 28 March 1892
- Died: 23 August 1926 (aged 34)

Cycling career
- Sport: Cycling
- Role: Rider

Gustave Ganay (28 March 1892 – 23 August 1926) was a French racing cyclist. He rode in the 1920 Tour de France.

An electrician by trade, Gustave Ganay achieved his first successes in 1910 and 1911 at the Grand Prix de Manosque. He had to interrupt his cycling career between 1914, when he was called up to serve in the artillery during the First World War. In 1919, he returned to success during the Marseille-Lyon race. He finished third in the professional middle-distance world championship in 1922. He finished won the silver medal in the 1926 UCI Track Cycling World Championships one month before his death, and had won the French middle-distance championship earlier in the year.

Ganay was fatally injured during a race at the Parc des Princes in Paris on 22 August 1926 and he died the next day at the height of his fame. The crash occurred at the exit of the bend after the finish line, at the same spot where George Leander and Charles Albert Brécy had lost their lives in separate races in 1904. His front tire burst and he hit his head on the concrete of the track. He died the following morning at the Vaugirard clinic. He is buried in the Saint-Pierre cemetery in Marseille . The city of Marseille honored him by naming a boulevard and a stand at the Vélodrome stadium after him.

The accident was immortalized by Ernest Hemingway in his autobiographical account, A Moveable Feast.
