= Jean-Claude Lecourieux =

French road racing cyclist

Personal information
- Born: 1956 New Caledonia, France
- Died: 7 December 2023 (aged 66–67)

Cycling career
- Sport: Cycling
- Discipline: Road racing
- Role: Rider

Jean-Claude Lecourieux (1956 – 7 December 2023), nicknamed "Blanc-Blanc", was a French road racing cyclist. He won the French National Stayers Championships in 1982 and 1983.

Lecourieux died on 7 December 2023.
