= Ernest Terreau =

French cyclist (1908–1983)

Personal information
- Born: 31 May 1908 Auxy, Saône-et-Loire
- Died: 19 February 1983 (aged 74) 14th arrondissement of Paris

Cycling career
- Sport: Cycling

Amateur team
- 1932: Rivoli Sportif

Professional teams
- 1931: Individual
- 1932–1936: Génial Lucifer–Hutchinson
- 1937–1938: Individual
- 1939: Mercier–Hutchinson
- 1940–1943: Individual

Ernest Terreau (31 May 1908 – 19 February 1983) was a French cyclist. A specialist in motor-paced racing, he was champion of France in this discipline in 1937, 1941 and 1943 and second in the world at the 1937 UCI Track Cycling World Championships.

He was born in Auxy, Saône-et-Loire and died in the 14th arrondissement of Paris.

== Road titles ==
- 1932
  - Circuit de Saône-et-Loire
  - Critérium des As
  - 2nd in the Criterium du Midi
- 1933
  - 3rd in the Critérium des As
- 1934
  - Bordeaux-Saintes
  - 3rd in the Circuit de l'Indre
- 1935
  - Critérium des As
- 1936
  - Critérium des As

== Track titles ==
=== World Championships ===
- 1937 UCI Track Cycling World Championships
  - Silver medal at stayers

=== French Championships ===
- 1936
  - 2nd in Stayers
- 1937
  - (France) French National Stayers Champion
- 1941
  - (France) French National Stayers Champion
- 1943
  - (France) French National Stayers Champion

=== Grand Prix ===
- Grand Prix of the UVF in motor-paced racing : 1938
- Grand Prix d'Auteuil : 1943
