= Alphonse Baugé =

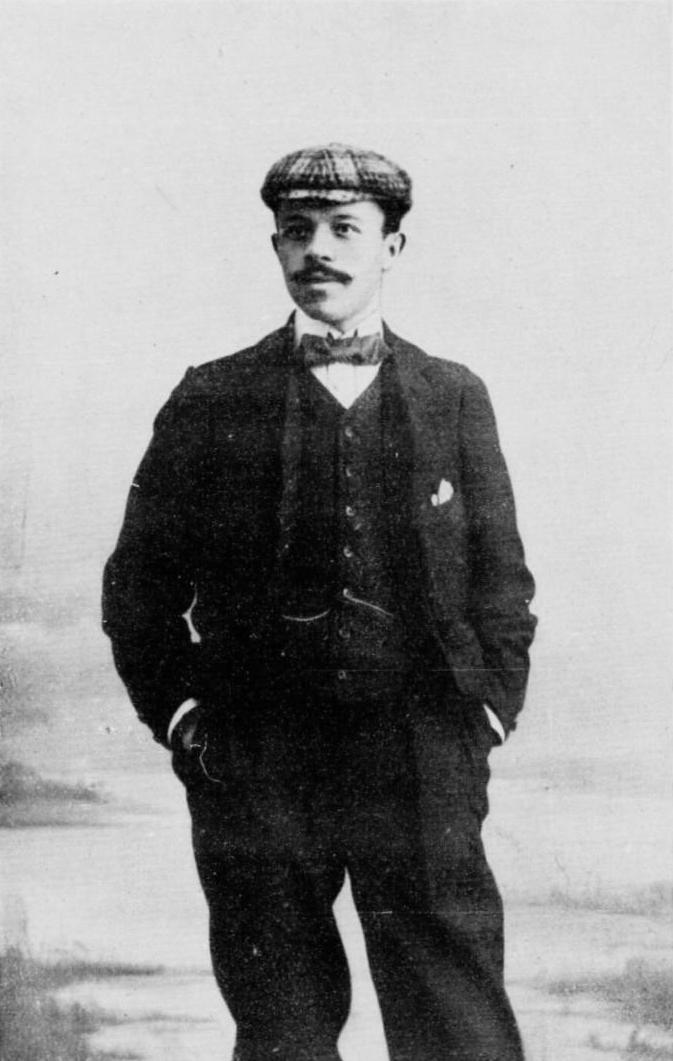

Alphonse Joseph Alexis Baugé (2 August 1873 in Tours – 23 October 1938 in Paris) was a French cyclist and cycling team manager.

== Biography ==
A great bicycle enthusiast, he began his cycling career by winning the French Amateur Stayer Championships in Paris in 1896. In the same year he won a match against Richard Palmer at the Vélodrome d'Hiver. In June 1897 he lost a match against John William Stocks at the Crystal Palace in London. In 1898 he came second at the French Championship and third in 1899 and 1900. In 1903 he covered the Tour de France as a journalist for Le Vélo.

For the 1912 and 1914 Tours de France, as the sports director of the Peugeot team, he was the manager of François Faber, winner of the 1909 Tour de France.

In 1921, he directed the La Sportive cycling team. Nicknamed "le Maréchal", he imposed his conditions on the riders and made them sign two-year contracts.

Baugé died in Paris on 23 October 1938 at the age of 65.

== Championships ==
=== European Championships ===
- 1896 European Stayer Champion

=== French Championships ===
- French Stayer Champion in 1896 (2nd in 1898 and 1900, 3rd in 1896 and 1899)

== Works ==
- Le Tour de France, 1907: Lettres à Mon Directeur. Librairie de L'Auto, Paris 1908, 123 pp. (online version)
- Le secret de "Choppy": mėthode d'entraînement. Librairie de L'Auto, Paris 1908.
- Messieurs les coureurs, 1925
