= Clément Cycles =

French bicycle manufacturer

Clément Cycles, Clement & Cie
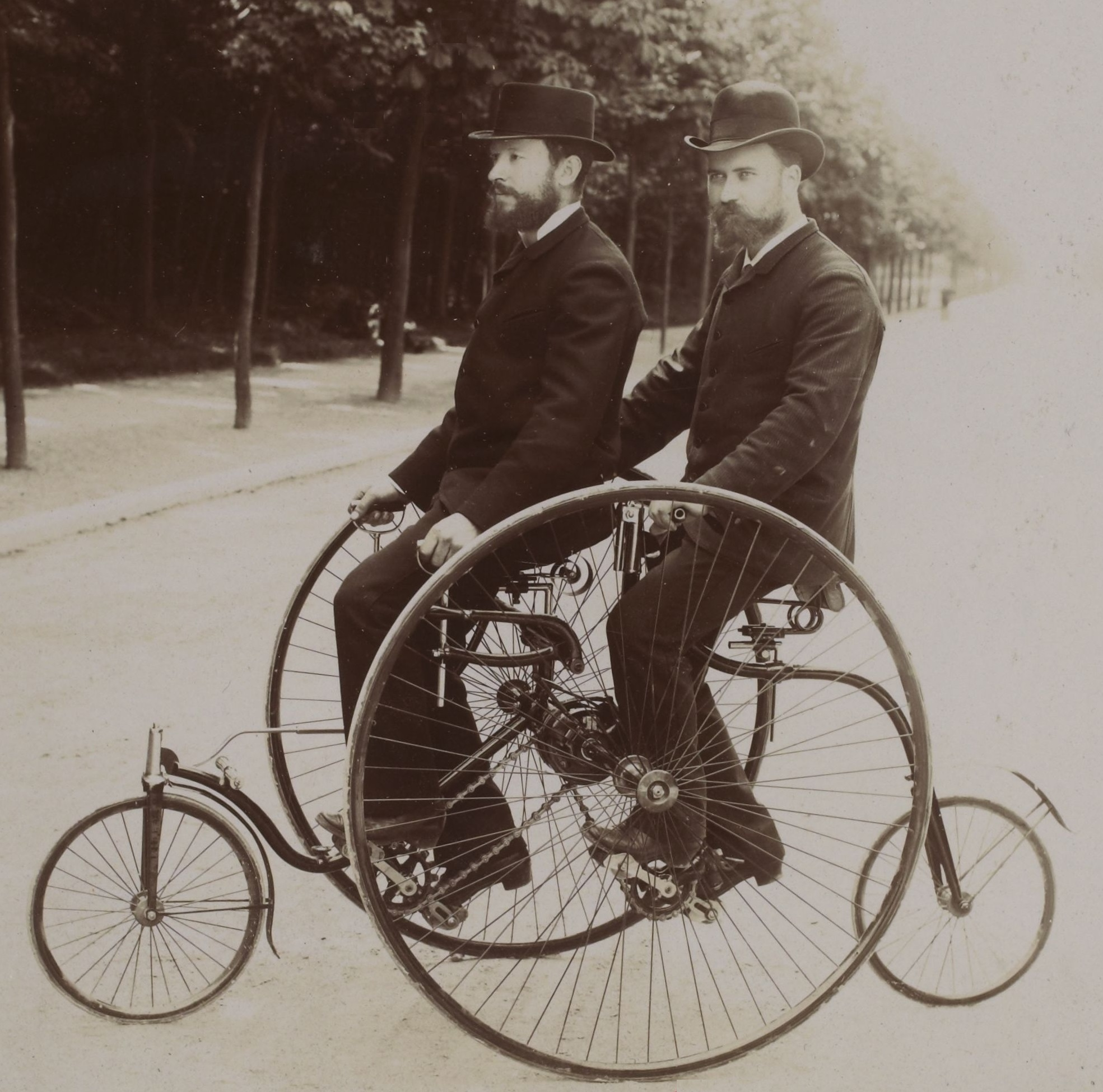

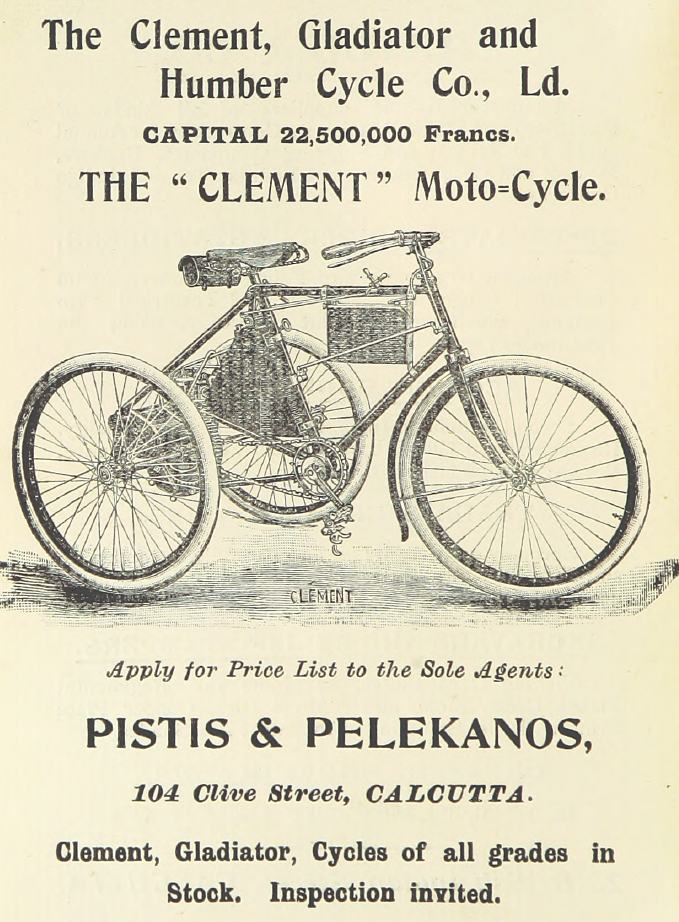
- Advertisement (1898)
- Industry: Bicycle manufacturing
- Founded: 1876
- Founder: Adolphe Clément
- Fate: Defunct
- Headquarters: Levallois-Perret, Paris

Clément Cycles, La Société des Vélocipédes Clément, Clément & Cie was a French bicycle manufacturer that was founded by the industrial entrepreneur Adolphe Clément (known from 1909 as Clément-Bayard). From its beginnings as a bicycle repair shop in Bordeaux, through its establishment as a bicycle shop and workshop in Paris to its mass manufacture of a wide range of bicycles from the purpose built, state of the art factory at Levallois-Perret, Paris, the brand always combined advertising and marketing flair with quality products.

== History ==
In 1876, after 2 years of cycle racing, working and saving, Clément-Bayard had enough money to start in business, so he opened a bicycle repair works in Bordeaux, aged 21. The next stage of his business plan was to move to Marseille where he learned how to manufacture steel tubes for bicycles. The following year he moved to Lyon and began manufacturing whole bicycles under the name 'Clément SA cycles'.

=== Clément cycles ===
The following year, circa 1878, he moved to Paris and opened a cycle business, A. Clément & Cie, at 20 Rue Brunel near the Place de l'Etoile. Here he also ran a cycling school and was competing in cycle races. In Paris his business backers were monsieur de Graffenried and monsieur de Montgeron.

At the end of 1878 Adolphe partnered the cycling champion Charles Terront at the 'Six-Days' cycling event at the Agricultural Hall in London. He also opened a sales showroom at 31 rue 'du 4-September', in Paris and started a poster advertising campaign, a new concept.

In September 1879, Clément built an iron smelter in Tulle, in the Limousin where there was a good supply of water power, but he did not have sufficient finance to make it viable and Tulle was too remote from Paris, so he had to sell the plant.

By 1880 the "Clément" cycle manufacturing business at Rue Brunel, had circa 150 employees building bicycles. The machines were regarded as high quality and by 1890 Clément was the leading cycle brand in France.

=== Clément-Gladiator cycles ===
In 1896 Adolphe Clément who held the extremely profitable manufacturing rights for Dunlop tyres in France joined with a syndicate led by Dunlop's founder Harvey Du Cros to buy out the Gladiator Cycle Company and they merged it into a major bicycle manufacturing conglomerate of Clement, Gladiator & Humber & Co Limited. The range of cycles was expanded with tricycles, quadricycles, and in 1902 a motorised bicycle, then cars and motorcycles.

== Publicity posters ==
Clément & Cie tricycles & bicycles 1890.

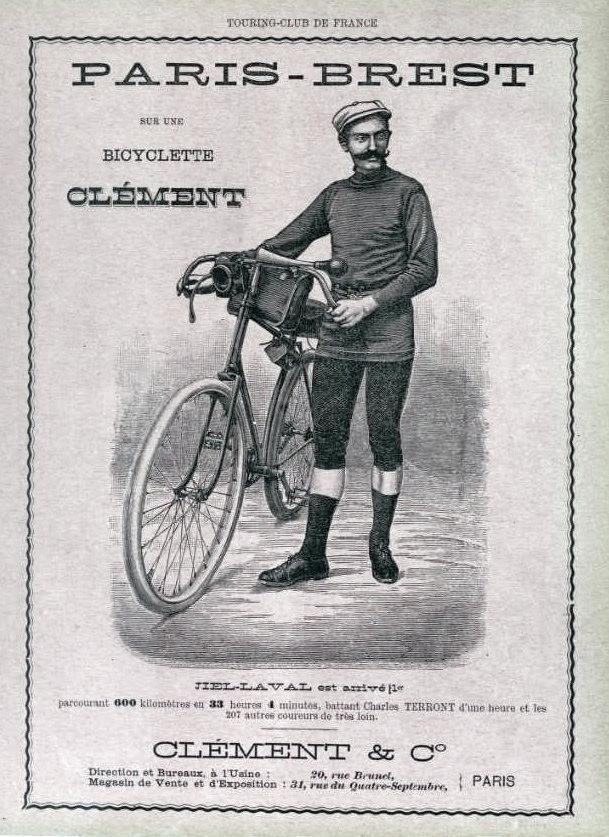
Paris–Brest–Paris, Joseph Jiel-Laval 1891

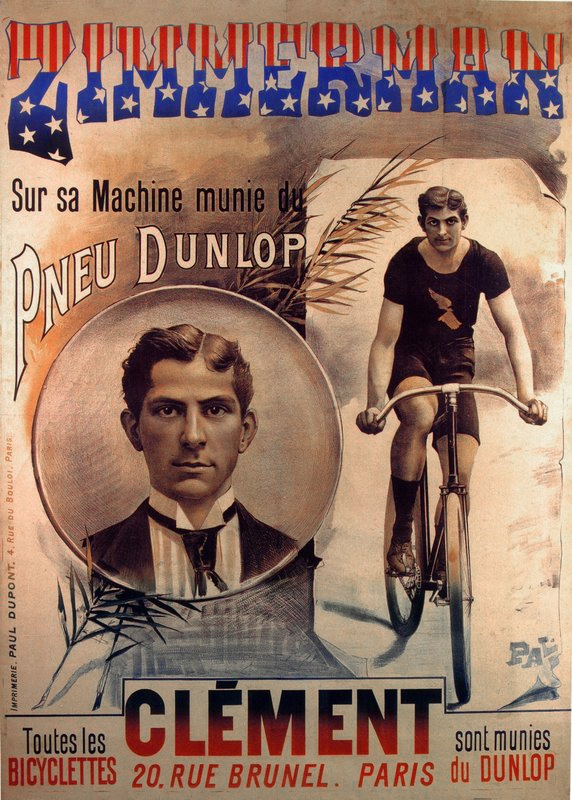
Arthur Augustus Zimmerman using Dunlop tyres. 1894. (By Jean de Paleologu)

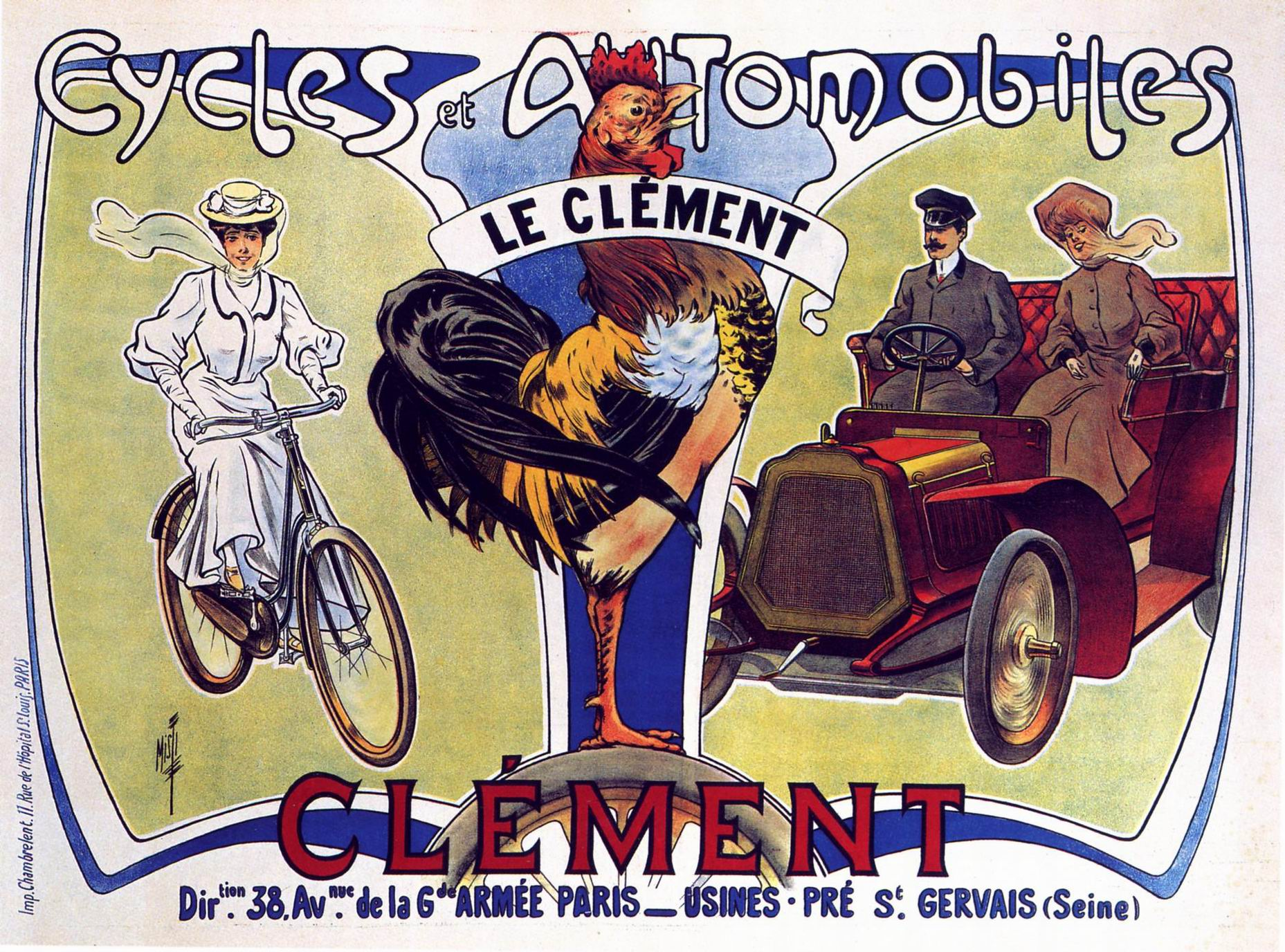
Clément Cycles & Automobiles poster, 1902

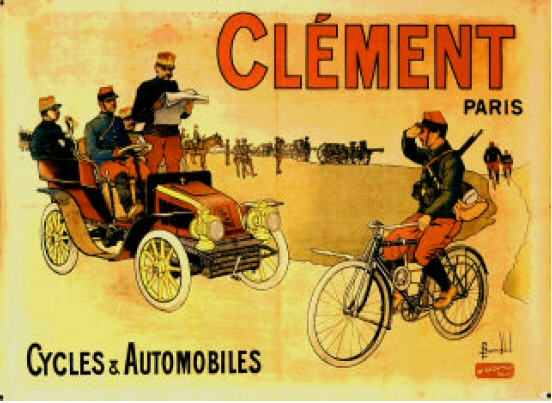
Clément poster, ca. 1903
