= Hour record of France =

Hour record of France is the hour record, longest distance cycled in one hour on a bicycle from a stationary start, held by a French cyclist since 1893. Cyclists attempt this record alone on the track without other competitors present.

Date	Cyclist	Distance (km)	Place
1893-05-11	Henri Desgrange	35.325	Paris
1894-10-31	Jean Dubois	38.220	Paris
1905-08-24	Lucien Petit-Breton	41.110	Paris
1907-06-20	Marcel Berthet	41.520	Paris
1913-07-07	Marcel Berthet	42.741	Paris
1913-09-20	Marcel Berthet	43.775	Paris
1933-08-29	Maurice Richard	44.777	Saint-Trond
1936-10-14	Maurice Richard	45.375	Milan
1937-11-03	Maurice Archambaud	45.817	Milan
1956-06-29	Jacques Anquetil	46.159	Milan
1957-09-18	Roger Rivière	46.923	Milan
1958-09-29	Roger Rivière	47.346	Milan
2015-04-11	François Lamiraud	49.408	Roubaix
2015-09-20	François Lamiraud	50.844	Aguascalientes
