= David Derepas =

French cyclist

Personal information
- Born: 9 March 1978 (age 48) Dijon, France

Cycling career
- Sport: Cycling
- Disciplines: Road, Cyclo-cross, Track
- Role: Rider

Professional teams
- 1997: Team Lapierre
- 2000–2002: Phonak
- 2003–2004: FDJeux.com
- 2005–2006: Jartazi Granville Team
- 2007: Roubaix–Lille Métropole
- 2008: Groupe Gobert.com

David Derepas (born 9 March 1978 in Dijon) is a French cyclist. He started his career as a mountain biker with Team Lapierre, before moving on to compete on the road, track and in cyclo-cross. He also rode in the 2003 and 2004 editions of the Giro d'Italia.

== Major results ==
=== Road ===
1999
3rd Time trial, World Military Road Championships
10th Road race, UCI Road World Under–23 Championships
2000
6th National Road Race Championships

=== Track ===
2005
2nd Stayers, National Track Championships
2006
1st Stayers, National Track Championships
2007
1st Stayers, National Track Championships
2008
2nd Stayers, National Track Championships
2009
1st Stayers, National Track Championships
2010
1st Stayers, National Track Championships
2011
2nd Stayers, National Track Championships
2012
2nd Stayers, National Track Championships
2013
3rd Stayers, National Track Championships

=== Cyclo-cross ===
1995–1996
2nd National Junior Cyclo-cross Championships
5th Junior race, UCI Cyclo-cross World Championships
1996–1997
2nd National Under–23 Cyclo-cross Championships
1997–1998
2nd National Under–23 Cyclo-cross Championships
1998–1999
8th Under–23 race, UCI Cyclo-cross World Championships
1999–2000
1st National Under–23 Cyclo-cross Championships
4th Under–23 race, UCI Cyclo-cross World Championships
2001–2002
2nd National Cyclo-cross Championships
2013–2014
1st World Masters 35–39 Cyclo-cross Championships
2016–2017
1st National Masters 35–39 Cyclo-cross Championships
