= Soline Lamboley =

French cyclist (born 1996)

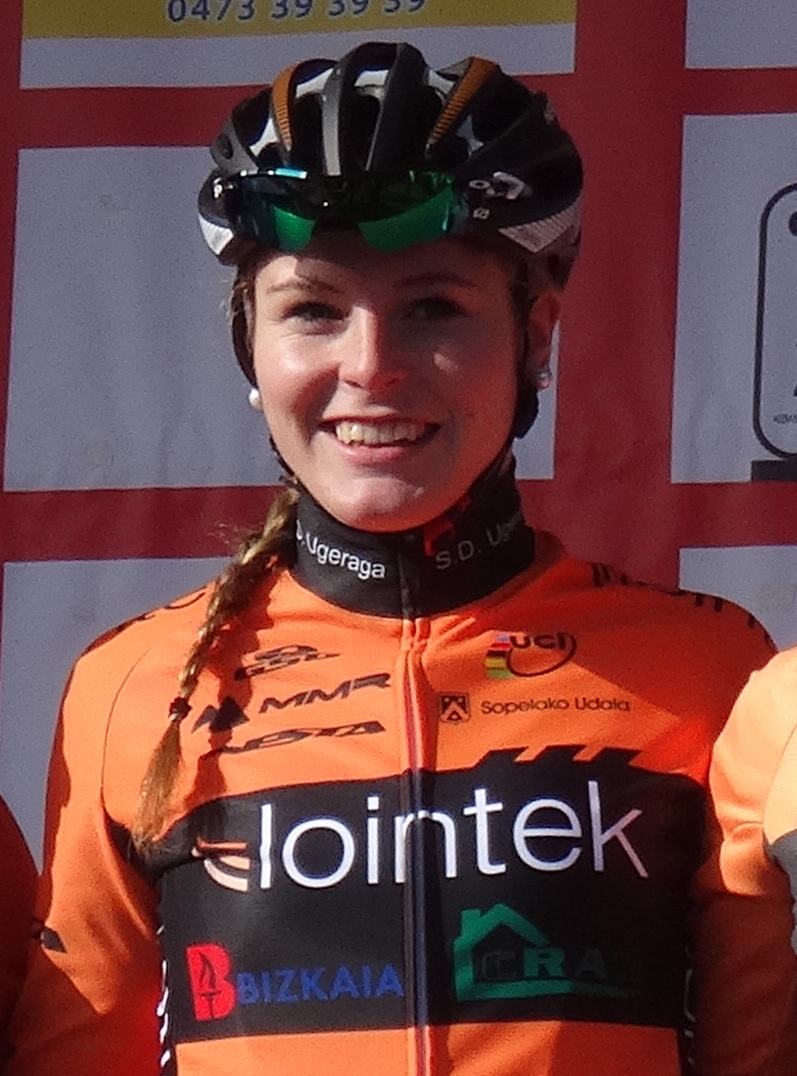
- Lamboley in 2015

Personal information
- Born: 11 October 1996 (age 30) Mélisey, France

Cycling career
- Sport: Cycling
- Disciplines: Road and track
- Role: Rider

Amateur teams
- 2002-2011: Roue d'Or Noidans
- 2012-2014: AC Bisontine
- 2016: AC Bisontine

Professional teams
- 2015: Lointek Team
- 2017: SAS–Macogep

Soline Lamboley (born 11 October 1996) is a French professional racing cyclist. She rode at the 2015 UCI Track Cycling World Championships. She is the granddaughter of Jean-Jacques Lamboley.

== Major results ==
2013
1st Points race, French National Track Championships – Junior
2nd Omnium, UCI Track World Championships - Junior
2nd 500 m, French National Track Championships – Junior
2nd Sprint, French National Track Championships – Junior
3rd Omnium, European Track Championships - Junior
2014
Prova Internacional de Anadia

1st Scratch Race
2nd Omnium

2nd Scratch Race, International Belgian Open
1st National Road Race Championship - Junior
2nd Scratch, UCI Track World Championships - Junior
2nd 500 m, French National Track Championships – Junior
3rd Omnium, UCI Track World Championships - Junior
3rd Omnium, European Track Championships - Junior
3rd Team Pursuit, European Track Championships - Junior
3rd Pursuit, French National Track Championships – Junior
2015
1st Scratch, European Track Championships - U23
2nd Omnium, French National Track Championships
3rd Points race, French National Track Championships
3rd National Road Race Championship - U23
2016
2nd Scratch Race, UEC U23 European Track Championships
3rd French National Road Cup - 4th stage
