= Henri Lemoine (cyclist) =

French cyclist (1909–1991)

Personal information
- Born: 18 June 1909 Massy, Essonne, France
- Died: 21 September 1991 (aged 82) Montrouge, France

Sport
- Sport: Cycling
- Club: Vélo Club de Levallois, Levallois-Perret
Medal record
Representing France
UCI Motor-paced World Championships
Bronze medal – third place	1951 Milan	Professionals
Bronze medal – third place	1952 Paris	Professionals
Bronze medal – third place	1953 Zurich	Professionals

Henri Lemoine (18 June 1909 – 21 September 1991) was a French cyclist. He competed at the 1928 Summer Olympics in the 2000 m tandem sprint and finished in fifth place. He then turned professional and competed up to 1958 in road racing and motor-paced racing. In the latter discipline he won six national titles, in 1938, 1942, 1945, and 1951–53, as well as three bronze medals at the UCI Motor-paced World Championships in 1951–1953. On 23 July 1931 he set a world record in one kilometre from standing start at the Buffalo Stadium (1'10.80).

In road races, he finished second in the Critérium des As in 1930 and 1931, 11th in the 1932 Critérium Internationale, and 20th in the 1933 Grand Prix des Nations.
