= Michel Scob =

French cyclist

Personal information
- Born: Michel Scobeltzine; 26 April 1935 Inchy, France
- Died: 7 September 1995 (aged 60)
- Height: 6 ft 2 in (188 cm)
- Weight: 168 lb (76 kg)

Cycling career
- Sport: Cycling

Michel Scob (né Scobeltzine; (Russian: Скобельцын); 26 April 1935 – 7 September 1995) was a French cyclist. He competed in the 1000m time trial and tandem events at the 1960 Summer Olympics. He was the older brother of French film and theatre actress Édith Scob.
