= Raoul Lesueur =

French cyclist

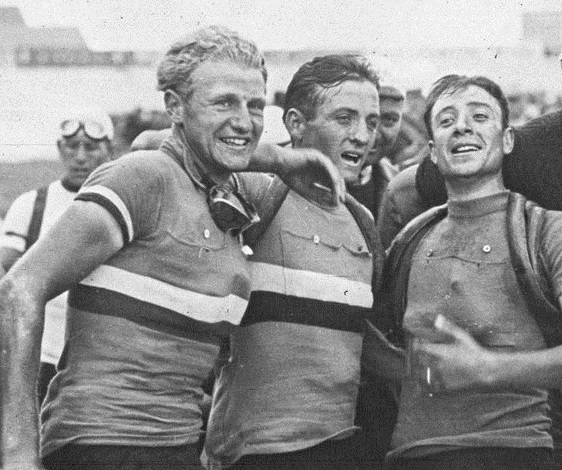
- Raoul Lesueur (left) Paul Maye (center) and the French Sauveur Ducazeaux (right). (1936)

Personal information
- Born: 29 April 1912 Le Havre, France
- Died: 19 August 1981 (aged 69) Vallauris, France

Sport
- Sport: Cycling
Medal record
Representing France
UCI Motor-paced World Championships
Gold medal – first place	1947 Paris	Professionals
Bronze medal – third place	1949 Copenhagen	Professionals
Gold medal – first place	1950 Rocourt	Professionals

Raoul Lesueur (French pronunciation: [ʁaul ləsɥœʁ]; 29 April 1912 – 19 August 1981) was a French cyclist. He started his career as a road racer, winning numerous competitions in the 1930s and Critérium des As in 1943. After World War II he focused on motor-paced racing. In this discipline he won a European title in 1950 and the UCI Motor-paced World Championships in 1947 and 1950.

In the beginning of his cycling career, Lesueur moved from his native Le Havre to Nice and trained at the local "Vélodrome Pasteur". The Velodrome was heavily damaged by bombing in 1944, as it was likely confused with a factory building, and thus demolished in 1960. The former Avenue de Velodrome is now called Rue Raoul Lesueur.
