= François Lamiraud =

French cyclist

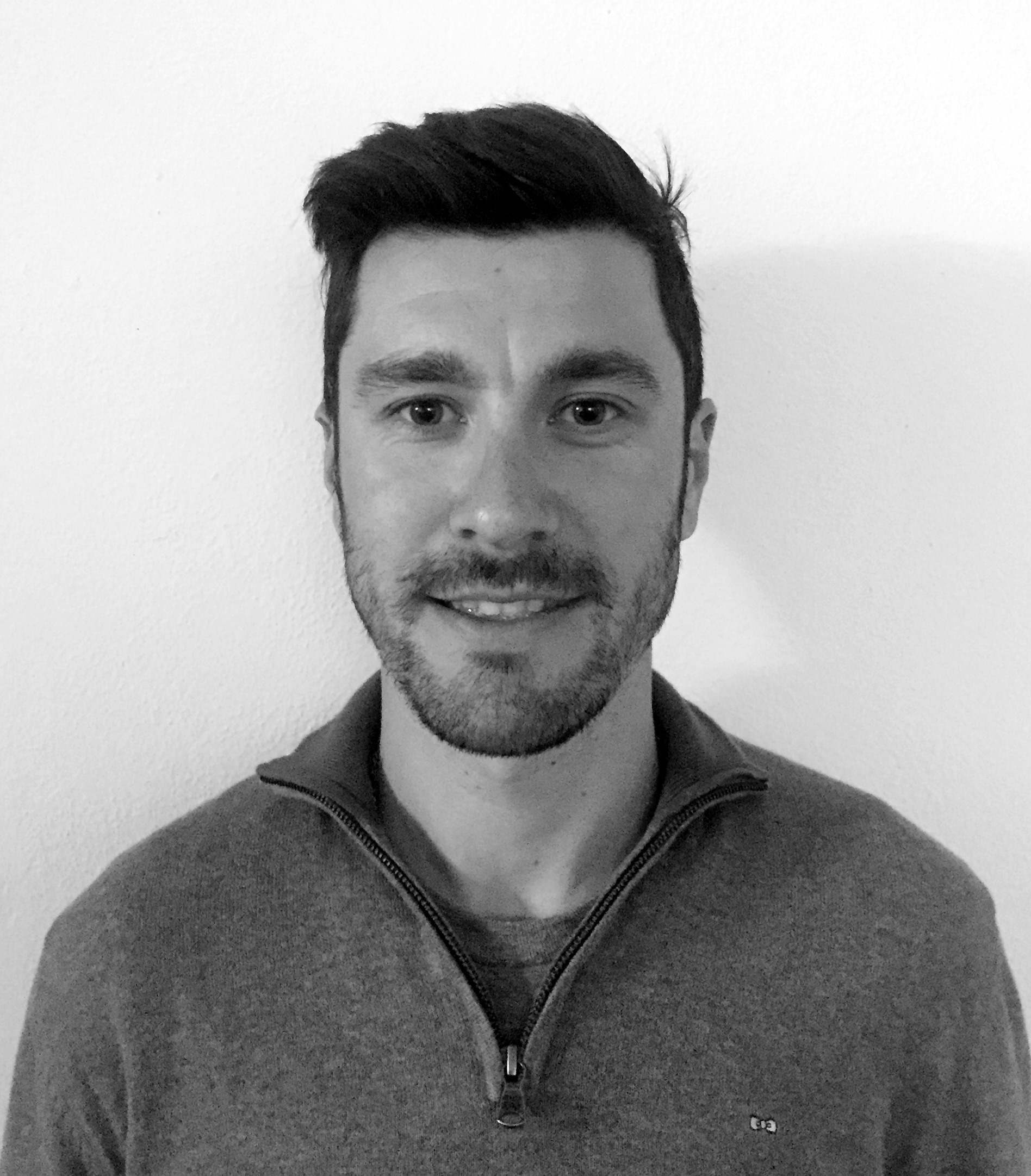
- François Lamiraud (2017)

Personal information
- Full name: François Lamiraud
- Born: 5 April 1983 (age 43) Marseille, France

Cycling career
- Sport: Cycling
- Discipline: Road
- Role: Rider

François Lamiraud (born 5 April 1983) is a French road cyclist.

He is known for beating the hour record of France held by Roger Rivière since 1958 on 11 April 2015.
