= Roger Queugnet =

French cyclist (1923–2020)

Personal information
- Born: 28 May 1923

Cycling career
- Sport: Cycling
- Role: Rider

Roger Queugnet (French: [ʁɔʒe køɲɛ]; 28 May 1923 – 17 November 2020) was a French racing cyclist. He rode in the 1950 Tour de France.
