= Joseph Jiel-Laval =

French cyclist (1855–1917)

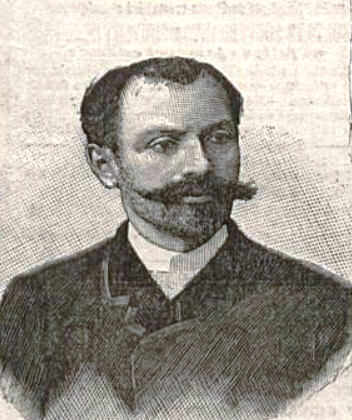
- Born: Joseph Marie François Laval; 26 November 1855; Saint-Junien, France
- Died: 26 February 1917 (aged 61); Bordeaux, France

Joseph Jiel-Laval, real name: Joseph Marie François Laval or Pierre-Joseph Laval, (26 November 1855 – 26 February 1917) was a French cyclist.

== Life ==
Jiel-Laval grew up in Angers. His rode his first race in 1876 on a Penny-farthing for the Véloce-Club d'Angers. The following year he settled in Bordeaux and opened a bicycle shop, initially called Vélocipèdes Jiel-Laval, later Cycles Jiel-Laval. The nickname Jiel originated from the initials of his name Joseph Laval. In Bordeaux he founded the Veloce Club Bordelais and was one of the founders of the Ligue française d'éducation physique. In France, he was one of the most prominent cyclists. Around 1887 , he was sponsored by the French bicycle manufacturer Clément Cycles and his career was managed by retired fellow bicyclist and champion Frédéric de Civry.

In May 1891, Jiel-Laval finished fifth at the first edition of Bordeaux-Paris. On 6 September of the same year he started on a Clément bicycle at the first edition of the 1200-kilometer race Paris-Brest-Paris. First, he led an hour ahead of Charles Terront, but could not hold this because he had to take a break due to exhaustion. Terront's manager H.O. Duncan, however, instructed his rider to drive around the hotel where Jiel-Laval was sleeping in order not to be seen by his companions. When Jiel-Laval woke up, he learned that Terront was two hours ahead of him. Charles Terront ended up winning in 71 hours and 37 minutes, Jiel-Laval finishing second in 80 hours four minutes.

Jiel-Laval died in 1917 at the age of 61. The funeral speech at the funeral was held by well-known journalist Maurice Martin. A year later, his widow left the bike on which her husband lost Paris-Brest-Paris to the Musée des Arts et Métiers in Paris. The city of Bordeaux named the Rue Jiel Laval after him.

== Publications ==
- Une course à bicyclette. In: Philippe Tissié: Guide de Vélocipediste pour l’Entrainement. Bordeaux 1892. S. 227.

== Literature ==
- Didier Rapaud: Le temps de la vélocipédie (1876–1892) ou l'inoubliable Jiel Laval. 2015
