= Georges Paillard =

French cyclist

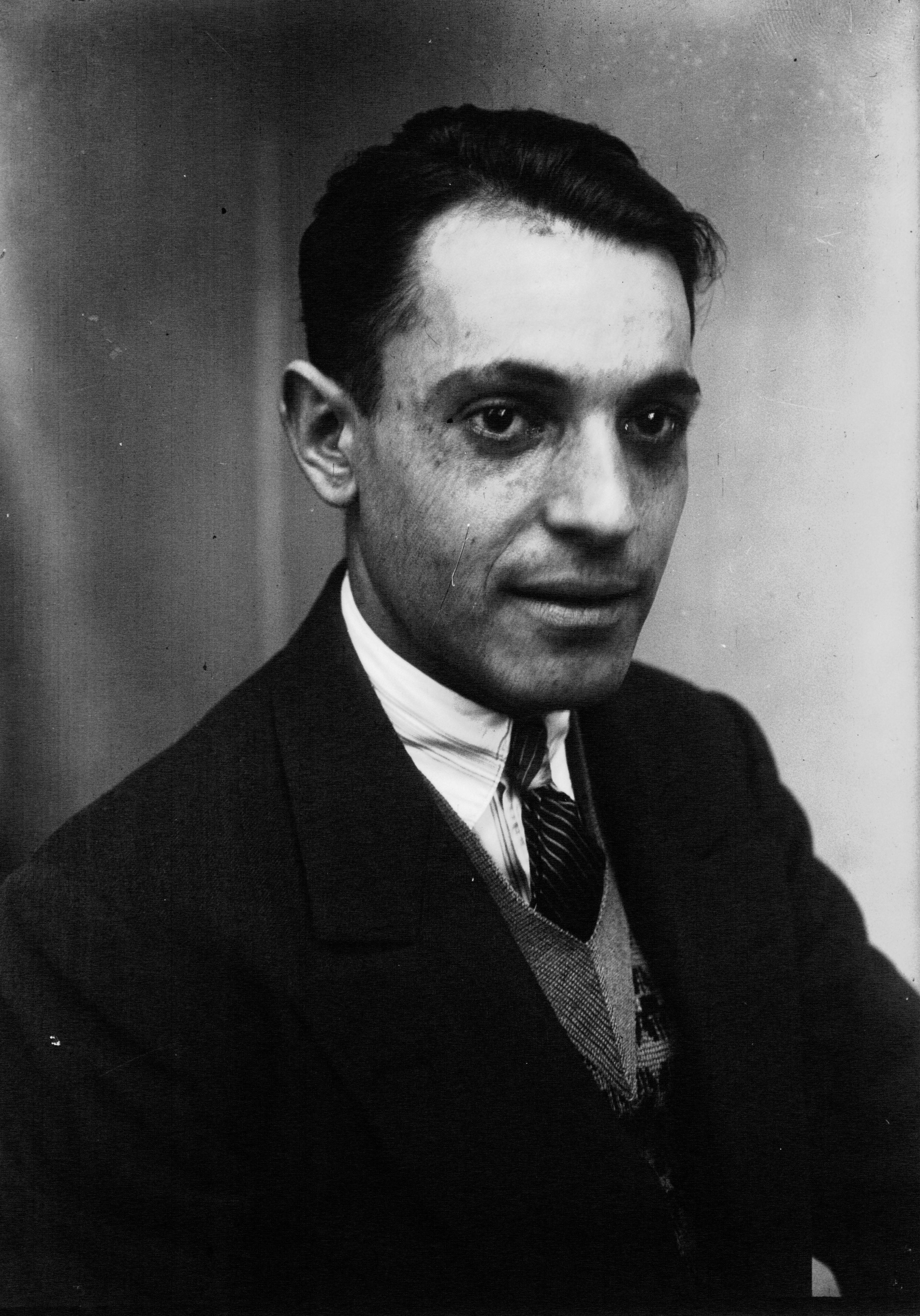
- Paillard in 1929

Personal information
- Born: 12 February 1904 Sainte-Gemmes-d'Andigné, France
- Died: 22 April 1998 (aged 94) Angers, France

Sport
- Sport: Cycling
Medal record
Representing France
UCI Motor-paced World Championships
Gold medal – first place	1929 Zurich	Professionals
Silver medal – second place	1930 Brussels	Professionals
Gold medal – first place	1932 Rome	Professionals

Georges Auguste Joseph Paillard (12 February 1904 – 22 April 1998) was a French cyclist. He won two UCI Motor-paced World Championships in the professionals division in 1929 and 1932 and finished in second place in 1930. Before turning professional in 1923, he competed in the sprint at the 1920 Summer Olympics but failed to reach the finals. As a road cyclist, he won the races of Paris-Dieppe and Rouen-Le Havre in 1923 and Critérium des As in 1937.

On 29 March 1937, he set a world speed record at 137.404 kilometres (85.379 mi) per hour behind a motorcycle pacer on the Autodrome de Linas-Montlhéry. In 1949, he set the hour record at 96.48 kilometres (59.95 mi).
