= Charles Terront =

French cyclist (1857–1932)

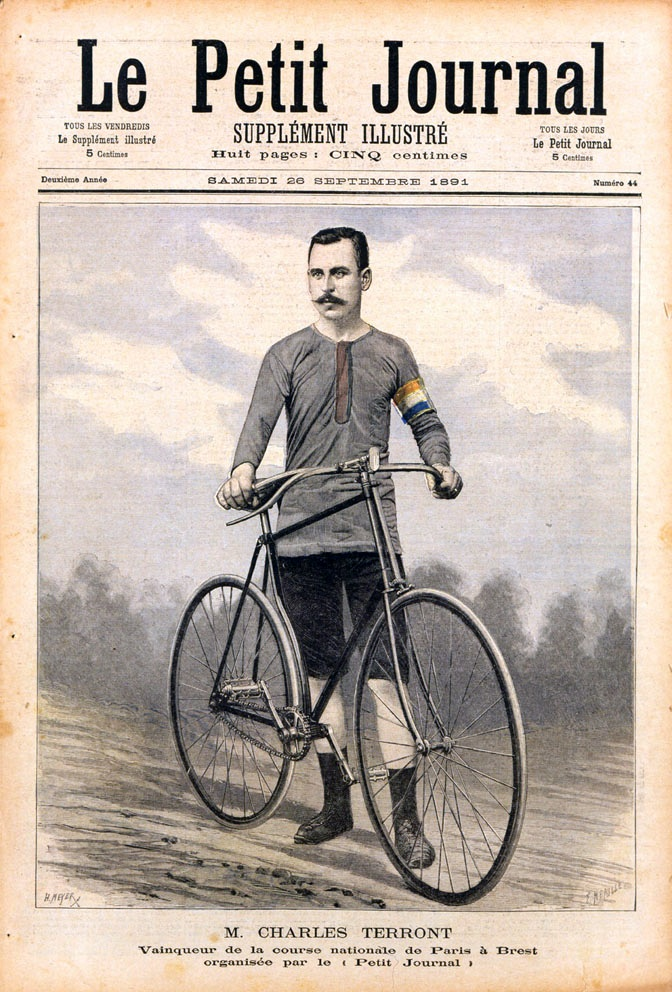
- Terront on the front page of "Le Petit Journal"
- Born: 25 April 1857; Saint-Ouen, Seine-Saint-Denis, France
- Died: 31 October 1932 (aged 75); Sainte-Marguerite-lès-Marseille

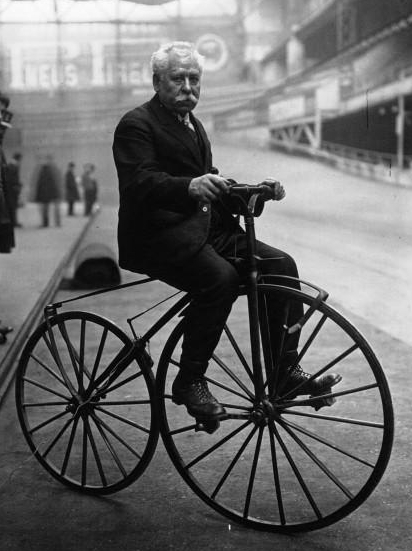
Charles Terront in 1922 riding an 1870s Michaudine velocipede at a velodrome.

Charles Terront (9 April 1857 – 31 October 1932) was the first major French cycling star. He won sprint, middle distance and endurance events in Europe and the United States. In September 1891 he won the first Paris–Brest–Paris cycle race, which at 1,196 kilometres (743 mi) was more than double the length of any previous event. He rode a Humber bicycle fitted with prototype removable pneumatic tyres made by Michelin. He won 54 major events over his 15-year career, was Champion of France twice and Champion of Great Britain twice.

== Early life and career ==
Terront was born in Saint-Ouen, Seine-Saint-Denis. He took up cycle racing in 1876 along with his brother Jules. Charles excelled at both endurance and speed events, and also won many events on a tandem with Jules. He won 54 major solo events over his 15-year career, including being Champion of France twice and Champion of Great Britain twice.

In 1879 Terront covered 546.327 kilometres (339 mi) in 24 hours. On 27 September 1893 he left Saint Petersburg in Russia to cycle 3,000 kilometres (1,864 mi) across Poland and Germany, arriving at the Vélodrome Buffalo in Paris after 14 days and 7 hours. In 1894 he completed a ride from Rome, Italy, to Paris.

== Paris–Brest–Paris cycle race ==
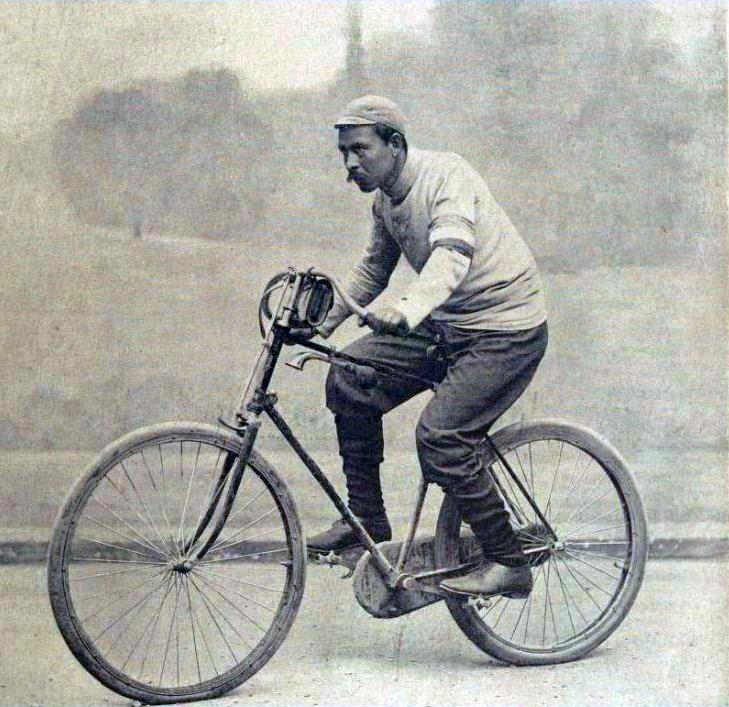
Terront in 1891

Pierre Giffard of Le Petit Journal created the Paris-Brest et retour cycle race in September 1891, describing it as an "épreuve", a test of the bicycle's reliability and the rider's endurance. Riders were fully self-sufficient, carrying their own food and clothing, and riding the same bicycle for the duration. The response was so phenomenal that riders were charged 5 francs to enter, and 300 riders signed up. Each bicycle was given an 'official seal' at a 2-day ceremony; the 280 sealed machines included 10 tricycles, 2 Tandem bicycles, and 1 Penny-farthing. Participation was restricted to French men (7 women were refused entrance), and 99 of the 207 (or 280) participants finished.

Charles Terront won the event, covering the 1,196 kilometres (743 mi) in 71 hours 22 minutes, riding a Humber bicycle from the Beeston works in England. The bicycle weighed 21.5 kilograms and was equipped with Michelin's prototype pneumatic tyres (which were patented in 1891), front brake, curved handlebars, and a chain guard. He passed his main rival Jiel-Laval from Adolphe Clément's Dunlop Clément team, after his manager, H.O. Duncan, advised him to take a detour around the town where his rival was sleeping during the third night. Both had suffered punctures in their pneumatic tyres, but still enjoyed an advantage over riders on solid tires. Terront's arrival in Paris was watched by a crowd of 10,000 people, many of whom had waited throughout the night.

I pushed as hard as I could! The crowd was going delirious and closed in behind me, running as soon as I passed them, until I crossed the line. They tried to lift me off my bike, but I was able to alight on my own. Charles Terront.

== Honours ==
On account of Terront's fame, he was the first athlete to have his memoirs published during his lifetime. In 1893, he explained his life, races, and training methods to French journalist Louis Baudry de Saunier. Also in 1893 En suivant Terront by Herbert Duncan and Pierre Lafitte used 100 drawings to track his ride to Paris from Saint Petersburg.

A plaque in Brest commemorates his 1891 victory in the Paris–Brest–Paris.

The Rue Charles Terront in Nantes is named in his honour.

== Major results by year ==
1876
1st - Paris-Pontoise-Paris
1st - Adamville
1st - Neuilly sur Seine
1st - Créteil
1st - Rouen
1st - Parc de Saint-Maur
1st - Saint-Germain
1st - Angers

1877
1st - Montauban
1st - Angers
1st - Saint-Ouen
1st - La Garenne-Colombes
1st - Charenton-le-Pont
1st - Saint-Denis
1st - ex-aequeo de Paris-Conflans-Sainte-Honorine

1878
1st - Boulogne-Versailles
1st - Argenteuil
1st - Adamville
1st - Maison-Blanche
1st - Rueil
1st - Saint-Denis
1st - Carrousel (Paris)
1st - Pré Catalan
1st - Courbevoie
1st - Versailles
1st - Point du Jour
1st - La Garenne-Colombes
1st - Fougères

1879
1st - Angers-Le Mans-Angers
1st - Angers
1st - Versailles
1st - Chaville
1st - Boulogne-Billancourt-Versailles-Boulogne Billancourt
1st - Carrousel (Paris)
1st - 6 days of Boston
1st - 6 days of Chicago

1880
1st - 6 days of London
1st - 6 days of Edinburgh
1st - 6 days of Kingston upon Hull
1st - Fougères
1st - Saint Denis
1st - Paris

1881
1st - Tours
1st - Paramé

1882
1st - Agen
1st - 6 hours of Angers
3rd Speed Championships of France

1883
1st - Fougères
2nd - Speed Championships of France

1884
1st - Fougères

1885
3rd - Speed Championships of France

1886
2nd - Speed Championships of France
3rd Middle distance Championships of France

1887
1st - 100 mile Championship of Great Britain
Rennes
2nd Middle distance Championships of France

1888
1st - Middle distance Championships of France
1st - 10 mile Championship of Great Britain

1889
1st - Middle distance Championships of France

1891
1st - Paris–Brest–Paris

== See also ==
- James Moore (cyclist) - winner of 'first' cycle races in 1868 in Paris and 1869 Paris–Rouen
- Paris–Rouen - first 'city to city' cycle race (1869)
- Bordeaux–Paris - first long-distance cycle race (May 1891)
- George Pilkington Mills - winner of Bordeaux–Paris cycle race

== Bibliography ==
- Duncan, Herbert Osbaldo & Lafitte, Pierre, En suivant Terront de St-Petersbourg à Paris, 1894
- Terront, Charles, Les mémoires de Terront: sa vie, ses performances, son mode d'entraînement (Collection Les Introuvables), 1980
