= Robert Varnajo =

French cyclist (1929–2024)

Personal information
- Full name: Robert Varnajo
- Born: 1 May 1929 Curzon, Vendée, France
- Died: 13 February 2024 (aged 94)

Cycling career
- Sport: Cycling
- Current team: Retired
- Discipline: Road/Track
- Role: Rider

Major wins
- 1 stage Tour de France
Medal record
Representing France
Men's road bicycle racing
World Championships
Silver medal – second place	1950 Moorslede	Amateur's Road Race

Robert Varnajo (1 May 1929 – 13 February 2024) was a French professional road bicycle racer. In the first part of his career, Varnajo won some road races, including a stage in the 1954 Tour de France. Later in his career, he specialized in track racing, and became French champion three times.

== Major results ==
1952
Paris–Camembert
1953
Paris–Bourges
1954
Circuit des Boucles de la Seine
Tour de France:

Winner stage 23

1961
Poiré-sur-Vie
1962
(France) French National Stayers Championships
1963
(France) French National Stayers Championships
1964
(France) French National Stayers Championships
