= Charles Lacquehay =

French cyclist

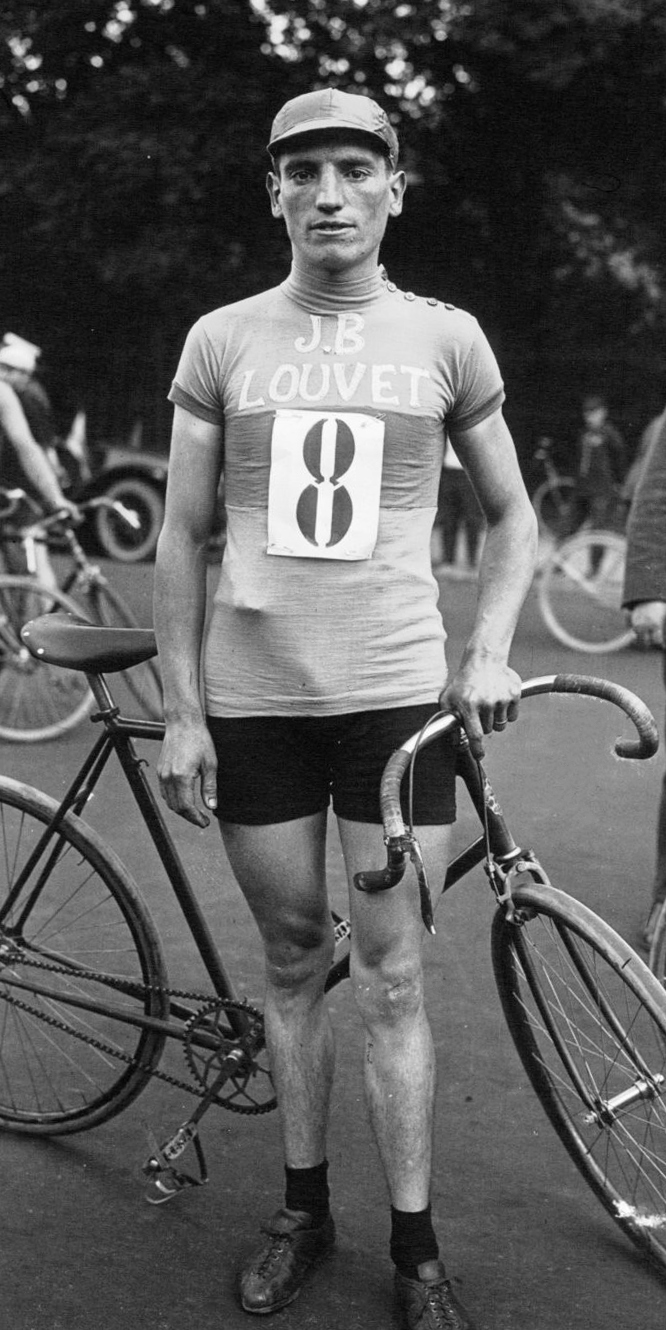
- Charles Lacquehay in 1923

Personal information
- Born: 4 November 1897 Paris, France
- Died: 3 October 1975 (aged 77) Paris, France

Sport
- Sport: Cycling
Medal record
Representing France
UCI Motor-paced World Championships
Gold medal – first place	1933 Paris	Professionals
Gold medal – first place	1935 Brussels	Professionals
Silver medal – second place	1936 Zurich	Professionals

Charles Lacquehay (4 November 1897 – 3 October 1975) was a French professional cyclist who won the UCI Motor-paced World Championships in 1933 and 1935, finishing second in 1936. During his career that spanned from 1919 to 1938 he took part in 21 six-day races, winning five: in Paris (1926, 1928), Berlin (1926), Breslau (1927) and Nice (1928).
