= Lac Daumesnil =

Lake in bois de Vincennes, Paris, France

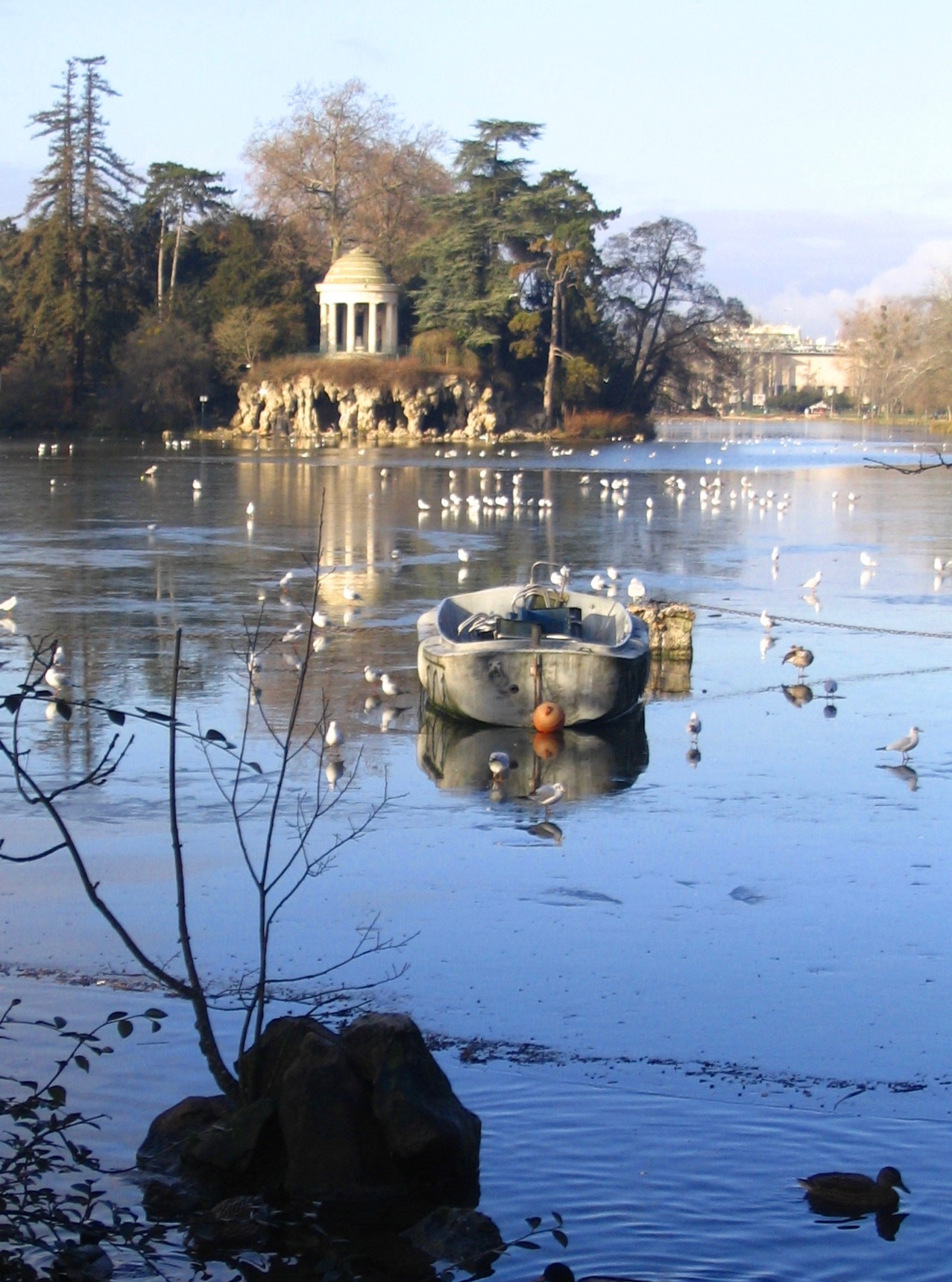

- Location within Paris
- Location: Paris
- Coordinates: 48.830556°N 2.415556°E
- Type: artificial
- Basin countries: France
- Max. length: 0.8 km (0.50 mi)
- Max. width: 0.25 km (0.16 mi)
- Surface area: 0.12 km^{2} (0.046 sq mi)
- Islands: 2

Lac Daumesnil is a lake in the Bois de Vincennes, a public park in Paris, France. Its surface area is 0.12 km^{2}. It is surrounded by "promenade Maurice Boitel".
