= Jean-Jacques Lamboley =

French cyclist

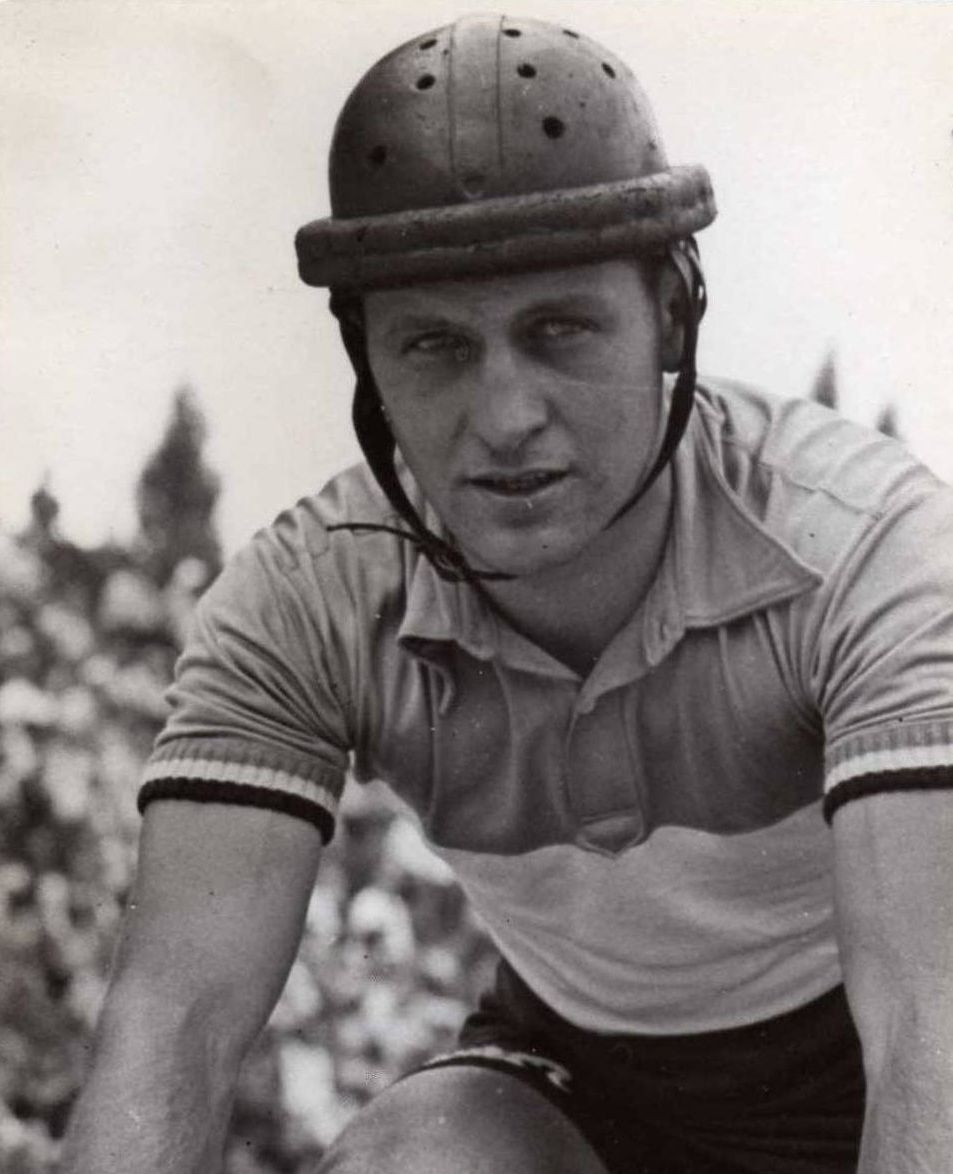

Personal information
- Born: 10 August 1920 Héricourt, France
- Died: 20 July 1999 (aged 78) Thonon-les-Bains, France

Sport
- Sport: Cycling
Medal record
Representing France
UCI Motor-paced World Championships
Silver medal – second place	1947 Paris	Professionals
Gold medal – first place	1948 Amsterdam	Professionals

Jean-Jacques Lamboley (10 August 1920 – 20 July 1999) was a French cyclist who specialised in motor-paced racing. In this discipline he won two national titles, in 1947 and 1948, as well as the UCI Motor-paced World Championships in 1948.
