= Vélodrome Buffalo and Stade Buffalo =

Velodrome in Paris, France

Coordinates: 48°53′07″N 2°17′00″E

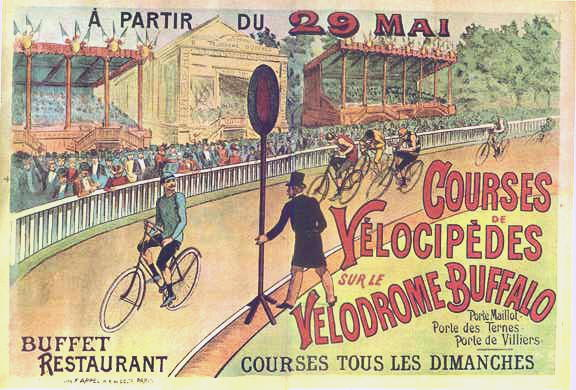
Vélodrome Buffalo

The Vélodrome Buffalo and Stade Buffalo were cycling tracks in Paris. The first existed from 1892 until World War I. The second from 1922 until 1957.

The name derives from the American showman Buffalo Bill Cody, whose circus played on the grounds of the first velodrome.

== The first velodrome ==
The Vélodrome Buffalo was not far from the Porte Maillot in Paris, at Neuilly-sur-Seine. It had been built by May 1892, and originally had a track surface made from cement. The first races took place there on 4 June 1892. On Monday 4 July 1892, Arthur DuCros, representing Ireland, won the ten kilometre scratch event for the Silver Buffalo Challenge Cup at this velodrome. DuCros won by a length from A.E.Good, of London. This race was a ten kilometre race between the British champions.

Several world records were set in this velodrome. On 4 July 1892, in a race contested between the French amateur champions, Henri Fournier set the world record for ten kilometres, with a time of fifteen minutes and fifteen seconds. This beat the previous world record by 1 second. On 13 July 1892, Auguste Stéphane had cycled 631 kilometres in 24 hours. This distance beat the English record over 24 hours held by Holbein, by 49 kilometres. And it beat the American record held by Waller, by 46 kilometres.

Henri Desgrange set the first ratified hour record on 11 May 1893 covering 35.325 km. In May 1893 a rider called Cassignard set the world kilometre standing start record at 1 minute and 28 seconds.

On 27 September 1893 French cycling star Charles Terront left Saint Petersburg in Russia to cycle the 3,000 kilometres (1,864 mi) across Poland and Germany before arriving at the Vélodrome Buffalo after 14 days and 7 hours.

The Bol d'Or 24-hour race began at the track in 1894 and was frequently run there.

On 19 May 1895, the Welsh rider Jimmy Michael broke the 100 miles cycling record and registered a time of 4 hours, 2 minutes and 45 seconds. The French champion Constant Huret was second place in this race, 5 minutes and 12 seconds behind Michael. On 8 June 1895, Jimmy beat his own time over 100 miles at the same track, during a 6 hour race against Gaston Rivierre, Tom Linton, Constant Huret, Lucien Lesna, The, Charles Lucas, and Aries.

The writer Tristan Bernard was director of the track in 1895. He is supposed to have introduced the practice of ringing a bell to announce the last lap of a race.

The track was renovated in 1902 to accommodate 8,000 spectators. This new renovation was completed on the same site as the old track, within five minutes walk of the Porte Maillot. The lap was reduced to 330 yards (301.752 metres), and laid with a new surface made from wood. The velodrome opened again on 6 April 1902.

The original velodrome was demolished during World War I and the land used for an aeroplane factory.

== The second velodrome ==
Le Stade Buffalo was near Paris, at Montrouge.

It opened on 24 September 1922 and was demolished in 1957. It could accommodate 30,000 spectators for football matches and 40,000 for boxing matches. It housed a concrete cycling track. It continued to occasionally host the Bol d'Or cycle race.

It hosted 4 significant boxing matches from 1922-1924. Most notably Georges Carpentier vs. Battling Siki for the World Light-Heavyweight Championship.

This stadium hosted three international football matches: on 13 January 1924 France beat Belgium 2–0 in front of 27,000 spectators; on 21 February 1921 they beat Ireland 4-0 and on 7 December 1930 they drew 2–2 with Belgium.

From 1929 until 1937, the stadium hosted the Dirt Track Championnat du Monde (an early version of the Speedway World Championship and rival of the Star Riders' Championship). The motorcycle speedway was held on an oval track measuring a distance of 382 metres. The stadium also held international fixtures between France and England and the last recorded fixture was in 1949.

On 2 January 1938, the stadium hosted the inaugural rugby league test match between Australia and France, won 35-6 by Australia.

== See also ==
- List of cycling tracks and velodromes
