= Arthur Linton =

British road bicycle racer (1868-1896

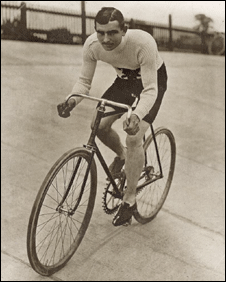

Personal information
- Full name: Arthur Vincent Linton
- Born: 28 November 1868 Seavington St Michael, England
- Died: 23 July 1896 (aged 27) Aberaman, Wales

Cycling career
- Sport: Cycling
- Current team: Retired
- Discipline: Road
- Role: Rider

Amateur team
- 1890–1893: –

Professional team
- 1893–1896: –

Major wins
- 1896 Bordeaux–Paris

Arthur Vincent Linton (28 November 1868 – 23 July 1896) was a British road bicycle racer. He is best known for sharing victory in the Bordeaux–Paris road race in 1896 and for breaking the Welsh one-hour paced cycling record. His death just two months after the 1896 Bordeaux–Paris is steeped in controversy with some commentators speculating that his demise was caused by doping.

== History ==
=== Early career ===
Linton was born in 1868 in Seavington St Michael, Somerset in England to John, innkeeper of the 'Volunteer', and his wife Sarah. There is disagreement as to Linton's date of birth, with many sources stating he was born in 1872, though this is challenged by the 1881 Census which returns the date of 1868. The family moved to south Wales when Linton was three. Linton grew up in the Welsh coal mining village of Aberaman, and at the age of 12 began working down the mine at the Treaman colliery as a door-boy, later becoming a haulier. One of four brothers, his eldest brother John was also a coal miner, but it was Linton's passion for cycling that enthused his two younger brothers Tom and Samuel, both of whom were successful bike racers. Linton himself began making a name for himself as a cyclist whilst still a teen. His first bike was a penny-farthing, but he later switched to a safety bicycle, a more suitable and lower racing bike.

By 1890 Linton had entered and won several races both in South Wales and in England. His brother Samuel was also succeeding as a racer, but after a few accidents he gave the sport up. In 1893 Linton entered the 24-hour 'Cuca Cocoa Challenge Cup' in London, and despite leading at one stage he was forced to retire after coming under intense pressure from the eventual winner, England's Frank Shorland. In the summer of 1893 Linton entered the 'Gold Cup' held at Fallowfield Stadium in Manchester. Linton overcame a strong field to be crowned champion and was spotted by ex-champion sprinter, James "Choppy" Warburton. Warburton became Linton's manager and he accepted a professional contract with Gladiator Cycles.

=== Professional career ===
In the winter of 1893 Linton and Warburton travelled to France to undertake a season of competitive races at the Vélodrome d'hiver in central Paris. Shortly before leaving for France, Warburton had arranged for Linton to undertake a challenge for the world One-Hundred Miles Record at the newly built Herne Hill Velodrome in London. When Linton broke the record it raised his profile higher, even before his arrival in Paris. Linton's time in France was a success, winning many races and beating several champion opponents.

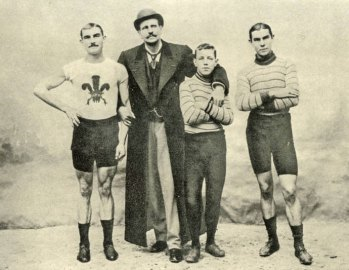
Linton (left) along with manager Choppy Warburton, fellow cyclist Jimmy Michael and brother Tom

In 1894 Warburton took on two more Welsh cyclists, Linton's younger brother Tom and cycling prodigy Jimmy Michael, who also came from Aberaman. Linton continued to build upon his early successes, and in the August of that year, in a 100 km race at the Vélodrome Buffalo where he faced an American rider, Linton broke several records. His time of 1 hour 58 minutes and 59 seconds over 50 miles beat the world record held by South Africa's Laurens Meintjes, and the same race saw him take the 100 km record from Frenchman and rival Constant Huret.

Where 1894 had catapulted him to European fame, 1895 was a poor year for Linton. He injured his knee, saw a poor run of form and split from Warburton's management. That year Tom Linton and Jimmy Michael struck up a public rivalry, which saw the normally media-shy Arthur Linton sucked into a spat between the two men. Michael took offence at Linton's publicity title as 'The Champion of the World', and a challenge was laid down for the two to race, though the event never took place. 1895 was also marred by the death of Linton's mother while he was abroad in France. Linton also found himself out of favour with the cycling authorities in France, when after agreeing to enter a meet in Brussels, he was threatened with disqualification from future French races by the Societie de Paris over a permit issue. Linton agreed to their demands with his eye on the major competitions in Paris. One of his few successes during 1895 was also snatched from him when he achieved a new world record in the 100 km which had recently been set by Jules Dubois. Although reported as having taken 13 seconds from Dubois time by a journalist from Sporting Life, the lack of an official timer meant that the new time could not be taken into account.

In 1896 Linton continued to push himself in professional competitions both in Britain and in France. From March until the Bordeaux–Paris race in May, Linton took part in a long distance race every week. Amongst these races was the 1896 Paris–Roubaix, in which Linton finished fourth. This result of this self-imposed heavy schedule saw his health deteriorate and he was forced to pull out mid-race in both the Catford Gold Vase and the 24-hour Bol d'Or in Paris. Despite this he entered the Bordeaux–Paris race. The race was gruelling and Linton's race was besieged by accidents and mishaps. After taking an early lead from his main rival, Gaston Rivière, Linton's bike lost a nut from his back wheel resulting in a severe head wound and an unrideable bicycle. He walked ten kilometres, losing his lead, and then borrowed a bike from Constant Huret to allow him to continue. Hampering him further was that Huret's bike was fitted with a 64-inch gear, whereby Linton trained and rode on a bike with a 94-inch gear. It would be another 30 to 40 kilometres before Linton reached the next stop point where he could replace the bike for a model that suited him. Over the following stages, Linton managed to gain on Rivière and retook his lead. In the final stretch of the race after he had entered Paris, Linton not realising that the course had been changed due to roadworks, took the wrong route over the Seine. While crossing the Seine he collided with another cyclist and suffered a more serious injury, gashing his knee and suffering another head wound. With Rivière gaining ground Linton returned to his bike and pushed on and on entering the Veledrome witnesses, including fellow competitor Henri Desgrange, commented that Linton looked in terrible health. Linton finished in a quicker overall time to Rivière and was awarded the win, but after it was discovered that Linton had not followed the organised route the title was given to Rivière. After an appeal, in which it was noted that the route change had been published in the French press and the riders not officially instructed, the two men were jointly awarded the title and shared the prize money.

== Death and aftermath ==
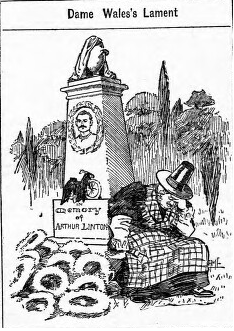
The Death of Arthur Linton by J.M. Staniforth

Shortly after his win in the Bordeaux-Paris, Linton entered two more races in London and Paris, but ill health forced him to retire from both. After the Paris race Linton's health was so poor that he was forced to return home to Aberaman. On 23 July 1896, at the home of a Mr. Michael Thomas a local contractor from Aberdare, Linton died of complications brought on by typhoid fever. His funeral took place on 27 July, his body taken from Thomas' house at Cardiff Road to Aberdare Cemetery. Hundreds of mourners lined the route and members of local and national cycling clubs were present. Several professional cyclists attended the funeral, including his rival Huret. In 1899 a memorial to Linton in the form of a stained glass window and lectern was unveiled in St Margaret's Church in Aberaman.

Although not an issue at the time of his death, in the years following, Linton's image was tarnished by speculation that his death was caused by doping. The seeds of the story began in 1897, when Jimmy Michael was banned from racing in Britain due to a doping controversy. It was well known that Michael's and Linton's manager Choppy Warburton would carry a 'little black bottle' of an unknown substance to revive his flagging cyclists. During a meet in 1896, Warburton had given Michael a swig from his bottle, but the results did not enhance his performance and Michael was forced to retire. Michael claimed that Warburton had poisoned him, and Warburton then sued Michael for slander. This resulted in Warburton being effectively banned from all cycling events and Michael relocating to America. Although no record of the contents of Warburton's bottle was ever discovered it was speculated to be either strychnine or a substance known as 'trimethyl'. Although doping was not illegal under the rules of cycling at the time, and was common in many racing sports, it was felt that Warburton and Michael had crossed the line of acceptable behaviour.

This incident then led some commentators to wonder if Linton's death was brought on by doping, despite Warburton and Linton having parted company the year earlier. In the 20th century the subject of Linton's death was raised again when his demise was included in the 1997 International Olympic Committee study on the Historical Evolution of Doping Phenomenon, and listed as the presumed first death due to doping during a competition. This was then repeated in a talk by Dr Gary Wadler who incorrectly associated the death of a cyclist at the 1886 Bordeaux–Paris race, referencing the former Olympic study. Other publications to have printed the story include Bob Goldman's Death in the Locker Room (1984), Barrie Houlihan's Dying to Win (1999), Les Woodland's Dope (1980), and The Sport Psych Handbook of 2005. These reports are littered with inaccuracies including the date of the race, five years before the first Bordeaux–Paris race in 1891, and the fact that the 'competitor' widely believed to be Linton, died during the race.

In 2009 a blue plaque was unveiled at a ceremony at his home town and erected at his family home on Cardiff Road in Aberaman. The Cynon Valley Museum and Gallery also holds a bust of Linton, which is still on display.
