= Charley Barden =

British cyclist

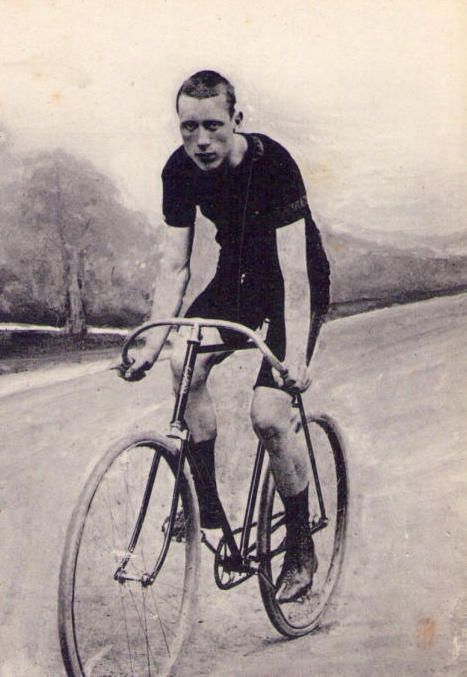

Personal information
- Full name: Charles Frédérick Barden

Cycling career
- Sport: Cycling
- Discipline: track
- Role: Rider
- Rider type: Sprinter

Charles Frédérick Barden (1874–1962) was a British cyclist. He placed second in the UCI Track Cycling World Championships men's sprint in 1896 and 1897. He held the English cycling title among other records. He was accused of dangerous riding among his colleagues. His career was ruined after the death of a fellow rider allegedly due to his negligence.

== Early life ==
Barden was born in Canterbury, Kent, England. Beginning in 1881, Barden was a resident of the Borough of Chelsea. In 1891 he moved to Kensal Rise. He began racing in his early teens and moved to London where he joined the Polytechnic Cycling Club, making friends with one of the stars, Bert Harris. The two eventually toured Europe together to race in tournaments.

== Racing ==
In 1892 Barden moved to the club at Catford, then in the countryside south of the city. The Catford club held races in the streets of the village and built a track reputed to be the fastest in Europe. Barden's talent was noticed and developed there.

In 1895 Barden rode at Catford against Jimmy Michael of Wales, who won the world's first motor-paced racing championship that year in Cologne, Germany. The occasion – which prompted tales of doping and fixing of races – was called a chain match because it pitted riders using the new Simpson lever chains against riders using the standard roller chains. Riders who used Simpson chains were contracted to compete against those using the older design, to prove which was superior. While most accounts say the race was held in Catford, others say it was Germany. Barden and Michael were pitched in a five-mile race in front of a crowd of about 15,000. Right before the race, Michael took a drink provided to him by his coach and manager, Choppy Warburton and began the race. He rode poorly and ended with falling off his bike, remounting and setting off in the wrong direction. Michael's strange behaviour led him to accuse Warburton of doping him. Barden, too, later made accusations of race-fixing and they were to ruin his career in Britain.

Barden rode the world professional track championship at Copenhagen in 1896 and Glasgow in 1897, finishing second on both occasions. His fame and looks drew huge crowds at velodromes and he was mobbed by fans wherever he went. He was English champion in 1896 and broke records from 440 yards to 10 miles.

== Accusations and downfall ==
Bert Harris was the first English sprint champion. In one meeting in Australia he won £800, at a time when a skilled worker in England earned £85 a year. On Easter Monday, 1897, three years after Harris' national championship, with his career starting to fade, he rode at a meeting on the track at Aston, Birmingham. He crashed in the 10-mile race, hitting his head on the track. He died on 21 April without regaining consciousness.

Barden accused other riders in the race of causing the fall by cutting away the front wheel through their riding so Harris would not win. The National Cyclists Union held an inquiry and Barden made himself more unpopular by accusing witnesses of "out and out lies". The issue split fans of cycling, but race promoters were more united and Barden found it harder to get engagements.

He could still compete in races on the continent and moved to Paris. He lived there until 1899.

Years later, in 1903, Barden participated in the first London Six Day race, where he was initially partnered with Frenchman Raoul Buisson, who was later replaced by Italian Anteo Carapezzi. They finished third, covering 819 miles, 20 miles less than winners Hall and Martin.

== Personal life ==
He married his first wife Mary in 1897 and by 1911 had 5 children – 2 of whom died as children.

When he retired and returned to England, he joined the Merchant Navy, sailing on a troop ship to the Boer War. He moved to Leicester, where Bert Harris had lived, and married a girl in the city. He opened a shop in Saffron Lane, Leicester, where a cycle track was later built, then worked at Bentley Engineering in the city. He joined the Working Men's Club, but rarely spoke of his career.
