= Liermi =

French cyclist

Gilbert Miriel
Personal information
- Full name: Gilbert Emile Marie Aristide Miriel
- Nickname: Liermi
- Born: 8 May 1869 Brest, France
- Died: 17 July 1898 (aged 29) Léhon, France

Cycling career
- Sport: Cycling
- Role: Rider

Liermi (racing name of Gilbert Miriel) (8 May 1869 – 17 July 1898) was a French racing cyclist. As the son of designer/painter Gilbert Miriel he chose to adopt the pseudonym "Liermi" for his racing career. His best year was 1896 with good results in France's elite one-day classic races Paris - Roubaix and Bordeaux - Paris.

His best performance was probably the 8th place in the infamous 1896 Bordeaux - Paris. In the aftermath of that race, winner Arthur Linton died of typhoid fever, but soon afterwards the excessive use of stimulants during the race were considered to have caused this. Also Liermi would never be the same after the race. His mental health rapidly declined and in 1898 he was admitted into the psychiatric hospital "Les Bas Foins" of the brothers of Saint-Jean-de-Dieu in Léhon, Bretagne where he died later that year.

== Major results ==
1896
8th, Bordeaux – Paris
17th, Paris - Roubaix
9th, Paris - Mons
