= Amélie Le Gall =

French cyclist

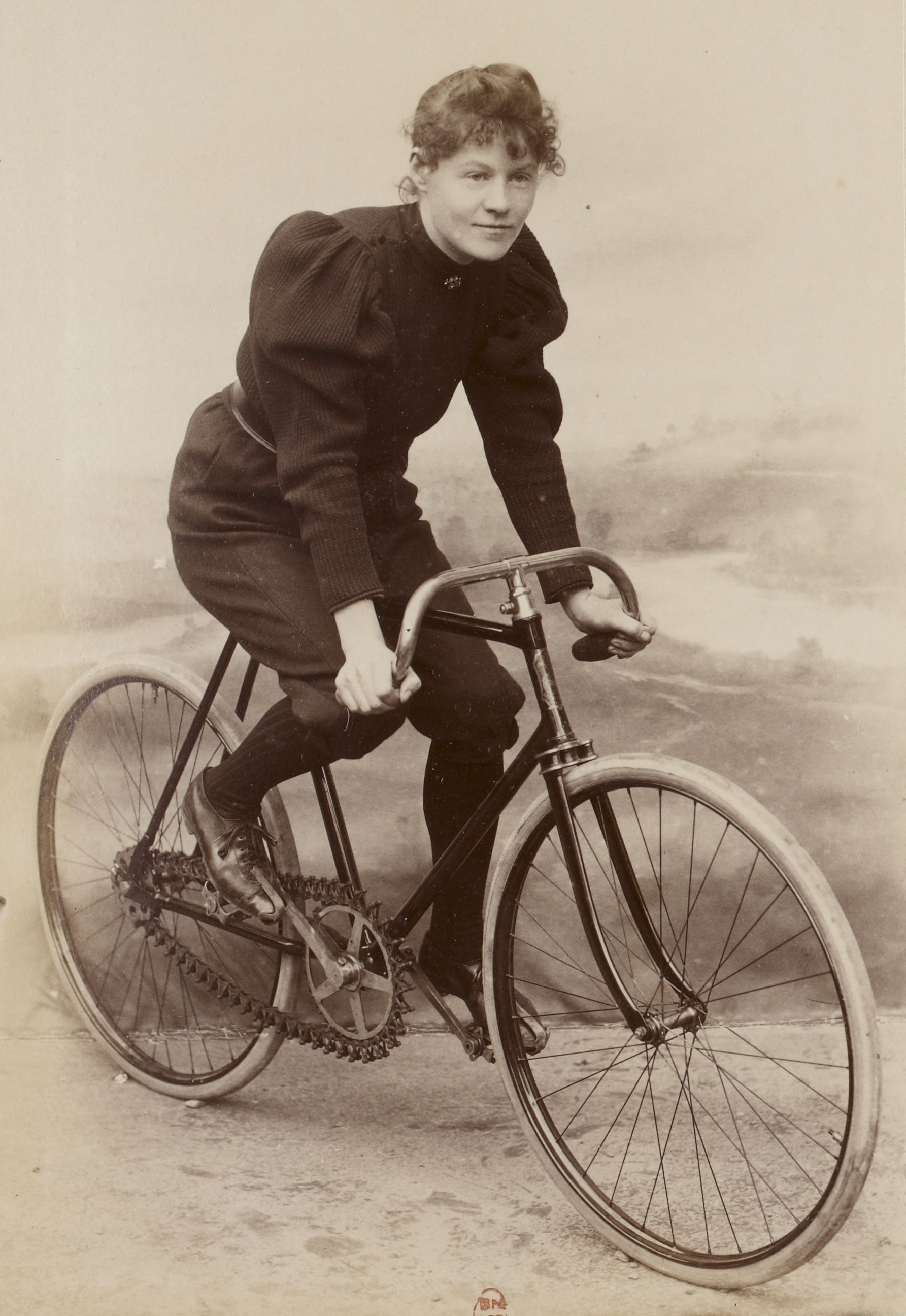
- Le Gall on a Gladiator bicycle in 1896
- Born: Amélie Le Gall; March 19, 1869; Quintin
- Other names: Mademoiselle Lisette; Lisette Marton
- Occupation: Cyclist

Amélie Le Gall, known as Mademoiselle Lisette or Lisette Marton, (19 March 1869 – unknown) was a French competitive cyclist. She was considered the women's world champion in the sport in 1896.

== Early life ==
Amélie Le Gall was the daughter of a carpenter. She was reportedly working as a shepherdess in Brittany when she was wooed by a male cyclist who married her and trained her in the sport.

== Career ==
Amélie Le Gall began competing in France, at exhibition contests to promote the new sport. In 1895, Marton competed in a race at the Royal Aquarium in London. She defeated Scottish cyclist Clara Grace for the women's world championship in 1896, and sometimes raced male riders, as when she defeated Albert Champion.

She trained with controversial English coach Choppy Warburton and was sponsored by Simpson chain, a British bicycle chain manufacturer. She raced in Chicago in 1898 and in Winnipeg in 1900.

Her clothing was often described in detail, as the question of what women should wear on a bicycle was a topic of discussion at the time. "In France, Lisette never wears a dress," reported one Chicago newspaper in 1898, continuing that "Lisette dislikes corsets. To her they seem the culminating point in feminine attire of ugliness, unsuitability, and anti-hygienic stupidity."
