= Clara Grace =

British cyclist

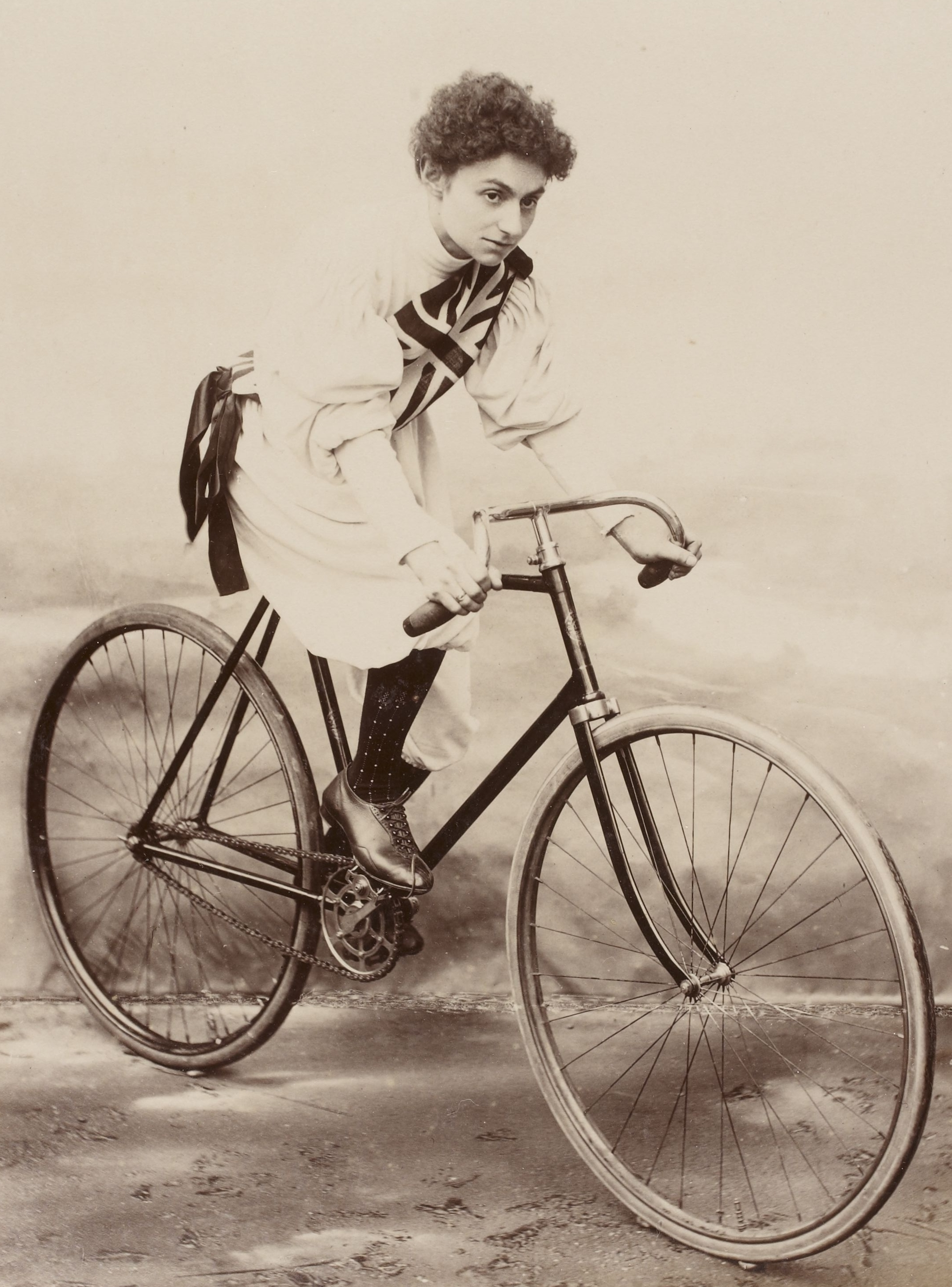
- Clara Grace posed on a racing bicycle in 1896
- Born: Clara Simmons; 1865; Redbourn, Hertfordshire
- Died: Unknown
- Occupation: Bicycle racer

Clara Simmons Grace (born 1865) was a British bicycle racer.

== Early life ==
Clara Simmons was born in Redbourn, Hertfordshire, the daughter of George Simmons and Emma Simmons.

== Career ==
Grace and her older sister Katherine worked as straw basket makers as teenagers. She started bicycling after she married, and became serious about it after her fourth child was born. She joined the Wood Green Cycling Club, and competed in two women's half-mile races in 1894. She started touring with a club of other women cyclists in 1895; her husband was also racing competitively at the time. Grace set women's records in road endurance racing in 1895 and 1896, including riding 50 miles (80 kilometers) in 2:41:49, riding from London to Coventry (92 miles (148 kilometers)) in 6:03:17, and riding from London to Brighton (104 miles (167 kilometers)) in 7:40:35.

Grace advanced to professional and international competitive cycling by the end of 1895, winning events in London and Paris. She endorsed St. Jacobs Oil and the Matto Chain for pain relief in newspaper advertisements. She lost a well-publicized 100 km race against Amélie Le Gall (Mademoiselle Lisette) in Paris in 1896. She retired from racing in 1899, after a fall in 1896.

== Personal life ==
In 1885, Grace married William Matthew Grace; they moved to London, where he worked as a hairdresser. They had four children by 1891. After their bicycle racing days were past, they lived in Wood Green, and she worked as a cashier in 1911. William Grace died in 1914; Clara Grace lived into the 1940s.
