= Charles Meyer (cyclist) =

Danish cyclist

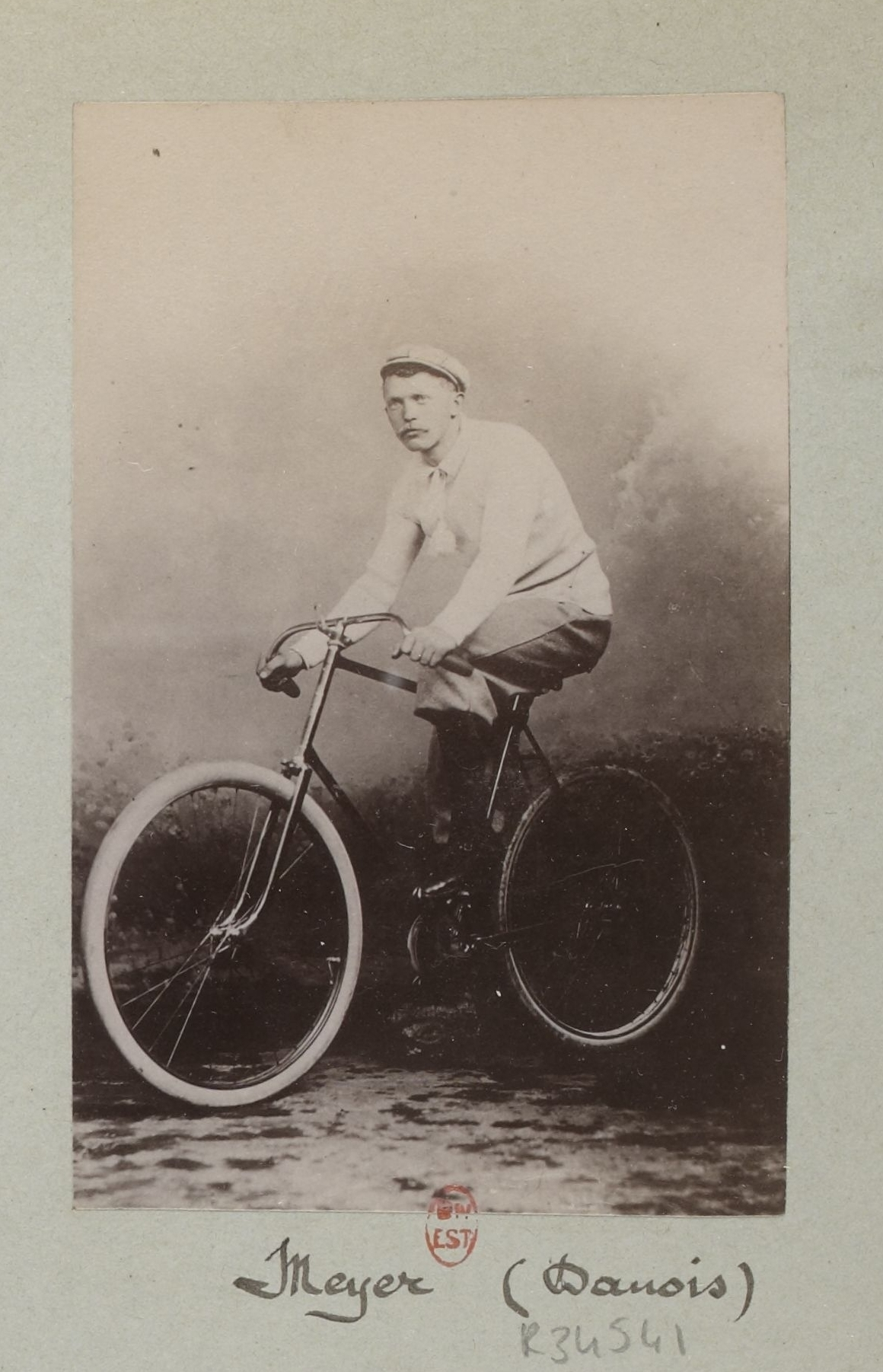

Personal information
- Full name: Carl Wilhelm Meyer
- Nickname: Charles
- Born: 16 March 1868 Flensburg, Prussia (now Germany)
- Died: 31 January 1931 (aged 62) Dieppe, France

Cycling career
- Sport: Cycling
- Role: Rider

Major wins
- Bordeaux-Paris 1895

Charles Meyer (16 March 1868 – 31 January 1931) was a Danish racing cyclist. He won the 560 km long Bordeaux–Paris in 1895, and finished second in the 1896 Paris–Roubaix and fifth in the 1898 race.
