= 1896 Paris–Roubaix =

1st Paris–Roubaix
Race details
- Dates: 19 April 1896
- Stages: 1
- Distance: 280 km (170 mi)
- Winning time: 9h 17' 00"

Results
	Winner	Josef Fischer (GER)
	Second	Charles Meyer (DEN)
	Third	Maurice Garin (ITA)

The first edition of Paris–Roubaix, a classic one-day cycle race in France, was held on 19 April 1896. The event covered 280 km (174 mi) from Paris to the velodrome in Roubaix. The winner was German Josef Fischer who received 1.000 francs for the win, a considerable sum of money at the time. The race, as were all editions until 1909, was motorpaced.

== Origin ==
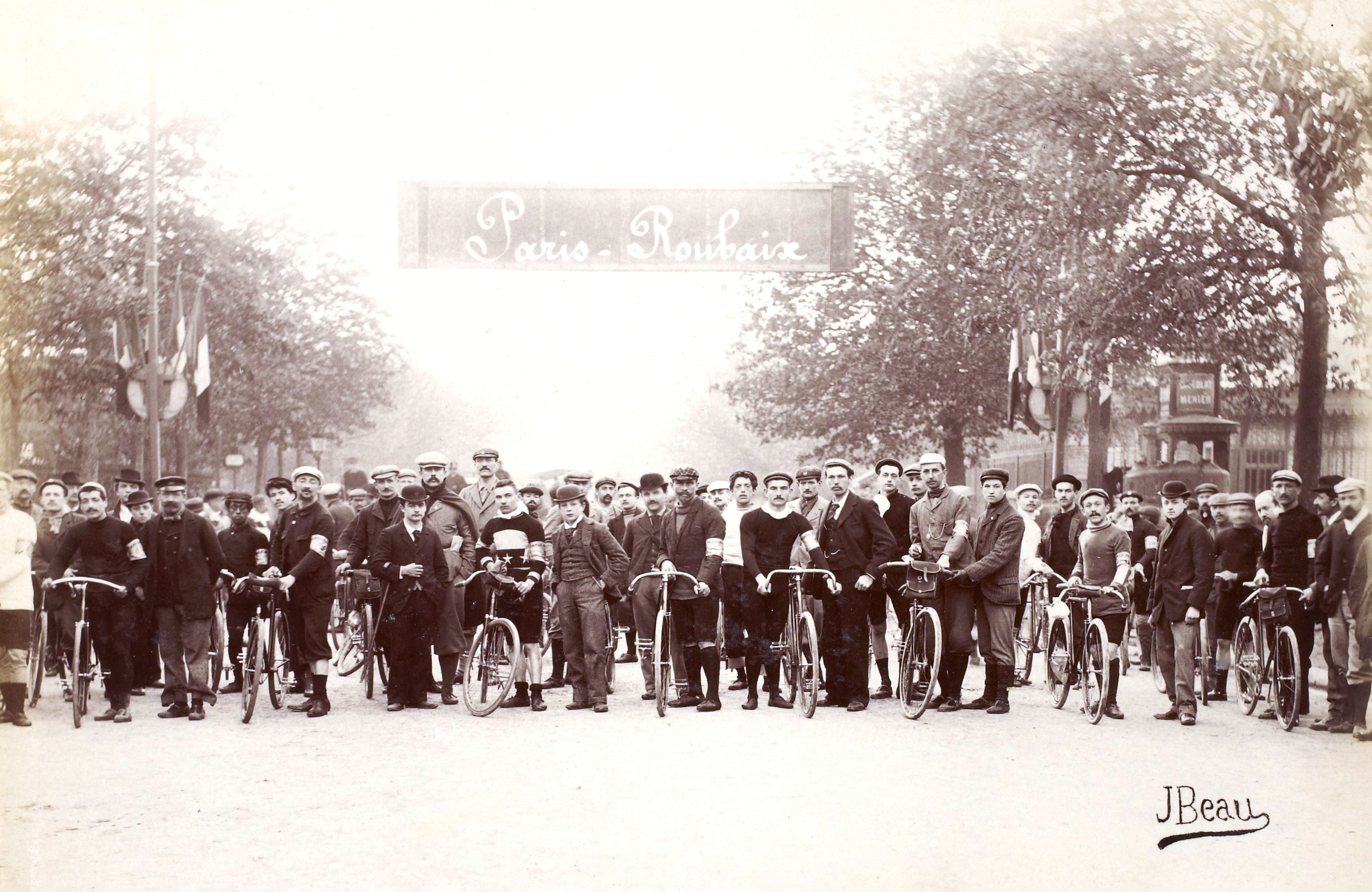
The riders on the start line

The race was created by two Roubaix textile manufacturers, Théodore Vienne and Maurice Perez, who had built a velodrome in Roubaix and wished to promote the track. Before its first running, it was first presented to the sponsor, Le Vélo, as a training race for the then well-established, now defunct, Bordeaux–Paris. As Roubaix was a small provincial town at the time, a professional bike race finishing there would be very good for business.

Paul Rousseau, the director of Le Vélo, agreed to start the race outside the paper's offices in Paris. He designed a route and sent out Victor Breyer, (Note: the man who stood at the top of the Tourmalet in 1910 and was called a "murderer" by a rider) in order to test the route. Breyer drove to Amiens by car, before continuing by bike the following day. When he reached Roubaix, he was cold and covered in mud. He was miserable enough to suggest the race be called off, but a shower and a meal changed his mind.

== Race overview ==
As many as half the riders who were supposed to ride stayed in bed, including Henri Desgrange, who later organised the first Tour de France. Notably, the winner of that first Tour de France, Maurice Garin, did start the race, finished third and went on to win the following two editions in subsequent years.

The race was full of incidents, Welshman Arthur Linton, who finished fourth, crashed six times, once after hitting a dog. The winner, Josef Fischer, had a lead of 23 minutes until he was almost knocked off by a horse and was then halted by cows. When Fischer entered the velodrome in Roubaix he was covered in filth and blood. Only three other riders finished within an hour, all in similar conditions.

== Results ==
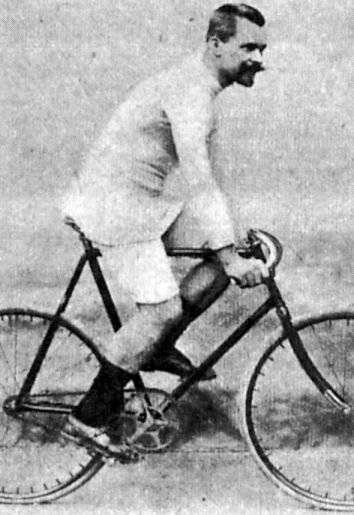
Josef Fischer won the first ever Paris–Roubaix.

Final results (1-10)
Rank	Cyclist	Time
1	Josef Fischer (GER)	9h 17' 00″
2	Charles Meyer (DEN)	+25' 00″
3	Maurice Garin (ITA)	+28' 00″
4	Arthur Linton (GBR)	+45' 00″
5	Lucien Stein (FRA)	+1h 01' 00″
6	Boinet (FRA)	+1h 01' 50″
7	Emile Van Berendonck (BEL)	+1h 07' 50″
8	Henri Aries (FRA)	+1h 43' 00″
9	Gaston Pachot (FRA)	+2h 02' 00″
10	Pierre Mercier (FRA)	+2h 16' 00″

Final results (11–26)
Rank	Cyclist	Time
11	Gouff (FRA)	+2h 29' 00″
12	Eugène Faiteau (FRA)	+2h 44' 00″
13	Liermi (FRA)	+4h 03' 00″
14	Gaston Vart (FRA)	+4h 05' 00″
15	Amédée Naert (BEL)	+4h 16' 00″
16	Fritz Vanderstuyft (BEL)	+4h 17' 00″
17	Vendredi (FRA)	+4h 22' 00″
18	Emile Taquet (FRA)	+5h 22' 00″
19	Arsène Millocheau (FRA)	+6h 01' 00″
20	Lecornu (FRA)	+7h 23' 00″
21	Revilio Norsath (FRA)	+8h 01' 00″
22	Vautrelle (FRA)	+8h 02' 00″
23	Georges Aymard (FRA)	s.t.
24	Sagre (FRA)	+8h 11' 00″
25	Feys (BEL)	+8h 39' 00″
26	Guillochin (FRA)	s.t.
27	Theron (FRA)	s.t.
28	Albert Dumas (FRA)	s.t.
