= Jimmy Michael =

Welsh cyclist (1877–1904)

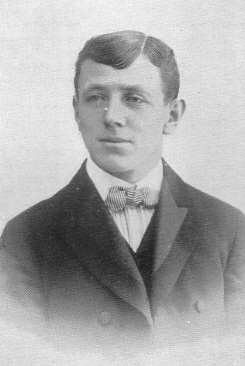

Personal information
- Full name: Jimmy Michael
- Born: 18 August 1877 Aberaman, Wales
- Died: 21 November 1904 (aged 27)
- Height: 5 ft 1 1/2 in (156 cm)

Cycling career
- Sport: Cycling
- Discipline: Track
- Role: Rider
- Rider type: Stayer

Professional teams
- Simpson Chain Company
- Gladiator

Major wins
- Welsh championships at five and 50 miles. 1894 – Surrey Hundred in World Record time 1895 – World motor-paced champion (Cologne); 1895 – Equalled Linton's record for 50 km.

Jimmy Michael (18 August 1877 – 21 November 1904) was a Welsh world cycling champion and one of the top riders in the sport for several years.

== Origins ==
Jimmy Michael was 5 ft 1 1/2 in (156.2 cm) tall. He was born in Aberaman, Cynon Valley, Wales. His parents had a butcher's shop in the town and he started cycling when he was 12. His first successes were at sports meetings in Glynneath and Mountain Ash. He went on to win larger meetings in Cardiff, Newport and Merthyr. He also won Welsh championships at five and 50 miles.

Michael went to London in July 1894 to ride the Surrey Hundred at Herne Hill velodrome. Mal Rees, writing in Sporting Cyclist after an interview with Michael's brother, Billy, said:

The crowd laughed to see such a 'David' having the temerity to start in a race of that length against so many six-footers. Cycling chroniclers of the day, reporting on the event, were astounded as the Welsh boy matched every attack in the hectic early stages. 'Who was this youth who dared to hang on to London's speediest riders?', they wrote. In the first hour, 24 miles 475 yards had been covered and 'the little hero' Jimmy Michael dogged the heels of the leaders until he succeeded in breaking away himself to lap the field at 46 miles.

At two hours, with 48 miles 377 yards covered, he was just outside the record, but at the 50-mile mark was inside with 2h 4m 42s. There seems to have been no serious threat during the second fifty for Michael consolidated his lead and went on to win in 4h 19m 39s with a seven-minute margin from the runner-up. This was a new record.

His performance brought him two contracts to ride in Paris.

== Professional ==
Michael turned professional in 1895 for the Gladiator bicycle company, where he joined Arthur Linton, another rider from his town. Both were coached by Choppy Warburton. Michael became world motor-paced champion the same year at Cologne and equalled Linton's record for 50 km. Linton had a poor year and their relationship soured. Linton's brother, Tom, made some comment in 1896 that prompted this newspaper letter from Michael:

Seeing that Tom Linton has been boasting in the South Wales papers that he can beat me, and that he would be willing to ride me any time, and also that his brother Arthur was 'champion of the world,' I will ride either of them, and will give them two laps in 100 kilometres, three in 100 miles, or four laps in six hours for £100 a-side and all gate receipts, race to be ridden at Buffalo or Winter track in Paris. I have deposited £20 with Sporting Life, so all they have to do is cover it and they can be accommodated at once, or give over talking. Anyone else in the world can be taken on the same terms, as I am middle-distance champion of the world and not A Linton. I am, &c.,
Jimmy Michael, 19 Avenue Phillipe le Boucher, Neuilly, Paris

The match may never have happened. Arthur Linton died in June that year, six weeks after winning Bordeaux–Paris.

Michael was a draw wherever he went. A crowd of 22,000 turned out to watch him race in Paris. His biggest engagement in Britain was the so-called chain match at Catford track in 1896. William Spears Simpson had invented the Simpson lever chain, which he was so insistent was an improvement over conventional chains that he staked part of his fortune on it.

Pryor Dodge wrote:

In the fall of 1895, Simpson offered ten-to-one odds that riders with his chain would beat bicyclists with regular chains. Later known as the chain matches, these races at the Catford track in London attracted huge crowds estimated between twelve and twenty thousand in June 1896. Simpson's team not only included the top racers – Tom Linton, Jimmy Michael, and Constant Huret – but also the Gladiator pacing team brought over from Paris. Pacers enabled a racer to ride faster by shielding him from air resistance. Although Simpson won the chain matches, they only proved that the Gladiator pacers were superior to their English rivals.

Michael was pitched against Charley Barden in the five-mile race. What happened next – indeed whether it happened in London or at another chain match in Germany – is now lost. But stories start with Michael taking a drink offered to him by Warburton and end with his riding poorly to his falling off his bike, remounting and setting off in the wrong direction. The one thing accounts agree on is that the crowd shouted "Dope!"

Michael's strange behaviour at this meeting, and his withdrawal, led him to accuse Warburton of doping him. Many rumours surrounded Warburton but none had been proven and he sued for libel. It's unclear whether the case was heard. Warburton died two years later and the report of his death in the New York Times concluded:

Michael is said to have accused Warbuton of poisoning him, and a suit for libel was instituted by the trainer, who later consented to an amicable settlement, although during the past season frequent rumors have come from London that Michael was to be returned to England to appear in the case.

In the background of whatever happened is a report that Warburton bet not on Michael at one or more chain matches but against him. The French historian Pierre Chany says Warburton drugged Michael to make him lose. Michael had drawn the attention of an American agent called Bliss who had offered him exhibition races in the USA. The speculation is therefore that Warburton drugged his rider to discourage Bliss's plans and to keep Michael for himself. But it is only speculation.

Michael did go to America. He missed the world championship in 1896 because that's where he was riding. Michael's earnings rose steadily, winning the "fabulous fortune" of 200,000 francs a year, according to Chany. Another historian said:

Michael... signed a contract at the beginning of the 1898 season guaranteeing him $2,500 for each of nine paced races against his main rivals, including Major Taylor, making a total guaranteed income of $22,500, an enormous sum of money. Cycle Age described it as 'the greatest deal in the history of professional cycle racing and in fact of all sport outside pugilism.' For the few bicycle racing stars at the very top of the sport, the sky was the limit as far as what they could earn. Manufacturers were prepared to spend large amounts of money to hire star riders to advertise their bicycles and tires, and spectators lined up at the box office. Michael told a reporter he intended to make $30,000 from bicycle racing in July, August and September 1898.

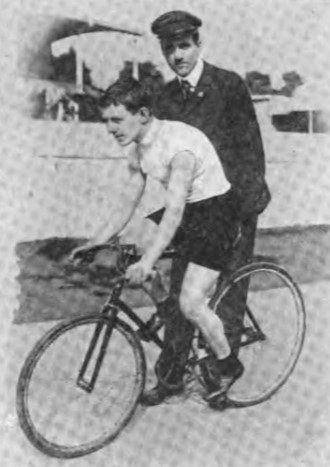
Jimmy Michael, 1901, and Floyd MacFarland

Michael lost almost all of it by 1899 in gambling and by becoming a horse-race owner and jockey, having been persuaded by the French champion, Fernand Charron, with whom he was friendly. He crashed at 60 mph in a race in Berlin in 1903 and cracked his skull. He began drinking in the company of the Franco-Swiss rider, Jean Gougolz, whom Victor Breyer, deputy organiser of the Tour de France, described as "a weak-minded lovable fellow when sober but bad under the influence of drink." From then on, Breyer said, "Jimmy kept sliding down the toboggan, as the saying goes."

Breyer last saw Michael when he engaged him to ride at the Buffalo track in Paris in 1903. Michael was missing when his time came to ride.

After a wait, during which the public was growing impatient, Gougolz (who happened to be sober and was going to act as Michael's pacemaker) volunteered to take Breyer to where Michael might be found. They drove to a public house close by the Arc de Triomphe Michael was in an armchair near the bar, visibly drunk. Gougolz persuaded him to fulfil his commitment and the race was started an hour late with Michael among the riders. But he lost lap after lap, finishing a bad last, and he left the track followed by boos and hisses from the spectators.

Walter Rutt, the world sprint champion in 1913, said Michael began drinking because of an "everlasting headache" which followed his fall at Berlin.." In November 1904 Michael negotiated a final round of races in America which he hoped would restore his physical and financial health. He died of delirium tremens in his cabin on the liner Savoie as it took him there. The cause was given as "fatigue fever".

== Private life ==
Michael married Marie Emma Anna Müller, sister of Italian/French cyclist Rodolfo Muller. After Michael's death his wife remarried to Swedish-American cyclist/pacer Gussie Lawson, who died in a racing accident in 1913.

== Miscellaneous honours ==
Michael was drawn by Henri de Toulouse-Lautrec, the French Art Nouveau artist, for a poster to advertise the Simpson Chain Company. Toulouse-Lautrec was a cycling fan and often went to Paris velodromes. He travelled to London in 1896 to make first sketches of the Welshman before completing them in Paris. Simpson rejected Lautrec's drawing because of technical details. Nevertheless 200 copies of the poster were printed. The National Museum of Wales bought one in the 1960s although it is not on display.

Michael was inducted into the Welsh Sports Hall of Fame in 1998.

== Palmarès ==
1895
1st World Stayers Championships – Professional
1902
3rd European Stayers Championships – Professional

== See also ==
- List of doping cases in cycling
