= 1898 Paris–Roubaix =

Cycling race

Race details
- Dates: 10 April 1898
- Stages: 1
- Distance: 268 km (167 mi)
- Winning time: 8h 13' 15"

Results
	Winner	Maurice Garin (ITA)
	Second	Auguste Stéphane (FRA)
	Third	Édouard Wattelier (FRA)

The 1898 Paris–Roubaix was the third edition of the Paris–Roubaix, a classic one-day cycle race in France. The single day event was held on 10 April 1898 and stretched 268 km (167 mi) from Paris to its end in a velodrome in Roubaix. The winner was Maurice Garin, an Italian living in France.

== Results ==
Final results (1-10)
Rank	Cyclist	Time
1	Maurice Garin (ITA)	8h 13' 15″
2	Auguste Stéphane (FRA)	+28' 00″
3	Édouard Wattelier (FRA)	+33' 52″
4	Jean Bertin (FRA)	+46' 26″
5	Charles Meyer (DEN)	+1h 12' 59″
6	Rodolfo Muller (ITA)	+1h 31' 31″
7	Gaston Herrinck (BEL)	+2h 00' 35″
8	Jules Cordier (BEL)	+2h 08' 16″
9	Liegeois (FRA)	+2h 33' 01″
10	François Monachon (FRA)	+2h 39' 05″
