= Emile Van Berendonck =

Belgian cyclist (born 1864)

Personal information
- Full name: Philippe-Emile Van Berendonck
- Nickname: Eole
- Born: 27 January 1864 Brussels, Belgium

Cycling career
- Sport: Cycling
- Discipline: Road
- Role: Rider

Major wins
- Belgian National Road Race Championships (1882)

Philippe-Emile Van Berendonck also written as Emile Van Beerendonck (born 27 January 1864) was a Belgian road cyclist and industrialist who later started living in France and competed under the name Eole. He was a pioneer in the earliest era of road cycling. He was the winner of the inaugural Belgian National Road Race Championships in 1882. He also won other prizes and had a top-10 finish at the inaugural Paris–Roubaix in 1896.

He was an industrialist and was involved in developing and inventing mechanical devices related to manufacturing and material handling.

== Biography ==
=== Personal life ===
Van Berendonck was born in 1864 in Brussels, Belgium. His parents were Egide Van Berendonck (born 1821) who worked as a bookbinder and Amélie Kamfort (born 1828) who worked as a maid. He continued to live in Brussesl, and married there to Anne Catherine Vanpraet (born 1869) on 24 February 1892.

=== Cycling career ===
One of his earliest achievements was finishing second in the Grand councours de vélocipedes in 1881 behind MM Noiset. It was a race over 3000 metres at boulevard du Midi.

On 25 June 1882 he won the first Belgian National Road Race Championships. He made his own velocipedes but went bankrupt in the same month as the championships. He rode the championships at a "Howe" vélocipède supplied by Firmin Mignot. He completed the 3,500-metre distance in 6 minutes 40 seconds, ahead of 30 competitors. He also won the same day another road race, winning 50 Belgian francs and a diploma.

In July 1882 Van Berendonck competed at the cycling competitions held in Spa that attracted foreign spectators. He won two of the competitions and finished second in a third one. He won the c. 10,000 race around the fountains and won the 3000 metre race going back and forth over Avenue du Marteau. He finished second in the obstacle course (sidewalk, vault and balancing) behind MM Noiset.

He moved to France and started competing there under the name Eole, and also acquired there a certain amount of fame. In 1896 he participated in the inaugural edition of Paris–Roubaix, finishing in seventh place.

=== Professional career ===
Berendonck was an industrialist. He made velocipedes in his business on 34 rue de la Régence in Brussels, but it went bankrupt on 29 June 1882. In 1895, Le Moniteur de la Teinture described one of his inventions, a machine à encoller (sizing machine), designed to simplify textile coating processes while improving regularity and reducing solvent consumption. The design featured a dual-cylinder system operating in opposite directions with a continuous cloth belt and adjustable guides to ensure even application.

Van Berendonck later filed a United States patent for a Loading and Unloading Device (U.S. Patent No. 827,831), granted on 7 August 1906. The invention related to pneumatic systems for transferring subdivided materials such as coal or grain, particularly in maritime loading and unloading operations. It aimed to improve simplicity, efficiency, and cost-effectiveness in material handling through the use of air pressure and flexible membranes controlling flow within a tubular receptacle.

== Major results ==
1881
2nd Grand councours de vélocipedes
1882
(gold) Belgian National Road Race Championships
1st Mons (25 June)
Spa courses de Vélocipèdes (16 July)

1st 10,000 metres
1st 3000 metres
2nd obstacle course

1896
7th Paris–Roubaix
