= Choppy Warburton =

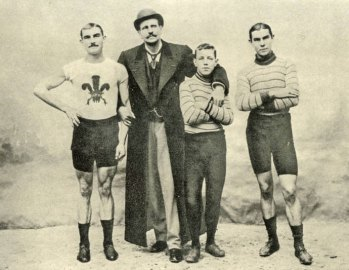
Choppy Warburton (suited) along with cyclists Arthur Linton, Jimmy Michael and Tom Linton

James Edward 'Choppy' Warburton (13 November 1845 – 18 December 1897) was an English record-breaking runner and a cycling coach. His career in cycling has frequent claims that he drugged riders to make them ride faster.

== Origins ==
Warburton was born in Coal Hey, just off Lower Deardengate, in Haslingden, Lancashire, son of James Warburton and Harriet Birtwistle (a widow, her maiden name was Morris), the eldest of 12 children of which six survived. Although the property in which he was born still stands, its blue plaque does not commemorate Warburton.

He was once licensee of the Fisher's Arms in Birley Street, Blackburn.

== Running career ==
Warburton's potential as a runner was identified at 17 by John Duckworth, his employer at Hutch Bank cotton mill. Warburton competed as an amateur athlete between 1866 and 1879 before turning professional at 34. He won more than 500 first prizes, including 75 cups, visiting venues throughout the north of England, running races from one mile to more than 20, all while working full-time as a warehouseman. Warburton visited his brother George in the United States in 1880, entering several competitions and acquiring 80 cups and medals.

Chris Aspin, of Haslingden history society, said:

Choppy came from Haslingden (where I live) and became a member of the local athletic club, founded in 1868. He claimed to be a world-champion long distance runner. He won more than 700 trophies, 511 before he turned professional in 1880. As a boy he ran alongside steam trains on the local line, and was spotted by a wealthy local sports lover, who made a match for him.

== Cycle racing ==
Warburton coached three cycling champions: Jimmy Michael and brothers Thomas Linton and Arthur Linton of Aberaman, in the Cynon Valley. Warburton's success has been questioned, with claims that he drugged his charges. Michael is said to have accused Warburton of poisoning him, before he was taken to court for libel.

The writer Rudiger Rabenstein claims that Arthur Linton was "massively doped" for the 1896 Bordeaux–Paris. There is in no proof that Linton was doped but his obituary "by one who knew him" said:

I saw him at Tours, halfway through the race, at midnight, where he came in with glassy eyes and tottering limbs, and in a high state of nervous excitement. I then heard him swear – a very rare occurrence with him – but after a rest he was off again, though none of us expected he would go very far. At Orléans at five o'clock in the morning, Choppy and I looked after a wreck – a corpse as Choppy called him – yet he had sufficient energy, heart, pluck, call it what you will, to enable him to gain 18 minutes on the last 45 miles of hilly road.

Another obituary added:

I hear by a side wind that one eminent promoter of professionalism... could, like Hamlet's Father's Ghost, a tale unfold which would cause each individual hair upon the licensing committee of the National Cyclists' Union to stand on end...

Arthur Linton was described by the Anti-Doping Forum in Sydney in 2004, as the first reported death of an athlete from drugs in sport, citing strychnine although other sources indicate he died of typhoid.

According to the Lancashire Family History Society:

"Choppy has been firmly identified as the instigator of drug-taking in the sport [cycling] in the 19th century."

The writer Simon Craig said:

Arthur Linton was not the only Warburton protege to die young, for Jimmy Michael was only 28 at the time of his rather mysterious death in November 1904. And there was also Arthur Linton's brother Tom, who died at the age of 39 in 1914, the cause of death being given, coincidentally, as typhoid fever. Some have sought to implicate Warburton in their deaths, too, but no direct link seems possible since the trainer himself died of a heart attack in 1897. Even so, it seems highly likely that Warburton did dope his cyclists, and possible that Arthur Linton's death was hastened by damage done to him by drugs administered by Warburton. Yet the symptoms described in the newspapers are consistent with typhoid fever, and we are not entitled to state categorically that drugs played a part. Even with modern drug-testing procedures it is hard to prove guilt or innocence; for an incident more than a century ago, it is impossible.

Warburton was banned from the sport.

Warburton appeared in a drawing of Michael by Henri de Toulouse-Lautrec, the French Art Nouveau artist, for a poster to advertise Michael's sponsor, the Simpson chain company. The National Museum of Wales bought one of the posters in the 1960s although it is not on display.

== Nickname ==
Warburton is said to have gained the nickname Choppy from his father, a sailor who always responded with 'choppy', when asked what the weather had been on a voyage, although according to the United Kingdom census in 1871, his father was a power-loom weaver in a cotton mill.

== Death ==
Warburton died of a heart attack in Wood Green, London in 1897.

== See also ==
- List of doping cases in cycling
