= Gladiator Cycle Company =

French vehicle manufacturer, 1891-1920

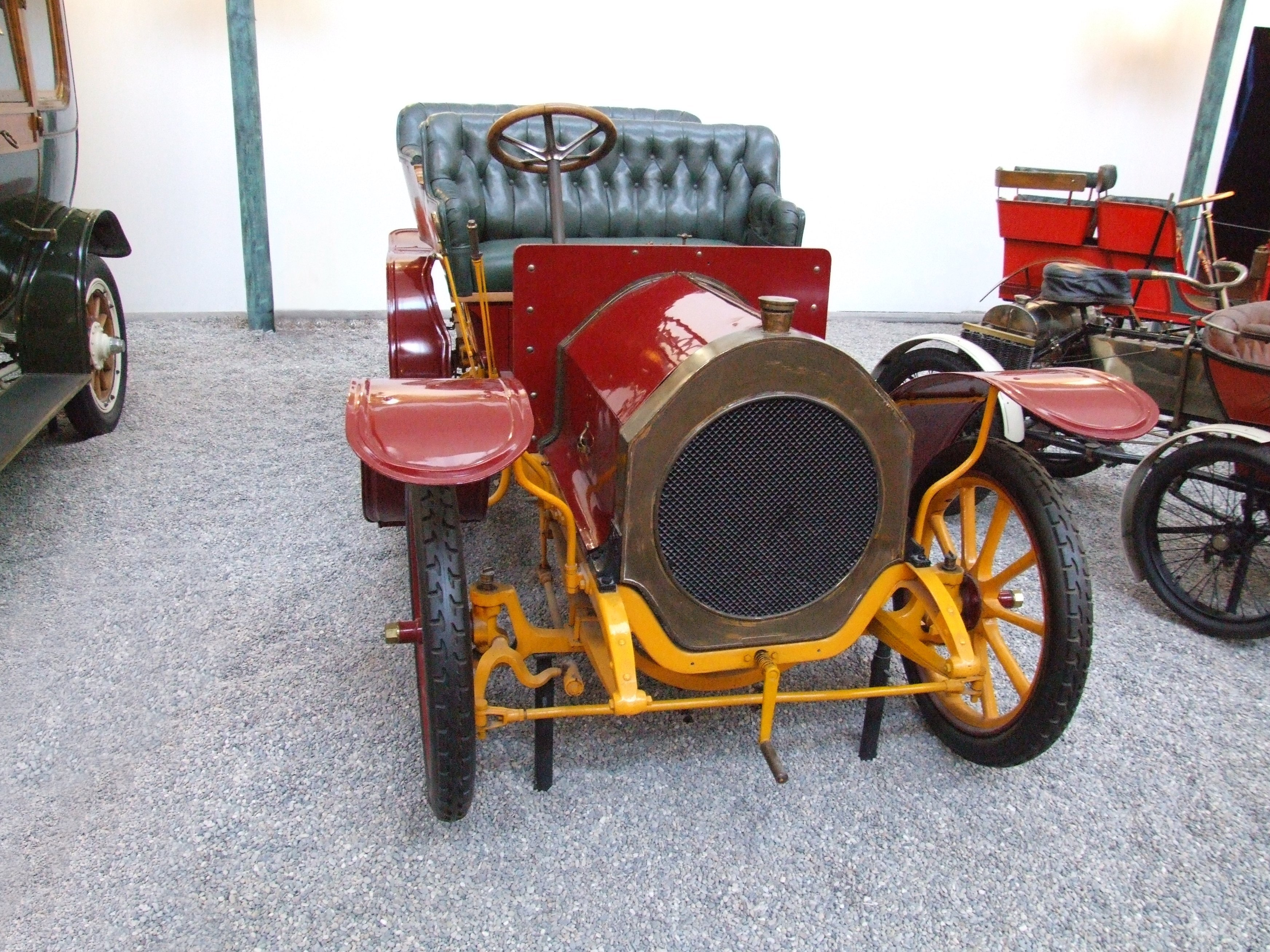
Gladiator Double Phaeton of 1907, 2 cylinder, 2,423 cc, 12 PS, 45 km/h, at Cité de l'Automobile – Musée National – Collection Schlumpf, Mulhouse, France

The Gladiator Cycle Company, Clément-Gladiator (from 1896), was a French manufacturer of bicycles, motorcycles and cars based in Le Pré-Saint-Gervais, Seine.

Throughout its productive life from 1891 until its demise in 1920 the company was variously owned by: the founders Alexandre Darracq and Paul Aucoq; from 1896 by a London public listed company Clément, Gladiator & Humber renamed in 1901 Société Française des Cycles Clément & Gladiator and from 1906 by 'Vinot et Deguingand'.

== Cycle manufacture ==
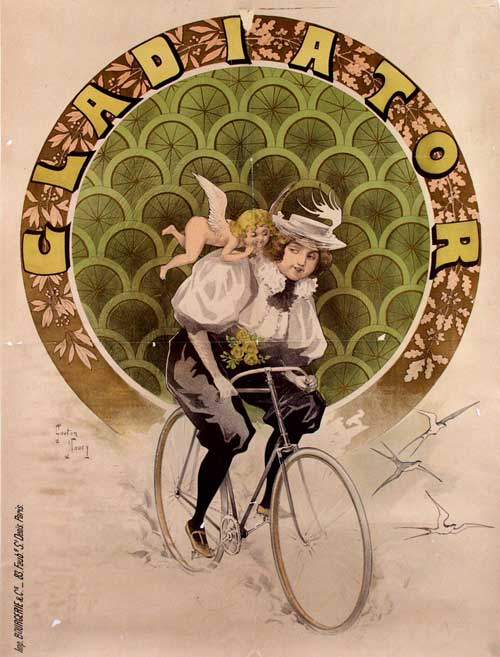
Poster by Gaston Noury

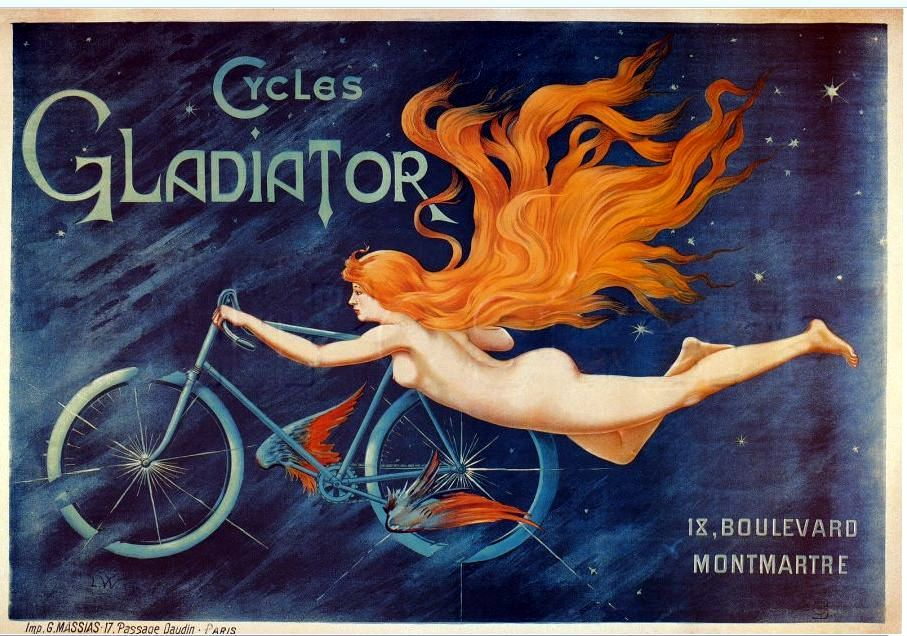
Poster printed by Georges Massias

=== Gladiator cycles ===
The cycle manufacturer was founded at Le Pré-Saint-Gervais, Seine north east of Paris by Alexandre Darracq and Paul Aucoq in 1891.

In 1891, the English cycle maker, Thomas Pullinger, was asked to visit Gladiator on behalf of Humber cycles to discuss a potential partnership. This did not materialise.

=== Clément-Gladiator cycles ===
In 1896 Adolphe Clément who held the extremely profitable manufacturing rights for Dunlop tyres in France joined with a syndicate led by Dunlop's founder Harvey Du Cros to buy out the Gladiator Cycle Company and they merged it into a major bicycle manufacturing conglomerate of Clément, Gladiator & Humber & Co Limited. The range of cycles was expanded with tricycles, quadricycles, and in 1902 a motorised bicycle, then cars and motorcycles.

== Motorised cycle manufacture ==
=== Clément and Gladiator ===
From 1895 Clément cycles also started to focus on motorized vehicles. In 1902 they offered a motorized bicycle with a 142 cc engine that had an automatic inlet valve, an overhead exhaust valve and an external flywheel. The combined oil and petrol tank was behind the saddle and the batteries were stored in a leather case strapped to the horizontal frame tube. This 'motorisation adaptation' was sold on both Clément and Gladiator cycles. In Britain these popular motorised cycles were known as Clément-Garrards.

== Motor manufacturing ==
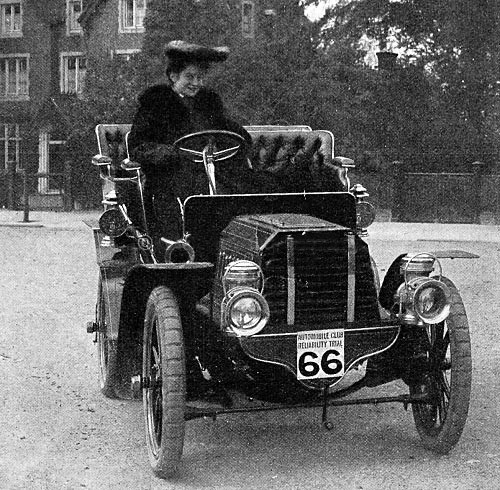
Dorothy Levitt and the 12 hp Gladiator car she drove in a series of reliability trials in 1903

=== Clément-Gladiator motorcars ===
After the 1896 takeover the range was expanded and in 1902 a motorised bicycle lead to cars and motorcycles.(See Clément Gladiator cycles above for further details)

From 1901 Clément-Gladiator cars were built at the Levallois-Perret factory and by 1902 production was over 1,000 cars per annum, 800+ of which were sold in England. Some of these cars were equipped with engines manufactured nearby in Saint-Denis Paris by Aster in single, twin or four cylinder configurations.

The company was divided in 1903, Charles Chetwynd-Talbot running Clément-Talbot Ltd with Adolphe Clément as a significant shareholder. Clément renamed the French branch Clément-Gladiator and also formed Clément-Bayard.

After 1903 the Clément-Gladiator name continued to be used on the shaft-drive cars made at the Pre-Saint-Gervais factory, whilst chain-driven vehicles were marketed as Gladiators. The Clément name was dropped in 1907 and in 1909 another French manufacturer, Vinot et Deguingand, took over Gladiator and transferred production to Puteaux. At this time the Pre-Saint-Gervais factory reverted to making bicycles.

In 1909 Gladiator was bought by Vinot et Deguingand, who transferred production to their factory at Puteaux. The Pré St Gervais works continued to make bicycles. The production of the 1908 12hp model P or PS, was transferred in 1909 to the Vinot Deguingand factory in Puteaux. From then the P model was also available as a Vinot Deguingand and stayed in production until 1910. It was the last Gladiator designed car as Vinot Deguingand took over.

The Gladiator name was dropped from the cars in 1920.

== Wartime production ==
During the First World War the Le Pré-Saint-Gervais Gladiator factory produced arms from 1915, and was the principal producer of the Chauchat machine rifle. The general manager, Paul Ribeyrolles, was involved in the design of the Chauchat and other French small-arms during the war.

== Gallery ==
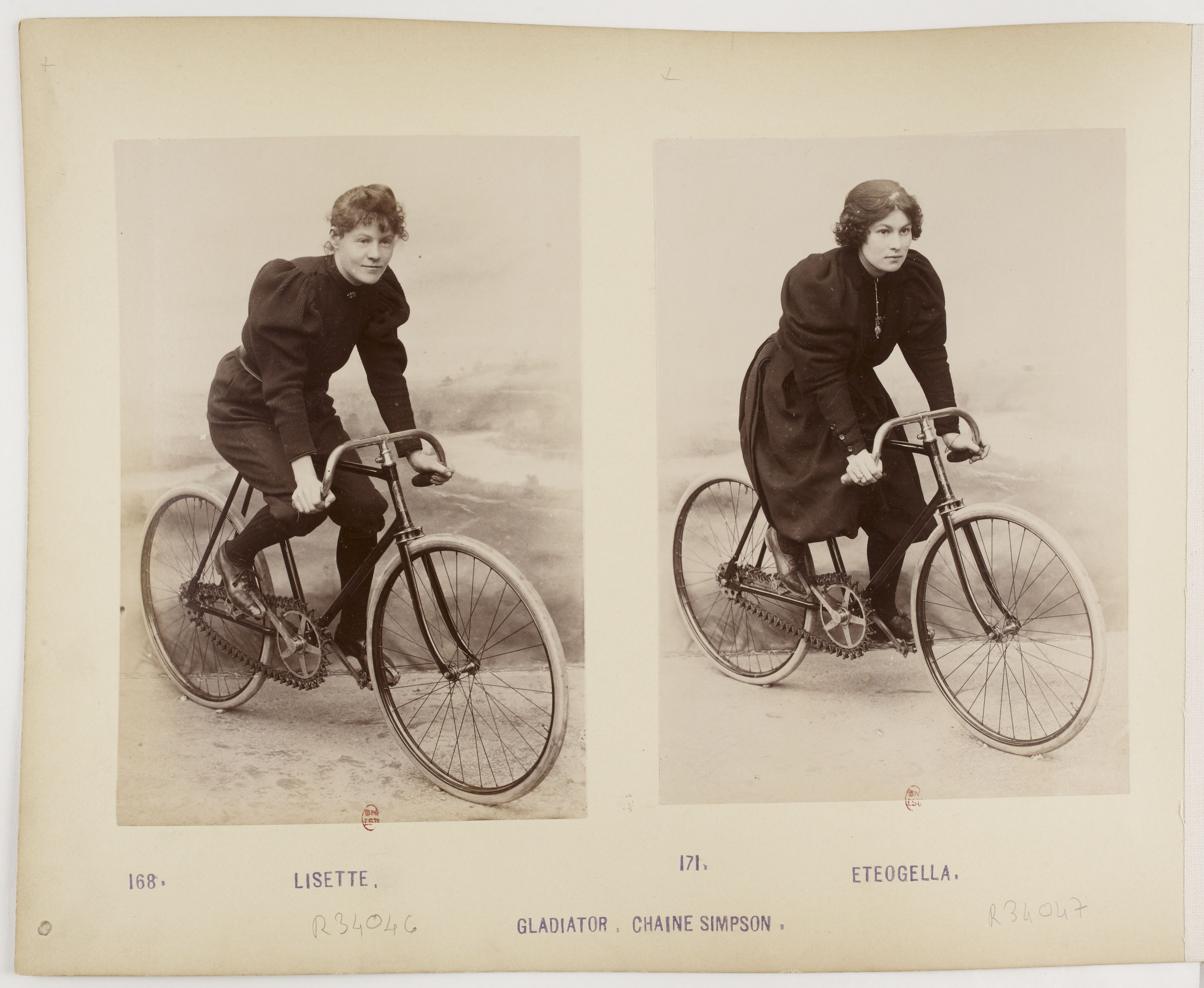
Lisette and Eteogella on Gladiator bicycles with Simpson lever chains in 1896

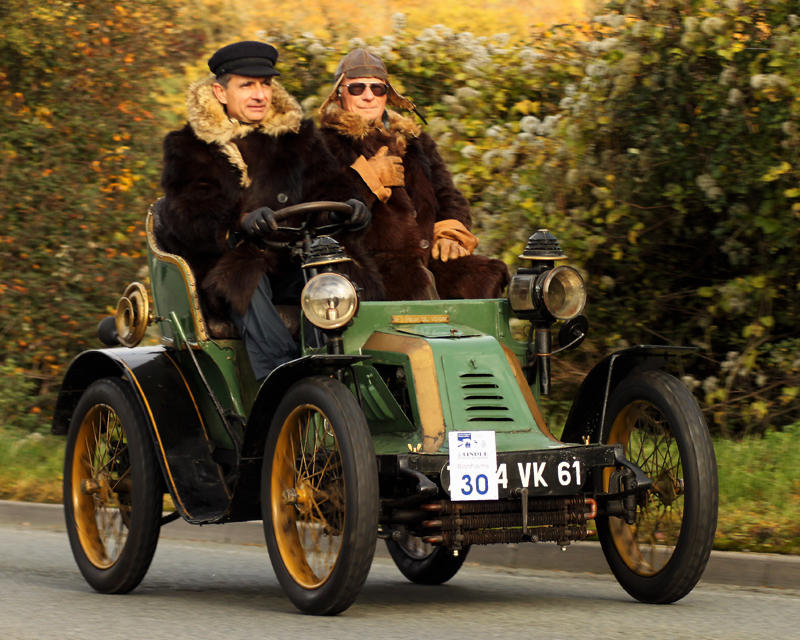
Gladiator 3 1/2HP Phaeton from 1899

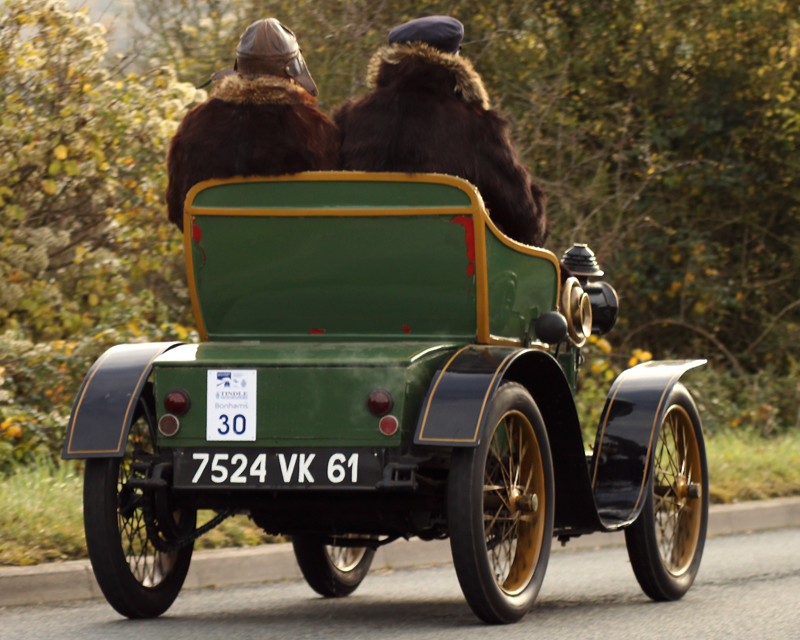
Gladiator 3 1/2HP Phaeton from 1899

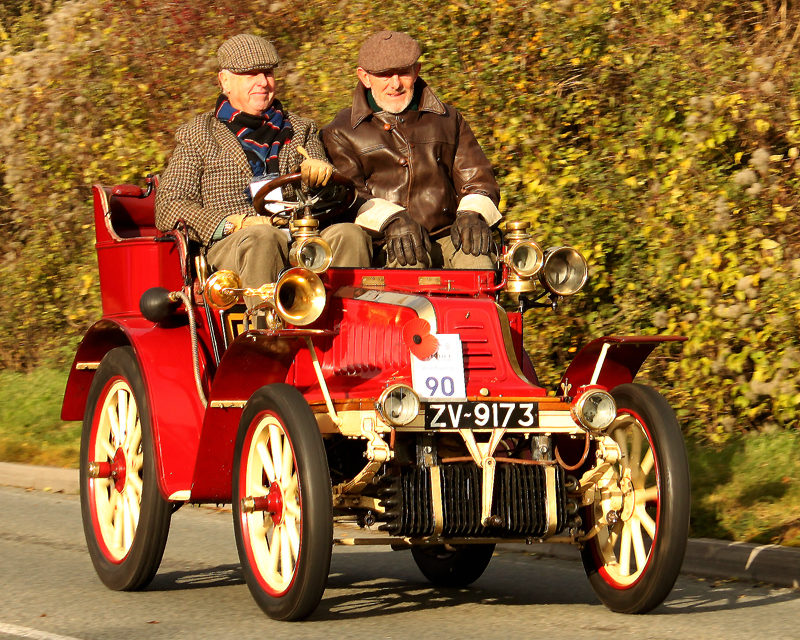
Gladiator 6 1/2HP Tonneau from 1900

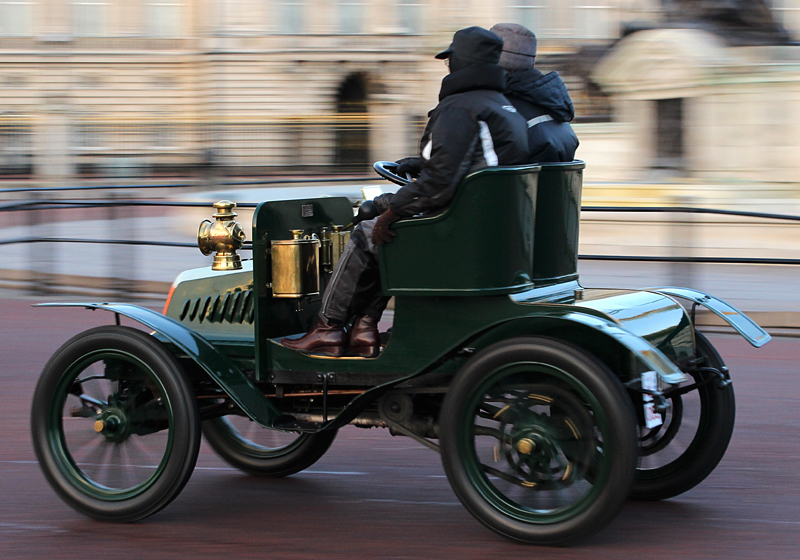
Gladiator 6 1/2HP Two-seater from 1901

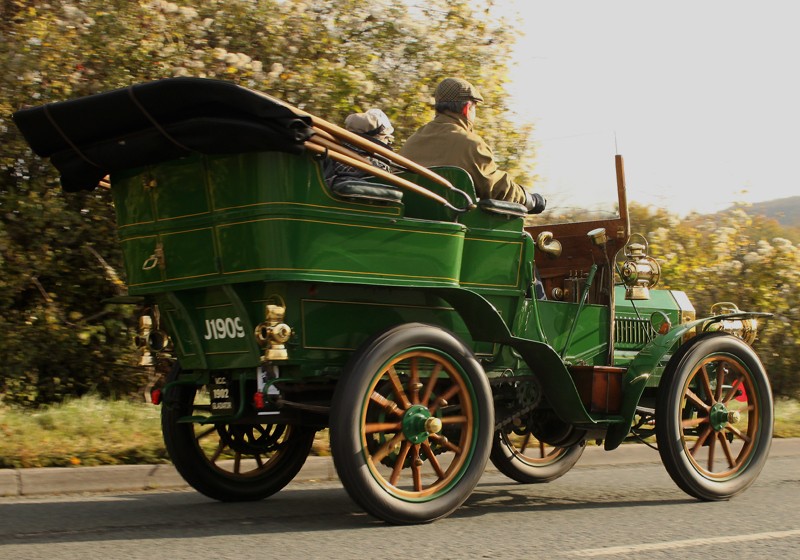
Gladiator 10HP Tonneau from 1902

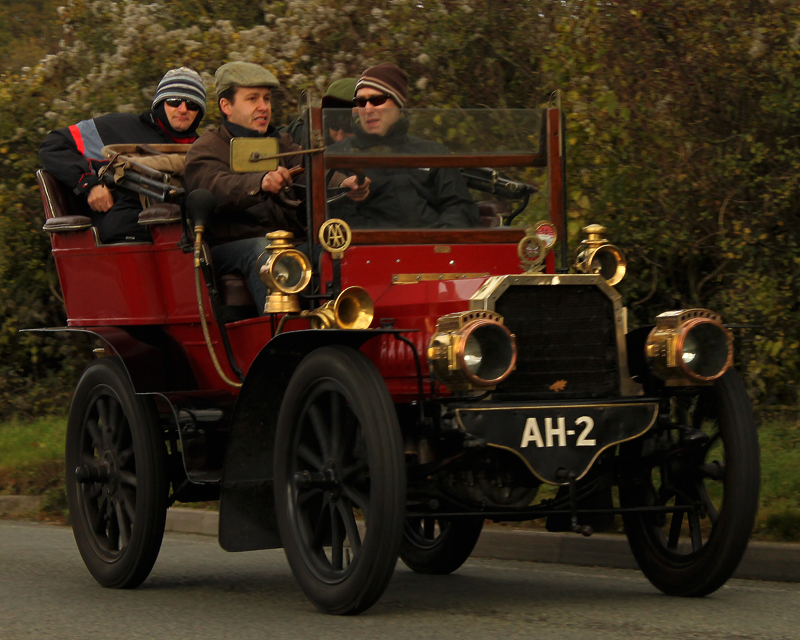
Gladiator 10HP Tonneau from 1903

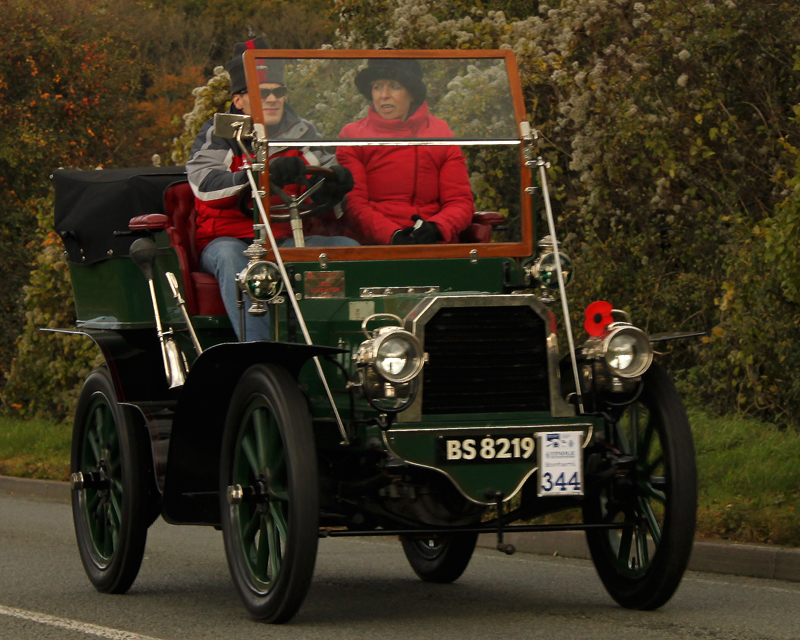
Gladiator 10HP Rear-entrance tonneau from 1903

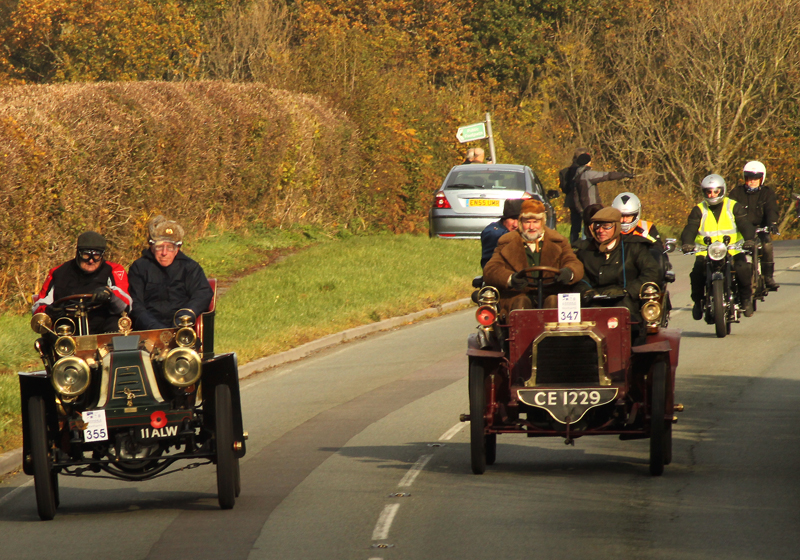
Gladiator 10HP Tonneau (347) from 1903 and Renault 10/12 HP Tonneau (355) from 1903

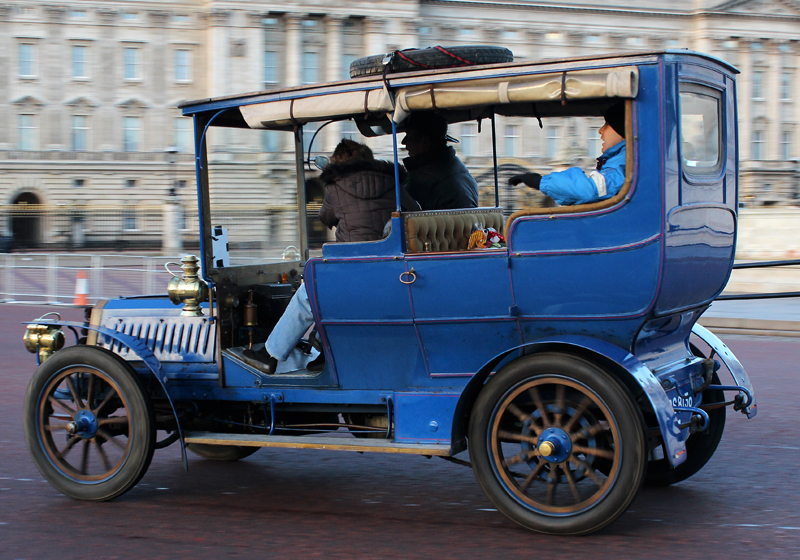
Gladiator 14 HP Demi-limousine from 1904

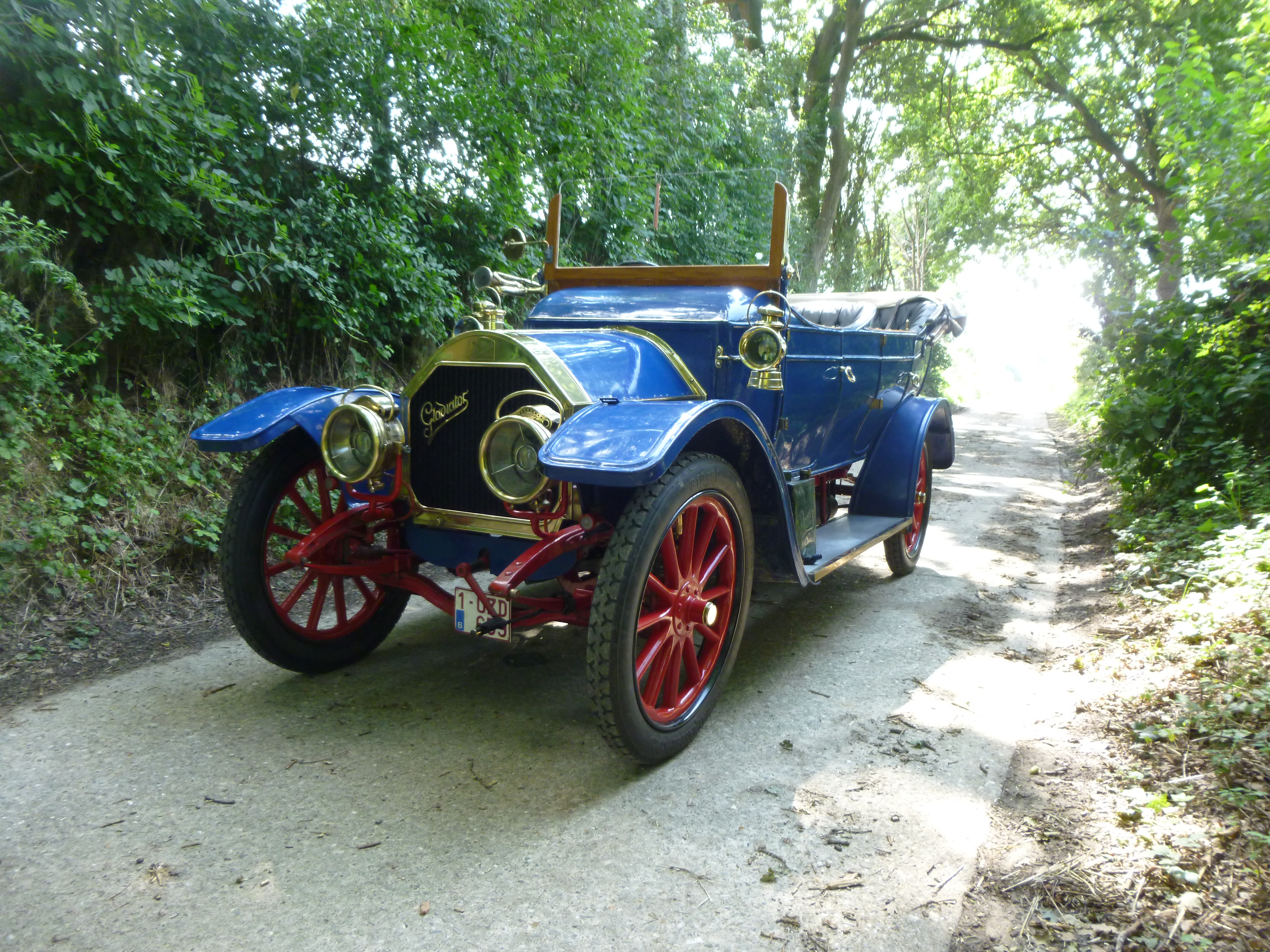
Gladiator type P 1910

== See also ==
- For other cycle, motor-cycle, motor-car, aeroplane and airship companies associated with French industrialist Adolphe Clément-Bayard, see Clement (disambiguation)
