= Auguste Stéphane =

French cyclist

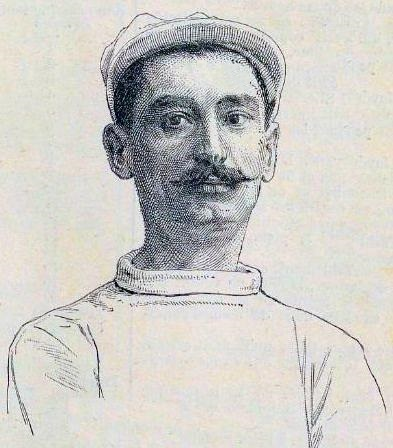

Personal information
- Born: 9 February 1863 Metz, France
- Died: 12 February 1947 (aged 84) Publier, France

Cycling career
- Sport: Cycling
- Role: Rider

Professional teams
- 1891: Individual
- 1892: Dunlop
- 1893: Individual
- 1894: Hercules
- 1895-1898: Individual

Major wins
- Bordeaux-Paris 1892

Jean Auguste Étienne called Auguste Stéphane (9 February 1863 – 12 February 1947) was a French racing cyclist. He won the 1892 Bordeaux-Paris and finished second in the 1898 Paris–Roubaix.

Auguste Stéphane was active as a cyclist between 1891 and 1901. In 1892, he won the second edition of Bordeaux-Paris, a race over more than 600 kilometers. The following year he finished this race in second place behind Louis Cottereau and won Basel-Strasbourg. In 1894, he won Paris-Spa and in 1897, together with Jean Bertin, Toulouse-Agen-Toulouse. At the third edition of Paris-Roubaix in 1898, he was runner-up behind Maurice Garin.

On 6 and 7 January 1894, he races against Jean-Marie Corre in a 1000 kilometer match at the Vélodrome d'Hiver in Paris. He covers the distance in 39 hours, 28 minutes and 8 seconds and wins the match. The race is not "particularly interesting", according to the Dutch magazine "De Kampioen", because "from the beginning, you quickly understand that Stéphane is the strongest of the two riders".
