= Constant Huret =

French cyclist

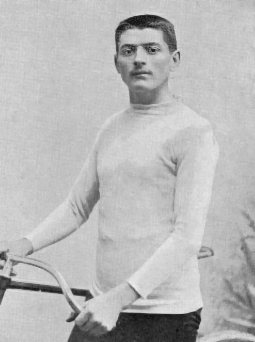

Constant Huret, nicknamed le Boulanger (the Baker, French: [kɔ̃stɑ̃ yʁɛ]; 26 January 1870, in Ressons-le-Long – 18 September 1951, in Paris), was a French long distance track racing cyclist. He was a professional from 1894 to 1902.

== Major achievements ==
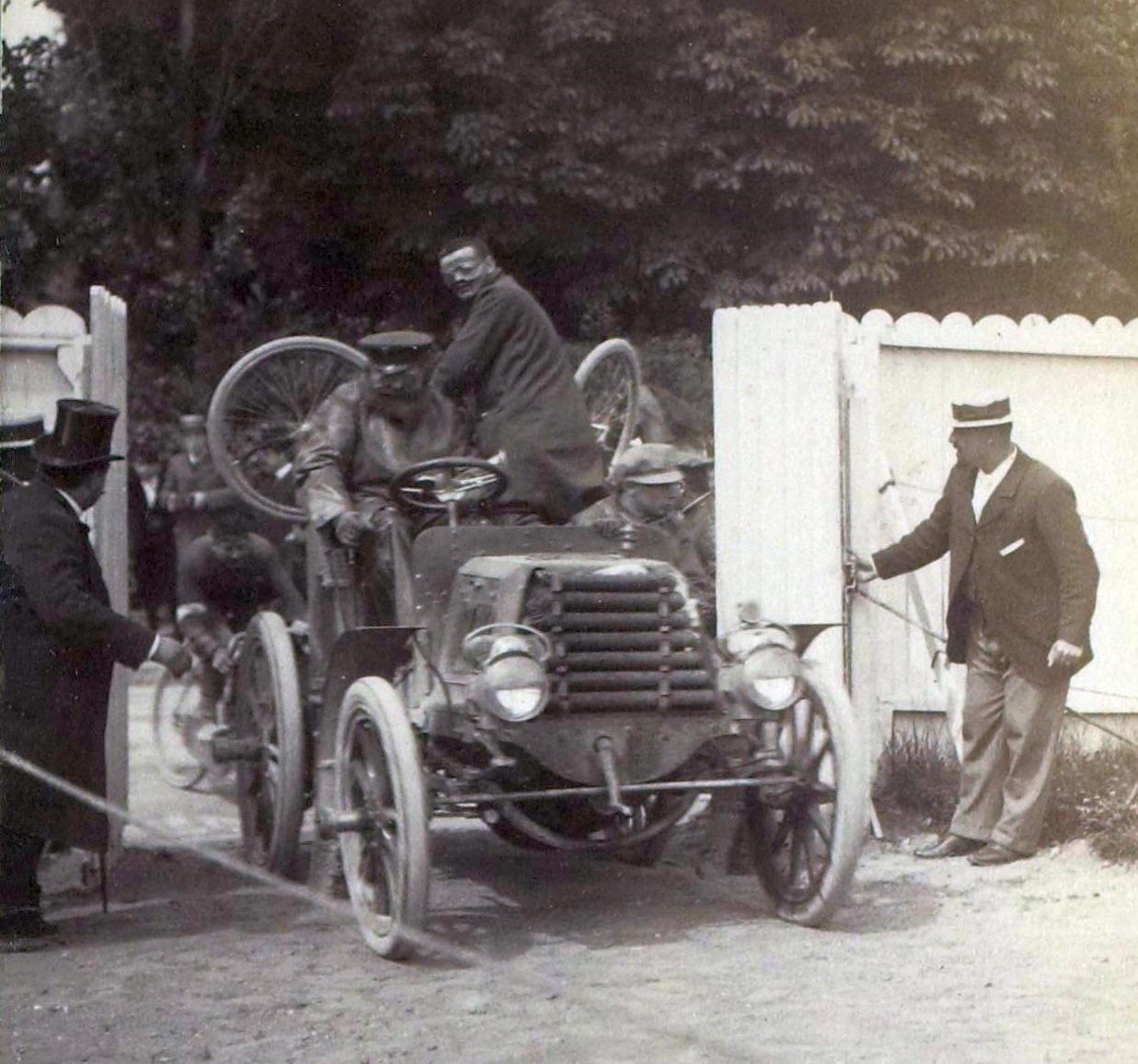
Huret is standing on his guide car (Panhard-Levassor driven by René de Knyff) at the goal of Paris-Bordeaux Critérium des Entraîneurs (1899) (Note: His record-breaking result, achieved with Knyff driving ahead of his bicycle as the guide car when nobody knew much about aerodynamic drag, stood for 34 years. A car or motorcycle shielding the competitor by running immediately ahead was prohibited later by race organisers.)

He won the 600 km Bordeaux–Paris road race (known as The Derby of the Road, official name: Paris-Bordeaux Critérium des Entraîneurs) in 1899 and held the record winning time for 34 years. He was also the 1900 world velodrome champion and won the Bol d'Or four times, in 1894, 1895, 1898 and 1902.

== In art ==
He is depicted in La Chaine Simpson by Henri de Toulouse-Lautrec racing for the Simpson chain team.

== Palmarès ==
1894
1st French National Stayers Championships
1st Bol d'Or
World records for 24 hours (736km) and 100km
8 Days of Paris – Vel d'Hiv
1895
1st Bol d'Or
World records for 6 hours and 24 hours (829.498km)
1896
World records for 6 hours and 100km
1897
World records for 6 hours, 100km and 24 hours (909.027km)
1898
1st Bol d'Or
1899
1st Bordeaux–Paris (594km in 16 hours and 35 minutes at an average 36kmh)
1900
1st World Championship, Track, Stayers, Elite, Paris
1902
1st Bol d'Or
World record for 6 hours
